= The Sterilization of Leilani Muir =

- Release poster
- Directed by: Glynis Whiting
- Written by: Amanda McConnell
- Produced by: Graydon McRae, Jerry Krepakevich
- Starring: Leilani Muir; Thomas Peacocke; Judy Mahby; Gord Marriott; Stephen Jay Gould; Peter Lougheed
- Cinematography: Kenneth Hewlett
- Edited by: Wayne Anderson
- Music by: Jan Randall
- Distributed by: National Film Board of Canada
- Release date: 1996
- Running time: 47 minutes
- Country: Canada
- Language: English

The Sterilization of Leilani Muir is a 1996 documentary directed by Glynis Whiting about the life and times of Leilani Muir, the first person to file a lawsuit against the Alberta provincial government for wrongful sterilization under the Sexual Sterilization Act of Alberta.

== Synopsis ==
The film runs through the life of Leilani Muir, starting with her early life as a child, her life at the Provincial Training School (Michener Centre) in Red Deer, Alberta, her experience of the sterilization itself, and her lawsuit that ensued years later. Along the way in the film, professors, legal scholars, and other people of interest are interviewed and offer their knowledge of specific eugenic topics. Also, brief explanations of the theory of eugenics, IQ tests and their relation to eugenics, and a history of eugenics in Alberta and Germany are provided.

Leilani Muir was born July 15, 1944, in Calgary, Alberta and grew up on a farm. She experienced a rough childhood as her mother often beat her and didn't provide her with regular meals. As a result, Leilani often went hungry and began to steal classmates' lunches at school. The teachers were quick to notice this and would often bring lunches for her. Teachers also began to question Leilani's parents but in order to avoid answering these questions, her family would move away. Many neighbours did not even know Leilani existed as she was often locked away on the farm, hidden for no one to see.

Just before Leilani's 11th birthday, July 12, 1955, Leilani was taken to the Provincial Training School for Mental Defectives (also called the Michener Center) located in Red Deer, Alberta. Leilani, not knowing at the time why she was placed in the centre, believed that she had been taken to an orphanage since her mother had told her that she had never wanted a girl. During the next couple of years, Leilani played with the other girls, received a clean bed and clean clothes, was fed three meals a day, went to school and "kicked butt if she felt like it."

During her time at the Michener Center, Leilani was given a single IQ test in which she scored a 64. She was termed a moron and brought up before the Alberta Eugenics Board. They had asked her questions such as "At what age does a baby begin to walk and talk?" for roughly five minutes. Leilani had known the answer to this question as she had had a younger brother growing up. However, she still was deemed a danger of transmitting mental defects to progeny and incapable of intelligent parenthood. In 1957, at the age of 14 years, Leilani was told that she was undergoing surgery to have her appendix removed. The surgeons and staff did not mention that she was being sterilized by having her fallopian tubes removed.

In 1965, at the age of 21, Leilani left the Michener Centre and began to support herself. She got married at the age of 24 and wanted to have a family. After going to the doctor, it was revealed that Leilani had been sterilized and could no longer have children. She married again, not having told her husband of her past, and when an adoption fell through, quickly became depressed.

On June 12, 1995, with the Honorable Madame Joanne B. Viet presiding, Leilani, sued the Alberta Government for wrongful sterilization and damages, with her lawyers Jon Faulds and Sandra Anderson. On January 25, 1996, Viet ruled in favour of Muir and awarded her $750,000 CAD in damages. Leilani wishes her story to be made known so that what happened to her and many others may never happen in Canada again.

== People and interviewees ==
- Leilani Muir: herself
- Professor Stephen Jay Gould (Harvard University): interviewee
- Professor Dick Sobsey (University of Alberta): interviewee
- James Wallace, Jr. (Smithsonian Institution): interviewee
- Professor Alexander J. Tymchuk (University of California, Los Angeles): interviewee
- Professor Timothy J. Christian (Dean, University of Alberta Law Centre): interviewee
- David Thomas King (fmr. member of Legislative Assembly in Alberta): interviewee
- Margaret Thompson, Ph.D (fmr. member of the Alberta Eugenics Board): interviewee
- Jon Faulds: Leilani's lawyer
- Sandra Anderson: Leilani's lawyer

== Production ==
The Sterilization of Leilani Muir was produced by Graydon McCrea under the National Film Board of Canada in Edmonton, Alberta, in 1996.

== Reception ==
- The Sociology Video Project (York University, Toronto) rates this film at 3.1 / 4.

== Awards ==
- Certificate of Excellence, HESCA Film Festival, Lake Tahoe, Nevada, USA, May 22, 1997.
- Certificate of Merit, Western Psychological Association (WPA) Film Festival, Seattle, Washington, USA, April 24–27, 1997.
- Nominated for a Banff Rockie Award, 1996.
