= Leonard Jan Le Vann =

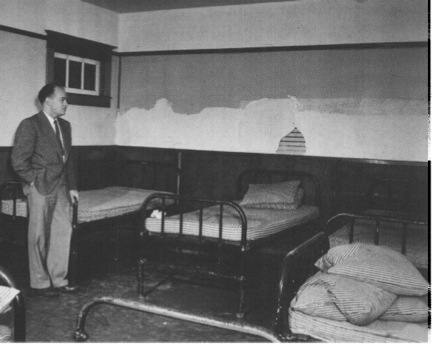
- Picture of Dr. Leonard Jan Le Vann From Heather Pringles's article "Alberta Barren" that was published in 1997 in the magazine Saturday Night
- Born: 1 August 1915
- Died: 29 September 1987 (aged 72)

Leonard Jan Le Vann (1 August 1915 – 29 September 1987) was the medical superintendent at the Alberta Provincial Training School for Mental Defectives (also known as the Michener Center) from 1949 to 1974. Although he was born and raised in the United States, Le Vann trained as a physician in Scotland. Throughout his career Le Vann wrote many articles, most of which were published during his 25-year career at the Provincial Training School, covering a broad range of topics including alcoholism, schizophrenia and experimental treatments of antipsychotic drugs. In 1974 Le Vann resigned from the training center after the Government of Alberta repealed the Sexual Sterilization Act. Concerns over how he ran the school were part of the Leilani Muir trial that took place in 1995. Although Le Vann was already deceased at the time of the trial, his name was brought to the court's attention on many occasions.

== Early life ==
Le Vann was originally an American citizen, and completed his undergraduate degree at the Ethical Culture School in New York. In 1939 he was accepted into the Junior House Surgeon program at the Royal Informatory, in Edinburgh, Scotland. His studies were briefly interrupted when he joined the Spanish Civil War as an anesthetist. Once he returned from the war he became a Junior House Surgeon, Royal Infirmary for the department of Neurosurgery in Edinburgh. He completed his training in 1943 and graduated from Lincentiate Royal College of Physicians in Edinburgh. Upon graduating, Le Vann performed one year of general practice in England during WWII at which time he was awarded a medal for bravery. In 1944, Le Vann moved to Essex, England where he began to practice psychiatry as a postgraduate student. Le Vann held a position at Sevealls Mental hospital in Colchester, Essex, UK for four years before moving on to a new endeavor.

In 1948, Le Vann moved to Canada and began to practice psychiatry at the Brandon Mental Hospital in Manitoba. Finally, in 1949 he was hired as the medical superintendent for the Provincial Training School.

== Involvement with the Alberta Training School for Mental Defectives ==
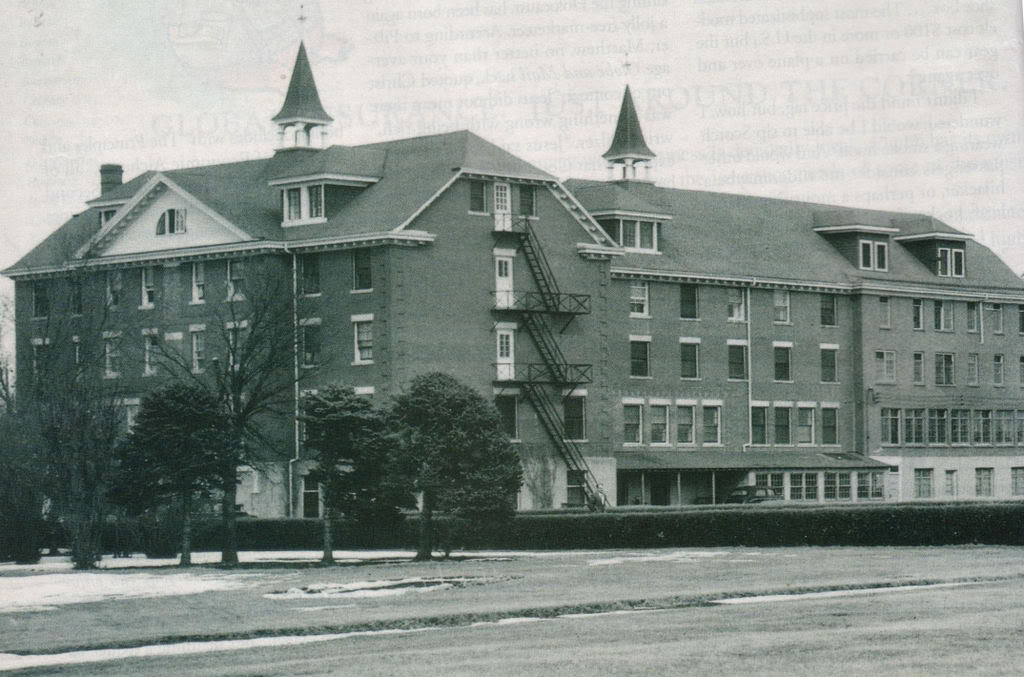
The Alberta Provincial Training School for Mental Defectives (also known as the Michener Centre)

As superintendent of the Provincial Training School Le Vann's duties were to manage the school, perform psychological analysis and operate when other professionals were not available. Another major responsibility was to evaluate students who were put forward as candidates for sterilization. Once a sterilization request was approved by the Alberta Eugenics Board the school would use a number of different techniques to sterilize the child; the most popular were bilateral salpingectomy and oophorectomies for female students and vasectomies and castration for male students.

Le Vann conduct experiments on the effectiveness of different antipsychotic drugs while at the school. He experimented with compounds such as "trifluoperazine (Le Vann 1959), thioridazine (Le Vann 1961), trifluperidol (Le Vann 1968) and haloperidol and chlorpromazine."

Le Vann also believed that for children required a balance between work, education, and play to develop to their highest potential; this became known as the workhouse model. It was standard practice to have teenage girls "spend their days scrubbing floors, making meals and dressing and changing the diapers of the severely disabled students ". Male students would be tasked with milking cows and other laborious tasks.

In 1960 Le Vann had his most famous patient admitted to the Provincial Training School. The premier of Alberta, Ernest Manning, entrusted the well-being of his son Keith to Le Vann. Le Vann provided excellent service to the premier's son, providing him with a special double room and the use of a typewriter.

Le Vann was the superintendent of the Provincial Training School for twenty-five years. He did, however, break his tenure in 1951 for a ten-month period where he was the Clinical Director of Western State Hospital in Kentucky, USA. In 1971, the newly-elected Conservative party of Alberta repealed the Sexual Sterilization Act. This had an immense impact on the school, "closing wards and tearing down dorms". Le Vann resigned from the facility in 1974. The old Provincial Training School was eventually closed and renamed the Michener Center. As of 2009 the Michener centre supports 274 adults by "providing an impressive range of recreational, social, residential, spiritual and health services."

== Controversial practices at the Provincial Training School for Mental Defectives ==
As superintendent of the Provincial Training School, Le Vann was a key player in many sterilizations and antipsychotic drug experiments that took place during the 1950s and 1960s. Little was known about his methods and procedures at the Provincial Training School until they surfaced at the Leilani Muir trial. First, it was discovered that he was never fully accredited as a psychiatrist in Canada or England. This is very shocking as it was said that during his twenty-five year reign he almost always would refer a child with a mental deficiency for sterilization, even when the child's IQ greatly exceeded seventy, the legal upper cut off for sterilization. It was as though the child's fate was sealed before the day of their trial.

Another frightening claim that has been made is that the school never informed the trainees that they were being sterilized. Instead, the Provincial Training School would often lie and tell them that their appendix had to be removed which required surgery.

In addition, Le Vann also utilized his power at the school to carry out his own experiments using the children as his "personal guinea pigs". When he was conducting his experiments on the effectiveness of different antipsychotic drugs he never obtained any consent from parents or guardians. No one was informed about what was going on during the trials. Another unethical routine that surfaced from the trial of Leilani Muir was that he would routinely castrate male "Mongols" (males with Down Syndrome) even though these children were already sterile. During the trial, it was discovered that he and Dr. Thompson were conducting experiments on the testicular tissue of the Down syndrome males.

Furthermore, it was stated that Le Vann showed very little compassion toward the children. During the trial, a quote that he wrote in the American Journal of Mental Deficiency was produced. It stated, "The comparison between the normal child and the idiot might almost be a comparison between two separate species. On the one hand, the graceful, intelligently curious, active young Homo sapiens, and on the other the gross, retarded, animalistic, early primate type individual."

Le Vann drafted his students for experiments in a controversial manner. There have been claims that state if a trainee did not adhere to his workhouse model or misbehaved they would be punished by being registered in an experimental drug trial. Furthermore, in the 1950s, a psychologist, Laughlin Taylor, "discovered that Le Vann was threatening children with sterilization if they did not behave."

Le Vann also ran the school with favouritism; in 1960 when premier of Alberta, Ernest Manning admitted his son Keith into the facility, he was "showered with privileges ". These included getting to pick his own roommate for his special double room while everyone else was forced to sleep four to a room. He was also free to keep games and a typewriter in his room, along with other small luxuries that the other trainees were not allowed.

Finally, the way he managed the school was with great attention to detail. He believed in structure, whether it was a proper way of making the beds in the wards to recording detailed notes on each student. These notes were kept by the nurses and stored a variety of information. This information ranged from bowel movements to the student's interest in the opposite sex. He also had a rule at the ward, that "no nurse, attendant, or matron was permitted to speak to a superior unless spoken to ". This was the way that he ran his school, as an authoritarian.

== Research ==
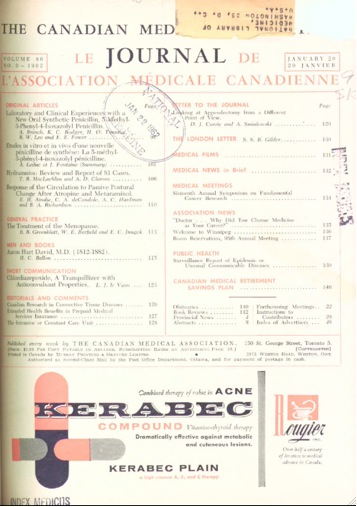
Title page of the Canadian Medical Association Journal including Le Vann's article, Chlordiazepoxide, a tranquillizer with anticonvulsant properties Canadian Medical Association Journal, 86, 123–125.

During the years that Le Vann Worked at the school, he published a number of documents ranging over many topics. The majority of his work, however, was focused on the antipsychotic drugs.

In 1953 Le Vann published an article that discussed odor and its negative implications within mental institutions and mental hospitals. In the article he discusses how using a water-soluble chlorophyll derivative has proved to be effective in reducing the odor in the wards. He hoped that by reducing the odor at these facilities there would be an improved rate of recruitment and retention of medical professionals.

Le Vann published another article in the Canadian Medical Association Journal in 1953 entitled "A Clinical Survey of Alcoholics". In this CMAJ paper he discussed the social implications of alcoholism, and shared his view stating that the government should have more strict regulations on alcoholic beverages including a safe dosage epilogue. Le Vann also describes the two types of alcoholics, primary and reactive. According to his study, the primary alcoholic is more likely to respond to group therapy. In contrast, the reactive alcoholic responds best to individual sessions. Furthermore, the reactive alcoholic is more likely to commit suicide when administered therapeutic drugs such as Disulfiram. Finally, Le Vann claimed that cultures with strong father figures are less likely to resort to alcohol and to lead a life of alcoholism.

Le Vann also researched the effectiveness of drugs such as chlordiazepoxide, chlorpromazine, haperidol, trifluperidol, and trifluoperazine dihyrochloride. In his 1959 article Trifluoperazine Dihyrochloride: an effective tranquillizing agent for behavioural abnormalities in defective children, Le Vann treated 33 patients. These consisted of "14 idiots, 14 imbeciles and two morons". All of these patients had responded negatively to the previously administered antipsychotic drugs. The experiment was administered over an eight-week period where he recorded the behaviours of the subjects that had been given the Trifluoperazine Dihyrochloride. The results showed that almost all the patients had reduced abnormal behavior and in some cases, the subject was completely controlled.

== Disputed research ==
Le Vann published another article based on the number of congenital malformations between the years 1959–1961. He suggested in his article that there is an increase in the amount of defective births and that pregnant women should take "drugs" as a way to lower the incident rate. The review of the article found there to be no correlation between the radioactive fallout and the number of birth defects. Secondly, the article points out that Le Vann never indicated what a "drug" qualified as. Finally, Adler illustrates that this seemed to be a strange practice and drugs should be administered as a last resort.

== Publications ==
- Le Vann, L. J. (1953). A clinical survey of alcoholics Canadian Medical Association Journal, 69(6), 584–588.
- Le Vann, L. J. (1953). Controlling unpleasant odors among mental patients Hospitals, 27(2), 93–94.
- Le Vann, L. J. (1959). Trifluoperazine dihydrochloride: An effective tranquillizing agent for behavioural abnormalities in defective children Canadian Medical Association Journal, 80(2), 123–124.
- Le Vann, L. J. (1960). A pilot project for emotionally disturbed children in Alberta Canadian Medical Association Journal, 83, 524–527.
- Le Vann, L. J. (1961). The use of neuroleptics in mental deficiency Revue Canadienne De Biologie / Editee Par l'Universite De Montreal, 20, 495–500.
- Le Vann, L. J. (1962). Chlordiazepoxide, a tranquillizer with anticonvulsant properties Canadian Medical Association Journal, 86, 123–125.
- Le Vann, L. J. (1963). Congenital abnormalities in Alberta Canadian Medical Association Journal, 89(12), 627.
- Le Vann, L. J. (1963). Congenital abnormalities in children born in Alberta during 1961: A survey and a hypothesis Canadian Medical Association Journal, 89(3), 120–126.
- Le Vann, L. J. (1968). A new butyrophenone: Trifluperidol. A psychiatric evaluation in a pediatric setting Canadian Psychiatric Association Journal, 13(3), 271–273.
- Le Vann, L. J. (1969). Haloperidol in the treatment of behavioural disorders in children and adolescents Canadian Psychiatric Association Journal, 14(2), 217–220.
- Le Vann, L. J. (1971). Clinical comparison of haloperidol with chlorpromazine in mentally retarded children American Journal of Mental Deficiency, 75(6), 719–723.
