= Compulsory sterilization in Canada =

Controversial medical practice in Canada

Compulsory sterilization in Canada of individuals deemed mentally unfit or "socially inadequate" was widespread in the early to mid-20th century. Laws based on the principles of eugenics led to the compulsory sterilization of thousands of individuals, many of whom were Indigenous women, persons with disabilities and intersex individuals.

The legal basis for compulsory sterilization in Canada can be traced back to the passage of the Sexual Sterilization Act in Alberta in 1928. This legislation allowed for the sterilization of mental hospital inmates to prevent the transmission of disability, resulting in 2,800 sterilizations prior to its repeal in 1972. Similar legislation existed in British Columbia from 1933 to 1973, affecting an estimated 200-400 people.

Allegations of both physically forced sterilization and coerced sterilization, with procedures either not explained or presented as 'reversible', have been reported. In 2019, an investigation by the Standing Committee on Human Rights in Canada was opened into the compulsory sterilization of Canadians. The paired reports, released in 2021 and 2022, concluded that the compulsory sterilization was ongoing in Canada, highlighting a risk to indigenous, disabled and racialized women, in addition to institutionalized persons and intersex children.

In 2021, Bill S-250 was introduced to amend section 268 of the Canadian criminal code, including forced sterilization under the definition of aggravated assault. The bill was terminated when parliament was prorogued and dissolved in January 2025, and was later reintroduced as Bill S-228.

== History of eugenics in Canada ==
Eugenics movements appeared in many European and American jurisdictions in response to historical, social, scientific, economic, and political processes occurring at the time. Francis Galton invented the term "eugenics" in 1883, building it from its Greek roots meaning "good in birth" or "noble in heredity". Eugenics "was concerned with the improvement of the human standard and focused on the influence that would give 'the more suitable races or strain of blood a better chance of prevailing speedily over the less suitable'". Eugenicists were concerned with managing the direction human evolution would take: natural selection, about which Galton's cousin Charles Darwin wrote, was insufficient to deal with the needs of modern society. If left solely to nature, eugenicists argued, the dangerous classes, who were thought to have a high-volume reproductive rate, would take over. These ideas, which were promoted abroad, were quick to gain popularity in Canada in the early 1900s. Nova Scotia was home of the first "eugenics movement" in the country when the League for the Care and Protection of Feebleminded Persons was established in the province in 1908. In Quebec, Ontario, and elsewhere, academics and physicians worked to enlist hereditarians to their ranks and publicly supported eugenics.

Eugenicists sought to actively support the reproduction of some women while at the same time seeking to ensure their cooperation in efforts to curb the reproduction of others through their support for measures like marriage regulation, institutionalization and sterilization. Many eugenicists were prepared to support certain rights for some women to the extent that these would help support the political and economic enterprise of nation building based on an inherently racial notion of who belonged. Official compulsory sterilization as a part of the eugenics movement in Canada began in the 1920s.

Ideology worked to conceal the historical and material relations that gave rise to many of the social problems of Canadian society in the late nineteenth and early twentieth centuries by allocating the causes to poverty, crime and illness within individuals instead. Adoption of proposed interventions like sterilization served as a cost-effective public health solution allowing systemic explanations to be avoided, private interests to benefit and exploitative relations to continue. In their efforts, eugenicists also encouraged the reproduction of the "fit", namely women of Anglo-Saxon, middle- and upper-class origins. Fearing a decrease in the birth rate due to their increased access to education, the achievement of work outside the home and rising infant mortality rates, eugenicists sought to bring these women "back home" by enticing them to become crusaders to the eugenic cause.

== United Nations Concerns and Review ==
The 1999 international conference of The United Nations Human Rights Commission, stated that Canada "is in violation of international law in its treatment of its aboriginal people" and that the condition of natives in Canada is "the most pressing human rights issue facing Canadians."

The United Nations Committee Against Torture requested that Canada take action against forced sterilization in their 2018 periodic report on Canada. Reviewing reports from the 1970's onward, the committee presented 2 major recommendations that the senate:

"(a) Ensure that all allegations of forced or coerced sterilization are impartially investigated, that the persons responsible are held accountable and that adequate redress is provided to the victims;

(b) Adopt legislative and policy measures to prevent and criminalize the forced or coerced sterilization of women, particularly by clearly defining the requirement for free, prior and informed consent with regard to sterilization and by raising awareness among indigenous women and medical personnel of that requirement."

The same concerns were repeated during the re-evaluation of Canada by the Inter-American Commission on Human Rights and UN Special Rapporteurs in 2019.

== Alberta ==
The most damaging sterilization program in Canadian history was afforded via the passing of the Sexual Sterilization Act of 1928. From the years 1928 to 1972, sterilizations, both compulsory and optional (when approved by guardian or parent), were performed on nearly 3000 individuals of varying ages and ethnicities. In total, over 2800 procedures were performed. Initially, the act only provisioned sterilizations where consent was given by the subject or legal guardian of the subject, depending on the competency of the individual scheduled to undergo the operation.

The 1937 amendment to the act, during the term of William Aberhart's Social Credit government, allowed for sterilizations to be carried out without consent in the case of those deemed mentally defective. Sterilization of individuals deemed mentally ill still required consent. At the end of World War II, while other eugenic sterilization programs were being phased out, Alberta continued on, even increasing the scope of eligibility for sterilizations. They continued until 1972, when approximately 5000 people were operated upon.

=== Targeted sterilization ===
Youths, minorities, and women were sterilized in disproportionately high numbers. Minors, because of their legal dependency on adults, were almost always assigned as "mental defectives", thus bypassing the parental consent requirement. Albertan Indigenous people and Métis, regardless of age, were also targeted. Towards the end of Alberta's sterilization program, Indigenous people and Métis made up 25% of the sterilizations performed.

Furthermore, those of Indigenous ancestry were disproportionately assigned the "mentally deficient" rating, which denied them their legal rights and made them eligible for sterilization without consent. Indigenous people represented only 2.3% of Alberta's general population but 6% of the institutionalized population due to systemic impediments such as poverty, discrimination, and inadequate access to education and healthcare. Women, particularly those who were young, poor, and unmarried, were also disproportionately represented; they were thought to be at high risk for prostitution or at the very least promiscuity, activities suspected of breeding further immorality. While it was conceded that sterilization would not change the behavior of these women, sterilization was intended to prevent them from bearing similarly defective progeny. Family planning initiatives targeted Indigenous women disproportionately, even following the decriminalization of contraceptives and the dismantled Alberta Eugenics Board, and referring to Indigenous women through the use of eugenic terms.

In 2018, a 30-year-old Indigenous woman underwent a tubal ligation after having given birth to her third child. She claimed that her doctor mentioned the procedure prior to her caesarean, and that she was informed it would be reversible. As such, she effectively gave her consent under false pretenses. This case was another instance where the reproductive authority of Indigenous women was being undermined.

In 2025, a Statement of Claim was issued against His Majesty the King in Right of Alberta by May Sarah Cardinal “on behalf of Indigenous women who were sterilized in public, government-owned hospitals […] without their informed consent between 1972-2018.” Ms. Cardinal opened with personal experience, citing that she underwent tubal ligation while she was seven months pregnant with her second child. She recounted the doctor informed her husband that the procedure should be done. The plaintiff (Ms. Cardinal) was not made aware that the surgery was permanent, was not offered any alternative to surgery, and does not remember providing her written consent. She recalled that she felt pressure from both her husband and the doctor to receive a tubal ligation, and has since regretted undergoing the procedure. In the end, the claim was dismissed and recommended the need for individual cases per victim.

=== Aftermath ===
Nearly 3000 people were rendered sterile by the Sexual Sterilization Act. The true nature of the Act was revealed when Leilani Muir, a former inmate of the Michener Centre (also known as the Provincial Training School for Mental Defectives, PTS), discovered in 1971 that she had been sterilized. After being admitted to the PTS at age 10 as an unwanted and abused child, Leilani was given a substandard education. She was inaccurately designated a mentally defective moron (an individual with an IQ between 51 and 70), effectively nullifying her human rights. She was administered powerful antipsychotic agents without any due cause, as she had not manifested any symptoms of psychosis during her incarceration at the PTS. Eventually, she was given an impromptu IQ test, on which she scored a 64. Shortly thereafter, she was taken before the Eugenics Board, and sterilization was authorized pending her mother's consent (which was readily given).

In 1995, in damages for her humiliation at being labeled a moron and her subsequent sterilization, Leilani was awarded C$750,000 and C$230,000 (together $1.84 million in 2025 dollars). Since the victory, another 1300 cases have been opened, several of them concerning individuals who may have actual mental disabilities.

In 2019, the Albertan government would publish a landmark report that acknowledged the forced sterilization of Indigenous women, and outlined recommendations for redress to the affected parties. Following suit, several other provinces initiated investigations into their own past sterilization practices.

== British Columbia ==
In 1933 British Columbia became one of two provinces to implement a clear eugenic sexual sterilization law. The province's Sexual Sterilization Act, legislated in 1933 and repealed in 1973, closely resembled Alberta's 1928 legislation, although the practices differed. The Act created a Board of Eugenics, consisting of a judge, psychiatrist, and social worker. The Board was granted the authority to order the sterilization, with consent, of any inmate recommended to them by a superintendent, who "if discharged ... without being subjected to an operation for sexual sterilization would be likely to produce or bear children who by reason of inheritance would have a tendency to serious mental disease or mental deficiency". Many of the individuals presented for sterilization under the province's eugenics program came through Riverview Hospital (Essondale). In comparison to the "2834 individuals sterilized under Alberta's eugenic policy, historian Angus McLaren has estimated that in British Columbia no more than a few hundred individuals were sterilized". The disparity between the numbers sterilized in the two provinces can be attributed in part to the tighter provisions of British Columbia's Sexual Sterilization Act. Whereas the Alberta legislation was amended twice to increase the program's scope and efficiency, British Columbia's sterilization program remained unchanged. Although this appears to have settled the issue, in the early 1970s the public would learn that coercive sterilizations were in fact taking place in the North in spite of the lack of legislation.

=== Targeted peoples ===
Concepts of race have long been connected to dealings with Indigenous peoples in Canada. Eugenic ideology served as a convenient justification for the terrible circumstances created by colonization and it was instrumental in determining how to interfere in the lives of Indigenous peoples. Interventions were often guided by the view that the less progressed were a hazard to society and this justified drastic invasions in their lives. Initial measures advocated in the spirit of negative eugenics including marriage regulation, segregation and sterilization were all imposed on Indigenous peoples.

=== Policy ===
The Canadian sterilization laws created a Eugenics Board that could impose sterilizations on people without their consent. This developed into a familiar practice, especially in relation to Indigenous men, women and children.

In 1926 Adolf Lorenz of Vancouver stated, "our sense of humanity is destroying humanity. We are allowing more and more of the poorer human stock to survive and reproduce. ''Sterilization was the best method to decrease the number of feeble-minded being produced. Once the feeble-minded were sterilized and the "problem cured."

In order to conclude who was a potential candidate for sterilization or institutionalization, intelligence tests were being overseen in schools, hospitals, and boys and girls schools. Intelligence tests were initiated in California, which also had the most active eugenic policy in the United States. Members of the Legislative Assembly of British Columbia, such as the "Honourable William Sloan", stated California was the leader in developing and carrying out a eugenics act.

In accordance with the Act, only people who were a "patient or in custody" of an institution as defined by the "Mental Hospitals Act" or the "Industrial Home for Girls" or the "Industrial School Act" would be affected by the Act. These individuals, termed by the Act as "inmates", would be involved or living in Essondale (now known as Riverview Psychiatric Institution), or the Boys' or Girls' Industrial Schools (for children deemed delinquent).

Decisions as to which inmates would be sterilized were to be made by the Board of Eugenics. The Board of Eugenics consisted of a judge, a psychiatrist, and a social worker who were appointed by the Lieutenant Governor in Council. The Board of Eugenics would receive recommendations from one of the above institutions if the superintendent of the institution believed that the release of an inmate would result "by reason of inheritance" in having children who would have "serious mental disease or mental deficiency.'' The recommendations were to be in writing and were to include a history of the inmate to support the institution's recommendation for sexual sterilization. The inmate may, there after, be examined or seen by the Board of Eugenics.

If after the examination of the inmate the Board of Eugenics unanimously agreed that this person would be likely to produce children who would have a serious mental disease or mental deficiency due to inheritance, the Board of Eugenics could order, in writing, that the sterilization take place. The Board of Eugenics would or could appoint the doctor who would perform the procedure.

If the Board of Eugenics believed that the inmate was not capable of consent, a spouse, guardian, or family member would be requested give their for consent. If the inmate had no family, the Provincial Secretary, the predecessor of the Superintendent of the Ministry of Social Services, was to consent on the inmate's behalf.

=== Timeline ===
- 1867: Canadian Constitution Act gives federal parliament legislative authority over "Indians, and Lands reserved for Indians
- 1870: Canadian Residential Schools in operation
- 1872: Victoria Lunatic Asylum, British Columbia's first asylum for the insane opens.
- 1873: British Columbia passes the "Insane Asylums Act."
- 1876: Canada passes the "Indian Act"
- 1878: British Columbia's Victoria Asylum closed, and the Provincial Asylum for the Insane is opened in New Westminster.
- 1883: Work therapy introduced in British Columbia's asylums
- 1883: "Eugenics" coined by Galton
- 1897: British Columbia passes the "Hospitals for the Insane Act"
- 1897: New Westminster asylum is renamed the Provincial Hospital for the Insane (PHI)
- 1904: New mental hospital opened in Coquitlam, British Columbia
- 1925: British Columbia Royal Commission on Mental Hygiene report.
- 1927: Canadian Medical Association Journal publishes the editorial "Eugenics and the Medical Profession"
- 1928: George Godwin's Columbia, or the Future of Canada is published in the To-day and To-morrow Series
- 1933: British Columbia passes "An Act respecting Sexual Sterilization"
- 1945: Essondale Report released
- 1948: Convention on the Prevention and Punishment of Genocide
- 1950: British Columbia's Provincial Hospital for the Insane is renamed Woodlands School
- 1951: Canada amends the "Indian Act"
- 1964: British Columbia's Colquitz forensic psychiatric hospital closes
- 1973: British Columbia repeals the Sexual Sterilization Act
- 1982: Canadian Charter of Rights and Freedoms signed into law
- 1985: Following a nationwide trend in de-institutionalization, British Columbia closes Tranquille
- 1986: Valleyview Hospital in British Columbia closes
- 1988: British Columbia Mental Health Society is founded
- 1998: The Mental Health Initiative in British Columbia introduces a new plan for the development of mental health services
- 2002: British Columbia releases "The Need to Know: Administrative Review on Woodlands School"
- 2003: British Columbia Minister of Children and Family Development issues apology to former residents of Woodlands

== Manitoba ==
Recent court discussions in Manitoba have investigated the legality and ethical permissibility of involuntary sterilization of the mentally disabled. Focusing on those individuals found legally incompetent, the 1990 and 1992 reports outlined the scenarios where an involuntary sterilization could be warranted. As stated by the 1990 discussion, three conditions are necessary for an individual to undergo any medical procedure.

- The individual must be informed of both the nature, and risks/benefits of the procedure.
- The consent must be voluntary, not the product of coercion, threat, or fraud.
- The individual must be competent enough to give the above consent.

Individuals who are legally incompetent include minors and sufficiently disabled adults.

The discussion reached a consensus that involuntary sterilization (or sterilization with substituted consent) is only permissible if it has an explicit positive effect on the physical or mental health of the individual: this is called therapeutic sterilization. One such case involved was a seriously disabled girl with an aversive phobia to blood, who was scheduled to undergo a hysterectomy. The rationale of the surgery was not eugenic, but rather to protect the girl from the direct mental trauma that would likely arise upon initiation of menses. This judgement was seen to be on the very threshold between therapeutic and nontherapeutic surgical intervention.

This discussion also cites a landmark case in substituted consent known as the Mrs. E. vs. Eve case. In it, a mother, "Mrs. E.", wished to have her moderately intellectually disabled daughter "Eve" sterilized to save her the emotional distress potentially caused by pregnancy and childbirth. Additionally, it was argued that Eve would neither be capable of using any other method of contraception, nor caring for a child should she become pregnant. Since the sterilization was not explicitly therapeutic and carried grave physical harm and an intrusion on Eve's rights, Mrs. E. could not be given the authority to have her daughter sterilized. It was then explored whether or not the government itself could make the decision, using parens patriae jurisdiction. Parens patriae allows the government to make authorizations in the "best interests" where no other source of consent can be attained; this includes children and mentally disabled persons. In the Eve case, the risks were deemed too high and the benefits too obscure to authorize a nontherapeutic sterilization via parens patriae jurisdiction, since a surgical sterilization is an irreversible procedure.

Pam, who chose to keep her last name anonymous to protect her family from further harm, is the mother of an Indigenous woman who received a tubal ligation at a Winnipeg hospital in 2009. She died by suicide ten months after the procedure. Pam states that her daughter believed having the procedure would result in getting her other children back and out of foster care.

== Ontario ==
Although eugenic sterilization was never instituted in Ontario, the issue saw considerable debate concurrent with the enactment of sterilization laws in Alberta and British Columbia. The formation of the Eugenics Society of Canada (ESC) in 1930 sought to organize supporters of eugenics into a coherent group in order to make their lobbying of the government more effective. Founded in Ontario, the ESC boasted a large number of physicians in its ranks, including Clarence Hincks, one of the most devoted proponents of the Alberta Sexual Sterilization Act. Other notable members included the Lieutenant-Governor of Ontario, H. A. Bruce, and eminent psychiatrist Clarence B. Farrar, who had been head of the Toronto Psychiatric Hospital since 1925.

As social traits like criminality and promiscuity began to edge off the list of heritable traits, the ESC found itself adapting its strategy to that of birth control, while maintaining a focus on economic benefit. It garnered considerable support, but was never able to table eugenic sterilization effectively in the political arena. The ESC met its end shortly after a public relations blunder in 1938, when a representative implied the ESC and the Nazi party sought to achieve similar goals through similar means. It is not surprising then, that when World War II broke out in 1939, the ESC lost nearly all of its support.

In Ontario, along with Saskatchewan and British Columbia, doctors that practiced in Indian hospitals were confirmed to have made statements that enforced the idea that Indigenous women “were less cooperative, had excessive pregnancies, and were too lazy to take a daily pill.” As such, they were candidates for a physician-inserted IUD.

In 1971, the Indian Health Service (IHS) was found to have developed a ‘Family Planning Policy’ that served to “balance between family size and income level.” This policy listed the IUD as the only alternative to sterilization.

== Northwest Territories ==
In 2019, charges were brought against Dr. Andrew Kotaska, who sterilized an Inuk woman after removing both of her fallopian tubes, despite only having her consent to remove one. This occurred in a hospital in Yellowknife. This is the first documented case of a doctor being sanctioned for compulsory sterilization in Canada. His actions were found "unethical" by investigators.

== Saskatchewan ==
Saskatchewan never passed legislation regarding the use of sterilization, however eugenics was popular during the province's history. In 1921, individuals deemed 'mentally defective' were institutionalized at a mental hospital outside of Weyburn. The assistant superintendent, A.D. Campbell believed that feeble-minded individuals should be separated in childhood and removed from areas where "contamination of normal people would be impossible".

Following Alberta's "Sexual Sterilization Act", public opinion showed to be in favour with the possible implementation of a similar act in Saskatchewan. A year later in 1929, a coalition of conservatives and progressives, "the Co-operative government", ousted the liberal administration. Among their plans for public health issues were plans for sterilization.

In 1930, a sterilization bill was in process of becoming law, however it was overturned with the implementation of a new government.

In 2017, a report revealed that several indigenous women were coerced or pressured to have tubal ligation during labour at Saskatoon Hospitals.

The amount of forced and coerced sterilization, and those pertaining to indigenous women is not documented. There is evidence that these forced procedures occurred/are occurring. Two hospitals in Saskatchewan (Fort Qu’Appelle and North Battleford) are known to have had these sterilizations performed and were documented. Although the true number is not known, there is further evidence that the Provincial Government of Saskatchewan were aware of unsanctioned sterilization procedures occurring.

The most recent forced sterilization occurred in 2018.

=== Targeted Sterilization ===
Morningstar Mercredi, a Dene woman born in Alberta, was subjected to sexual abuse at the hands of family members from a young age, then suffered the same treatment from later boyfriends. In the mid-1970s, Mercredi, 13 years old at the time, was raped and fell pregnant. She was being pressured to have an abortion; she moved to Saskatoon, residing with a friend. After having moved, now 14 years old, she slipped and fell, experiencing spotting afterwards, and subsequently went to the hospital. She was sedated by doctors, without her or her parents’ consent, and without answering Mercredi when she enquired about the status of herself and her baby before surgery. When she awoke, Mercredi stated she “was in a lot of pain. I no longer had a baby. And the only thing the doctor told me was your chances of becoming pregnant will be less than that of an average woman.” Without her knowledge, the doctor had performed a salpingectomy on her, removing an ovary and a fallopian tube. Six months after the trauma, Mercredi tried to take her own life and suffered with substance abuse. Mercredi was able to have one healthy child with her first husband after the procedure, and got sober. Overall, the circumstances of what had happened to her impacted her ability to maintain romantic relationships, and she struggled with depression and suicidal ideation. When she came forward with her story, she was sent a letter from the Saskatchewan government that claimed there was no record that the procedure had ever occurred.

In 2001, a Cree woman, using the initial S.A.T., in Saskatoon gave birth to her sixth child. She was presented with consent forms for her sterilization. S.A.T. reported that her husband told the doctors that he would not sign the forms. The mother repeatedly told staff that she did not want the surgery, and continued to cry and protest as she was given an epidural and sterilized. Following this incident, The Standing Senate Committee on Human Rights (The Committee) agreed that signing a consent form does not constitute informed consent if the patient does not fully understand, and especially when pressure is applied or the patient is under duress, and when “cognition is reduced or information about the procedure is incorrect.” S.A.T. later shared that the procedure weighed significantly on her marriage; her husband had times where he believed she had secretly consented to avoid having more children. She would avoid the healthcare system for decades, despite going into early menopause as a result of the coerced sterilization. S.A.T. has been a part of lawsuit along with other Indigenous women seeking reparations for forced sterilization, though believes it will only be successful when Canada enacts changes to its national sterilization policy to overtly ban coerced sterilization, saying “I don’t want my daughters to ever go through what I went through. I don’t want something to be taken away from them.”

Indigenous women who underwent coerced sterilization interviewed by Yvonne Boyer, a former nurse and senator, and Dr. Judith Bartlett reported feeling invisible, coerced, profiled, and powerless. They shared about the misrepresentation of the permanency of sterilization and patients not being offered contraceptive alternatives to the sterilization surgeries.

In 2015, the Saskatoon Regional Health Authority commissioned an external review that was completed in 2017 and included calls to action relating to support and reparations, cultural training and education, and law and policy reform. Subsequently, Canada was called on to take concrete action on the issue of coerced sterilization by the United Nations (UN) Committee against Torture, the Inter-American Commission on Human Rights, and two UN Rapporteurs.

The response to the review was quick and critical. The initial review commissioned by the health region was “quietly cancelled” in June of 2016. It was only after additional media pressure that the current report, and the six-month investigation prior to it, was completed.

The apology from the Saskatoon health region was considered to be genuine and full hearted, but ultimately brought to light “fears that racism against First Nations people, both explicit and systematic, is so pervasive in Canadian society that it cannot truly be eradicated from our hospitals until there has been deep structural change in the wider society.”

The Saskatoon report calls to action included mandatory cultural training for health care workers, cultural competency education in nursing and medical schools, a revision of the tubal ligation consent policies, and the implementation of a framework for Indigenous rights. These practices were intended to “ensure reproductive and traditional health practices are considered constitutionally protected rights.”

The coerced sterilization of Indigenous peoples, particularly women, has been contextualized in a number of ways. Particularly, it has been regarded as an act of biological genocide committed against Indigenous communities to reduce their numbers for a variety of reasons; access to their water, property expansion, city developments, etc., by removing or restricting their ability to procreate. Furthermore, a connection has been drawn between the coerced sterilization of Indigenous women in the present day, and the way in which Indigenous women steadily lost their matriarchal influence as colonialism progressed, and as European gender standards were established in Canada. In both cases, "derogatory and discrediting" language was used against Indigenous women to diminish their agency and control over their own bodies through the use of stereotypes.

== Quebec ==
Reports of forced and coerced sterilization in Quebec emerged publicly in the early 2020s, particularly involving Indigenous women.

In 2022, researchers affiliated with the Université du Québec en Abitibi-Témiscamingue released a report documenting testimonies from more than 35 First Nations and Inuit women regarding forced sterilization and imposed abortions in Quebec between 1980 and 2019. The report documented at least 22 cases of alleged forced sterilization and described the practice as part of a broader pattern of systemic discrimination in health care.

The Standing Senate Committee on Human Rights later stated that forced and coerced sterilization continued to occur in Canada despite the repeal of earlier eugenics legislation, disproportionately affecting Indigenous women and other marginalized groups.

== See also ==
- Canadian genocide of indigenous peoples
- Eugenic feminism
- Eugenics in the United States
- Racism in Canada
- Sterilization (medicine)
