= Living Archives on Eugenics in Western Canada =

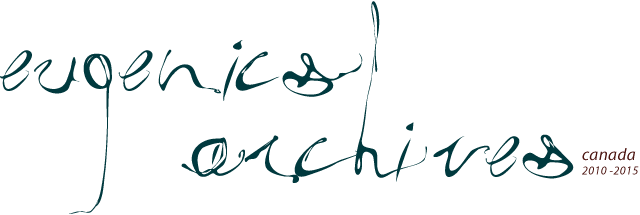
Living Archives on Eugenics of Western Canada

The Living Archives on Eugenics in Western Canada (LAE) is a major research project, led by philosophy Professor Robert Wilson of the University of Alberta. The LAE seeks to investigate and understand the many aspects of the eugenics movement in western Canada. The project began in 2009 and is funded by a grant from the Social Sciences and Humanities Research Council of Canada.

== The beginnings ==
In the mid-20th century, western Canada was a hotbed for eugenics practices as evidenced in particular by the sexual sterilization policies and laws in Alberta and British Columbia. Both provinces conducted the sexual sterilizations of those deemed mentally or developmentally ‘defective’ in some way. As Professor Wilson notes, given the perceived need for "hardy individuals" in the west at the time, “the idea may have been that we needed the best stock we can produce. If we don't we will perish.” Wilson further explains that the “typical grounds for eugenic sterilization were that a person's undesirable physical or mental conditions were heritable, and that those persons would not make suitable parents. Central among those targeted by such eugenic practices were people with a variety of disabilities, […] single mothers, First Nations and Metis people, eastern Europeans, and the poor.” In Alberta, roughly 2,800 were performed under its 1928 Sexual Sterilization Act before it was repealed in 1972. British Columbia's Sexual Sterilization Act, enacted in 1933, was ultimately repealed in 1973.

Rob Wilson is a professor of philosophy at the University of Alberta and is the LAE principal investigator. Wilson also coordinates the ‘What Sorts Network’ which is a network of scholars devoted to exploring ideas related to the question “what sorts of people should there be?” through collaboration on research projects and scholarly events. Wilson's interest in eugenics specifically in Western Canada took shape when “in 2001, several students spoke to him about the[ir] relatives who had been institutionalized and sterilized”. As Wilson exclaims, “I was stunned. It was so close to home”. From this, more interest was garnered to delve into further specific work on eugenics practices in Western Canada, especially given that there were still many survivors of sexual sterilization in Alberta. Out of this came LAE.

== SSHRC Grant and LAE's Projects ==
In 2010, Professor Wilson was awarded a grant from the Social Sciences and Humanities Research Council of Canada (SSHRC) for his project entitled “Living Archives on Eugenics in Western Canada” in the form of a Community-University Research Alliance (CURA) grant. The CURA grant supports research alliances between post-secondary institutions and various community and voluntary organizations. Given the intense personal nature of the subject matter that the LAE engages in, partnerships with community organizations that have been involved in supporting the victims of eugenics as well as advocating for justice on their behalf are integral to LAE's success. As Wilson notes, the mission of LAE is to “create innovative academic resources for scholars across many academic fields, but its true value lies in how it actively involves community organizations and vulnerable individuals whose stories have most often been left out of what we might call the ‘Canadian collective memory."

The three major components of the CURA include a research component, education/training component, and a knowledge-mobilization component, all of which must “meet the needs of the research institutions and its community partners." The LAE undertakes various projects that engage these components with a view toward the guiding objective of preserving the “Canadian collective memory” of eugenics practices in Western Canada in order to bring new light and perspectives on this part of its history. LAE's projects include (1) a more thorough, complete, and systematic archival collection that is accessible to the public as well as scholars from various fields; (2) the recording and archiving of oral histories told by eugenics survivors regarding their personal recollections of being institutionalized and sterilized; (3) the creation of an interactive website that is accessible to the public; (4) and developing high-school and university level curricula for the various disciplines that engage in the history of eugenics in Western Canada;

Given the goal of preserving the personal stories of eugenics survivors, archiving the oral testimonies of sterilization survivors is one of the major projects of LAE. Leilani Muir, the first sterilization survivor to successfully sue the province of Alberta for wrongful sterilization under the Sexual Sterilization Act of Alberta, has partnered with LAE, serving on its governing board, and has also provided her personal account of being institutionalized and sterilized for LAE's archives. For Muir, involvement with the LAE helps to fulfill a personal mission: “We’ve got to make sure this never happens again because my attitude is if I don't talk about this and keep it out of the forefront, history will repeat itself in some way because history always does repeat." For Professor Wilson, having the support and involvement of sterilization survivors and their families is essential to the success of LAE, “and not just to have them at arm's length to the project but to really make them integral to what we're doing – providing oral histories and telling their stories and having a voice."

== Alberta Eugenics Awareness Week ==
One of the annual highlights of the work conducted by LAE is Alberta Eugenics Awareness Week (AEW). First held in October 2011, these weeks have included a plethora of events that are designed to engage reflection and discussion regarding eugenics in Western Canada through various mediums. Each AEAW has also been honoured by Edmonton Mayor Stephen Mandel's proclamations of those weeks as the official 'Alberta Eugenics Awareness Week' in the city of Edmonton.

The 2011 Awareness Week included an art exhibit entitled ‘The Collective Memory Project: Responses to Eugenics in Alberta’ which featured “more than 20 contemporary works ranging from acrylics, digital prints and collages to pencil sketches, transfers, and archival photos” by “12 visual artists from across the country." Also during the 2011 awareness week was included a public screening and discussion of The Sterilization of Leilani Muir, a documentary based on the personal experience of Leilani Muir. Other events held during the week include lectures, discussion groups, dramatic performances, research presentations, and public talks.

During the 2012 Awareness Week, events included panel discussions about eugenics and marginalized groups, a celebration of the 40th anniversary of the repeal of the Sexual Sterilization Act of Alberta, and a performance of the play "Invisible Child" based on the life of Leilani Muir.

== LAE alliances ==
The LAE is partnered by many institutions, organizations, and individuals.

=== Postsecondary institutions ===
- University of Alberta and its Department of Philosophy, Faculty of Extension, Arts Research Centre, Humanities Computing, Office of the Dean of the Faculty of Arts, and the John Dossetor Health Ethics Centre.
- University of Calgary and its Community Rehabilitation and Disability Studies Program, Community Health Services.
- University of Guelph
- University of Saskatchewan and its Department of History and Vice-President of Research.
- University of Lethbridge
- York University’s Office of the Vice President of Research and Innovation

=== Community organizations ===
- Alberta Association of Community Living
- Neighborhood Bridges
- Field Law
- Maa and Paa Theatre
- Edmonton Public Library
- Provincial Archives of Alberta
- Legal Archives Society of Alberta
- Silversky Solutions
- Alberta Public Interest Research Interest Group
- NeWest
- American Association of People with Disabilities

=== Individual partners ===
- Allan Garber, Parlee McLaws LLP.
- Judy Lytton, Sterilization Survivor, Activist. Member of LAE Governing Board.
- Leilani Muir, Sterilization Survivor, Activist. Member of LAE Governing Board.
- Nicolas Supina III

== Organizational structure ==
The LAE is led by Professor Robert Wilson, who serves as project firector. Moyra Lang is the project coordinator. The primary objectives of the LAE are achieved through six 'Theme Teams' which are made up of individuals from academia as well as from community organizations.

=== Traditional archives ===
The primary role of the traditional archives team is to do basic research into the various sources relevant to eugenics in Western Canada and improve access to such resources. This team includes,

- Erica Dyck (Team Leader), Department of History, University of Saskatchewan
- Geoffrey Reaume, School of Health Policy & Management, York University
- Kathryn Harvey, Head Archival and Special Collections, University of Guelph
- Raymond Frogner, Archives, Collections and Knowledge Division, British Columbia Provincial Archives
- Frank Stahnisch, Departments of History, Community Health Sciences, and the Faculty of Medicine, University of Calgary
- Molly Ladd-Taylor, Department of History, York University
- Paul Lombardo, Georgia State University College of Law
- Paul Weindling, Department of History, Philosophy, and Religion, Oxford Brookes University

=== Surviving A Eugenic Past ===
This team develops inclusive collective remembering about Canadian eugenics and its legacy; delivering video narratives & input into curriculum materials. Its members include

- Nicola Fairbrother (Team Leader), Director of Neighborhood Bridges Community Organization
- Judy Lytton
- Leilani Muir
- Glenn Griener, Department of Philosophy, University of Alberta
- Kyle Whitfield, Centre for Health Promotion Studies, University of Alberta
- Joanne Faulkner, School of Humanities and Language, University of New South Wales
- John Sutton, Macquarie Centre for Cognitive Science, Macquarie University
- Nick Supina III, Community Visual Artist
- Molly Ladd-Taylor

=== Reproductive Choice in an Ableist World ===
This team records individual narratives and promotes community dialogue on eugenics, inclusion, & social policies affecting people with disabilities.

- Bruce Uditsky (Team Leader), CEO, Alberta Association for Community Living
- Anne Hughson, Community Rehabilitation and Disability Studies, University of Calgary
- Heidi Janz, John Dossetor Health Ethics Centre, University of Alberta
- Judy Lytton
- Amy Kaler, Department of Sociology, University of Alberta
- Leilani Muir
- Christine Ferguson, School of Critical Studies, University of Glasgow
- Nick Supina III, Community Visual Artist
- Dick Sobsey (ret.), Department of Educational Psychology and director of John Dossetor Health Ethics Centre, University of Alberta

=== Post-Eugenic Futures ===
This team explores issues at the interface of disability, technology, reproduction, and human enhancement.

- Gregor Wolbring (Team Leader), International Centre for Bioethics, Culture, and Disability, University of Calgary
- Geoffrey Reaume
- Heidi Janz
- Amy Kaler
- Doug Wahlsten, Department of Psychology, University of Alberta
- Mike Billinger, Anthropologist

=== Technical team ===
This team develops a digital platform for research and public outreach, and facilitating project management.

- Natasha Nunn (Team Leader)
- Michael Billinger
- Glenn Griener
- Kathryn Harvey
- Kyle Whitfield
- Raymond Frogner
- Colette Leung

=== Eugenic Frames ===
This team provides resources for reflection on what eugenics is, past and present, and on the contextual location of eugenics in Western Canada in both Canada and the rest of the world.

- Rob Wilson (Team Leader)
- Alexandra Minna-Stern, Department of Medicine, University of Michigan
- Molly Ladd-Taylor
- Michael Billinger
- Paul Weindling
- Lene Koch, Department of Health Services, University of Copenhagen
- Paul Lombardo
- Doug Wahlsten
- Kyle Whitfield
- Joanne Faulkner
- Erika Dyck
- Gregor Wolbring
- John Sutton
- Wendy Kline, Department of History, University of Cincinnati
- Karen Stote

=== Interns ===
- Sheila Rae Gibbons
- Justin Fisher
- Rachel Malena
- Laura Shaw
- Amanda Shea
- Kristina Rissling
- Keith Flysak
- Shannon Colville
- Amy Dyrbye
- Caroline Lyster
- Faun Rice
- Joelle Tomek
- Joshua St. Pierre
- Megan Bertagnolli
- Sabujkoli Bandopadhyay
- Viktoriya Yakovleava
- Anne Pasek
- Ameer Farooq
- Samantha Balzer
- Sally Scott
- Megan Farnel
- Graham Mah
- Bradley Lafortune
- Jenney Choi
- Frances Chiu
- Jacalyn Ambler
- Aida Roige

== Online resources ==
- LAE Official Website
- LAE Online Blog
- LAE on Twitter
- LAE on Facebook
- 2011 Alberta Eugenics Awareness Week Highlights
- 2012 Alberta Eugenics Awareness Week Highlights
- 'What Sorts of People' Official Website
- Listing of Scholarly Work Produced/Published through LAE
