= Margaret Gunn =

Canadian activist

Susan Margaret Rogers Gunn (1889 - December 1989) was a Canadian activist. Gunn was the third president of the United Farm Women of Alberta (UFWA), following the presidencies of Irene Parlby (1916-1920) and Marion Sears (1920–24), and served in that role from 1924 to 1929. She was a noted "country life advocate" and detested cities.

== UFWA and Sexual Sterilization Advocacy ==
During the 1920s the UFWA was an ardent supporter of legislation in Alberta requiring the forced sterilization of those deemed mentally defective or feebleminded and it became one of its most active and powerful lobbying forces. Due partly to the UFWA’s effectiveness in garnering widespread favourable public opinion for forced sterilization, the Sexual Sterilization Act of Alberta was enacted and the Alberta Eugenics Board was subsequently formed for the purpose of administering sterilizations. Margaret Gunn was at the forefront of this sterilization crusade. In her 1924 presidential address to the UFWA, she called for the government to pursue a policy of "racial betterment through the weeding out of undesirable strains" since, as she argued, ‘democracy was never intended for degenerates"’. In the following year, the United Farmers of Alberta passed a resolution calling for mandatory sterilization of the mentally unfit in order to prevent them "from reproducing their kind."

A puzzling and even "unsettling" aspect about Gunn’s (as well as other women’s support of sexual sterilization such as those who made up the famous five) proactive support of state-sanctioned forced sterilization in Alberta is the fact that "many of their sisters were directly targeted by [such] segregation and sterilization programs." One way to think about Gunn’s motivation for encouraging such policies may be due to her overarching concern of promoting country living and encouraging the creation of strong "cooperative communities" in Alberta, thus creating the need for policies that lower the possibility of those who might threaten the strength and viability of such communities – i.e., the feebleminded, mental and/or developmentally defective, etc. – from being born into such communities. As Gunn argued, the constant procreation of derelicts would "lower the vitality of our civilization" and had to be prevented. Gunn argued for a "country life ideology" which, in practice, required a "co-operative ethos" as opposed to an individualistic one, and as such, required strong and able individuals to make it successful. As she noted regarding the activities of the junior league of the UFWA and the United Farmers of Alberta, "all this co-operative study, co-operative work, co-operative play, is merely building for the future co-operative community. Boys and girls trained in this group activity are learning…how to work with others to mutual advantage, are practising the co-operative principle, and are discarding the competitive system."
