= Leilani Muir =

Canadian woman who sued over wrongful sterilization (1944–2016)

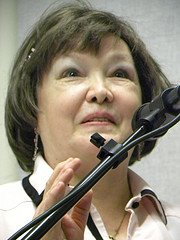
Leilani Muir speaks at an Alberta Eugenics Awareness Week event in October 2011.

Leilani Marietta (O'Malley) Muir (July 15, 1944 – March 14, 2016), previously named Leilani Marie Scorah, was the first person to file a successful lawsuit against the Alberta government for wrongful sterilization under the Sexual Sterilization Act of Alberta. Her case led to the initiation of several other class action lawsuits against the province for wrongful sterilization. Muir's advocacy shed light on eugenics, institutionalisation, human rights for persons with a disability, and self-advocacy.

== Early life ==
Muir was born in Calgary, Alberta, Canada into a poor family that frequently moved. She was an unwanted, unloved, and abused child. Her mother looked for ways to remove her from the family and, when Muir was eight, placed her in the Midnapore Convent for a month. Then, in 1953, her mother sent an application for Muir to be institutionalized at the Provincial Training School for Mental Defectives (also known as the Michener Centre) in Red Deer, Alberta. At that time there were no vacant beds.

Two years later on July 12, 1955, shortly before her 11th birthday, Muir was admitted into the institution solely on the basis of information provided by her mother, without any diagnostic testing. She thought she had been sent to an orphanage. Under superintendent Leonard Jan Le Vann, a precondition for admission into the Provincial Training School was a signature from Muir's mother permitting the legal enforcement of compulsory sterilization. Over the years, Muir was educated to a grade 5 level and saw her mother only intermittently until her departure from the institution at the age of 20.

== Background on eugenics ==
Muir’s sterilization was part of a progression towards forced sterilization and eugenics that began in the 19th century.

In 1883, Francis Galton, a cousin of Charles Darwin, coined the term eugenics, but the concept had been around since the time of Plato. In essence, eugenics is a combination of Mendel's laws of genetics and Darwin’s theory of evolution. It was believed that many mental and behavioral traits were passed down from parents to their children. People considered inferior or damaging to the human race included: mental defectives (i.e., persons with a developmental disability or mental disorder), criminals, psychotics, lazy people, social degenerates, mixed races (African-Caucasian, etc.), immigrants and First Nations people, Catholics, alcoholics, epileptics, unwed mothers, poor people, and others. These "undesirables" were seen as unfit to have children and were bred out of the population through sterilization practices.

Eugenics has been attempted in many countries in many ways, including practicing sterilization, castration, and homicide on "defective" persons. An active eugenics movement occurred in the United Kingdom in the 19th century. By 1907, the first sterilization law was enacted in the United States and, in 1910, a eugenics section of the American Breeders Association and the Eugenics Records Office were established. Both affiliations were largely influenced by Charles Davenport and Harry Laughlin, but both were headed by Davenport himself. By the 1920s and 1930s, forced sterilizations were performed in nearly thirty US states.

Hitler much admired the eugenics practices in the United States and, after becoming the German chancellor in 1933, the Nazis emulated and applied these practices on anyone whom they deemed to be a degenerate, especially Jews.

Scientists discredited the eugenics movement after witnessing the events of World War II and the acts committed by the Nazis in the name of genetic cleansing. Forced sterilization was declared a crime against humanity in the Nuremberg Trials. While sterilization programs began to die down in the United States and Great Britain, they continued in Canada's western provinces of British Columbia, Alberta, and Saskatchewan. Notably, it was only in Alberta that a sterilization law had been vigorously implemented. By order of the Alberta Eugenics Board, Muir and 2,831 children and adults were sterilized between the passing of the Sexual Sterilization Act in 1928 and its repeal in 1972.

One of the main advocates of eugenics who helped pass Alberta's sterilization law was the first female magistrate of the British Empire, Emily Murphy, who was also one of The Famous Five who campaigned for women's rights in the 1920s. Under her influence, many Albertans, especially farmers who saw first-hand what selective breeding can do to enhance livestock quality, agreed that eugenics could be used to improve human stock as well. One of the people influenced by Murphy’s opinions was the Minister of Agriculture and Health, George Hoadley. Hoadley convened the first meeting of the Alberta Eugenics Board a year after the Sexual Sterilization Act was passed. This Board interviewed all people considered to have inferior genetic stock and approved the sterilization of 4,725 of 4,800 cases. The three-member Board elected a fourth member John M. MacEachran to act as chairman, a position he held until his death in 1965. MacEachran was a key figure in promoting the continued sterilization of people who were seen as degenerates and "incapable of intelligent parenting." Inmates of Alberta mental institutions were particularly vulnerable to sterilization under this Act and the Board's practices.

== The sterilization of Leilani Muir ==
Muir had lived at the Provincial Training School for two years and four months before she underwent an intelligence quotient (IQ) test. Low IQ was a major criterion for sterilization. She was brought to the Calgary Guidance Clinic to take an IQ test a week before meeting with the Eugenics Board and scored an overall mark of 64. Muir was formally diagnosed as a "Mental defective Moron". The Board used Muir's IQ score as sufficient grounds for her sterilization, as a score lower than 70 was considered degraded intelligence. Although she was not told at the time, the Board ordered that she be sterilized. Other factors that increased the likelihood of sterilization were Muir's Irish-Polish background and Catholic religion, her presumed incapability of intelligent parenting, and that she had "shown definite interest in the opposite sex" while living in a public institution.

On January 19, 1959, doctors performed a bilateral salpingectomy (destruction of the fallopian tubes) on Muir. She had been told that the surgery was to remove her appendix. She would not find out until nearly a decade later why she could not bear children.

== The case ==
In 1965, Muir left the Provincial Training School for a life of independence. Over the next 15 years, she worked as a waitress and had two failed marriages. During her first marriage, she was unable to conceive a child. After fertility tests, a doctor informed Muir that she had been intentionally sterilized and the procedure was irreversible. Her attempts to adopt a child were denied because of the stigma of her history as a former inmate of an institution.

Muir became depressed and sought professional help in 1989 while living in British Columbia. To determine if she would be a good candidate for group therapy, she took another IQ test and scored 89. Considering her past institutionalization, this score surprised Dr. George Kurbatoff who administered the test, and suggested that she did not have a mental defect now that she lived in a better environment.

Not long after this IQ test had proved that Muir was of normal intelligence and should never have been sterilized or placed in the Provincial Training School for Mental Defectives, she sought legal counsel to sue the Alberta government on her behalf for wrongful sterilization. The four-week trial began on June 22, 1995, with the Honorable Madame Joanne B. Veit presiding. On January 25, 1996, Veit ruled in favor of Muir awarding C$740,780 in damages with an additional C$230,000 for legal costs. Veit proclaimed:

In 1959, the province wrongfully surgically sterilized Ms. Muir ... the particular type of confinement of which Ms. Muir was a victim resulted in many travesties to her young person: loss of liberty, loss of reputation, humiliation and disgrace, pain and suffering, loss of enjoyment of life, loss of normal developmental experiences, loss of civil rights, loss of contact with family and friends, [and] subjection to institutional discipline.

Since Muir’s case, the Alberta government has apologized for the forced sterilization of over 2,800 people. Nearly 850 Albertans who were sterilized under the Sexual Sterilization Act were awarded C$142 million in damages.

In 1996, a documentary was released about Muir's life called The Sterilization of Leilani Muir. Produced by the National Film Board of Canada, the film won awards at the 1997 HESCA Film Festival in Lake Tahoe, Nevada, and the Western Psychological Association Film Festival in Seattle, Washington.

== Private life ==
After the trial, Muir lived in Devon, Alberta with her pets. She was an active board member of the Living Archives on Eugenics in Western Canada Community University Research Alliance, and enjoyed spending her free time with family, friends, pets, and other animals. She continued to speak about her life story at international conferences and wrote an autobiography called A Whisper Past: Childless after Eugenic Sterilization in Alberta. The play Invisible Child: Leilani Muir and the Alberta Eugenics Board was performed by MAA & PAA Theatre at the 2012 Edmonton International Fringe Festival. Muir died at home in Devon, Alberta on March 14, 2016.
