= Provincial Training School =

Institution in Alberta, Canada, 1923–1977

Coordinates: 52.27296°N 113.7879°W

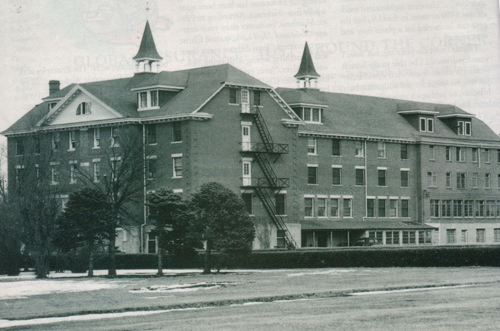
The Provincial Training School in Red Deer, Alberta. Alberta Public Archives

The Provincial Training School (PTS) for what was then termed 'Mental Defectives' in Red Deer, Alberta, Canada, operated as an institution for mentally disabled children and adults between 1923 and 1977, at which time it was renamed the Michener Centre. It aimed to provide care and training to facilitate the integration of individuals with intellectual disabilities into their communities. While today it houses a service for persons with developmental disabilities, the nearly one-century-old facility is preceded by a diverse history, marked by eugenic practices like involuntary sterilization.

== History of the building ==
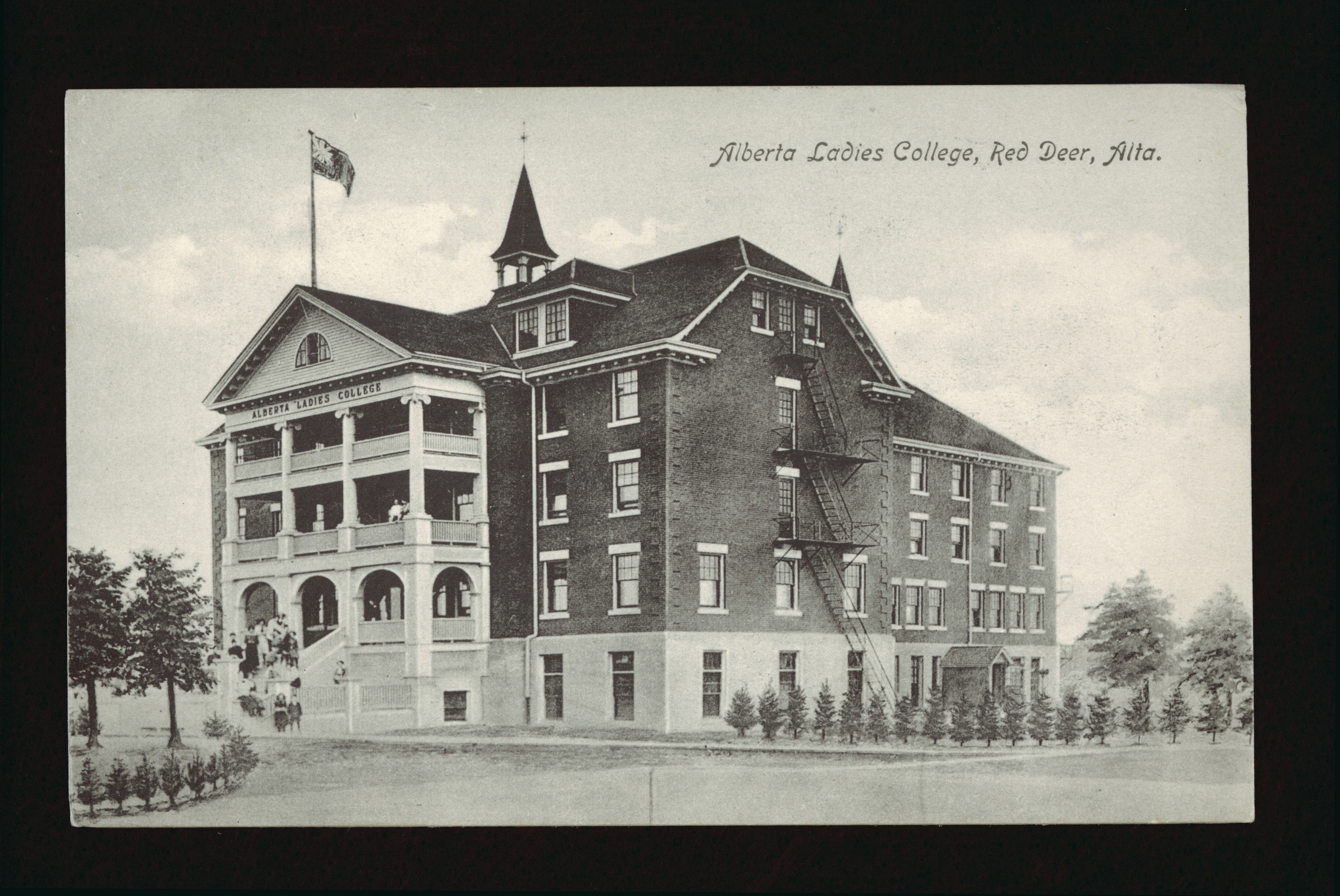
Exterior view of Alberta Ladies College, Red Deer, Alberta, and adjacent grounds. 1912. University of Alberta Libraries Historical Postcard Collection.

The three-storey building, which once housed the Provincial Training School, has undergone many administrative changes since its construction in 1913. Located on the Michener hill in the city of Red Deer, Alberta, it originally housed the Alberta Ladies' College of Red Deer as one of Western Canada's finest residential college buildings at the time. In 1916, the provincial government converted the college into a psychiatric hospital for shell-shocked soldiers. It was not until 1923 that the facility saw the inception of the Provincial Training School for Mental Defectives, which would serve as a care facility for mentally disabled people until 1973. Today, it functions as Alberta Health Services Administration Building the rest of the buildings function as PDD Michener Services residential care facility for persons with developmental disabilities and currently has 123 residents.

== Aims and purpose ==
In 1923, the Provincial Training School (PTS) was conceived as a residential school, aiming to enable the "academic, vocational and personal development of retarded children and young adults". It allowed developmentally disabled children to live apart from psychiatrically diagnosed children, and provided the parents of these children respite of the daily struggles of raising children with special needs. Before the opening of the PTS, Alberta's mentally disabled children that were not living with their families were usually grouped with psychiatric patients in care facilities as far away as Brandon, Manitoba. At its founding, the PTS was viewed as a progressive step for Canadians because it focused on segregating the "mentally retarded from the mentally ill," and was claimed to support the shift "from incarceration to education". In due time, the PTS expanded its function to include occupational therapy and vocational training, which was meant to serve as stepping-stones for the residents' integration into the larger community. In the 1950s, the PTS claimed to centre its efforts on "increasing the trainee's independence," and in the 1960s, on "resident training". The view of the school as "humane, well run, evolving as attitudes towards feeble-mindedness evolved," was upheld by Albertans throughout the span of its operation. However, rising population figures indicated that most residents of the PTS did not, in fact, return to their communities. To the greater Red Deer community, the PTS served as its chief employer and enriched the local community with its own farm and opulent gardens. The school featured state-of-the-art classrooms, a chain of dormitories, and even a separate hospital. This idealistic establishment appealed to even Alberta's most prestigious families, including ex-Premier of Alberta, Ernest Manning, who enrolled his eldest son, Keith, at the school.

== Sexual sterilization ==
After the passing of the Sexual Sterilization Act of Alberta (SSAA) in 1928, the Provincial Training School (PTS) oversaw and performed the sterilizations of over 2,800 persons to improve society by preventing the genetic transmission of undesirable traits as well as to protect unfit individuals from the burdens of parenthood. Other Albertan facilities that also performed similar procedures were the Alberta Hospital in Ponoka and the Oliver Mental Hospital in Edmonton.

To assess persons' eligibility for sterilization, the Alberta government created the Alberta Eugenics Board, headed by University of Alberta psychologist, John M. MacEachran, one year after the enactment of the SSAA. Board members persistently searched the province for prospective subjects, and thus frequently found themselves visiting the PTS. Whether or not an individual was suited for sterilization was decided by a panel of four people (two medical professionals and two laypeople), formed by the Alberta Eugenics Board, who presented patients with a single psychological test. Answers to this informal, interview-style test, including questions such as "At what age does a child begin to walk?" and "How do you like it here?" guided the Board's ten-minute review of each case. Patients rarely had knowledge of the true purpose of the meetings; even on the day of their surgery, they were often only told that their appendix would be removed. Most would not discover what had been done to them at the PTS until years after leaving the school and, for some, the news came after several unsuccessful attempts to conceive. Initially, the procedure required consent from the patient or from a parent or guardian, but this pre-requisite was repeatedly ignored after 1937. Sometimes, authorization forms, required for surgeries to be carried out, were signed by officials before any assessments had been conducted.

The fact that only a handful of the nearly 900 cases presented to the Eugenics Board by Leonard Jan Le Vann, medical superintendent of the PTS, were rejected has raised questions about the integrity of the assessments and decision-makers alike. Because of the Board's enduring trust in the superintendent's judgement, many individuals who did not meet the formal criteria for sterilization were nonetheless rendered infertile. Among those targeted were children with both subpar IQs (<70) and IQs highly exceeding the upper limit of 703, those with physical or mental disorders and those ailed by heritable disease. Other traits targeted by the eugenic procedure were ethnic minority status, poverty, criminal behaviour, alcoholism and promiscuity. Women, eastern European immigrants, First Nations people, and Catholics represented a disproportionate number of those sterilized at the PTS. The Eugenics Board never stopped to question the individuals' backgrounds or why Le Vann fought for their sterilization. As far as policy-makers and enforcers were concerned, all of these groups had one thing in common: they were "a menace to society".

L. J. Le Vann presented an even more peculiar type of case to the Board, which ultimately approved it 30 times. In his private research, Le Vann studied spermatogenesis in the testicles of boys with Down's syndrome. To supply his research with tissue samples, the medical director ordered not only vasectomies but also orchiectomies of males with Down syndrome. This practice was carried out although it was already known within the medical community at the time that males with trisomy 21 are sterile. The Board which approved of the procedure included Margaret Thompson, one of the leading medical geneticists in Canada at the time.

== Life at the PTS ==
While the name of the facility implies a school for 'mental defectives', many of those admitted to the Provincial Training School (PTS) were orphaned or simply unwanted by their families. Consequently, many admitted students were socially awkward as a result of deficiencies in certain social skills. Often, high-functioning children stemming from abrasive families were admitted due to misdiagnosis. Furthermore, such unnecessary admissions were exacerbated by the school's non-standardized admissions procedures, including mandatory IQ tests that were insensitive to some patients' abusive upbringing or other relevant socio-economic factors.

In the school, residents were divided among different wards corresponding to 'hierarchies of disability'. The more capable children were quickly put to work by the school's superintendent, L. J. Le Vann. 'High-grade' teenage girls scrubbed floors, prepared meals, and dressed the severely disabled, while the boys tended to farmland and milked cows. A former resident, Donald Passey, personally recalled the physical disciplining by staff members at the school. He was once slapped and punched while held up against the wall; even severely impaired children sometimes suffered physical abuse. Glen Sinclair, also an ex-student at the PTS, described his role at the school as the subject of constant observation. He and his dorm-mates were denied all privacy and prohibited any outside access without adult consent; even the windows only opened six inches wide. Any attempts at rebellion such as refusal to eat, sleep, wake or work, as well as sexual expression, resulted in brutal punishment. This included corporeal beatings, incarceration in time-out rooms, and even enrolment in drug experiments with potent tranquilizers such as phenobarbital, chlorpromazine, and haloperidol. L. J. Le Vann often threatened misbehaviour with sterilization, a procedure which soon became customary at the school's hospital. While children were punished for even slight expression of sexuality, the PTS nevertheless accommodated the hetero- and homosexual abuse of its students by its staff members.

Leilani Muir was a resident at PTS and was sterilized, without her consent, in 1959. In 1996, she won a lawsuit against the province of Alberta for wrongfully admitting her and sterilizing her against her will, and that her life after PTS has proven her ability to live a normal functioning life in the larger society. However, the province's defence, Crown lawyer William Olthius, argued that Muir's ability to "make it" since leaving the PTS is a sign of the school's "appropriate and high-quality curriculum of academic schooling, vocational training and life skills." Muir, however, claimed that she was poorly educated during her time at the PTS.

== Time-out rooms ==
As a means of controlling its residents, the Provincial Training School (PTS) utilized much dreaded time-out rooms. Each of the dormitories at the PTS featured a room in the direct line of sight of staff and residents. Bare, concrete walls and heavy, locked doors, with only a tiny orifice for food delivery, enclosed the empty cellars. The rooms contained one-way mirrors, through which the incarcerated individual could be monitored by both staff and residents, and sometimes a small window. Lacking access to a proper toilet, residents in time-out rooms were forced to relieve themselves on the floor where a drain was installed. Inmates were usually stripped naked during their time in the time-out rooms to avert their potential self-harm. Only at night would a mattress be laid on the ground for inmates to rest on. Some were debilitated with straitjackets.

Most frequently, a resident would land in a time-out room after an unsuccessful attempt to flee the school, at which time staff ensured public awareness through wailing sirens and intrusive ward searches. The dehumanizing effect of the time-out rooms allowed staff to handle residents with derogatory and senseless conduct, ultimately depriving them of their human rights and dignity. Time-out rooms served as a powerful method of "physical and psychological, reactive and proactive control".

== Management and staff ==
From 1949 until 1974, American-born Leonard Jan Le Vann was the medical superintendent of the Provincial Training School (PTS). Upon arriving at the school, Le Vann took on positions both in surgery and psychiatry, which enabled him to assess students as well as perform operations when necessary. Past PTS staff recalled his meticulous attention to detail, especially in delegating their tasks. Le Vann ordered nurses to maintain extensive reports on everything from children's bowel movements to their sexual interests. He also commanded a very strict work environment in which no personnel spoke to their supervisors, unless spoken to. During the 1960s, Le Vann "ran the institution almost...like a Gestapo," a former PTS psychologist remembers. It was later revealed that Le Vann had kept several significant secrets. In 1995, 8 years after his death, it was found that the medical director never actually obtained accreditation to practice psychiatry. His first wife also discovered that, in order to disguise his Jewish descent, the man had undergone a name-change at a young age.

The PTS witnessed a drastic increase (500%) in the number of residents between its initiation in 1923 and 1959, at which time the school housed around 1,400 children. As oversight of the school became obscured, the PTS sought to expand its employee base. However, because most psychologists dreaded working in a mental institution, the PTS's efforts to recruit qualified staff faced numerous shortcomings. It did not help that the school was situated in Red Deer, a prairie town of around 30,000, where the number of skilled applicants was minuscule. In these times of desperation, Le Vann once hired someone with no professional experience to fill the position of head psychologist. This person was responsible for the IQ tests that were part of the assessment protocol for admission to the school. The resulting, arbitrary procedure caused numerous children without disabilities to be admitted to the school. An ex-employee of the PTS revealed, "Your qualification was grade twelve and they hired just about anybody, as long as they didn't have a criminal record". Le Vann even went so far as to endorse admitting high-functioning children in order to exploit their abilities as forced labour.

== End of Michener ==
In 2013, the Provincial Government of Alberta announced the closing of the Michener Centre due to provincial budget constraints. The government intended to phase the Centre out by gradually moving residents into other private or not-for-profit facilities on up to its scheduled completion and final closing date in April 2014. Despite its history, the closing of Michener Centre has become controversial in that current public perception of the centre is quite positive due to its more recent history of providing quality care for residents with high psychological and developmental support needs.
