= Emily Murphy =

Canadian politician (1868–1933)

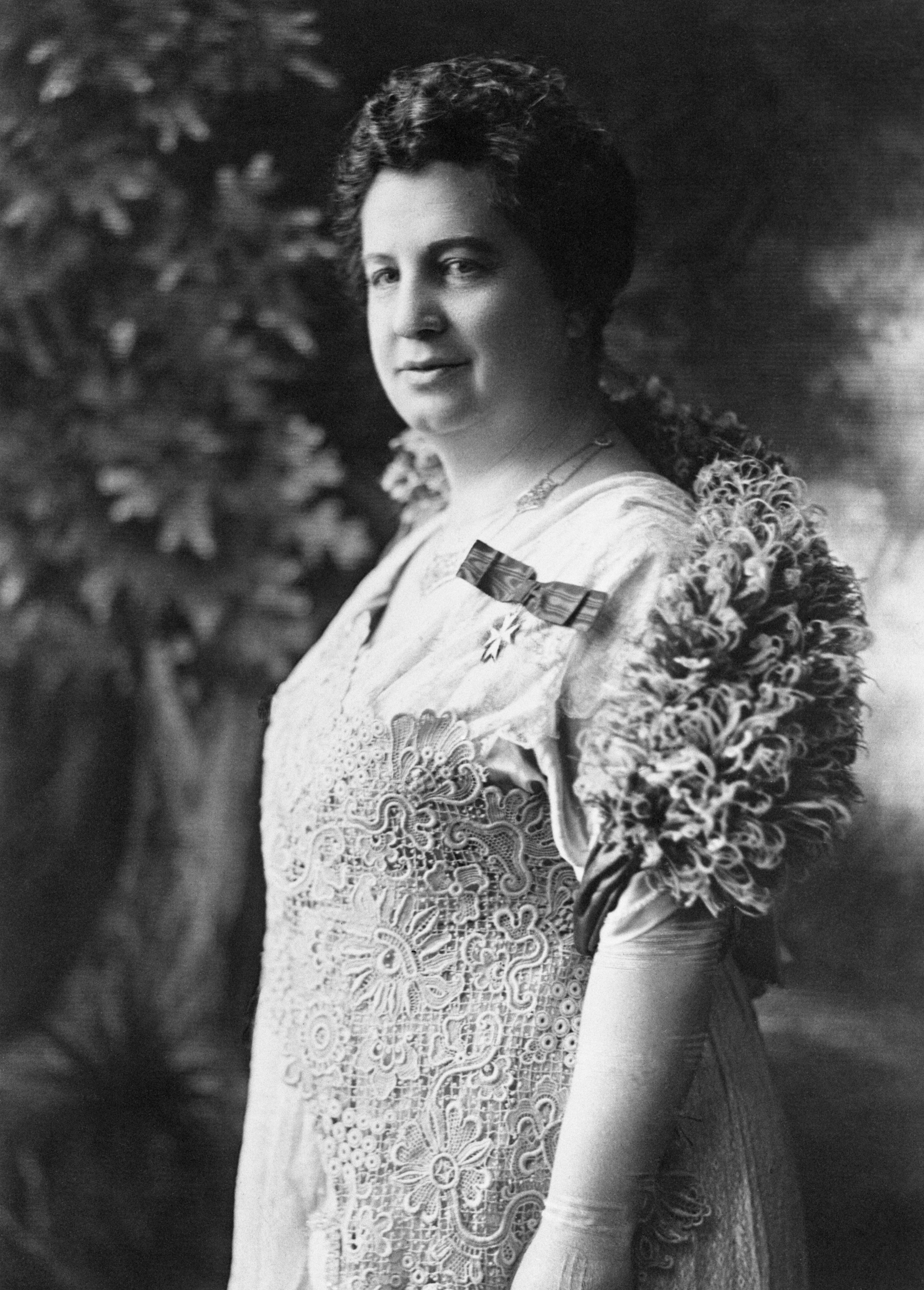
- Born: Emily Gowan Ferguson; 14 March 1868; Cookstown, Ontario, Canada
- Died: 27 October 1933 (aged 65); Edmonton, Alberta, Canada
- Occupations: Magistrate, activist, author
- Known for: Women's rights activist
- Spouse: Arthur Murphy (m. 1887)
- Children: 4

Emily Murphy (born Emily Gowan Ferguson; 14 March 1868 – 27 October 1933) was a Canadian women's rights activist and author. In June 1916, she became the first female magistrate in the British Empire. She is best known for her contributions to Canadian feminism, specifically to the question of whether women were "qualified persons" to serve in the Senate under Canadian law.

Murphy is known as one of "The Famous Five" (also called "The Valiant Five")—a group of Canadian women's rights activists that also included Henrietta Muir Edwards, Nellie McClung, Louise McKinney and Irene Parlby. In 1927, the women launched the "Persons Case," contending that women could be "qualified persons" eligible to sit in the Senate. The Supreme Court of Canada ruled that they were not. However, upon appeal to the Judicial Committee of the British Privy Council, the court of last resort for Canada at that time, the women won their case.

However, there has been some criticism of her later work, mainly for her role in the Sexual Sterilization Act of Alberta and her allegations that a ring of immigrants from other countries, particularly China, would corrupt the white race by getting Canadians hooked on drugs. In her book The Black Candle, she wrote: "It is hardly credible that the average Chinese peddler has any definite idea in his mind of bringing about the downfall of the white race, his swaying motive being probably that of greed, but in the hands of his superiors, he may become a powerful instrument to that end."

== Early life ==
Emily Murphy was born in Cookstown, Ontario, the third child of Isaac Ferguson and Emily Gowan. Isaac Ferguson was a successful businessman and property owner. As a child, Murphy frequently joined her two older brothers Thomas and Gowan in their adventures; their father encouraged this behaviour and often had his sons and daughters share responsibilities equally. Her brother William Nassau Ferguson became a judge of the Court of Appeal for Ontario.

Murphy grew up under the influence of her maternal grandfather, Ogle R. Gowan, a politician who founded a local branch of the Orange Order in 1830, and two uncles, one a Supreme Court justice and the other a senator. Her brother also became a lawyer and another member of the Supreme Court. Another uncle was Thomas Roberts Ferguson, an MP, and she was related to James Robert Gowan, who was a lawyer, judge, and senator.

Murphy benefited from parents who supported their daughter's receiving a formal academic education. She attended Bishop Strachan School, an exclusive Anglican private school for girls in Toronto where, through a friend, she met her future husband Arthur Murphy, who was 11 years her senior.

In 1887, they married, and subsequently had four daughters: Kathleen (born 1888), Evelyn, Madeleine (born 1892), and Doris (born 1896). Madeleine died in 1893 after being born prematurely, and Doris died in 1902. After Doris's death, the family decided to try a new setting and moved west to Swan River, Manitoba, in 1903 and then to Edmonton, Alberta, in 1907.

== Career ==
=== Dower Act ===
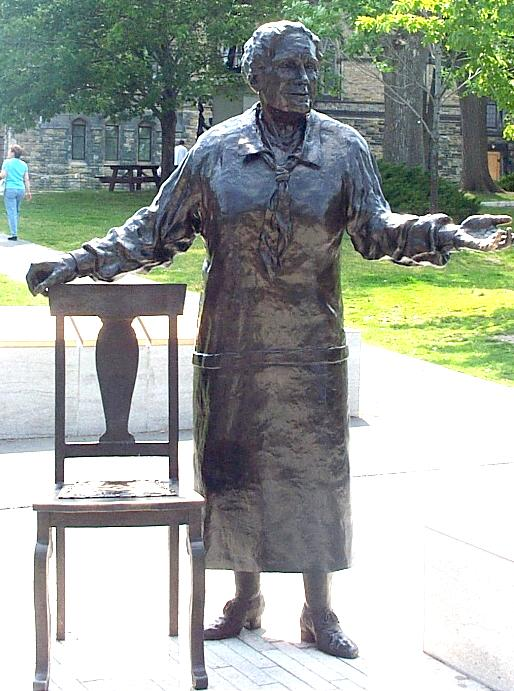
Statue of Emily Murphy in the monument to The Famous Five, Parliament Hill, Ottawa

While Arthur was working as an Anglican priest, Murphy explored her new surroundings and became increasingly aware of the poverty that existed.

At the age of 40, when her children became independent and began their separate lives, Murphy began to actively organize women's groups where the isolated housewives could meet and discuss ideas and plan group projects. In addition to these organizations, Murphy began to speak openly and frankly about the disadvantaged and the poor living conditions that surrounded their society.

Her strong interest in the rights and protection of women and children intensified when she was made aware of an unjust experience of an Albertan woman whose husband sold the family farm; the husband then abandoned his wife and children who were left homeless and penniless. At that time, property laws did not leave the wife with any legal recourse.

This case motivated Murphy to create a campaign that assured the property rights of married women. With the support of many rural women, Murphy began to pressure the Alberta government to allow women to retain the rights of their land. Beginning in 1910, Murphy successfully persuaded the Alberta legislature to pass the Dower Act, which was passed in 1917 and allowed a woman legal rights to one-third of her husband's property, even with no formal will. Murphy's reputation as a women's rights activist was established by this first political victory.

=== Appointment as female magistrate ===
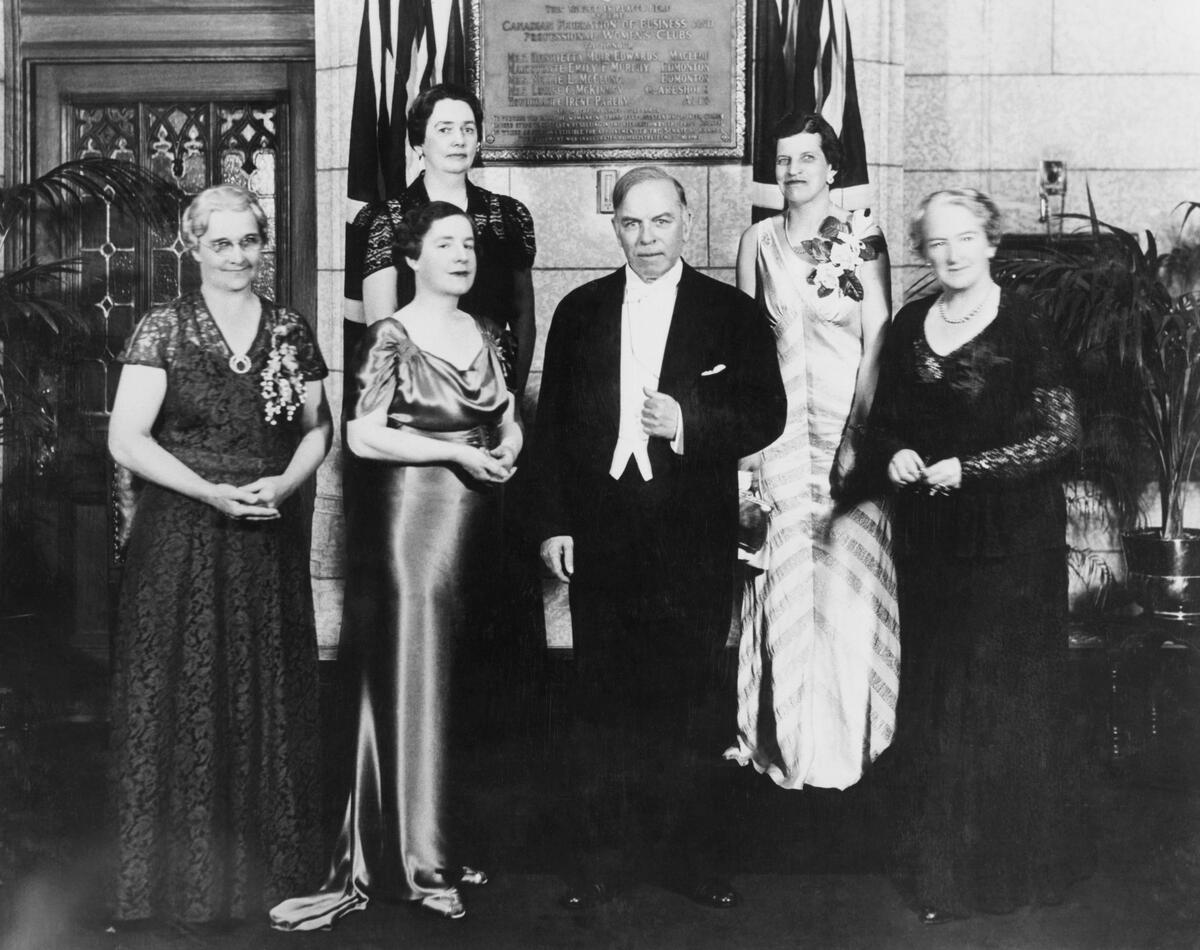
William Lyon Mackenzie King unveils a plaque commemorating the five Alberta women whose efforts resulted in the Persons Case. [Front, L-R]: Mrs. Muir Edwards, daughter-in-law of Henrietta Muir Edwards; Mrs. J.C. Kenwood, daughter of Judge Emily Murphy; Hon. W.L. Mackenzie King; Mrs. Nellie McClung. [Rear, L-R]: Senators Iva Campbell Fallis, Cairine Wilson (Ottawa).

Murphy's success in the fight for the Dower Act, along with her work through the Local Council of Women and her increasing awareness of women's rights, influenced her request for a female magistrate in the women's court.

In 1916, Murphy, along with a group of women, attempted to observe a trial for women who were labelled prostitutes and were arrested for "questionable" circumstances. The women were asked to leave the courtroom on the claims that the statement was not "fit for mixed company". This outcome was unacceptable to Murphy and she protested to the provincial Attorney General. "If the evidence is not fit company," she argued, "then the government must set up a special court presided over by women, to try other women".

Murphy's request was approved and she became the first woman police magistrate in the British Empire.

However, her appointment as a judge became the cause for her greatest adversity concerning women within the law. In her first case in Alberta on 1 July 1916, she found the prisoner guilty. The prisoner's lawyer called into question her right to pass a sentence since she was not legally a person. The Provincial Supreme Court denied the appeal.

=== Persons case ===
In 1917, she headed the battle to have women declared as "persons" in Canada, and, consequently, qualified to serve in the Senate. With the achievement of female suffrage achieved (or about to be) at least in English Canada, the legal obstacle preventing the appointment of women to the Senate was the last area in which women were not legal equals to men in Canadian political affairs. Edmonton lawyer, Eardley Jackson, challenged her position as judge because women were not considered "persons" under the British North America Act 1867. This understanding was based on a British common law ruling of 1876, which stated, "women were eligible for pains and penalties, but not rights and privileges." His appeal was rejected out of hand.

In 1919, Murphy presided over the inaugural conference of the Federated Women's Institutes of Canada, which passed a resolution calling for a female senator to be appointed. The National Council of Women and the Montreal Women's Club also supported the resolution, selecting Murphy as their preferred candidate.

Murphy began to work on a plan to ask for clarification of how women were regarded in the British North America Act 1867, and how they were to become Senators. She enlisted the help of four other Albertan women and on 27 August 1927 she and human rights activist and ex-MLA Nellie McClung, ex-MLA Louise McKinney, women's rights campaigner and author Henrietta Edwards, and sitting Alberta cabinet minister and MLA Irene Parlby signed the petition to the federal Cabinet, asking that the federal government refer the issue to the Supreme Court of Canada.

The women's petition set out two questions, but the federal government re-framed it as one question, asking the Supreme Court: "Does the word 'person' in Section 24 of the British North America Act include female persons?"

The campaign became known as The Persons Case and reached the Supreme Court of Canada in March 1928. The court held that women were not qualified to sit in the Senate. The five women then appealed to the Judicial Committee of the Privy Council in Britain. On 18 October 1929, in a decision called Edwards v. Canada (Attorney General), the Privy Council declared that 'persons' in Section 24 of the British North American Act 1867 should be interpreted to include both males and females; therefore, women were eligible to serve in the Senate.

Despite the ruling, Murphy never did serve in the Senate. After the ruling, the first seat to open up in the Senate was in Quebec - Murphy lived in Alberta. As well, the Prime Minister at the time, William Lyon Mackenzie King, was a Liberal, and Murphy was a partisan Conservative. She was passed over in favour of philanthropist Cairine Wilson in 1930.

After the Conservatives under R. B. Bennett won the 1930 federal election, Murphy was denied a chance to sit in the Senate again in 1931, because the vacancy had been caused by the death of a Catholic senator, and Murphy was a Protestant. (Meat-packer Robert Burns got the seat.) Murphy died in 1933 without fulfilling her dream of sitting in Canada's upper chamber.

The five appellants in the Person's Case were known as the Famous Five (or the Valiant Five) and were considered leaders in education for social reform and women's rights. They challenged convention and established an important precedent in Canadian history. In Canada's Senate Chamber, the five women are honoured with a plaque that reads, "To further the cause of womankind these five outstanding pioneer women caused steps to be taken resulting in the recognition by the Privy Council of women as persons eligible for appointment to the Senate of Canada." Murphy, along with the rest of the Famous Five, was featured on the back of one of the Canadian 50-dollar bills issued in 2004 as part of the Canadian Journey Series.

In October 2009, the Senate voted to name Murphy and the rest of the Five Canada's first "honorary senators".

== Views ==
=== Drugs and race ===
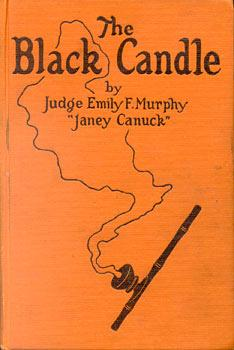
The cover of Murphy's 1922 book The Black Candle

Although Murphy's views on race changed over the course of her life, the perspective contained in her book The Black Candle is considered the most consequential because it played a role in creating a widespread "war on drugs mentality" leading to legislation that "defined addiction as a law enforcement problem". A series of articles in Maclean's magazine under her pen name, "Janey Canuck", forms the basis of The Black Candle. Using extensive anecdotes and "expert" opinion, The Black Candle depicts an alarming picture of drug abuse in Canada, detailing Murphy's understanding of the use and effects of opium, cocaine, and pharmaceuticals, as well as a "new menace", "marijuana". Murphy's concern with drugs began when she started coming into "disproportionate contact with Chinese people" in her courtroom because they were over-represented in the criminal justice system. In addition to professional expertise and her own observations, Murphy was also given a tour of opium dens in Vancouver's Chinatown by local police detectives. Vancouver at the time was in the midst of a moral panic over drugs that was part of the anti-Asian campaign that precipitated the Chinese Immigration Act of 1923.

Canadian drug historian Catherine Carstairs has argued that there is little documentary evidence on which to determine how early Canadian drug policy was formed. Although Murphy's anti-drug screeds were widely read and helped spread the drug panic across Canada, she was not respected by the Division of Narcotic Control because of the creative liberties she took in presenting research they had assisted her with. According to Carstairs, "There were insinuations in the records that the bureaucrats at the division of narcotic control did not think highly of Emily Murphy and did not pay attention to what she was writing about. They didn't consider her a particularly accurate or valuable source."

Carstairs also states that while Murphy was not the primary cause of the drug panic in Vancouver, but that nevertheless "her articles did mark a turning point and her book ... brought the Vancouver drug panic to a larger Canadian audience".

Race permeates The Black Candle, and is intricately entwined with the drug trade and addiction in Murphy's analysis. Yet she is ambiguous in her treatment of non-whites. In one passage, for example, she chastises whites who use the Chinese as "scapegoats", while elsewhere, she refers to the Chinese man as a "visitor" in this country, and that "it might be wise to put him out" if it turns out that this visitor carries "poisoned lollipops in his pocket and feeds them to our children". Drug addiction, however, not the Chinese immigrant, is "a scourge so dreadful in its effects that it threatens the very foundations of civilization", and which laws, therefore, need to target for eradication. Drugs victimize everyone, and members of all races perpetuate the drug trade, according to Murphy. At the same time, she does not depart from the dominant view of middle class whites at the time that "races" were discrete, biologically determined categories, naturally ranked in a hierarchy. In this scheme, the white race was facing degradation through miscegenation, while the more prolific "black and yellow races may yet obtain the ascendancy" and thus threatened to "wrest the leadership of the world from the British".

Murphy's distaste for non-whites is reflected in scholarly debates, but what is not controversial is that The Black Candle was written "for the express purpose of arousing public demands for stricter drug legislation" and that in this she was to some degree successful. This motivation may have influenced her racial analysis by playing to the popular prejudices of her white audiences. On the other hand, she may have deliberately tried to distance herself from those prejudices, especially the ones propagated by the more vulgar and excitable Asian exclusionists in British Columbia to maximize her credibility and sway her more moderate readers.

=== Eugenics movement ===
During the early twentieth century, scientific knowledge emerged at the forefront of social importance. Advances in science and technology were thought to hold answers to current and future social problems.

Murphy was among those who thought that societal problems like alcoholism, drug abuse and crime resulted from mental deficiencies. In a 1932 article titled "Overpopulation and Birth Control", she states: "over-population [is a] basic problem of all ... none of our troubles can even be allayed until this is remedied". As the politics behind the Second World War continued to develop, Murphy, who was a pacifist, theorized that the only reason for war was that nation needed to fight for land to accommodate their growing populations. She argued that people would not need as much land if there was population control. Without the constant need for more land, the war would cease to exist.

Her solution to these social issues was eugenics. Murphy supported selective breeding and the compulsory sterilization of those individuals who were considered mentally deficient. She believed that the mentally and socially inferior reproduced more than the "human thoroughbreds" and appealed to the Alberta Legislative Assembly for forced sterilization. In a petition, she wrote that mentally defective children were "a menace to society and an enormous cost to the state ... science is proving that mental defectiveness is a transmittable hereditary condition". She wrote to the UFA government's Minister of Agriculture and Health, George Hoadley that two female "feeble-minded" mental patients had already bred several offspring. She called it "a neglect amounting to a crime to permit these two women to go on bearing children".

The UFA government brought in a eugenics law in 1928, requiring parents' or guardians' approval of the operation. Later, after Murphy's death, William Aberhart's Social Credit government amended the law to allow forced sterilization.

Due in part to Murphy's heavy advocacy of compulsory sterilization, thousands of Albertan men and women were sterilized without their knowledge or consent under the Sexual Sterilization Act before its repeal in 1972.

== Legacy ==
Her legacy is disputed, with her important contributions to feminism being weighed against her racist and nativist views and her advocation of eugenics. In addition to being against immigration, she was a strong supporter of Alberta's legislation for the Sexual Sterilization of the Insane at a time when compulsory sterilization was practised in some North American jurisdictions.

Recent memorializing of the Famous Five, such as the illustration on the back of the fifty-dollar bill, has been used as the occasion for re-evaluating Murphy's legacy. Marijuana decriminalization activists especially have criticized Murphy as part of the movement to discredit marijuana prohibition. It has been speculated that today's drug laws are built on the racist foundations laid by Murphy and that the drug war has harmed more women than the Persons Case has benefited. Conversely, Murphy's defenders note that she was writing at a time when white racism was typical, not exceptional and that Murphy's views were more progressive than many of her peers.

Emily Murphy's house in Edmonton, Alberta (at 11011 - 88th Avenue) is on the Canadian Register of Historic People and Places. She lived in this home from 1919 until she died in 1933. It is now located on the campus of the University of Alberta and houses the Student Legal Services.

In 1958, she was recognized as a Person of National Historic Significance by the government of Canada. A plaque commemorating this is installed at Emily Murphy Park on Emily Murphy Park Road in Edmonton. The "National Persons" case was recognized in 1997 as a National Historic Event with a plaque at the same place.
