= Alberta Ladies' College of Red Deer =

Alberta Ladies' College of Red Deer was a training and boarding school for girls and young women founded in 1910 and originally located in Red Deer, Alberta, Canada. Within a few years of its founding, the college temporarily relocated to Assiniboia Hall on the campus of the University of Alberta and divested itself of its building and assets in Red Deer. In 1921, the college petitioned the government to amend the act that had established it to change the name to Westminster Ladies' College.

== Early years ==
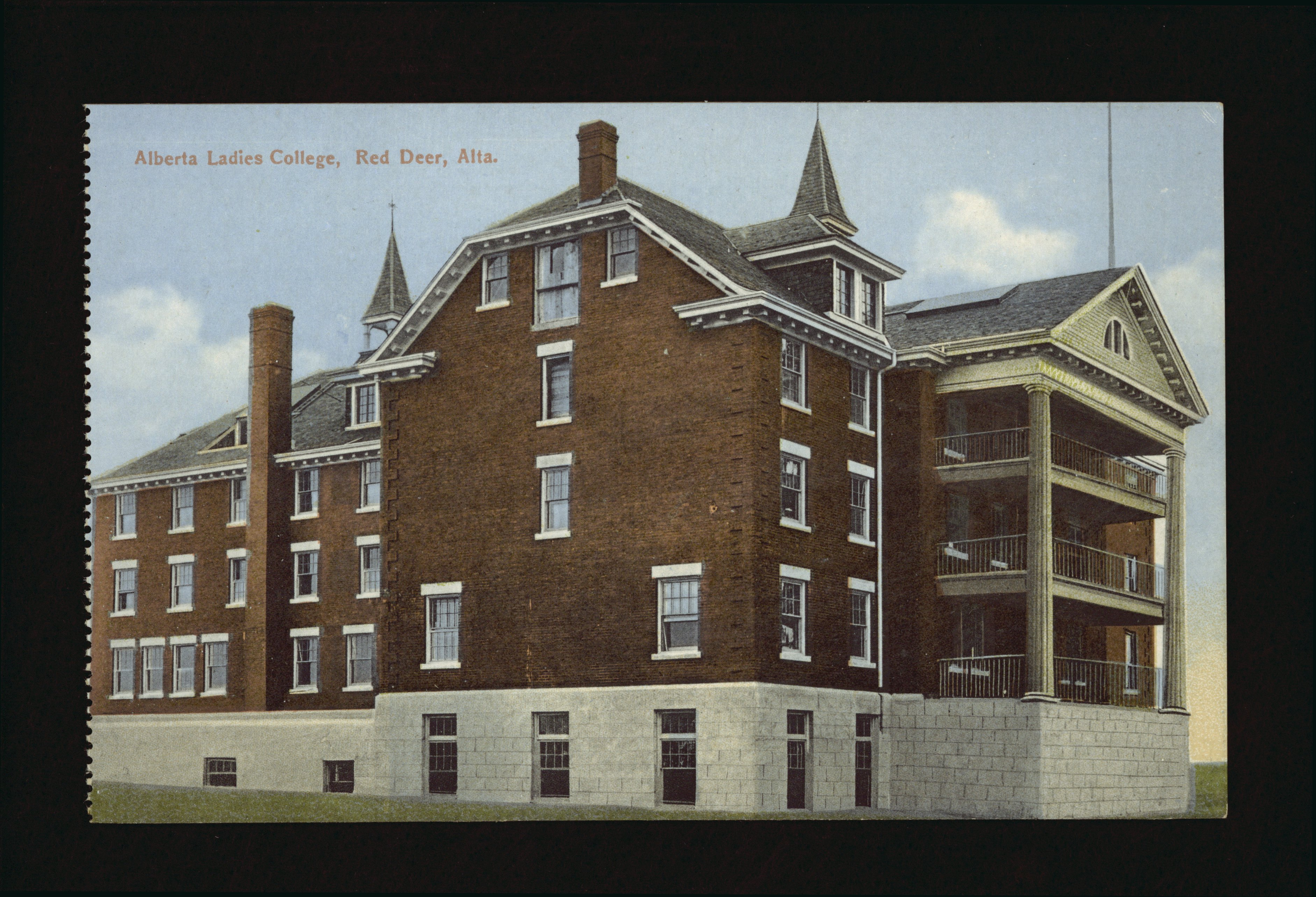
Postcard of Alberta Ladies' College in Red Deer, Alberta. 1912. University of Alberta Library Historical Postcard Collection.

As early as 1907 discussions around the establishment of a ladies college in Alberta were well underway, with Rev. J.C. Herdman of Calgary a key advocate. Several locations seemed to be in the running, at least at the start: Edmonton, Medicine Hat, Lethbridge, and later Red Deer and several others.

In July 1910 a meeting of the committee of the Presbyterian Church of Alberta was held in Red Deer and selected Red Deer as the location of the future college. By August of that year, they had secured the services of Rev. N.D. Keith of Ontario to head the college, and by fall of that year fundraising efforts had been started and nearly $5,000 raised Keith and others traveled Alberta soliciting support and donations for the school. At a stop in Claresholm in 1911, the college was noted as offering the “full public school and collegiate courses”, including household science, music, art, typing, and stenography.

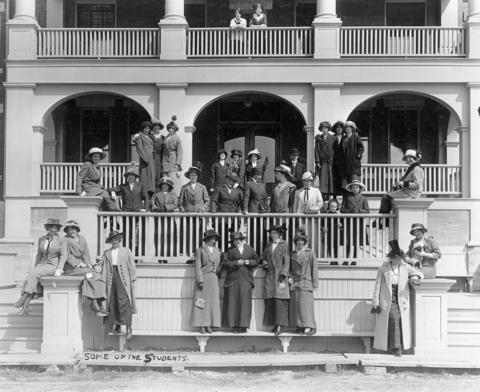
The first class of girls and their instructors at the Alberta Ladies College. 1913. Red Deer and District Archives.

Construction of the college building began in 1911 and was completed in 1913. The first term of instruction was in September 1912 even though the building was not yet complete. During that period, classes were held in a local private home, and the students housed in local residences. As soon as construction was complete in early 1913, students and instructors moved into the new space, with the official opening celebration held on April 1. That same year (1913), the college was formally enacted through legislation.

The closing ceremonies for that first year were held on June 18 and 19, 1913, with a dramatic production, demonstrations of physical activities and cookery skills, as well as the usual speeches and awarding of honors.

A report of the concluding ceremonies of the second year, held in June 1914, described the growth and popularity of the college and spoke of its promise for the future.

Despite apparent success, by 1916 the college was running into financial difficulties. In May 1916, the Presbyterian Synod of Alberta passed a resolution allowing the college to sell the building and land to the Alberta government. The sale was completed that same month. The college's final closing ceremonies in Red Deer were held on June 16, 1916.

== Move to Edmonton ==
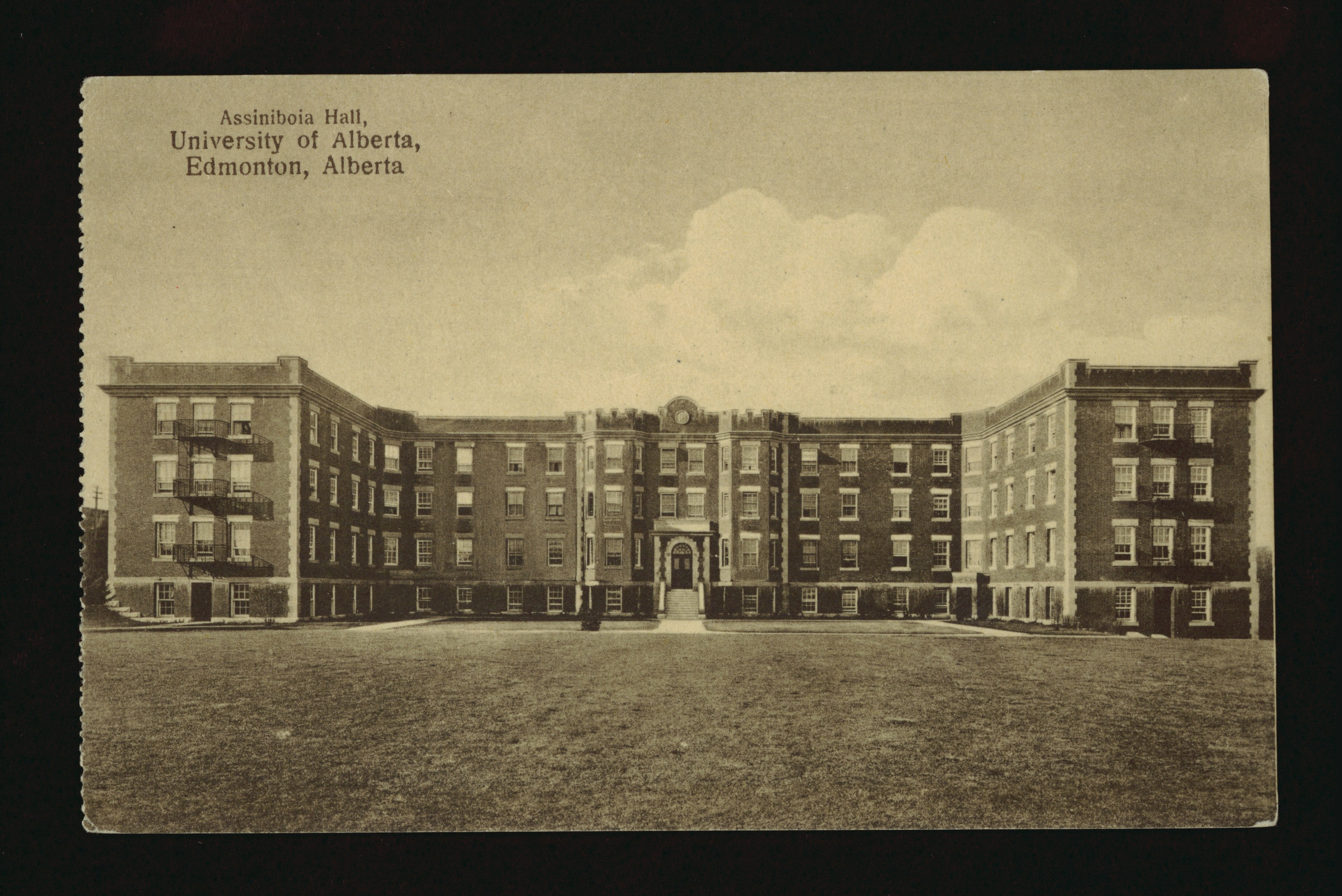
Assiniboia Hall, University of Alberta, Edmonton, Alberta

In July 1916 the board of the college confirmed the decision to move to Edmonton. An advertisement in the August 16, 1916 edition of the Grain Growers Guide stated that the college was “now located in Assiniboia Hall, University Building, Edmonton, Alberta”. An article in a September 1916 issue of the Edmonton Bulletin noted that the college moved “lock, stock and barrel” from Red Deer to Edmonton in one week, and was looking forward to its new location and close relationship with the University of Alberta. On October 31, the college staff and students held a reception in their new home for the university and Edmonton community to get a "glimpse into the daily life of Red Deer Ladies' College".

The report of the mayor, given at the annual meeting of the rate-payers of the City of Red Deer on 1 December 1916, noted that the city had offered the college suitable land on which to build a new building, but that the offer was turned down. The move to Edmonton was initially meant to be one year while a determination of the final and permanent home for the college was considered, with "offers and proposals from cities and towns within the province" welcomed.

Lilias Milne, an alumna of the college, reminisced in a 1985 issue of New Trail (the University of Alberta alumni magazine) about her days at the college in Assiniboia Hall. “The north wing was residence for staff and students. The ground floor had an infirmary and music practice rooms, [while] the second floor had sitting rooms for staff and students. The centre of the building held suites occupied by university professors. The dining room was also on the first floor, [while] a trunk storage room and a small laundry were on the ground floor. The second floor had classrooms, the third floor was the commercial department, [and] Convocation Hall was the scene of our gym displays and prize-giving”. University of Alberta alumnus R.K. Gordon reminisced about this time: "When the 196th [Battalion] moved out of Assiniboia, the Red Deer Ladies' College moved in. They were no quieter than the army; they filled the air with the sound of piano-practising".

The college was impacted by the 1918–1919 flu epidemic, with the students and staff "masked and quarantined -- no contact with the outside world". But "through careful supervision and preventive measures, [it] practically escaped the first severe outbreak", and was "able to continue its classes throughout the [fall 1918] session without interruption". Although several staff and students did fall ill in 1919, there were no fatalities.

The college continued its mission from its Assiniboia Hall location through the 1917–1918 and 1918–1919 terms. The benefits of being located on the university campus were clearly laid out for potential students and their families: "Besides the benefit of coming into an educational atmosphere, our students will have the privilege of attending University lectures and other functions".

== New location, new name ==
At the May 1, 1919 meeting of the Presbyterian Synod, Rev. Keith indicated that the college was once again on the move, as the University of Alberta would need Assiniboia Hall back for the fall term in expectation of high enrollment of soldiers returning from the First World War. He noted that the old Strathcona Hotel in Edmonton had been leased for five years, and that some minor renovations were underway in preparation for the fall term. He also noted that the college was looking for a new name and welcomed suggestions through July of that year. It was also noted that a new site for the college had been secured, but that construction would not commence until necessary funds had been raised.

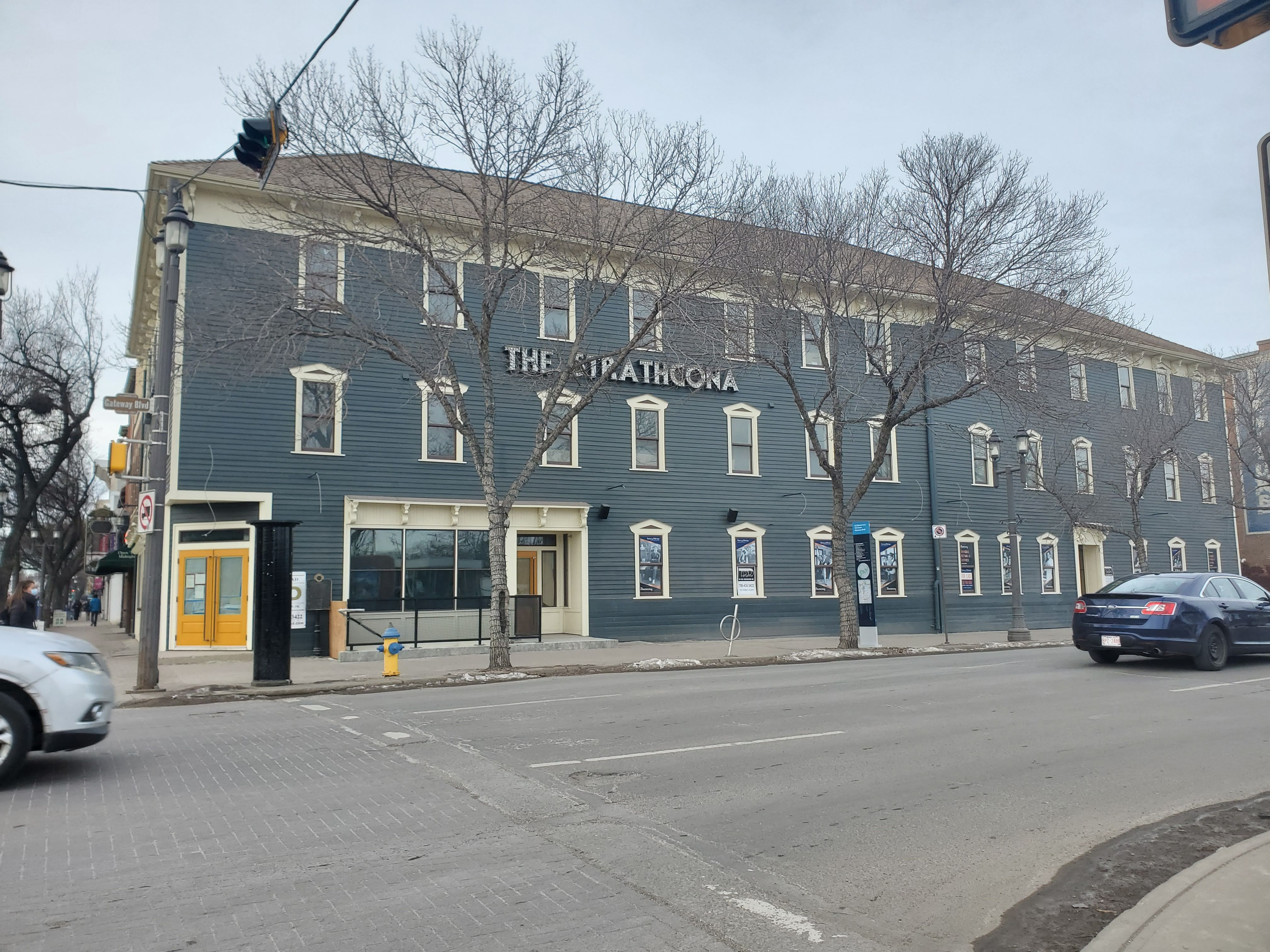
Old Strathcona Hotel 2021

By August, 1919 the college had announced its new name – Westminster Ladies' College – and was advertising its fall term in its new location in the old Strathcona Hotel on Whyte Avenue. The 1920 closing ceremonies lauded the success of the term, including the benefits of their new location, and looked forward to a future move into a dedicated building on newly purchased land. They thanked The university for allowing them the continued use of Convocation Hall, and the "C.PR., Know Church, and the South Side rink" for the basketball, skating, and tennis facilities.

Throughout 1920 and 1921, Rev. Keith and others with the college continued to focus on the future and raise awareness and funds for building and other infrastructure. These drives emphasized the value of the college and noted its recognition as a “force for good”.

The 1921 commencement was held on May 20. In July of that year, the college asked the city for tax relief on the property it had purchased for its future building, which was granted. In October, 1921 the college announced “Brookfield Butter Week”, a chance for residents of Edmonton to support the college through the purchase of Brookfield Creamery Butter at one of 300 participating Edmonton retailers. A large advertisement for the fundraising campaign was included in the 1921 University of Alberta yearbook Evergreen and Gold.

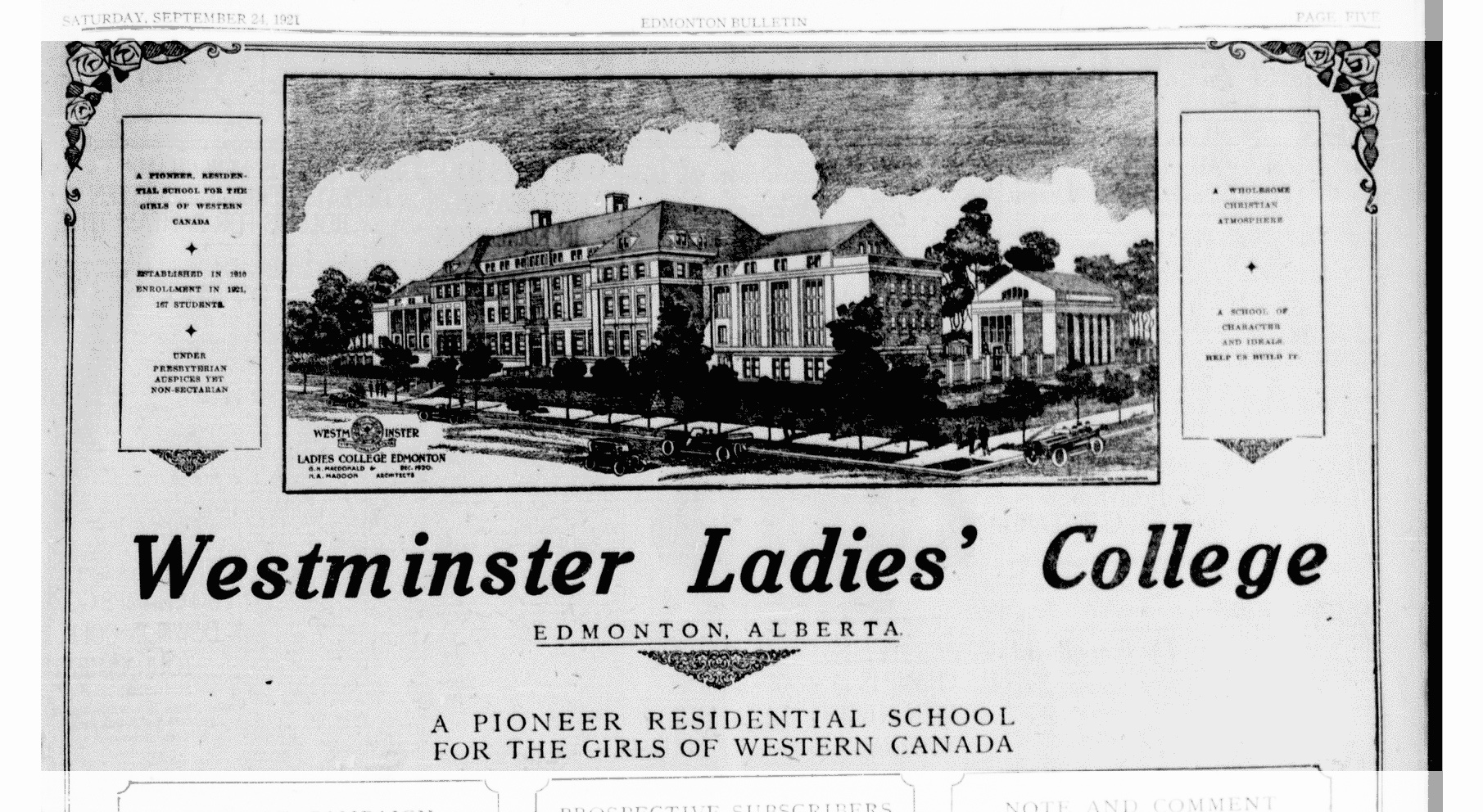
Architectural rendering of Westminster Ladies' College, Edmonton Alberta

These fundraising campaigns focused on money for college buildings, but also for an endowment to secure the college's future and to provide support for students in need. Goals ranged from $225,000 to $500,000. A piece in the Edmonton Bulletin in April, 1921 included plans for the college grounds as well as an architectural concept for the main campus building.

These were perhaps signs of worsening financial struggles. On October 27, 1921, Rev. Keith resigned as principal, and the Alberta Presbyterian Synod named a commission “to deal with the situation with respect to the college, which may have to be closed”. An Edmonton Bulletin notice of December 30, 1921, indicated that in January 1922, the college would open but only as a residence for girls studying elsewhere, with music being the only department that might remain.

== Final years ==
The college continued in this way (offering housing and some instruction such as music, art, and physical education) as the Westminster Residence for Girls for several years. This was done until 1924, and perhaps until the building was sold back to private investors in 1928.

== Mission ==
Although the college was under the control of the Presbyterian Synod of Alberta, the teaching was non-sectarian. As the only institution of its kind on the prairies at the time, it drew students of numerous denominations and from many communities, large and small. According to Rev. Keith, “thoroughness in education, the character of its discipline, and Christian education” were the three pillars `of the college. “It is the aim of the college to give the students a substantial and well-ordered education such as will fit them for the duties and responsibilities of life and enable them to take their places in the domestic, social, intellectual and religious life of their communities”.

== Programs of study ==
The college offered the same curriculum as the junior and senior courses of the public and high schools in the province at the time, which included subjects such as English, history, mathematics, etc. In addition, it offered: various arts courses, including music (voice, piano, violin, theory, organ), art (china painting, oil painting, drawing, water colours), drama and elocution, leather work and wood carving, basketry, and interpretative reading; household sciences, including cooking, fancy and plain sewing, and baking; nursing and sanitation; scripture; gymnasium (folk dancing, Swedish exercises, drill, various sports); and commercial (typewriting, stenography, shorthand, spelling, penmanship, bookkeeping, rapid calculation, office system).

== Principals ==
The college had numerous principals, many of them given the title 'lady principal', over the years. They were: Mrs. Jean Muldrew (1912–1917), Miss M.G. Millar (1917–1918), Miss Sara M. McBride (1918–1919), Miss Ada A. Wilkie (1920–1922), Rev. William Simons (1922), Rev. M.H. Wilson.
