= Alberta Eugenics Board =

Canadian government agency

The Alberta Eugenics Board was an agency created by the Alberta government in 1928 that attempted to impose sterilization on a disabled subset of its population, in accordance with the principles of eugenics. It remained active until 1972, when it was dissolved.

== Origin ==
In 1928, the Alberta government (Alberta, Canada) passed eugenics legislation that enabled the involuntary sterilization of individuals classified as mentally deficient (now known as persons with a developmental disability or mental disorder), with the consent of the patient or his/her guardian or next-of-kin. To implement the Sexual Sterilization Act, a four-member Alberta Eugenics Board was created to recommend individuals for sterilization.

The Act was amended in 1937, during the term of William Aberhart's Social Credit government, to allow sterilization without consent. In 1972, the Act was repealed and the Board dismantled. During its 43 years in operation, the Board approved nearly 5,000 cases and 2,832 sterilizations were performed. The actions of the Board came under public scrutiny in 1995 with Leilani Muir's successful lawsuit against the Alberta government for wrongful sterilization.

== Eugenics: Like begets like ==
Although Mendelian inheritance principles were well understood by geneticists in 1928, advocates of the eugenics movement held onto the unfounded premise that "like begets like". They believed that social degenerates would procreate and pass on their "undesirable" traits to their offspring. Although it was known at the time, for recessive disorders, like does not always beget like, and with dominant disorders, there is only a 50% risk of transmission to the child. The progeny of parents with mental deficiencies are not always born with an inherited disorder. Mental disorder phenotypes are influenced by environmental interactions, such as German measles, and are often independent of an individual's genome.

== Historical context ==
The province of Alberta was the first part of the British Empire to adopt a sterilization law, and was the only Canadian province that vigorously implemented it. Eugenics was widely discussed in the U.S. at the time and British Columbia and Alberta were influenced by American trends. During early debates regarding the sexual sterilization bill in Alberta, there were many references made to U.S. legislation. As Canada was being populated by immigrants, the eugenics movement was emerging and gaining the support of influential sponsors, such as J. S. Woodsworth, Robert Charles Wallace, and The Alberta Five prominent suffragists: Emily Murphy, Helen MacMurchy, Louise McKinney, Irene Parlby, Nellie McClung. In Alberta, eugenics supporters had seemingly positive intentions with the goal of bettering the gene pool and society at large. The burden put on hard-working farm mothers by mentally-disabled children with adult sex drives was a major impetus to UFA cabinet minister Irene Parlby.

In 1918, the Canadian National Committee on Mental Hygiene (CNCMH) was established by Dr. Clarence Hincks. The committee's aim was "to fight crime, prostitution, and unemployment" which it claimed was strongly tied to feeble-mindedness. One of the projects that the CNCMH and Hincks took on, along with Dr. C. K. Clarke, was conducting provincial surveys of mental institutions in 1919, and making subsequent recommendations to the provincial government. Visiting several institutions, the results of their survey, published in 1921, attributed social inefficiency and corruption to mental inadequacy, and recommended sterilization as a preventative measure. They claimed to have found "scientific proof" linking feeble-mindedness to social issues.

At the United Farmers of Alberta (UFA) party convention in 1922, in response to this survey, the Alberta government was called on to draft and implement legislation for the segregation of feeble-minded adults. The government was also asked to investigate the feasibility of implementing a sterilization program in Alberta. R.G. Reid, the Minister of Health, assured eugenics supporters that the provincial government was in favour of a sterilization program, and was only waiting for public opinion to catch up.

The United Farm Women of Alberta lobbied for sterilization laws, and members used their connections with the UFA government to get legislation passed. At a campaign in 1924, president Margaret Gunn proclaimed, "Democracy was never intended for degenerates". The rationale that eugenics supporters gave was that families with "defective" offspring were a financial burden on the province, especially in times of economic adversity.

On March 25, 1927, George Hoadley, Minister of Agriculture and Health in John E. Brownlee's UFA government, introduced a sexual sterilization bill. The bill faced enormous opposition, primarily from the Conservative and Liberal parties, and did not pass the second reading. Hoadley promised to reintroduce it the following year and, on February 23, 1928, the bill was passed. On March 21, 1928, the lieutenant governor gave royal assent to the Sexual Sterilization Act. Brought in by the UFA, the Act remained in place under the following Social Credit governments of William Aberhart and Ernest Manning, which amended the Act in 1937 to allow sterilization without consent, and the first year of the Progressive Conservative government. After Peter Lougheed's Progressive Conservative government took power, the Alberta Eugenics Board was finally disbanded and the Sexual Sterilization Act repealed in 1972.

== Board structure ==
The Alberta Eugenics Board was created in order to administer the province's eugenics program. The Sexual Sterilization Act required that a four-person Board determine, on a case-by-case basis, whether sterilization was appropriate for a particular individual. The Act gave the Board power to review cases of patients living in or discharged from mental institutions and order their sterilization, if deemed necessary. A unanimous decision required, as was consent from the patient, parent, or guardian and was essential for the surgical procedures to proceed. The Act put in place specific requirements for its board members: two members were required to be medical practitioners, nominated by the Senate of the University of Alberta and the Council of the College of Physicians. The other two non-medical members were appointed by the Lieutenant Governor in Council, and had esteemed reputations.

=== The original four members ===
The first members appointed to the Alberta Eugenics Board were:

- Dr. E. Pope, Edmonton
- Dr. E.G. Mason, Calgary
- Dr. J.M. MacEachran, Edmonton
- Mrs. Jean H. Field, Kinuso.

Dr. MacEachran, a philosopher and professor at the University of Alberta, was appointed chair, and he served continuously in this position for nearly 40 years, resigning in 1965. He was succeeded by Dr. R.K. Thompson, a medical doctor who chaired the Board until the Sexual Sterilization Act was repealed in 1972. Over the Board's 43-year duration, there were only 21 board members. Between 1929 and 1972, all four members were present for approximately 97% of the 398 meetings that were held.

== Board meetings and procedures ==
The first meeting of the Alberta Eugenics Board took place in January 1929. At the second meeting, in March 1929, the Board established a protocol to be followed during its quarterly meetings. At meetings the superintendents of Alberta mental institutions presented cases to the Board, along with prepared presentation summaries for each individual considered for sterilization. These summaries documented: family history, sexual history, medical history and diagnosis, personality, psychosocial development, education, results of IQ testing, criminal record, ethnicity, religion, age, and other information that could be used to inform the Board's decision. Presenting mental institutions in Alberta included: the Alberta Hospital in Ponoka, the Provincial Training School (later known as Alberta School Hospital/Deerhome, and Michener Center) in Red Deer, and the Alberta Hospital in Oliver.

Patients were then interviewed by the Board and recommendations were made for sterilization. If they could not attend, members sometimes saw the patient in their institutional ward. Consent was initially required for all operational procedures, either from the patients, their parent or guardian. A competent surgeon was appointed to the case; however the Act stated they were not liable to any civil action. Various types of operations were performed: vasectomies, salpingectomies (tubal ligation), orchidectomies (removal of the testes), oophorectomies (removal of the ovaries), and sometimes hysterectomies. Operations took place in approved hospitals designated by the Board. In addition to the appointed board members and presenters, it was not uncommon for other professionals, support staff, or visitors to attend patient interviews.

Typically, 4–15 people attended Board meetings, averaging 8.4 persons per meeting. On average, the Board spent approximately 13 minutes reviewing each case, and members discussed about 13 cases per meeting. The Board retained individual-level files for all of the cases considered. One of the Board's main concerns was tracking the number of people processed. In addition to the routine case reviews, members spent time during 63% of its meetings discussing general issues, signing forms, and reviewing correspondence.

== Amendments to the Sexual Sterilization Act ==
By 1937, 400 operations had been completed and amendments to the Act were made. The first amendment came shortly after the Social Credit government came into power in 1935. The new Minister of Health, Wallace Warren Cross, was dismayed that only hundreds of individuals had been sterilized when thousands could have been done but were not due to consent requirements. Following the change in legislation, if individuals were regarded as mental defectives, consent was no longer necessary for their sterilization. A month after this amendment a special Alberta Eugenics Board meeting was held in order to review past cases of individuals who were now eligible for sterilization.

Another part of the 1937 amendment increased the Board's power: sterilization procedures were approved if the Board deemed an individual "incapable of intelligent parenthood". The success of this amendment was celebrated in 1937 in an article published by two mental health professionals, R.R. MacLean and E.J. Kibblewhite, where they noted the increasing simplicity with which the Board could proceed with its business.

In 1942, an additional amendment widened the application of the Act to include more mental patients. Non-psychotic individuals with syphilis, epilepsy, and Huntington's Chorea were now encompassed by the Act; however, for reasons unknown, the Board maintained that consent was still required for these cases.

== Board actions ==
Between 1929 and 1972, 4,785 cases were presented to the Alberta Eugenics Board, and 99% of these cases were approved. Of all the approved cases, 60% were completed resulting in the sterilization of 2,832 Albertan children and adults in the Board's 43-year history. There was a high correlation between absence of consent requirement and subsequent sterilization: 89% of all presented and approved cases did not require consent for sterilization to occur, as opposed to 15% of cases where consent was necessary.

Beginning in the 1940s, women were more likely to be presented to the Board than men, even though they constituted less than 40% of all patients in the feeder institutions. On average, 64% of all women whose cases were presented to the Board were sterilized in comparison to 54% of men. Of the 2,832 sterilization procedures completed, 58% were performed on females. The over-representation of women may reflect gender role expectations, where these women were considered "incapable of intelligent parenting".

In addition to women, the Board targeted youth and young adults for sterilization. Although they made up less than 20% of the Albertan population at the time, they comprised 44% of all presented cases and 55% of all sterilization cases. Patients who were age 40 and older were notably under-represented, as the Board focused its efforts on individuals in the "child-bearing years" – those who were able and most likely to reproduce.

Over four decades, Indigenous people (i.e., First Nations, Métis, and Inuit) were the foremost targets of the Board's actions. Only representing 2–3% of Alberta's population, they comprised 6% of all presented sterilization cases. Of all aboriginal cases presented to the Board, 74% resulted in sterilization.

Regarding the feeder institutions, the Alberta Hospital in Ponoka was responsible for about 60% of all cases considered, followed by the Provincial Training School and Deerhome in Red Deer with 25%, and the Alberta Hospital in Oliver with 14%.

== Board controversy ==
The majority of Alberta Eugenics Board activities were conducted in secret, sheltered from public criticism and legislative scrutiny. This secrecy and lack of transparency, combined with the cooperation of the provincial government and feeder institutions, resulted in the Board pursuing illicit activities not encompassed by the Act. The fact that the Board approved 99% of all presented cases calls into question the validity and accountability of its procedures. Some cases were approved even when patients' IQ scores were above the criterion score established by the Board for sterilization. At times, surgeons performed operations without the Board's approval. Sterilization procedures were also ordered for individuals who were already infertile – most notably, a group of 15 boys with Down syndrome where testicular biopsy tissue was surgically removed for the purpose of medical research.

== Repeal ==
The Progressive Conservative party led by Peter Lougheed came to power in 1971 and, a year later, passed the Alberta Bill of Rights. Shortly after, the new provincial government revoked the Sexual Sterilization Act and folded the Alberta Eugenics Board, citing three reasons:

1. Primarily, the Act violated fundamental human rights.
2. It was based on medical and genetics theories which are now of questionable scientific validity.
3. It was full of legal ambiguities, most notably in the section exempting surgeons from civil liability.

In the mid-1990s, Leilani Muir, a victim of involuntary sterilization in 1959, sued the Alberta government for wrongful sterilization. The case went to full trial in 1995, Muir won the case in 1996, and she was awarded nearly C$1 million in damages and legal costs. Since Muir's precedent-setting trial, over 850 victims have filed lawsuits against the Alberta government; the majority of these have been settled out of court and C$142 million in damages have been awarded.

== See also ==
- Compulsory sterilization in Canada
