= Sexual Sterilization Act =

1928 law in Alberta, Canada

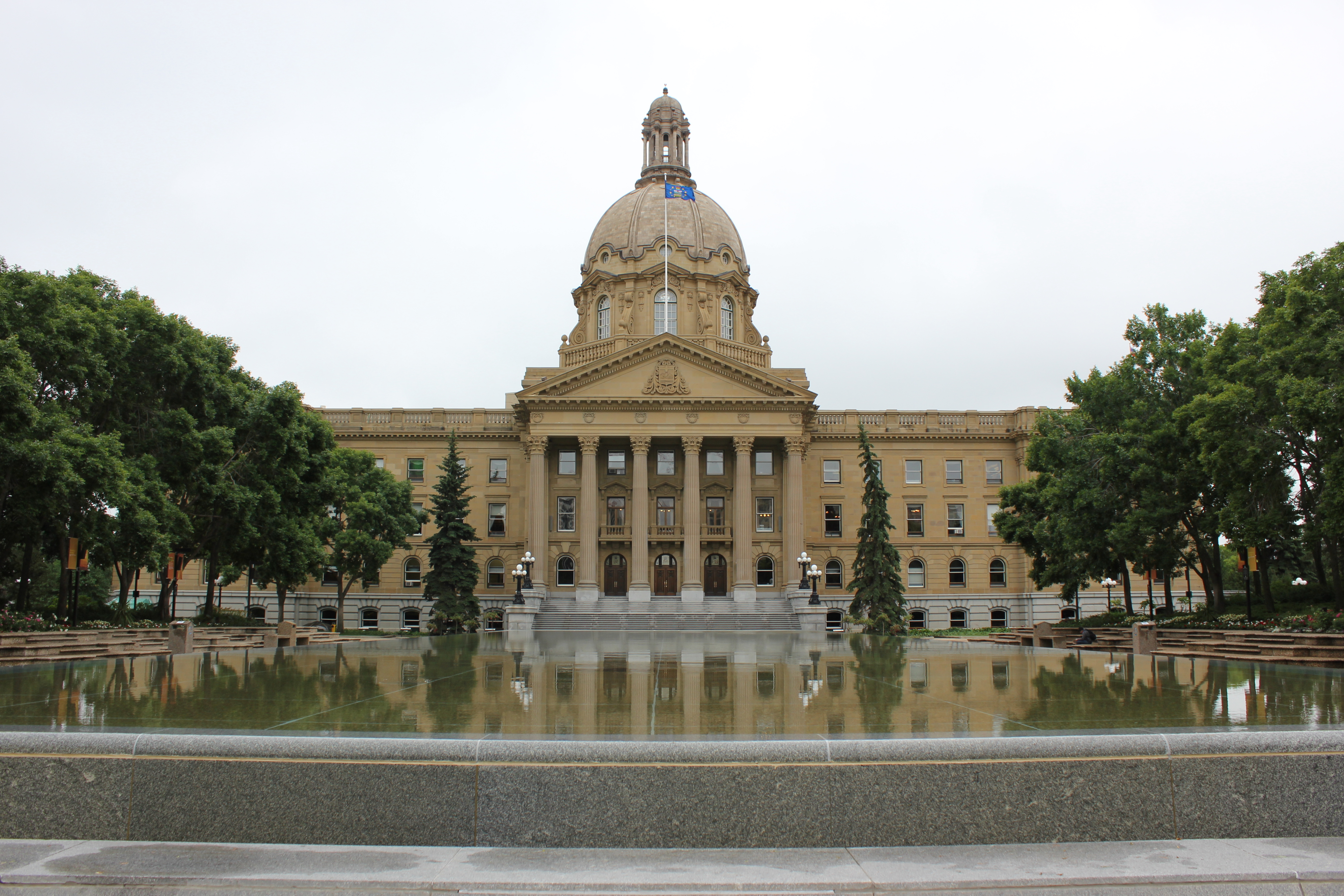

Legislative Assembly of Alberta
- Citation: The Sexual Sterilization Act, SA 1928, c 37
- Passed by: 6th Alberta Legislature
- Passed: March 21, 1928
- Royal assent: March 21, 1928
- Introduced by: George Hoadley, Minister of Health
- Status: Repealed

The Sexual Sterilization Act was a law enacted in 1928 by the Legislative Assembly of Alberta, Canada. Supported by influential social groups, the Act was aimed to redress social problems by preventing the transmission of personality traits deemed undesirable to offspring and therefore allowed for sterilization of mentally disabled people.

At that time, eugenicists argued that mental illness, mental retardation, epilepsy, alcoholism, pauperism, certain criminal behaviours, and social defects, such as prostitution and sexual perversion, were genetically determined and inherited. Further, it was widely believed that persons with these disorders had a higher reproduction rate than the normal population, leading to a gradual societal decline.

During the time the Sexual Sterilization Act was in effect, 4,800 cases were proposed for sterilization in the Province of Alberta, of which 99% received approval. Examination of sterilization records demonstrates that legislation did not apply equally to all members of society. Specifically, the Act was disproportionately applied to those in socially vulnerable positions, including females, children, unemployed persons, domestic servants, rural citizens, unmarried, institutionalized persons, Roman and Greek Catholics, and persons of Ukrainian, Native, and Métis ethnicity.

Controversial even at the time of its introduction, the Act was repealed in 1972.

== Enactment ==
The Sexual Sterilization Act was first introduced into the legislature on March 5, 1927, but due to a crowded session and unclear bill format, it was pulled from the schedule. On February 23, 1928, George Hoadley, Minister of Health, reintroduced the bill with a comment regarding the growing burden of taxpayers in caring for immigrants and mentally disabled persons.

Much controversy surrounded the bill and eventually, in March 1928, the People's League to Act was formed. The League, with membership numbers of several hundred, retained counsel and contested the constitutionality of the Sexual Sterilization Act. Despite their efforts, the Act was given Royal Assent on March 21, 1928.

For the purposes of the Act, the Alberta Eugenics Board was formed. The Board was to be composed of four members:

- Two medical practitioners nominated by the Senate of the University of Alberta and the Council of the College of Physicians
- Two persons other than medical practitioners, appointed by the Lieutenant Governor in Council.

Under the terms of the Act, mental hospital inmates could only be discharged with the approval of the medical superintendent, and it was within the superintendent's power to force examination by the Eugenics Board. If in unanimous agreement, the Board was empowered to appoint a physician and direct sterilization. Such operations were not to be performed unless consent was obtained from the inmate, if competent, or consent from a spouse, parent, guardian or Minister of Health if considered incompetent.

Further, the Act provided that no surgeon performing an operation could be held liable to any civil action by reason of the operation.

== Amendments ==
In 1937, an amendment to the Act was proposed by Dr. W.W. Cross, Social Credit Minister of Health, as the Act was considered too restrictive. It was accepted that sterilization was permitted for the benefit of the human race, not the individual, and as such consent was no longer deemed a requirement. At that time, Albertans, seriously affected by the Great Depression, believed sterilization would effect a much-needed saving in dollars.

The Act was amended as follows:

- A distinction was made between psychotic persons and mentally defective persons.
- The criterion for sterilization in both categories was no longer solely genetic. The risk of mental injury to the patient or progeny was now included as grounds for sterilization.
- Consent of the person to be sterilized, or of the spouse, parent, guardian or the Minister continued to be needed only in the case of psychotic persons.

In addition, the exemption from civil action was extended to include any individual taking part in the surgical operations as well as persons in charge of mental institutions who had caused an inmate to be examined by the Eugenics Board.

The Act underwent another amendment in 1942, this time to specifically broaden the category of mental patients who could be directed to undergo sterilization. Despite knowledge of Nazi eugenic atrocities, the Alberta Eugenics Board intended to increase the pace of sterilization.

Persons with neurosyphilis, epilepsies with psychosis, mental deterioration, and Huntington's disease could, with consent of the patient, be sterilized. An exception to consent was made for patients presenting with Huntington's chorea who were also psychotic.

== Repeal ==
It was not until 1969, under the direction of Peter Lougheed, Progressive Conservative and Leader of the Opposition, the Act was reviewed. Mr. Lougheed's party intended to introduce a provincial Bill of Rights and a review of existing legislation was directed in an effort to identify potentially conflicting legislation. Mr. Lougheed attacked the Act on legal and moral grounds and the Progressive Conservative party adopted repeal of the Act as part of their platform.

In 1972 David King, MLA Edmonton-Highlands, was successful in introducing a Bill to repeal the Sexual Sterilization Act.

== Background ==
=== Canadian National Committee for Mental Health ===
In 1918, psychiatrists C.K. Clarke and C. Hincks established the Canadian National Committee for Mental Hygiene (CNCMH). The CNCMH was a self-appointed body of experts available for consultation regarding mental health issues. The Committee claimed that institutionalization of mental degenerates was both expensive and ineffective and promoted the use of preventative measures. The group was active in working for the testing of students and construction of training schools for mental defectives. In addition, they advocated tougher inspection and restriction of immigrants.

=== Mental health survey ===
Perhaps the most influential resource for rationalizing sterilization in the Province of Alberta came in the form of a mental health survey. In 1919, Dr. Hincks, professor of Psychiatry at the University of Toronto and specialist on mental diseases, conducted a survey of the province. His goal was to formulate a treatment and training plan for the mentally deficient that would best serve society. The survey involved a review of facilities for the mentally abnormal.

The results were published in the 1921 report entitled Mental Hygiene Survey of the Province of Alberta. The report notes that those who suffer from a mental defect or mental disorder are rightly regarded as social liability and recommends careful screening of immigrants and the use of sexual sterilization to control the abnormal population.

Dr. Hincks's committee describes a causal link between mental abnormality and immorality (illegitimacy, criminality, prostitution, dependency). The suggestion that bad behaviour and sexual immorality were directly related to mental deficiency gave rise to concern by the public and politicians that these individuals posed a threat to society.

In addition, the committee assumed that mental abnormality could be detected early in life with various test instruments. In the course of their examination, they also reviewed student behaviour at the elementary level by administering intelligence quotient tests to children who had been described by their teachers as “troublesome, mischief-makers or general disturbers.” According to the committee, the tests revealed that such troublesome children were more prone to possess low I.Q. Further, the children were interviewed and a conclusion was reached that these same troublesome children also possessed less sound moral values. It wasn't until much later that the I.Q. tests would be recognized as culturally biased.

=== United Farmers of Alberta ===
The United Farmers of Alberta, an agricultural lobbying group, responded quickly to the survey and called on the government to draft legislation for life segregation or sterilization of the feebleminded. The weight of the survey's results, combined with the growing fear that new immigrants were inferior, had generated fears over the protection of land and jobs.

In 1923, under growing pressure from the United Farmers of Alberta, Minister of Health, Hon. R.G. Reid, proposed sterilization of mental defectives as a preferable alternative to aggregation in institutions, but concluded that public support would need to be developed.

The United Farm Women of Alberta, a group affiliated with the United Farmers of Alberta, answered Reid by launching a campaign for public support in 1924. The group's president, Ms. Margaret Gunn, stated that “democracy was never intended for degenerates.” In addition, group member, Ms. J.W. Field, would go on to serve as Secretary on the Alberta Eugenics Board. This group would also recommend compulsory medical examination before marriage for all Albertans.

=== Other influences ===
In Western Canada, many influential citizens and interest groups campaigned for segregation and sterilization of the feebleminded. Emily Murphy, the first female magistrate for the British Empire, was a prolific and influential writer who organized meetings and addressed many women's groups in support of negative eugenics. J. S. Woodsworth, preacher and Superintendent of All People's Mission in Winnipeg, conducted and published studies on immigration and social response. Woodsworth's reports concerning the quality of immigrants aided in creating a public crisis. Together, these individuals published numerous articles in popular magazines and spoke at public meetings in support of sterilization.

There are also ties to the University of Alberta. Dr. John M. MacEachran, founder of the Department of Philosophy and Psychology, was also long time chairman of the Eugenics Board, and Robert Charles Wallace, President of the University of Alberta in 1934, was an outspoken supporter of eugenic sterilization.

The highest form of provincial government would show support - Premier John Edward Brownlee stated that “the argument of freedom or right of the individual can no longer hold good where the welfare of the state and of society is concerned.”

Many other factors influenced public opinion including the creation in 1930 of the Eugenics Society of Canada, acceptance of sterilization laws in many of the United States, and numerous newspapers, magazines and books touting sterilization as a remedy for rapidly increasing social problems.

== Sexual sterilization on trial ==
In 1995, Leilani Muir sued Alberta for stigmatization as a moron, wrongful confinement, and sterilization.

At the age of 10, Muir, an unwanted and abused child, was admitted to the Provincial Training School for Mental Defectives (PTS) in Red Deer, Alberta. She was confined to the facility until 1965 when she left against medical direction. Years later, during struggles with infertility, failed marriages and depression, Muir would learn that she had been sterilized during an appendectomy while detained at the PTS. Further, IQ testing would reveal that Muir did not suffer from mental deficiency.

The court ruled in favour of the plaintiff and awarded Muir $740,780 CAD and an additional sum of $230,000 CAD for legal costs.

This precedent-setting case opened the doors for other individuals seeking reparation for suffering under the Sexual Sterilization Act.

== Resources ==
- Christian, Timothy J. The Mentally Ill and Human Rights in Alberta: A Study of the Alberta Sexual Sterilization Act. University of Alberta, Faculty of Law, 1973.
- Dowbiggin, Ian Robert. Keeping America Sane: Psychiatry and Eugenics in the United States and Canada 1880–1940. Cornell University Press, 1997.
- Grekul, Jana Marie. The Social Construction of the Feebleminded Threat: Implementation of the Sexual Sterilization Act in Alberta 1929 – 1972. University of Alberta, Ph.D. Thesis, 2002.
- Grekul, Jana Marie. "A Well-Oiled Machine: Alberta's Eugenics Program, 1928-1972", in Alberta History, vol. 59, no. 3. Summer 2011. pp. 16–23.
- Grekul, Jana; Krahn, Harvey; Odynak, Dave. "Sterilizing the “Feeble-minded”: Eugenics in Alberta, Canada, 1929–1972", in Journal of Historical Sociology, Vol. 17, No. 4, December 2004.
- Institute of Law Research and Reform. Competence and Human Reproduction, Report No. 52. Edmonton, Alberta, February 1989.
- Institute of Law Research and Reform. Sterilization Decisions: Minors and Mentally Incompetent Adults, Report for Discussion No. 6. Edmonton, Alberta, March 1988.
- National Film Board of Canada. The Sterilization of Leilani Muir. Video recording, 1996.
- McLaren, Angus. Our Own Master Race: Eugenics in Canada, 1885–1945. John Deyell Company, 1990.
- Wahlsten, Douglas. Genetica 99. Netherlands: Kluwer Academic Publishers, 1997.
