= African Society of Human Genetics =

Scientific society

- Formation: 2003; 23 years ago
- Fields: Human genetics; Genomics
- President: Ambroise Wonkam
- Website: www.afshg.org

The African Society of Human Genetics (AfSHG) is a learned society and professional membership organization focused on the study of human genetics and genomics in Africans, and open to researchers who are interested in the subject. It has played a role in founding several national genetics societies, and is affiliated with the societies of Cameroon, the Democratic Republic of the Congo, Mali, Egypt, Rwanda, Senegal, South Africa, and Tanzania.

As the origin of Homo sapiens, Africa is home to the widest array of human genetic diversity. The continent also has a high disease burden. Despite these factors, genetic research on the continent was inadequate, and no existing organization was sufficiently dedicated to the task. Holding its inaugural conference in Accra, Ghana, the Society was founded in 2003 to increase research capacity in Africa, support African researchers, and improve research of African people. Since then, it and its flagship project (H3Africa) have been important factors in the growth of genomic research in Africa.

== Mission ==
Though Africa is home to the widest range of human genetic variation, it trails the West in biomedical research and many of its countries do not have departments of human genetics. The AfSHG was established in 2003 to give African scientists and policymakers the knowledge and infrastructure to contribute to genomic research, to promote African researchers internationally, and to "foster genetics research in Africa to generate knowledge for the prevention of disease and the promotion of health." It also aims to create national-level human genetics societies, and to provide an environment where African scientists can network and collaborate.

== History ==
The AfSHG was created to fill a gap in the research of human genetics in Africa. Most training in genomics and bioinformatics was concentrated in a few institutions and depended heavily on expertise from European and American researchers; many Africans who completed graduate training abroad returned to find their homelands had little infrastructure or funding for them to continue research. Scientists decided that no other organization or conference was capable of addressing the need for better genetic, genomic, and biomedical research on the continent, nor to address its lack of research capacity. The Society was established in 2003, with Charles Rotimi elected as its first president. Its inaugural conference was held on December 8–9 in Accra, Ghana and was supported by a grant written by Rotimi, Clement Adebamowo, and Adebowale Adeyemo; the inaugural theme was "Biomedical Research in Africa with Emphasis on Genetics."

Since its inception, the AfSHG has been involved in creating national-level societies and coordinating international projects. The fifth meeting was held in Cairo, Egypt in 2007, jointly with the first meeting of the National Society of Human Genetics of Egypt (NSHG); here, the Society proposed the project that eventually became H3Africa. The sixth meeting, held in 2009 in Yaoundé, Cameroon inaugurated the Cameroonian Society of Human Genetics (CSHG). By this time, the AfSHG had over 400 members from 24 countries (16 in Africa, 8 elsewhere). The Society established working groups on communicable and non-communicable diseases, to be led respectively by Sekou F. Traore and Bongani Mayosi. After the meeting, Philip Mjwara, the Director General of South Africa's Department of Science and Innovation, urged the Southern African Society of Human Genetics (SASHG)—which had existed since 1986—to affiliate itself with the AfSHG.

The seventh meeting was held in Cape Town in 2011, jointly with the SASHG. Introduced with talks by Rotimi and Michèle Ramsay, it focused on the importance of studying genetic diversity in Africans and its relationship to disease predisposition, and how to carry out such studies on the continent. The ninth meeting, held in Dakar, Senegal in 2016, led to the creation of the Senegalese Society of Human Genetics (S2HG). It was the first AfSHG meeting to be held in an exclusively francophone nation, marking an important milestone—Senegal, along with 12 other African nations, uses French in academia.

The AfSHG returned to Cairo for its meeting 2017. The main conclusion was that researchers need to increase efforts to close the research gap between Africa and other continents; each year, brain drain costs the continent about 20,000 scientists to higher-income countries. Stopping this would require reinforcing and expanding existing infrastructure and research capacity and creating local opportunities. At the following conference, held in Kigali, Rwanda in 2018, the Society again emphasized the importance of developing infrastructure and resources through local government investment and increased collaboration between institutions across Africa.

By 2021, the AfSHG was one of the driving factors in the growth of genomics in Africa. Though the continent had developed a strong core of genomics professionals, researchers echoed calls for increased funding from within Africa from philanthropic, public, and private sectors, and for increased investment in health care systems for translational research. Its president, Ambroise Wonkam, also proposed that the Society's next major scientific initiative should be to sequence three million African genomes—the Three Million African Genomes (3MAG) Project—to cover the spectrum of human genetic variation in Africa. The organization called for an end to racism in science in August 2022 stating that "Black Lives Matter and Black Research Matters". In particular, it called for an end to helicopter research in African genomics and for more African-led and -funded research.

== H3Africa ==
During the meeting in Cairo in 2007, the membership agreed the AfSHG should spearhead an African Genome Project (AGP); the keynote speech, titled "Africa and the Genome Revolution" was given by Francis Collins, who was one of the leaders of the Human Genome Project. The AGP would have four components: population genetics, medical genetics, training, and infrastructure. Among its goals, it would sample at least 100 ethnic groups from the continent, develop large-scale resource to study gene-environment interplay of diseases in Africa, train African scientists, and establish laboratories and local research capacity. At the 2009 meeting in Yaoundé, the AGP concept was renamed "Human Heredity and Health in Africa" (H3Africa) to reflect its goals and scope.

The United States' National Institutes of Health (NIH) and the United Kingdom's Wellcome Trust announced initial funding for H3Africa in London in 2010. Following AfSHG deliberations in 2011 at Yaoundé and Oxford, researchers released the H3Africa white paper. As part of the initiative, the AfSHG would develop a database of all universities, institutions, and scientists working on human genetics in Africa. The first H3Africa investigators met in 2012 in Addis Ababa, Ethiopia. The initiative has since created numerous biobanks and repositories, bioinformatics hubs, and training programs in human genetics.

By 2020, H3Africa had published its milestone paper in Nature—a whole genome analysis of 426 individuals from 50 ethnolinguistic groups in Africa, including previously unsampled populations—and about 300 other manuscripts describing new data and results. The paper was a major step for African genomics: it uncovered millions of new genetic variants, and most of its authors were based in African institutions.

== Member societies ==
- Cameroonian Society of Human Genetics (CSHG)
- Congolese Society for Human Genetics (CoSHG)
- Malian Society of Human Genetics (MSHG)
- National Society of Human Genetics of Egypt (NSHG)
- Rwandan Society of Human Genetics (RSHG)
- Senegalese Society of Human Genetics (S2GH)
- Southern African Society of Human Genetics (SASHG)
- Tanzania Society of Human Genetics (TSHG)

== Meetings ==
No.	Host city	Country	Year	Theme	Ref.
1	Accra	Ghana	2003	Biomedical Research in Africa with Emphasis on Genetics	
2	Washington, D.C.	USA	2004	Sustaining the African Society of Human Genetics	
3	Johannesburg	South Africa	2005	Human Genetic Variation in Africa	
4	Addis Ababa	Ethiopia	2006	Human Genetic Variation and Disease	
5	Cairo	Egypt	2007	Genomics Research in Africa: Implications for Disease Diagnosis, Treatment and Drug Development	
6	Yaoundé	Cameroon	2009	Human Origin, Genetic Diversity and Health	
7	Cape Town	South Africa	2011	Building Capacity for Genomic and Translational Research in Africa	
8	Accra	Ghana	2013	Advancing Genomic Research in Africa: A Joint Conference of the AfSHG and H3Africa Consortium	
9	Dakar	Senegal	2016	Strengthening Human Genetics Research in Africa	
10	Cairo	Egypt	2017	Human Genetics and Genomics in Africa: Challenges for Both Rare and Common Genetic Disorders	
11	Kigali	Rwanda	2018	Building skills and resources for genomics, epigenetic and bioinformatics research in Africa	
12	Bamako	Mali	2019	Genetics and Human Genomics as a Unifying factor for Harmony and Progress in Africa	
13	Dar es Salaam	Tanzania	2021	Genomics and translational research to improve health in Africa	
14	Rabat	Morocco	2022	Applications of Genomic Medicine in Africa	

== Presidents ==
- Charles Rotimi (2003–2014)
- Michèle Ramsay (2014–2019)
- Ambroise Wonkam (2019–present)
