= Charles Rotimi =

Nigerian geneticist

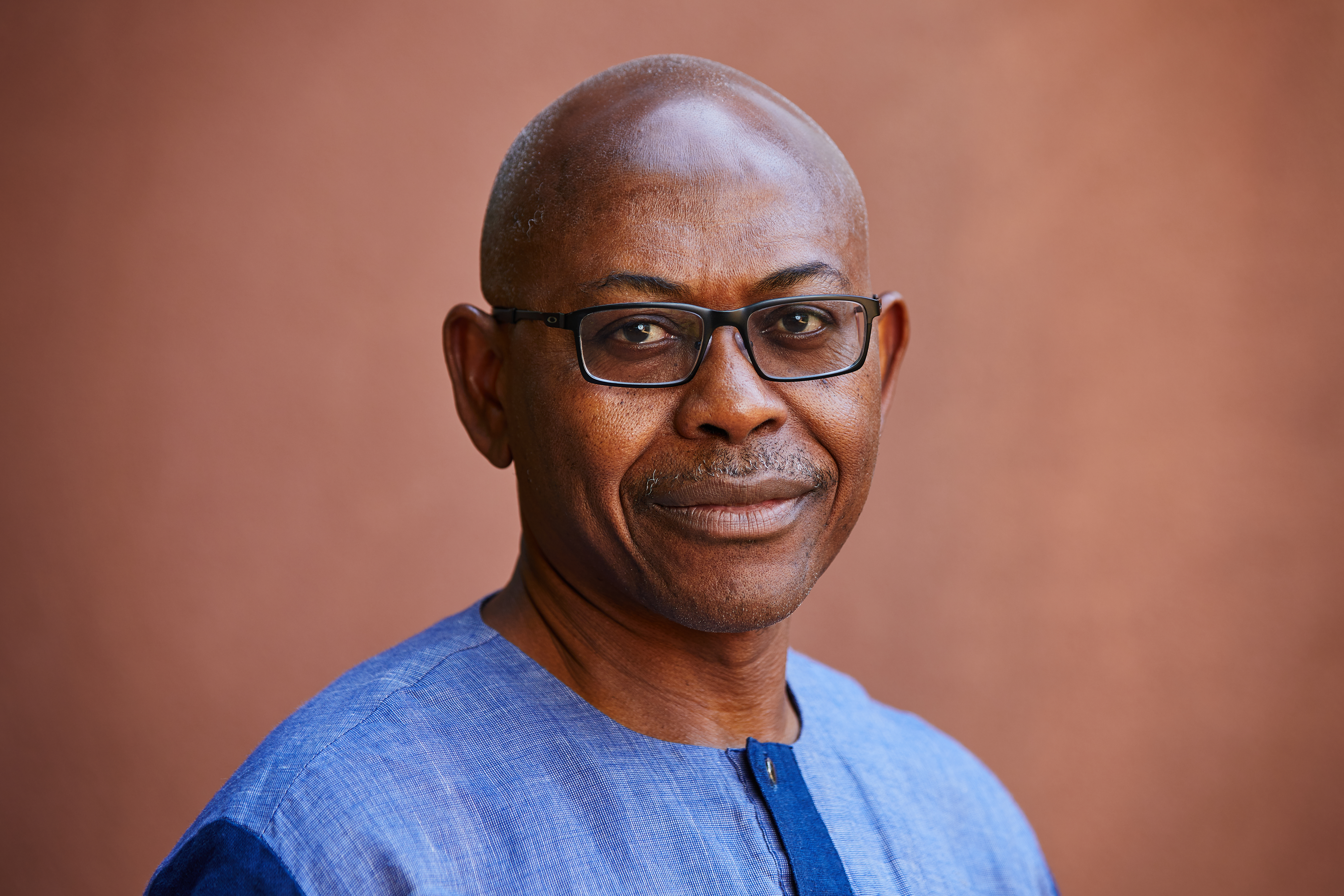
- Born: Charles Nohuoma Rotimi; 1957 (age 68–69); Benin City
- Education: University of Benin (BS); University of Mississippi (MS); University of Alabama at Birmingham (MPH); University of Alabama at Birmingham (PhD)
- Awards: Elected to the National Academy of Medicine (2018)
- Scientific career
- Workplaces: Howard University; Loma Linda University; Loyola University Chicago; NIH
- Thesis: A follow-up study of mortality and a nested case-control study of stomach cancer among foundry and automobile engine manufacturing plant workers (1991)
- Website: irp.nih.gov/pi/charles-rotimi

Charles Nohuoma Rotimi (born 1957) is the Scientific Director of the National Human Genome Research Institute (NHGRI). He joined the National Institutes of Health (NIH) in 2008 as the inaugural Director of the Trans-NIH (Note: "Trans" as in "Trans-National") Center for Research in Genomics and Global Health and was also the chief of the NHGRI's Metabolic, Cardiovascular, and Inflammatory Disease Genomics Branch. He works to ensure that population genetics include genomes from African populations and founded the African Society of Human Genetics in 2003 and was elected its first president. Rotimi was instrumental in the launch of the Human Heredity and Health in Africa (H3Africa) with the NIH and the Wellcome Trust. He was elected to the National Academy of Medicine in 2018.

== Early life and education ==
Rotimi was born in Benin City, Nigeria, and is the second oldest of six children. His mother had no education and his father was a high school English teacher. Rotimi studied at the University of Benin and graduated in 1979. He led the chemistry lab at a high school in Benin. He decided to attend graduate school abroad, and applied to universities in the United Kingdom and United States. He was supported by his family to attend the University of Mississippi, where he studied health care administration. He flew from Nigeria to Mississippi via London, including catching a helicopter from Gatwick Airport to Heathrow Airport. While studying at the University of Mississippi, Rotimi met his wife Deatrice, who was from Chicago. He graduated with a master's degree in 1983. In 1985 he returned to Nigeria and was appointed an administrator at a local health ministry. He returned to America to complete a program in epidemiology at the University of Alabama, and was awarded a full scholarship to complete a doctorate. Rotimi completed his PhD and then spent a year as a postdoc at the Loma Linda University in California. Here he worked on Alzheimer's disease.

== Research and career ==
Rotimi investigates genetics and health disparities, ensuring that African genomes are represented in genome databases. He was appointed as an epidemiologist at Loyola University Chicago, where he worked on cardiovascular disease and obesity in people in the African diaspora. Together with his colleague Richard Cooper, Rotimi recruited 10,000 people to study the prevalence of hypertension in populations of West African descent. He found that hypertension and diabetes rates are significantly higher in African-American populations in Chicago than they are in rural Africa. He attributed this to lifestyle factors, including weight, salt consumption and levels of physical activity.

Rotimi moved to Howard University in 1990, where he worked with Georgia M. Dunston at the National Human Genome Center. Rotimi was promoted to head of genetic epidemiology. Here he studied the impact of the underrepresentation of African and African-American data in genomic datasets. He argued for the use of genomic tools to understand variation in human biology, but pointed out that it is not possible to use genetics to define race; the variation in genomes do not account for the socially defined racial groups and racial self-identity. He compiled genomic data from 6,000 people in 13 language families, identifying 21 global genetic ancestries. The study established that 97 % of people have mixed ancestry, emphasising the problems with labels such as hispanic, black and white. In an interview with The Lancet, Rotimi described inequality as "one of the most outrageous aspects of society".

Rotimi led the African component of the International HapMap Project, which contributed to the 1000 Genomes Project. He recruited three African communities in Kenya and Nigeria, ensuring that African genomes were part of the record. It is understood that homo sapiens originated in Africa, leaving after 100,000 years. During this time much of the genetic evolution had already occurred, and those that emigrated carried a subset of the original genetic diversity. African genomes are the most ancient.

Rotimi looks at the heritability of complex disease. He began to work with Kári Stefánsson in 2007, studying the diabetes risk variant TCF7L2 in West African populations. He demonstrated that both TCF7L2 and its genetic variant HapA increase the risk of diabetes due to their function in energy metabolism. To determine the origins of the sickle cell disease mutation, Rotimi studied the genomes of 3,000 people. He identified that sickle cell emerged around 7,000 years ago in Africa.

Rotimi joined the National Institutes of Health in 2007, where he became founding director of the Trans-NIH Center for Research on Genomics and Global Health. He works with Francis Collins on making genomic studies more inclusive. Rotimi founded the African Society of Human Genetics in 2003. He launched the Human Heredity and Health in Africa (H3Africa) initiative with the African Society of Human Genetics, a $70 million collaboration between the National Institutes of Health and Wellcome Trust. He described the project as a "lifetime achievement".

=== Awards and honors ===
Rotimi was elected a member of the National Academy of Medicine (NAM) in 2018. He serves on the editorial boards of Public Health Genomics, Genome Medicine, Clinical Genetics and the Journal of Applied and Translational Genomics. He was awarded the Curt Stern Award from the American Society of Human Genetics in 2019 for his contributions to genetics in African and African-descent populations.
