= Cathryn Lewis =

Professor of Genetic Epidemiology and Statistics

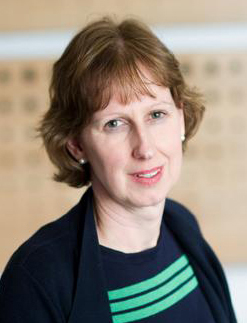
King's College portrait photo, 2013

Cathryn Lewis is Professor of Genetic Epidemiology and Statistics at King's College London. She is Head of Department at the Social, Genetic and Developmental Psychiatry Centre, Institute of Psychiatry, Psychology and Neuroscience.

She completed her BA in mathematics at St. Hilda’s College, University of Oxford, and her PhD in statistics at the University of Sheffield. She then spent five years at the University of Utah working on projects to identify BRCA1 and BRCA2 genes, before joining King’s College London in 1996. She now leads the Statistical Genetics Unit at King’s College London, a multi-disciplinary research group that develops and applies statistical methods to human genetics, to identify and characterise genes contributing to common, complex disorders.

In the Psychiatric Genomics Consortium, the international collaboration for sharing and analysing genetic data, she co-chairs the Major Depressive Disorder Working Group, with Professor Andrew McIntosh. She is an editor for journal Biological Psychiatry: Global Open Science. She was also an academic editor for journals PLOS Medicine and an Associate Editor for Human Heredity. She leads the Medical Research Council's Skills Development Fellowship programme at King's College London.

She featured in a BBC news feature broadcast on the Victoria Derbyshire (TV programme), where James Longman asked the question “Do you inherit your parent's mental illness?” and a mental health special issue of the BBC’s Trust Me I’m a Doctor.

In 2010, Lewis was part of the "Music from the Genome" team which analysed the DNA from 40 members of the New London Chamber Choir. These gene patterns were used to create a choral work, "Allele". The music subsequently won Michael Zev Gordon the 2011 British Academy of Songwriters, Composers and Authors Composer of the Year award.

She was elected a Fellow of the Academy of Medical Sciences in 2026.

== Selected publications ==
- Lewis C, Vassos E (2020). "Polygenic risk scores: from research tools to clinical instruments". Genome Medicine. 12 (44): 44. doi:10.1186/s13073-020-00742-5. PMC 7236300. PMID 32423490.
- Wray NR, Ripke S, Mattheisen M, et al. (May 2018). "Genome-wide association analyses identify 44 risk variants and refine the genetic architecture of major depression". Nature Genetics. 50 (5): 668–681. doi:10.1038/s41588-018-0090-3. PMC 5934326. PMID 29700475.
- Power RA, Tansey KE, Buttenschøn HN, et al. (February 2017). "Genome-wide Association for Major Depression Through Age at Onset Stratification: Major Depressive Disorder Working Group of the Psychiatric Genomics Consortium". Biological Psychiatry. 81 (4): 325–335. doi:10.1016/j.biopsych.2016.05.010. PMC 5262436. PMID 27519822.
- Lewis CM, Vassos E (November 2017). "Prospects for using risk scores in polygenic medicine". Genome Medicine. 9 (1): 96. doi:10.1186/s13073-017-0489-y. PMC 5683372. PMID 29132412.
- Euesden, J; Lewis, CM; O'Reilly, PF (May 2015). "PRSice: Polygenic Risk Score software". Bioinformatics. 31 (9): 1466–1468. doi:10.1093/bioinformatics/btu848. PMC 4410663. PMID 25550326.
- Vassos, Evangelos; Pedersen, Carsten B.; Murray, Robin M.; Collier, David A.; Lewis, Cathryn M. (2012). "Meta-analysis of the association of urbanicity with schizophrenia". Schizophrenia Bulletin. 38 (6): 1118–1123. doi:10.1093/schbul/sbs096. PMC 3494055. PMID 23015685.
- Lewis, Cathryn M.; Ng, Mandy Y.; Butler, Amy W.; Cohen-Woods, Sarah; Uher, Rudolf; Pirlo, Katrina; Weale, Michael E.; et al. (2010). "Genome-wide association study of major recurrent depression in the UK population". American Journal of Psychiatry. 167 (8): 949–957. doi:10.1176/appi.ajp.2010.09091380. PMID 20516156.
- Lewis, Cathryn M.; Levinson, Douglas F.; Wise, Lesley H.; DeLisi, Lynn E.; Straub, Richard E.; Hovatta, Iiris; Williams, Nigel M.; et al. (2003). "Genome scan meta-analysis of schizophrenia and bipolar disorder, part II: Schizophrenia". The American Journal of Human Genetics. 73 (1): 34–48. doi:10.1086/376549. PMC 1180588. PMID 12802786.
