= Personality psychology =

Branch of psychology focused on personality

Personality psychology is a branch of psychology that examines personality and its variation among individuals. It aims to show how people are individually different due to psychological forces. Its areas of focus include:

- Describing what personality is.
- Documenting how personalities develop.
- Explaining the mental processes of personality and how they affect functioning.
- Providing a framework for understanding individuals.

"Personality" is a dynamic and organized set of characteristics possessed by an individual that uniquely influences their environment, cognition, emotions, motivations, and behaviors in various situations. The word personality originates from the Latin persona, which means "mask".

Personality also pertains to the pattern of thoughts, feelings, social adjustments, and behaviors persistently exhibited over time that strongly influence one's expectations, self-conceptions, values, and attitudes. Environmental and situational effects on behaviour are influenced by psychological mechanisms within a person. Personality also predicts human reactions to other people and their behavior, problems, and stress. Gordon Allport, in 1937, described two major ways to study personality: the nomothetic and the idiographic.Nomothetic psychology seeks general laws that can be applied to many different people, such as the principle of self-actualization or the traits of extraversion and introversion. Idiographic psychology is an attempt to understand the unique aspects of a particular individual.

The study of personality has a broad and varied history in psychology, with an abundance of theoretical traditions. The major theories include dispositional (trait) perspective, psychodynamic, humanistic, biological, behaviorist, evolutionary, and social learning perspective. Many researchers and psychologists do not explicitly identify themselves with only one perspective and instead take an eclectic approach. Research in this area is empirically driven—such as dimensional models based on multivariate statistics like factor analysis—or emphasizes theory development, such as psychodynamic theory. There is also a substantial emphasis on the applied field of personality testing.

== Philosophical assumptions ==
Many of the ideas conceptualized by historical and modern personality theorists stem from their basic philosophical assumptions. The study of personality is not a purely empirical discipline, as it brings in elements of art, science, and philosophy to draw general conclusions. The following five categories are some of the most fundamental philosophical assumptions on which theorists disagree:

- Freedom versus determinism: This is the question of whether humans have control over their own behavior and understand the motives behind it, or if forces beyond their control causally determine their behavior. Behavior is categorized as being either unconscious, environmental, or biological by various theories.
- Heredity (nature) versus environment (nurture): Personality is thought to be determined largely either by genetics and biology, or by environment and experiences. Contemporary research suggests that most personality traits are based on the joint influence of genetics and environment. One of the forerunners in this arena is C. Robert Cloninger, who pioneered the Temperament and Character model.
- Uniqueness versus universality: This question discusses the extent of each human's individuality (uniqueness) or similarity in nature (universality). Gordon Allport, Abraham Maslow, and Carl Rogers were all advocates of the uniqueness of individuals. Behaviorists and cognitive theorists, in contrast, emphasize the importance of universal principles, such as reinforcement and self-efficacy.
- Active versus reactive: This question explores whether humans primarily act through individual initiative (active) or through outside stimuli. Traditional behavioral theorists typically believed that humans are passively shaped by their environments, whereas humanistic and cognitive theorists believe that humans play a more active role. Most modern theorists agree that both are important, with aggregate behavior being primarily determined by traits and situational factors being the primary predictor of behavior in the short term.
- Optimistic versus pessimistic: Personality theories differ concerning whether humans are integral in changing their own personalities. Theories that place a great deal of emphasis on learning are often more optimistic than those that do not.

== Personality theories ==
=== Type and trait theories ===
Behavioral and psychological characteristics distinguishing introversion and extraversion, which are generally conceived as lying along a continuum

Personality type refers to the psychological classification of people into different classes. Personality types are distinguished from personality traits, which vary in degree. For example, in type theory, there are two types of people: introverts and extroverts. According to trait theories, introversion and extroversion lie on a continuous dimension, with many people falling in the middle. Personality is complex; a typical theory of personality contains several propositions or sub-theories, often evolving as more psychologists explore it.

- The most widely accepted empirical model of durable, universal personality descriptors is the Big Five personality traits model, which includes conscientiousness, agreeableness, neuroticism, openness to experience, and extraversion and introversion. It is based on cluster analysis of verbal descriptions in self-reporting surveys. These traits demonstrate considerable genetic heritability.
- Buddhist: Perhaps the most ancient attempt at personality psychology is the personality typology outlined by the Indian Buddhist Abhidharma schools. The Abhidharma typology primarily focuses on negative personal traits (e.g., greed, hatred, and delusion) and the corresponding Buddhist meditation practices used to counter them.
- Jung and Marston: An influential European tradition of psychological types originated in the theoretical work of Carl Jung, specifically, in his 1921 book Psychologische Typen (Psychological Types), as well the work of William Moulton Marston. In the former Soviet Union, Lithuanian Aušra Augustinavičiūtė independently developed a model of personality type based on Jung's socionics. Later, many other tests were developed based on this model, including, for example, Golden, PTI-Pro, and JTI.
- Myers and Briggs: Building on the writings and observations of Jung during World War II, Isabel Briggs Myers and her mother, Katharine Cook Briggs, delineated personality types by constructing the Myers–Briggs Type Indicator (MBTI), which has since been characterized as pseudoscientific. This model was later used by David Keirsey with a different understanding from Jung, Briggs, and Myers.

Theories could also be considered an "approach" to personality or psychology and are generally referred to as models. The "model" is an older and more theoretical approach to personality, accepting extroversion and introversion as basic psychological orientations in connection with two pairs of psychological functions:

- Perceiving functions: sensing and intuition (i.e., trust in concrete, sensory-oriented facts vs. trust in abstract concepts and imagined possibilities).
- Judging functions: thinking and feeling (i.e., basing decisions primarily on logic vs. deciding based on emotion).

Briggs and Myers also added another personality dimension to the MBTI to measure whether a person prefers to use a judging or perceiving function when interacting with the external world. Therefore, they included questions designed to indicate whether someone wishes to come to conclusions (judgement) or to keep options open (perception).

The MBTI personality typology has some aspects of trait theory: it explains people's behavior in terms of fixed, opposite characteristics. In these more traditional models, the sensing/intuition preference is considered the most basic, dividing people into "N" (intuitive) or "S" (sensing) personality types. An "N" is further assumed to be guided either by thinking or feeling and divided into the "NT" (scientist, engineer) or "NF" (author, humanitarian) temperament. An "S", in contrast, is assumed to be guided more by the judgment/perception axis and thus divided into the "SJ" (guardian, traditionalist) or "SP" (performer, artisan) temperament. These four are considered basic, with the other two factors in each case (including "always extraversion/introversion") less important. Critics of this traditional view have observed that the types can be quite strongly stereotyped by professions (although neither Myers nor Keirsey engaged in such stereotyping in their type descriptions), and may, therefore, arise more from the need to categorize people for purposes of guiding their career choice. This among other objections led to the emergence of the five-factor (i.e., Big Five) view, which is less concerned with behavior under work conditions and more concerned with behavior in personal and emotional circumstances. (The MBTI is not designed to measure the "work self", but rather what Myers and McCaulley called the "shoes-off self.")

- Type A and Type B personality theory: During the 1950s, Meyer Friedman and his co-workers defined what they called Type A and Type B behavior patterns. They theorized that intense, hard-driving Type A personalities had a higher risk of coronary disease because they are "stress junkies." Type B people, on the other hand, tended to be relaxed, less competitive, and lower-risk. There was also a Type AB mixed profile.

Health psychology, which studies how individuals engage with and self-conceptualize their health, has been influenced by the Type A and Type B personality theories, which reveal how personality traits can impact cardiovascular health. Type A individuals, known for their competitiveness and urgency, may have an elevated risk for cardiovascular conditions like high blood pressure and coronary heart disease relative to the general population.

Day and Jreige, in a 2002 study, investigated the Type A behavior pattern as a mediator in the relationship between job stressors and psychosocial outcomes. Their study, published in the Journal of Occupational Health Psychology, demonstrated that individuals exhibiting Type A characteristics were more susceptible to adverse psychosocial effects, such as increased stress and lower job satisfaction, when exposed to workplace stressors. Their research, therefore, highlighted the importance of considering personality traits in managing occupational health.

- Eduard Spranger's personality model, consisting of six (or, in some revisions, 6+1) basic types of value attitudes, as described in his book Types of Men.
- The Enneagram of Personality is a model of human personality that is principally used as a typology of nine interconnected personality types. It has been criticized as being subject to interpretation, making it difficult to test or validate scientifically. The Enneagram was taught by former Fulbright scholar Claudio Naranjo stuying at Harvard under Gordon Allport. The pioneering model was designed for use by Psychotherapists but has been popularized by many. See "Taking with the Left Hand". Recent studies of the model are shared by International Psychotherapy Network. Distinguished Professor Daniel Siegel and faculty of National Institute of Health have published study integrating biology and Enneagram.
- John L. Holland's RIASEC vocational model, commonly referred to as the Holland Codes, focuses specifically on choice of occupation. It proposes that six personality types influence people's career choices. In this circumplex model, the six types are arranged in a hexagon, with adjacent types more closely related than those farther apart. The model is widely used in vocational counseling.

=== Psychoanalytical theories ===
Psychoanalytic theories explain human behavior in terms of the interaction of various components of personality. Sigmund Freud was the founder of this school of thought. He drew on the physics of his day (thermodynamics) to coin the term psychodynamics. Based on the idea of converting heat into mechanical energy, Freud proposed that psychic energy could be converted into behavior. His theory places central importance on dynamic, unconscious psychological conflicts.

Freud divides human personality into three significant components: the id, ego, and superego. The id acts according to the pleasure principle, demanding immediate gratification of its needs regardless of external environment; the ego then must emerge to realistically meet the wishes and demands of the id in accordance with the outside world, adhering to the reality principle. Finally, the superego (conscience) instills moral judgment and societal rules in the ego, compelling the ego to meet the demands of the id not only realistically but also morally. The superego is the last function of the personality to develop, and is the embodiment of parental/social ideals established during childhood. According to Freud, personality is based on the dynamic interactions of these three components.

The channeling and release of sexual (libidal) and aggressive energies, which ensues from the "Eros" (sex; instinctual self-preservation) and "Thanatos" (death; instinctual self-annihilation) drives respectively, are major components of his theory. Freud's broad understanding of sexuality included all kinds of pleasurable feelings experienced by the human body.

Freud proposed five psychosexual stages of personality development. He believed that adult personality is dependent on early childhood experiences and is largely determined by age five. Fixations that develop during the infantile stage contribute to adult personality and behavior.

One of Sigmund Freud's early associates, Alfred Adler, agreed with Freud that early childhood experiences are important for development and believed that birth order may influence personality. Adler believed that the oldest child would set high achievement goals to compensate for the attention lost when younger siblings were born. He believed the middle children were competitive and ambitious. He reasoned that this behavior was motivated by the desire to surpass the firstborn's achievements. He added, however, that the middle children were often not as concerned about the glory attributed to their behavior. He also believed the youngest would be more dependent and sociable. Adler concluded that an only child loves being the center of attention, matures quickly, but ultimately fails to become independent.

Heinz Kohut thought similarly to Freud's idea of transference. He used narcissism as a model of how people develop their sense of self. Narcissism is the exaggerated sense of self in which one is believed to exist to protect one's low self-esteem and sense of worthlessness. Kohut had a significant impact on the field by extending Freud's theory of narcissism and introducing what he called the 'self-object transferences' of mirroring and idealization. In other words, children need to idealize, emotionally "sink into," and identify with the competence of admired figures such as parents or older siblings. They also need to have their self-worth mirrored by these people. Such experiences allow them to learn self-soothing and other skills necessary for developing a healthy sense of self.

Another important figure in the world of personality theory is Karen Horney. She is credited with developing "feminist psychology". She disagrees with Freud on some key points, one being that women's personalities are not just a function of "Penis Envy", but that girl children have separate and different psychic lives unrelated to how they feel about their fathers or primary male role models. She talks about three basic Neurotic needs: "Basic Anxiety", "Basic Hostility", and "Basic Evil". She posits that to any anxiety an individual experiences, they would have one of three approaches: moving toward people, moving away from people, or moving against people. It is these three that give us varying personality types and characteristics. She also places a high premium on concepts such as the Overvaluation of Love and romantic partners.

=== Behaviorist theories ===
Behaviorists explain personality in terms of the effects external stimuli have on behavior. The approaches used to evaluate the behavioral aspect of personality are known as behavioral theories, or learning and conditioning theories. These approaches were a radical shift away from Freudian philosophy. One of the major tenets of this concentration of personality psychology is a strong emphasis on scientific thinking and experimentation. This school of thought was developed by B. F. Skinner, who put forth a model that emphasized the mutual interaction between the person, or "the organism," and its environment. Skinner believed that children do bad things because the behavior obtains attention, which serves as a reinforcer. For example, a child cries because the child's crying in the past has led to attention. These are the response and consequences. The response is the child crying, and the attention that the child gets is the reinforcing consequence. According to this theory, people's behavior is formed by processes such as operant conditioning. Skinner proposed a three-term contingency model (or a "stimulus–response–consequence" model) to promote analysis of behavior based on the question: "Under which circumstances or antecedent 'stimuli' does the organism engage in a particular behavior or 'response', which in turn produces a particular 'consequence'?"

Richard Herrnstein extended this theory by accounting for attitudes and traits. An attitude develops when the response strength (the tendency to respond) to a set of stimuli becomes stable. Rather than describing conditionable traits in non-behavioral language, response strength in a given situation accounts for the environmental portion. Herrnstein also saw traits as having a large genetic or biological component, as do most modern behaviorists.

Ivan Pavlov is another notable influence. He is well known for his classical conditioning experiments involving dogs, which laid the foundation of behaviorism.

=== Social cognitive theories ===
In cognitive theory, behavior is explained as guided by cognitions (e.g., expectations) about the world, especially those about other people. Cognitive theories of personality emphasize cognitive processes, such as thinking and judging.

Albert Bandura, a social learning theory, suggested the forces of memory and emotions worked in conjunction with environmental influences. Bandura was known mostly for his "Bobo doll experiment". During these experiments, Bandura videotaped a college student kicking and verbally abusing a Bobo Doll. He then showed this video to a class of kindergarten children who were getting ready to go out to play. When they entered the playroom, they saw Bobo Dolls and some hammers. The people observing the children at play saw a group beating the doll. He called this study and his findings observational learning, or modeling.

Early examples of approaches to cognitive style are listed by Baron (1982). These include Witkin's (1965) work on field dependency, Gardner's (1953) discovery that people had consistent preferences for the number of categories they used to categorize heterogeneous objects, and Block and Petersen's (1955) work on confidence in line discrimination judgments. Baron relates the early development of cognitive approaches of personality to ego psychology. More central to this field have been:

- Explanatory style (or attributional style) theory, which assesses the different ways by which people explain events in their lives. This approach builds upon locus of control but extends it by stating that we also need to consider whether people attribute outcomes to stable or variable causes, and to global or specific causes.

Various scales have been developed to assess both attributional style and locus of control. Locus of control scales include those used by Rotter and Duttweiler, as well as the Locus of Control Scale for Children developed by Nowicki and Strickland (1973) and various locus-of-control scales in the health domain, including the Multidimensional Health Locus of Control Scale developed by Kenneth Wallston and his colleagues. Attributional style has been assessed by the Attributional Style Questionnaire, the Expanded Attributional Style Questionnaire, the Attributions Questionnaire, the Real Events Attributional Style Questionnaire, and the Attributional Style Assessment Test.

- Achievement style theory focuses upon the identification of an individual's locus of control tendency, such as by Rotter's evaluations, and was founded by Cassandra Bolyard Whyte to provide valuable information for improving the academic performance of students. Individuals with internal control tendencies are likely to persist to better academic performance levels, presenting an achievement personality, according to Cassandra B. Whyte.

Recognition that the tendency to believe that hard work and persistence often result in attainment of life and academic goals has influenced formal educational and counseling efforts with students of various ages and in various settings since the 1970s, with research about achievement. Counseling aimed toward encouraging individuals to design ambitious goals and work toward them, with recognition that there are external factors that may impact, often results in the incorporation of a more positive achievement style by students and employees, whatever the setting, to include higher education, workplace, or justice programming.

Walter Mischel (1999) has also defended a cognitive approach to personality. His work refers to "Cognitive Affective Units" and considers factors such as stimulus encoding, affect, goal-setting, and self-regulatory beliefs. The term "Cognitive Affective Units" indicates that his approach considers both affect and cognition.

Cognitive-experiential self-theory (CEST) is another cognitive personality theory. Developed by Seymour Epstein, CEST posits that humans operate through two independent information-processing systems: the experiential and the rational systems. The experiential system is fast and emotion-driven. The rational system is slow and logic-driven. These two systems interact to determine our goals, thoughts, and behavior.

The Personal construct theory of personality was developed by the American psychologist George Kelly in the 1950s. Kelly's fundamental view of personality was that people are like naive scientists who see the world through a particular lens, based on their uniquely organized systems of construction, which they use to anticipate events. But because people are naive scientists, they sometimes employ systems for construing the world that are distorted by idiosyncratic experiences not applicable to their current social situation. A system of construction that chronically fails to characterize and/or predict events, and is not appropriately revised to comprehend and predict one's changing social world, is considered to underlie psychopathology. From the theory, Kelly derived a psychotherapeutic approach he called The Repertory Grid Interview, which helped his patients uncover their own "constructs" with minimal intervention or interpretation by the therapist. The repertory grid was later adapted for various uses within organizations, including decision-making and interpretation of other people's world-views.

=== Humanistic theories ===
Humanistic psychology emphasizes that people have free will and that this plays an active role in shaping their behavior. Accordingly, humanistic psychology focuses on the subjective experiences of persons rather than on externally imposed, definitive factors that determine behavior. Abraham Maslow and Carl Rogers were proponents of this view, which is based on the "phenomenal field" theory of Combs and Snygg (1949). Rogers and Maslow were among a group of psychologists who worked together for a decade to produce the Journal of Humanistic Psychology. This journal primarily focused on viewing individuals as a whole rather than on separate traits and processes within the individual.

Robert W. White wrote The Abnormal Personality, which became a standard text on abnormal psychology. He also investigated the human need to strive for positive goals, such as competence and influence, to counterbalance Freud's emphasis on the pathological elements of personality development.

Maslow spent much of his time studying what he called "self-actualizing persons", those who are "fulfilling themselves and doing the best they are capable of doing". Maslow believes all who are interested in growth move towards self-actualizing (growth, happiness, satisfaction) views. Many of these people exhibit patterns across the dimensions of their personalities. Characteristics of self-actualizers according to Maslow include the four key dimensions:

1. Awareness: maintaining constant enjoyment and awe of life. These individuals often experienced a "peak experience". He defined a peak experience as an "intensification of any experience to the degree there is a loss or transcendence of self". A peak experience is one in which an individual perceives an expansion of the self and detects unity and meaning in life. Intense concentration on an activity one is involved in, such as running a marathon, may invoke a peak experience.
2. Reality and problem centered: tending to be concerned with "problems" in surroundings.
3. Acceptance/Spontaneity: accepting surroundings and what cannot be changed.
4. Unhostile sense of humor/democratic: do not take kindly to joking about others, which can be viewed as offensive. They have friends from all backgrounds and religions, and they hold very close friendships.

Maslow and Rogers emphasized a view of the person as an active, creative, experiencing human being who lives in the present and subjectively responds to current perceptions, relationships, and encounters. They disagree with the dark, pessimistic outlook of those in the Freudian psychoanalysis ranks, but rather view humanistic theories as positive and optimistic proposals which stress the tendency of the human personality toward growth and self-actualization. This progressing self will remain the center of its constantly changing world; a world that will help mold the self but not necessarily confine it. Rather, the self has the opportunity to mature through its encounters with this world. This understanding attempts to reduce the acceptance of hopeless redundancy. Humanistic therapy typically relies on the client for information about the past and its effect on the present; the client dictates the type of guidance the therapist may initiate. This allows for an individualized approach to therapy. Rogers found that patients differ in how they respond to other people. Rogers tried to model a particular approach to therapy—he stressed the reflective or empathetic response. This response type takes the client's viewpoint and reflects their feeling and the context for it. An example of a reflective response would be: "It seems you are feeling anxious about your upcoming marriage." This response type seeks to clarify the therapist's understanding while also encouraging the client to think more deeply and fully understand the feelings they have expressed.

=== Biopsychological theories ===
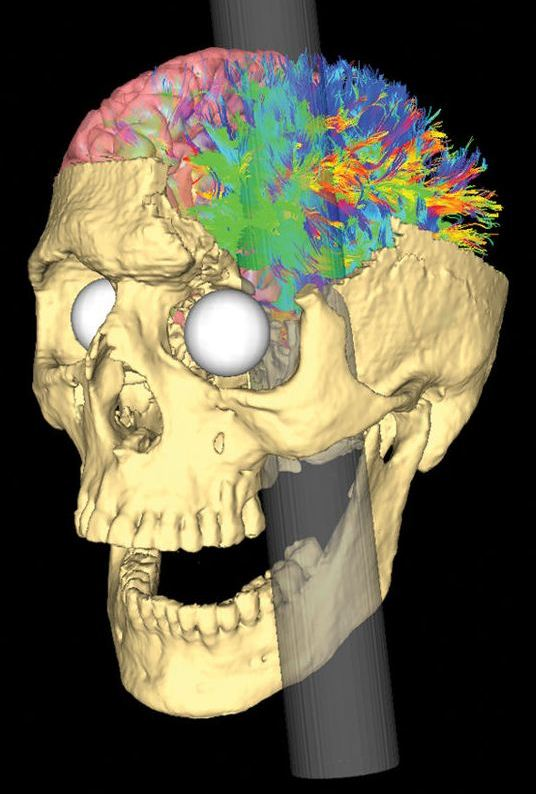
A large iron rod was driven through Gage's head, resulting in a personality change.

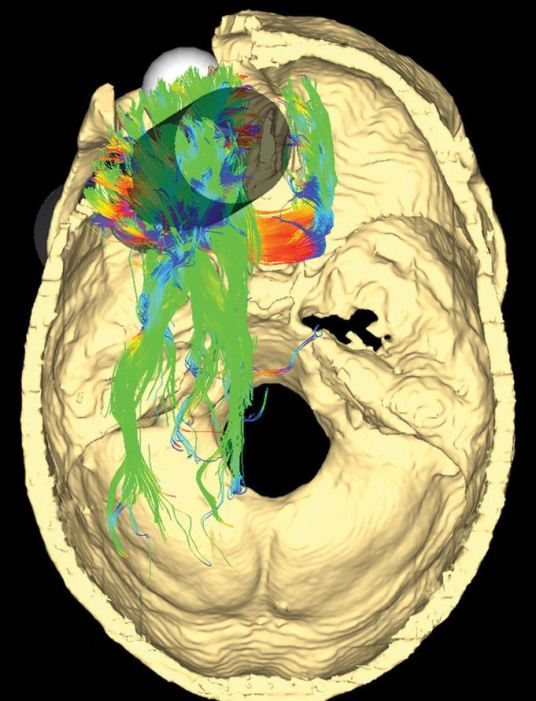
False-color representtations of cerebral fiber pathways affected in Phineas Gage's accident, per Van Horn et al.

Biology plays a very important role in the development of personality. The study of biology in personality psychology primarily focuses on identifying the role of genetic determinants and how they mold individual personalities. Some of the earliest thinking about possible biological bases of personality grew out of the case of Phineas Gage. In an 1848 accident, a large iron rod was driven through Gage's head, and his personality apparently changed as a result, although descriptions of these psychological changes are usually exaggerated.

In general, patients with brain damage have been difficult to find and study. In the 1990s, researchers began to use electroencephalography (EEG), positron emission tomography (PET), and, more recently, functional magnetic resonance imaging (fMRI), which is now the most widely used imaging technique to help localize personality traits in the brain. This line of research has led to the development of the field of personality neuroscience, which uses neuroscientific methods to study the neural underpinnings of personality traits.

==== Genetic basis of personality ====
The Human Genome Project resulted in a fuller understanding of human genetics and also prompted ongoing controversy over heritability, personality traits, and the relative influence of the environment on personality. The human genome is known to play a role in personality development.

Previously, genetic personality studies focused on specific genes correlating to specific personality traits. Today's view of the gene–personality relationship focuses primarily on the activation and expression of genes related to personality and forms part of what is referred to as behavioral genetics. Genes provide numerous options for which cells are expressed; however, the environment determines which are activated. Many studies have noted this relationship in varying ways in which our bodies can develop, but the interaction between genes and the shaping of our minds and personality is also relevant to this biological relationship.

The gene-environment interplay plays a role in the development of personality by regulating gene transcription and translation and shaping downstream phenotypes. While the genome offers different choices, in the end, the environment is the ultimate determinant of what is activated. Small differences in genetic code between individuals contribute to their uniqueness, as well as to differences in appearance, abilities, brain function, and other factors that culminate in the development of a cohesive personality.

Raymond Cattell and Hans Eysenck proposed that genetics has a powerful influence on personality. A large part of the evidence collected linking genetics and the environment to personality has come from twin studies. This "twin method" compares levels of personality similarity using genetically identical twins. One of the first of these twin studies measured 800 twin pairs, examined numerous personality traits, and found that identical twins are most similar in their general abilities. Personality similarities were found to be less related for self-concepts, goals, and interests.

Twin studies have also been important in the development of the five-factor personality model: neuroticism, extraversion, openness, agreeableness, and conscientiousness. Neuroticism and extraversion are the two most widely studied traits. Individuals scoring high in trait extraversion more often display characteristics such as impulsiveness, sociability, and activeness. Individuals scoring high in trait neuroticism are more likely to be moody, anxious, or irritable. Identical twins, however, have higher correlations in personality traits than fraternal twins. One study measuring genetic influence on twins in five different countries found that the correlations for identical twins were 0.50, while for fraternal twins they were about .020. It is suggested that heredity and environment interact to determine one's personality.

=== Evolutionary theory ===
Charles Darwin is the founder of the theory of the evolution of the species. The evolutionary approach to personality psychology is based on this theory. This theory examines how individual personality differences are based on natural selection. Through natural selection, organisms change over time by adapting and being selected. Traits develop, and certain genes are expressed based on an organism's environment and on how these traits aid its survival and reproduction.

Polymorphisms, such as sex and blood type, are forms of diversity that evolve to benefit a species as a whole. The theory of evolution has wide-ranging implications for personality psychology. Personality viewed through the lens of evolutionary biology places a great deal of emphasis on specific traits that are most likely to aid in survival and reproduction, such as conscientiousness, sociability, emotional stability, and dominance. The social aspects of personality can be seen through an evolutionary perspective. Specific character traits develop and are selected for because they play important, complex roles in the social hierarchy of organisms. Such characteristics of this social hierarchy include the sharing of important resources, family and mating interactions, and the harm or help organisms can bestow upon one another.

Evolutionary psychology proposes that stable personality differences and psychopathological traits might not be categorically distinct 'disorders' but rather that they form part of a continuum of heritable variation. In a 2022 article in Evolutionary Human Sciences, Hunt argues that temperament or personality traits like neuroticism, extraversion, or empathy may in some cases be risk factors for diagnosable conditions, depending on environmental context and degree of variation.

=== Drive theories ===
In the 1930s, John Dollard and Neal Elgar Miller met at Yale University, and began an attempt to integrate drives (see Drive theory) into a theory of personality, basing themselves on the work of Clark Hull. They began with the premise that personality could be equated with an individual's habitual responses (i.e., their habits). From there, they determined that these habitual responses were built on secondary, or acquired drives.

Secondary drives are internal needs that direct an individual's behavior and are learned. Acquired drives are learned, by and large, in the manner described by classical conditioning. When we are in a certain environment and experience a strong response to a stimulus, we internalize cues from the said environment. When we find ourselves in an environment with similar cues, we begin to act in anticipation of a similar stimulus. Thus, we are likely to experience anxiety in an environment with cues similar to one where we have experienced pain or fear, such as the dentist's office.

Secondary drives are built on primary drives, which are biologically driven, and motivate us to act with no prior learning process – such as hunger, thirst, or the need for sexual activity. However, secondary drives are thought to represent more specific elaborations of primary drives, beneath which the functions of the original primary drive persist. Thus, the primary drives of fear and pain exist behind the acquired drive of anxiety. Secondary drives can be based on multiple primary drives and even on other secondary drives. This is said to give them strength and persistence. Examples include the need for money, which was conceptualized as arising from multiple primary drives such as the drive for food and warmth, as well as from secondary drives such as imitativeness (the drive to do as others do) and anxiety.

Secondary drives vary based on the social conditions under which they were learned, such as culture. Dollard and Miller used the example of food, stating that the primary drive of hunger manifested itself behind the learned secondary drive of an appetite for a specific type of food, which depended on the individual's culture.

Secondary drives are also explicitly social, representing a way we convey our primary drives to others. Indeed, many primary drives are actively repressed by society (such as the sexual drive). Dollard and Miller believed that the acquisition of secondary drives was essential to childhood development. As children develop, they learn not to act on their primary drives, such as hunger, but acquire secondary drives through reinforcement. Friedman and Schustack describe an example of such developmental changes, stating that if an infant engaging in an active orientation towards others brings about the fulfillment of primary drives, such as being fed or having their diaper changed, they will develop a secondary drive to pursue similar interactions with others—perhaps leading to an individual being more gregarious. Dollard and Miller's belief in the importance of acquired drives led them to reconceive Sigmund Freud's theory of psychosexual development. They found themselves to agree with the timing Freud used but believed that these periods corresponded to the successful learning of certain secondary drives.

Dollard and Miller gave many examples of how secondary drives influence our habitual responses—and, by extension, personalities—including anger, social conformity, imitativeness, and anxiety, to name a few. In the case of anxiety, Dollard and Miller note that people who generalize the situation in which they experience the anxiety drive will experience anxiety far more than they should. These people are often anxious all the time, and anxiety becomes part of their personality. This example shows how drive theory can have ties with other theories of personality—many of them look at the trait of neuroticism or emotional stability in people, which is strongly linked to anxiety.

== Personality tests ==
There are two major types of personality tests, projective and objective.

Projective tests assume personality is primarily unconscious and assess individuals by how they respond to an ambiguous stimulus, such as an ink blot. Projective tests have been in use for about 60 years and continue to be used today. Examples of such tests include the Rorschach test and the Thematic Apperception Test.

The Rorschach Test involves showing an individual a series of cards with ambiguous inkblots. The individual being tested is asked to interpret the ink blots on the cards by stating everything the blots may resemble, based on their personal interpretation. The therapist then analyzes their responses. Rules for scoring the test are outlined in manuals that address a wide range of characteristics, such as content, originality of response, location of "perceived images", and other factors. Using these specific scoring methods, the therapist will then attempt to relate test responses to the individual's personality attributes and unique characteristics. The idea is that unconscious needs will come out in the person's response, e.g., an aggressive person may see images of destruction.

The Thematic Apperception Test (TAT) involves presenting individuals with vague pictures/scenes and asking them to tell a story based on what they see. Common examples of these "scenes" include images that may suggest family relationships or specific situations, such as a father and son or a man and a woman in a bedroom. Responses are analyzed for common themes. Responses unique to an individual are intended to indicate underlying thoughts, processes, and potential conflicts within the individual. Responses are believed to be directly linked to unconscious motives. There is very little empirical evidence available to support these methods.

Objective tests assume personality is consciously accessible and that self-report questionnaires can measure it. Research on psychological assessment has generally found objective tests to be more valid and reliable than projective tests. Critics have pointed to the Forer effect to suggest that some of these appear more accurate and discriminating than they really are. Issues with these tests include false reporting, as there is no way to tell whether an individual is answering questions honestly or accurately.

The Myers-Briggs Type Indicator (also known as the MBTI) is self-reporting questionnaire based on Carl Jung's Psychological Types. However, the MBTI modified Jung's theory into their own by disregarding certain processes held in the unconscious mind and the impact these have on personality.

=== Personality theory assessment criteria ===
- Verifiability – the theory should be formulated in such a way that the concepts, suggestions, and hypotheses involved in it are defined clearly and unambiguously, and logically related to each other.
- Heuristic value – to what extent the theory stimulates scientists to conduct further research.
- Internal consistency – the theory should be free from internal contradictions.
- Economy – the fewer concepts and assumptions required by the theory to explain any phenomenon, the better it is

Psychology has traditionally defined personality through behavioral patterns and, more recently, through neuroscientific studies of the brain. In recent years, some psychologists have turned to the study of inner experiences for insight into personality and individuality. Inner experiences are the thoughts and feelings of an immediate phenomenon. Another term for inner experiences is qualia. Understanding inner experiences helps explain how humans behave, act, and respond. Defining personality in terms of inner experiences has been expanding because relying solely on behavioral principles to explain one's character may seem incomplete. Behavioral methods allow the subject to be observed by an observer, whereas with inner experiences, the subject is its own observer.

=== Methods measuring inner experience ===
Descriptive experience sampling (DES): Developed by psychologist Russel Hurlburt. This is an idiographic method for examining inner experiences. This method relies on an introspective technique that allows an individual's inner experiences and characteristics to be described and measured. A beep notifies the subject to record their experience at that exact moment, and 24 hours later, an interview is given based on all the experiences recorded. DES has been used in subjects who have been diagnosed with schizophrenia and depression. It has also been crucial to studying the inner experiences of those who have been diagnosed with common psychiatric diseases.

Articulated thoughts in stimulated situations (ATSS): ATSS is a paradigm which was created as an alternative to the TA (think-aloud) method. This method assumes that people have continuous internal dialogues that can be naturally attended to. ATSS also assesses a person's inner thoughts as they verbalize their cognitions. In this procedure, subjects listen to a scenario via a video or audio player and are asked to imagine themselves in that specific situation. Later, they are asked to articulate their thoughts as they occur in reaction to the playing scenario. This method is useful for studying emotional experience, as the scenarios used can elicit specific emotions. Most importantly, the method has contributed to the study of personality. In a study conducted by Rayburn and Davison (2002), subjects' thoughts and empathy toward anti-gay hate crimes were evaluated. The researchers found that participants showed more aggressive intentions towards the offender in scenarios that mimicked hate crimes.

Experimental method: This method is an experimental paradigm used to study human experiences involved in the studies of sensation and perception, learning and memory, motivation, and biological psychology. The experimental psychologist usually deals with intact organisms. However, studies are often conducted with organisms modified by surgery, radiation, drug treatment, or long-standing deprivations of various kinds or with organisms that naturally present organic abnormalities or emotional disorders. Economists and psychologists have developed a variety of experimental methodologies to elicit and assess individual attitudes, recognizing that emotions differ from person to person. The results are then gathered and quantified to determine whether specific experiences share common factors. This method is used to clarify the experience, remove biases, and help understand its meaning and determine whether it can be generalized. The experimental method does have some complications, though. If researchers manipulate a variable, this change may affect another variable, which in turn will alter the measured result (not the original manipulated condition), introducing uncertainty. In personality research, this method often requires deception, so the ethics of experiments are also called into question.

== See also ==
- Big Five personality traits
- Blood type personality theory
- Clinical psychology
- Enneagram of Personality
- Epigenetics in psychology
- Four temperaments
- Holland Codes
- Individual differences
- Industrial & organizational assessment
- Industrial and organizational psychology
- Journal of Individual Differences
- LOTS of data
- Neurodiversity
- Psychological typologies
- Self-concealment
- Self-concept
- Self-esteem
- SoulCollage
- Team composition
- Trait leadership
- Trait theory
- Two-factor models of personality
- Type A personality
- Will (philosophy)
