= Michèle Ramsay =

South African professor of human genetics

- Education: University of the Witwatersrand
- Scientific career
- Fields: Human genetics
- Workplaces: University of the Witwatersrand

Michèle Ramsay is a South African Professor of human genetics at the University of the Witwatersrand where she is Director of the Sydney Brenner Institute for Molecular Bioscience. Ramsay's research has investigated single-gene disorders, epigenetics, obesity and hypertension. She was the President of the African Society of Human Genetics from 2014 until 2019.

== Career and impact ==
Michèle Ramsay received her PhD from the University of the Witwatersrand. Ramsay is the National Research Foundation of South Africa Research Chair on Genomics and Bioinformatics. Her research interests include the molecular epidemiology of single-gene disorders, the epigenetics of fetal alcohol spectrum disorder studied using mouse models and understanding the genetic and environmental risk factors for obesity and related diseases.

Ramsay was principal investigator of the Africa Wits INDEPTH Partnership for Genomics and Environmental Research (AWI-Gen), which was a collaborating centre of the Human Heredity and Health in Africa Consortium.

Ramsay has published over 300 peer-reviewed academic articles. She is a member of the Academy of Science of South Africa.
