= Camara Phyllis Jones =

American physician, epidemiologist, medical anthropologist

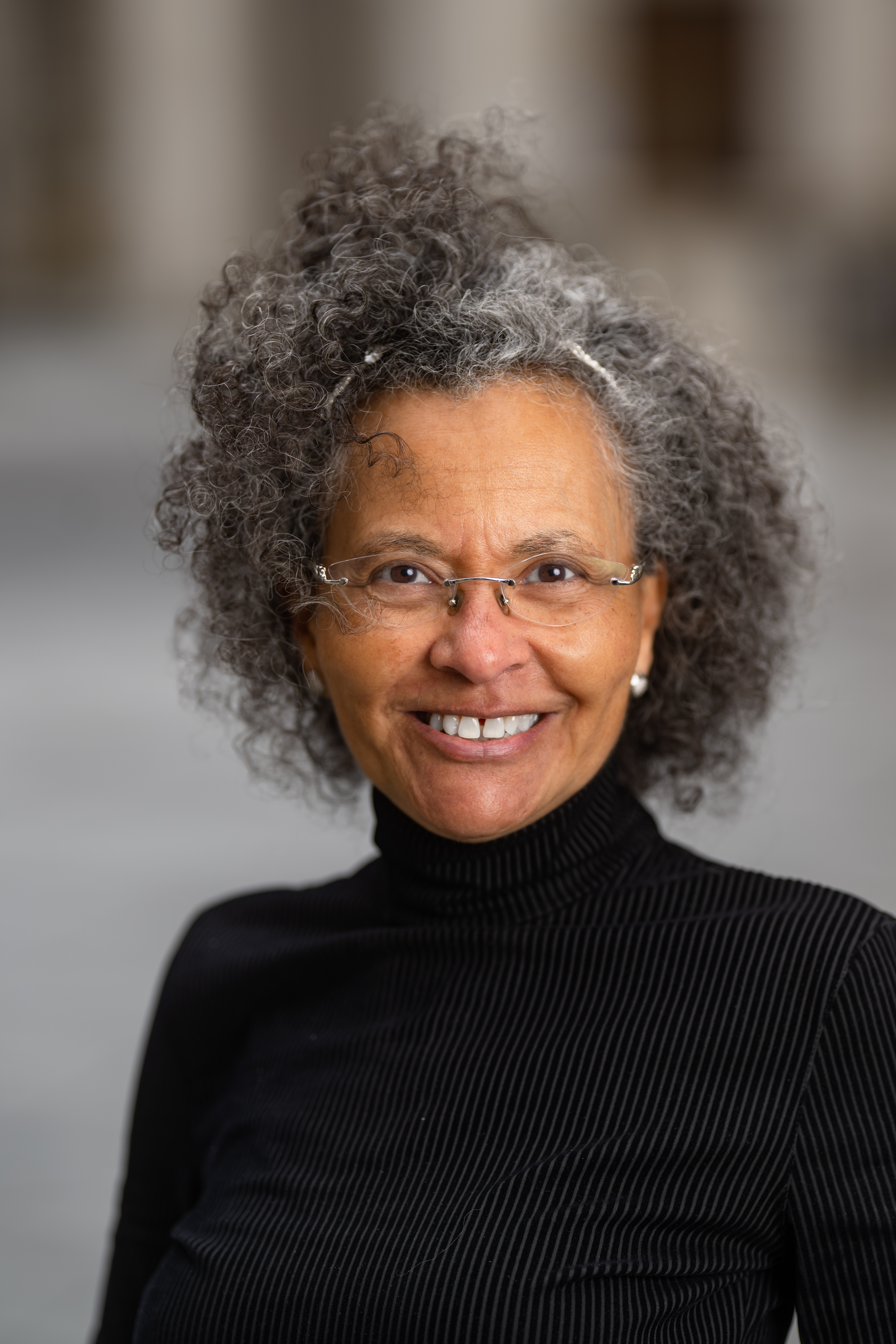
- Born: August 16, 1955 (age 71); San Francisco, California, U.S.
- Education: Wellesley College (B.A.); Stanford University School of Medicine (M.D.); Johns Hopkins University (M.P.H., Ph.D.)
- Occupation: Epidemiologist
- Children: 2

Camara Phyllis Jones (born August 16, 1955) is an American physician, epidemiologist, and anti-racism activist who specializes in the effects of racism and social inequalities on health. She is known for her work in defining institutional racism, personally mediated racism, and internalized racism in the context of modern U.S. race relations. During the COVID-19 pandemic, Jones proposed that racism was putting minority groups in the United States at greater risk of contracting COVID-19 and having severe outcomes from the infection and called for actions to address structural racism.

== Early life and education ==
Camara Phyllis Jones was born August 16, 1955, in San Francisco, California. Following her graduation from high school, Jones went on to receive her B.A. in molecular biology from Wellesley College in 1976. She then went on to earn her M.D. from the Stanford University School of Medicine in 1981 and her M.P.H. from the Johns Hopkins School of Hygiene and Public Health the following year. After receiving her medical degree, she completed residency training in 1983 for General Preventative Medicine at Johns Hopkins and completed a second residency training in 1986 in Family Practice at Montefiore Medical Center. She earned her Ph.D. in epidemiology from the Johns Hopkins School of Hygiene and Public Health in 1995. The title of her dissertation was Methods for Comparing Distributions: Development and Application Exploring "Race"-Associated Differences in Systolic Blood Pressure.

== Career ==
Jones' work focuses on naming, measuring and addressing the impacts of racism on health and well-being. To illustrate the effects of racism, Jones often uses allegories or stories, such as "The Gardener's Tale", which she shared in a 2000 article in the American Journal of Public Health and in a TEDx talk she gave in 2014. She co-authored a chapter on Action and Allegories for the American Public Health Association book, Racism: Science & Tools for the Public Health Professional.

Jones was a 2019–2020 Radcliffe Fellow at the Radcliffe Institute for Advanced Study at Harvard University. She is a Past President of the American Public Health Association (2015–2016) and a Senior Fellow at the Satcher Health Leadership Institute and the Cardiovascular Research Institute at the Morehouse School of Medicine. She was a Medical Officer and Research Director on Social Determinants of Health and Equity for the Center for Disease Control and Prevention (2000–2014).

Jones has delivered seven commencement speeches since 2013 at the UNC Gillings School of Global Public Health (2018), University of Minnesota School of Public Health (2017), Southern Illinois University School of Medicine (2017), CUNY School of Medicine (2017), UCSF School of Medicine (2016), UC Berkeley School of Public Health (2016), and the University of Washington School of Public Health (2013).

In 2016, she was awarded an honorary Doctor of Science degree by the Icahn School of Medicine at Mount Sinai.

== Faculty appointments ==
Following the completion of her residency in family practice from Montefiore Medical Center, Jones held the position of visiting assistant professor in the Department of Community Health and Social Medicine at the City University of New York Medical School from 1986 to 1987. Her first professorship was at the Harvard School of Public Health, where she held the position of assistant professor in the Departments of Health and Social Behavior, Epidemiology, and Division of Public Health Practice from 1994 to 2000.

In 2003, Jones was appointed adjunct associate professor at the Morehouse School of Medicine in the Department of Community Health and Preventive Medicine, and in 2004 she was appointed adjunct professor at the Rollins School of Public Health at Emory University in the Department of Behavioral Sciences and Health Education, and in the Department of Epidemiology.

In 2012, Jones was a visiting professor at Meharry Medical College as a part of the Scholars-in-Residence Program under the Robert Wood Johnson Foundation Center for Health Policy.

She was also a "Myron and Margaret Winegarden Visiting Professor" at the University of Michigan–Flint in the Department of Public Health and Health Sciences from 2016 to 2017.

== Awards and honors ==
- (2023): Honorary degree from Smith College.
- (2019): 2019–2020 Radcliffe Fellow: Radcliffe Institute for Advanced Study at Harvard University
- (2019): Chanchlani Global Health Research Award: McMaster University
- (2018): Wellesley Alumnae Achievement Award
- (2018): SOPHE Honorary Fellow: Society for Public Health Education
- (2018): Cato T. Laurencin MD, PhD Distinguished Research Award: W. Montague Cobb/NMA Health Institute National Medical Association
- (2018): Progressive Change Maker Award: New Leaders Council Atlanta
- (2018): Frances Borden-Hubbard Social Justice Award: The Springfield Adolescent Health Project
- (2018): Louise Stokes Health Advocacy Award: National Medical Association
- (2017): Richard and Barbara Hansen Leadership Award: The University of Iowa College of Public Health
- (2017): Outstanding Woman Leader in Healthcare Award: Leadership Summit for Women in Academic Medicine and Healthcare University of Michigan
- (2016): Shirley Nathan Pulliam Health Equity Leadership Award: University of Maryland School of Public Health and Maryland Department of Health and Mental Hygiene
- (2016): Myron and Margaret Winegarden Visiting Professor: University of Michigan–Flint
- (2016): 2016 Royal Society for Public Health Honorary Member
- (2016): Paul Cornely Award: Health Activist Dinner American Public Health Association
- (2016): Doctor of Science (honoris causa): Icahn School of Medicine at Mount Sinai
- (2016): 2016 Jonathan M. Mann Lecturer: Centers for Disease Control and Prevention (CDC) Foundation
- (2014): American Public Health Association:
  - President-Elect (2014–2015)
  - President (2015–2016)
  - Immediate Past President (2016–2017)
- (2012): Senior Fellow in Health Disparities Research: W. Montague Cobb/National Medical Association (NMA) Health Institute
- (2011): John Snow Award- Epidemiology Section: American Public Health Association and the Royal Society for Public Health
- (2010): Distinguished Service Award: Georgia State Medical Association
- (2010): Presidential Citation: Society for Public Health Education
- (2009): Hildrus A. Poindexter Distinguished Service Award: Black Caucus of Health Workers, American Public Health Association
- (2009): Nominee, Charles C. Shepard Science Award: Centers for Disease Control and Prevention (CDC)
  - Nominated in the category "Assessment and Epidemiology" for the publication: Jones, CP; Truman, BI; Elam-Evans, LD; Jones, CA; Jones, CY; Jiles, R; Rumisha, SF; Perry, GS (2008). "Using "Socially Assigned Race" to Probe White Advantages in Health Status". Ethnicity & Disease. 18 (4): 496–504. PMID 19157256.
- (2006): Fulbright Senior Specialists Roster: United States Department of State, Bureau of Educational and Cultural Affairs
- (2006): Elected inaugural member of the National Board of Public Health Examiners
- (2003): David Satcher Award: Association of State and Territorial Directors of Health Promotion and Public Health Education

== Selected works and publications ==
- Jones, CP (2000). "Levels of racism: a theoretic framework and a gardener's tale". American Journal of Public Health. 90 (8): 1212–1215. doi:10.2105/AJPH.90.8.1212. PMC 1446334. PMID 10936998.
- Jones, CP (2002). "Confronting Institutionalized Racism". Phylon. 50 (1/2): 7–22. doi:10.2307/4149999. JSTOR 4149999.
- Jones, CP; Jones, CY; Perry, GS; Barclay, G; Jones, CA (2009). "Addressing the Social Determinants of Children's Health: A Cliff Analogy". Journal of Health Care for the Poor and Underserved. 20 (4): 1–12. doi:10.1353/hpu.0.0228. PMID 20168027. S2CID 21955262.
- Jones, CP (2014). "Systems of Power, Axes of Inequity: Parallels, Intersections, Braiding the Strands". Medical Care. 52 (10 Suppl 3): S71–S75. doi:10.1097/MLR.0000000000000216. PMID 25215922.
- Jones, CP (2018). "Toward the Science and Practice of Anti-Racism: Launching a National Campaign Against Racism". Ethnicity & Disease. 28 (Suppl 1): 231–234. doi:10.18865/ed.28.S1.231 (inactive July 11, 2025). PMC 6092166. PMID 30116091.
