= Richard S. Cooper =

American cardiologist and epidemiologist

Richard Stanley Cooper (born June 7, 1945) is an American cardiologist and epidemiologist who is Chair of the Department of Public Health Sciences at Loyola University Chicago's Stritch School of Medicine. He is known for researching hypertension and other cardiac diseases in individuals of African ancestry.

== Early life and education ==
Cooper was born on June 7, 1945, in Little Rock, Arkansas. Growing up in Arkansas, he often witnessed racial discrimination against African Americans, and this later inspired him to research racial disparities in health. He worked with Charles Rotimi on the TCF7L2 protein and susceptibility for Type 2 diabetes in Western African populations. He was educated at the University of Pennsylvania, graduating with a B.A. in English in 1967, and the University of Arkansas Medical School, from which he received his M.D. in 1971. He completed training in Internal Medicine and Cardiology at Montefiore Hospital Medical Center/Albert Einstein College of Medicine in the Bronx from 1971 to 1975, and subsequently received training in epidemiology, nutrition and preventive cardiology on an NIH Fellowship at Northwestern University.

== Academic career ==
Cooper taught at Northwestern University Medical School from 1978 to 1983, and at the University of Illinois College of Medicine while serving as Director of Clinical Epidemiology at Cook County Hospital from 1985 to 1989. He joined Loyola as the Anthony B. Traub Professor and Chair of the Department of Public Health Sciences in 1989. Cooper initiated a long-running research program on cardiovascular disease in the African diaspora, involving study sites in Nigeria, Cameroon, St. Lucia, Barbados, Jamaica and metropolitan Chicago. This work has continued from 1991 through 2020, subsequently including research on obesity, diabetes and other cardio-metabolic syndromes. The project demonstrated the paramount role of social conditions and environmental exposures to risk of hypertension and obesity, providing a new perspective critical of the theory of "genetic susceptibility" among populations of African descent to these conditions that is frequently advocated within the scientific literature in the United States. He traveled widely in Africa and the Caribbean and held academic appointments at the University of Ibaban, Ibadan, Nigeria, and the University of the West Indies in Kingston, Jamaica. Cooper served as Director of a CDC-sponsored training program on prevention of cardiovascular diseases in Africa for 5 years from 2002–2007. He is founding editor-in-chief of the journal Ethnicity & Disease. He received an NIH MERIT award in 1998 for research in the African diaspora, and served as a member of the National Advisory Council of the National Human Genome Research Institute from 2008 to 2011. He has written widely on the concept of race, and its implications for health inequities and medical care. Recent publications have described both strengths and potential limitations of the application of genomic technology and the concept of "Precision Medicine" to prevention and treatment of common disease.
