= Andrew M. McIntosh =

British psychiatrist

Andrew McIntosh FRCPsych FRSE FMedSci
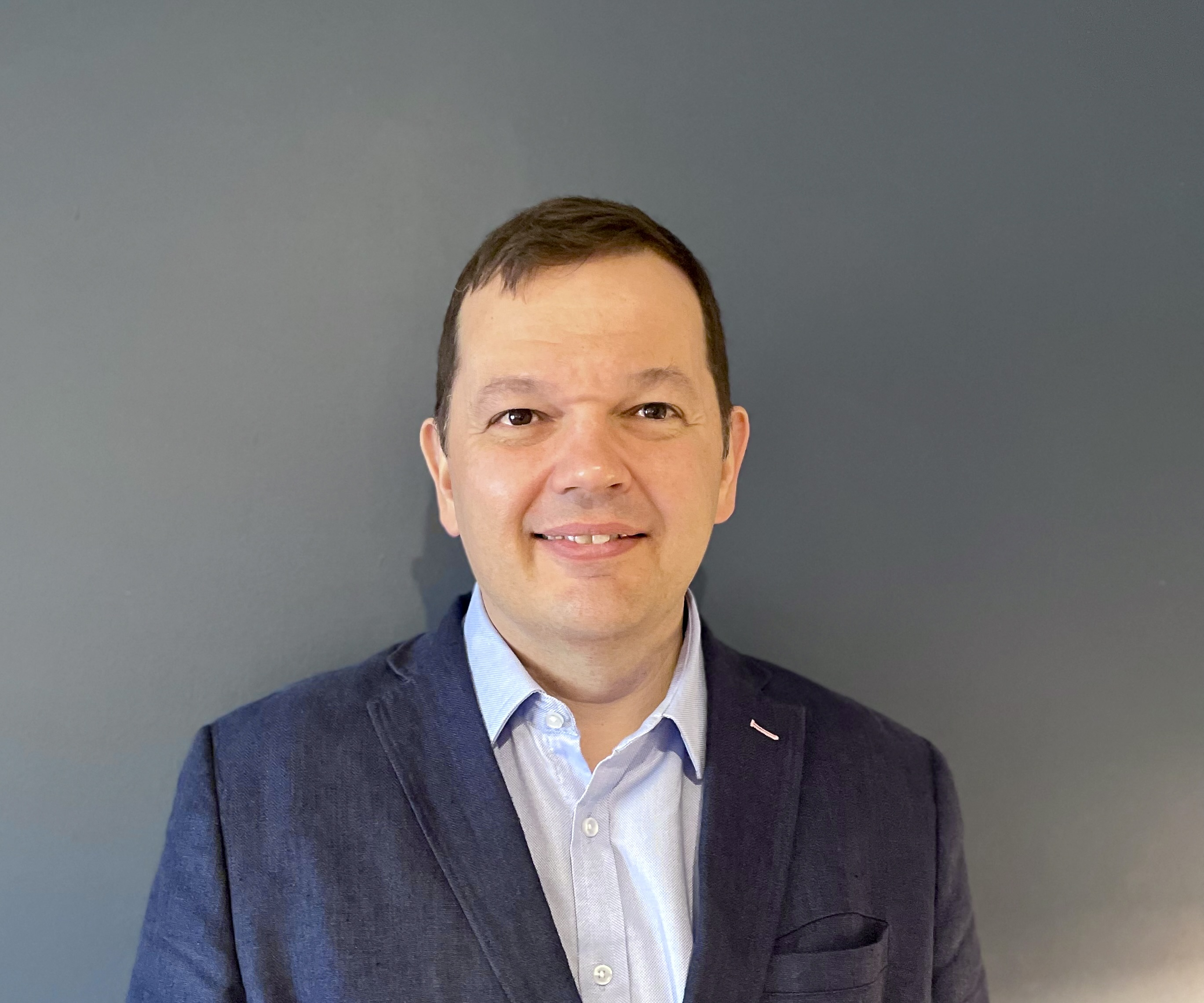
- McIntosh in 2022
- Born: 1971 (age 54–55); Aberdeen, England, United Kingdom
- Education: University of Aberdeen; University of Edinburgh
- Scientific career
- Fields: Biological Psychiatry; Genomics; Data Science

Andrew M. McIntosh (born 1971) is a UK academic psychiatrist. He is Professor of Biological Psychiatry at the University of Edinburgh,. The main focus of his research is using genomic and neuroimaging approaches to better understand the causes and causal consequences of Major Depressive Disorder.

== Education ==
He completed his undergraduate medical training MBChB at the University of Aberdeen and psychiatric training in Scotland at the Royal Edinburgh Hospital, before gaining MRCPsych in 2000. He has an MPhil (Psychiatry) and MD (Psychiatry, 2004) from the University of Edinburgh and a MSc in Applied Statistics. He has held MRC Clinical Training, Health Foundation/Academy of Medical Sciences Clinician Scientist and Scottish Funding Council Senior Clinical Fellowships.

== Career ==
McIntosh is Director of the UK Research and Innovation (UKRI) Mental Health Platform and co-chair of the Major Depressive Disorder Working Group of the Psychiatric Genomics Consortium with Cathryn Lewis. He is Chief Scientist of the Health Data Research UK Mental Health Hub and chair of the Generation Scotland Mental Health Expert Working Group and was founding Chair of the MQ Mental Health Data Science Group. McIntosh is a Wellcome Trust Investigator and is an investigator on many studies of depression, including DepGenAfrica.

He was elected a Fellow of the Royal Society of Edinburgh in 2021 and of the Academy of Medical Sciences the following year.

== Selected publications ==
- McIntosh, AM (2019). "Uncovering the Genetic Architecture of Major Depression". Neuron. 102 (1): 91–103. doi:10.1016/j.neuron.2019.03.022. PMC 6482287. PMID 30946830.
