= Uher =

Uher may refer to:

- Uher (village), a village in Poland
- Uher (brand), a German brand of electronic equipment

== People ==
- Karel Uher (born 1983), Czech curler
- Rudolf Uher, Canadian psychiatrist
- Štefan Uher (1930–1993), Slovak film director
