= Nigerian National Health Research Ethics Committee =

Ethics Federal committee on the national health research in Nigeria

National Health Research Ethnic Committee of Nigeria
- NHREC
- Incumbent
- Assumed office October 2015
- Leader: Clement Adebamowo

The National Health Research Ethics Committee of Nigeria (NHREC) is a national body advising the Nigerian Federal Ministry of Health, as well as State Ministries, on ethical issues concerning research. The NHREC is responsible for setting norms and standards for the conduct of human and animal research. For this purpose, it drafted the National Code for Health Research Ethics. It is also tasked with the registration and auditing of Nigerian health research ethics committees.

As of 12 August 2014, the NHREC chair is Clement Adebamowo.

== History ==
The NHREC was inaugurated in October 2005 by the Nigerian Minister of Health on presidential directives, as an offshoot of the Health Research Ethics Committee that had been in existence since the early 1980s.

Its Code of Health Research Ethics was approved by the National Council on Health in its 50th Annual Meeting in January 2007.

== Important statements ==
On 9 August 2014, the NHREC issued a statement on the use of experimental drugs during the 2014 West Africa Ebola virus outbreak. The statement further specified that administrative requirements normally limiting the international shipping of biological samples out of the country would be lifted for the duration of the outbreak.

In February 2015 Clement Adebamowo, the chairman of the committee stressed that considering real human and social factors was vital for stemming the Ebola outbreak: “Without appropriate and good quality community engagement, we may not succeed with our scientific interventions.”

== Inauguration of new committee ==
The federal government under the ministry of health on the 23rd of January 2024 inaugurate the new National Health Research Ethics Committee (NHREC) this was initiated by the Federal Government to oversee health research, ensuring its adherence to ethical standards as outlined in the Ministry of Health's four-point agenda on health issues and research that concern the ministry.

== See also ==
- Federal Ministries of Nigeria
- Health in Nigeria
