= Africa/Harvard School of Public Health Partnership for Cohort Research and Training =

Africa/HSPH PaCT
- Africa/HSPH PaCT African Sites and PIs: Dr. Clement Adebamowo, Institute of Human Virology in Nigeria; Dr. Francis Bajunirwe, Mbarara University, Uganda; Dr. David Guwattude, Makerere University, Uganda; Dr. Marina Njelekela, Muhimbili University, Tanzania; Dr. Jimmy Volmink, Stellenbosch University, South Africa
- Harvard Coordinating Site: Co-PIs; Dr. Michelle D. Holmes, Dr. Hans-Olov Adami; Research Scientists; Dr. Shona Dalal, Dr. Todd G. Reid; Program Co-ordinator; David Havelick
- Website: pactafrica.org

The Africa/Harvard School of Public Health Partnership for Cohort Research and Training (Africa/HSPH PaCT) launched in 2008, is a collaborative research project led by Principal Investigators Dr. Hans-Olov Adami and Dr. Michelle D. Holmes. Together with research scientists Dr. Shona Dalal and Dr. Todd G. Reid, this team represents the Harvard Coordinating Site of the Partnership with colleagues from five institutions in Nigeria, South Africa, Tanzania, and Uganda. The Africa/HSPH PaCT project plans on investigating the association of lifestyle factors and chronic disease risk in sub-Saharan Africa, through a large epidemiological cohort study that will include approximately 500,000 participants. Africa/HSPH PaCT is the first and largest cohort study conducted in sub-saharan Africa to employ mobile phone technology to follow participants and collect data. Africa/HSPH PaCT will also provide the infrastructure for capacity-building and for training a new generation of health professionals.

== Addressing the Chronic Disease Problem ==
In 1980’s New York City, patients began presenting to doctors with undiagnosed symptoms. Dr. Michelle D. Holmes, Co-Principal Investigator of Africa/HSPH PaCT, was among those witnessing the beginning of the AIDS pandemic. Today, a new pandemic of heart disease, mental illness, cancer, and diabetes affects Africa . Cohort studies survey thousands of people about their diet, exercise, smoking, and other habits, to guide prevention policies. Africa does not currently have such data; Africa/HSPH PaCT will be a first for this data collection.

== Research sites ==
The Principal Investigators and host institutions for the African sites are: Dr. Jimmy Volmink who is the Dean of the Faculty of Health Sciences at Stellenbosch University in South Africa; Dr. Clement Adebamowo at the Institute of Human Virology in Nigeria; Dr. David Guwattude at Makerere University in Kampala, Uganda and Dr. Francis Bajunirwe at Mbarara University in Mbarara, Uganda; and Dr. Marina Njelekela at Muhimbili University in Tanzania. Cohorts in South Africa and Tanzania will consist of school teachers, and health professionals will be recruited in Nigeria. Complementing these groups will be participants from peri-urban and rural locations in Uganda, in order to capture a wide variety of lifestyles and populations.

== Study aims ==
Africa/HSPH PaCT will investigate chronic non-communicable diseases (NCDs), namely cardiovascular disease, diabetes mellitus (DM), mental illness, breast and cervical cancers, which are on the rise in African countries. This research will provide a sound scientific basis for prevention of NCDs in Africa

Africa/HSPH PaCT will seek to:
- Better quantify the magnitude of NCDs
- Discover risk factors for NCDs in Africa and how they interact with the African genome
- Train a new generation of public health researchers and practitioners
- Pave the way for innovative methods of data collection employing the latest technology and techniques in computational social science
- Spur a wave of social entrepreneurism geared toward chronic disease management and public health prevention

== Pilot studies and data collection ==
Pilot studies, that capture the demographics, lifestyle factors, and chronic disease incidence have been started in all five African sites. This preliminary information collected from the pilot phase will guide and inform the next and larger phase of the initiative. A total of approximately 1500 participants have been enrolled in all five sites and followed for 6 months. In the Tanzania and South Africa sites, data was collected through a questionnaire. Face-to-face interviews were conducted in Kampala, Mbarara, and Nigeria. Blood samples were also collected in Mbarara and South Africa. A food-frequency questionnaire and follow-up questionnaires to measure incident NCDs were used to collect information in all five sites. Data from the pilot is currently being analyzed for publication

== Plan for enrollment and scale-up ==
At enrollment time, a uniform food frequency questionnaire that accommodates the wide range of dietary patterns across sub-Saharan Africa will be administered. Prof. Walter Willett, Chair of the Nutrition Department at HSPH and Principal Investigator of the Nurses' Health Study, played a crucial role in developing this questionnaire. The baseline measurement covers a large range of lifestyle factors including, but not limited to, measures of stress, socioeconomic circumstances, education, reproductive factors (among women), physical activity, smoking and alcohol use, healthcare utilization, and anthropometric measures. Approximately 500,000 study participants from the five African sites will be enrolled over a five-year period and the timeline as follows:

Year 1 : Hiring and training of personnel, development of questionnaire (including translation to and back-translation from the relevant languages), establishment of IT infrastructure, preparation of the biobank with blood samples, and definition of source population
Years 2 & 3 : Enrollment of 20,000 cohort participants per site, for a total of 100,000
Year 4 & 5 : Follow-up, ascertainment and validation of outcomes, optimization of procedures for retention and compliance, and analyses of cross-sectional data. Cleaning databases, analyzing data, and preparing manuscripts based on the follow-up data

== Mobile phones ==
A major part of Africa/HSPH PaCT's innovation is research on cell phone use in scientific studies in Africa. Mobile phones offer entirely new opportunities for cost-effective, large-scale longitudinal studies. Africa/HSPH PaCT is the first study to rely strongly on mobile phones for enrollment, retention, and follow-up and will work in close collaboration with the Human Dynamics Group of the Pentland Lab (MediaLab, Massachusetts Institute of Technology) who are leaders in the field of mobile phone data analytics and computational social science.

== Plans for expansion ==
The Africa/HSPH PaCT group is currently exploring collaborations with other research groups that are also in the beginning stages of creating large-scale cohort studies. In October 2010, the first-ever World Cohort Integration Workshop, hosted by Dr. Hans-Olov Adami was held in Hydra, Greece. This gathering brought together researchers from Mexico (EsMaestra, Mexican Teachers' Cohort), India (Barshi Cohort), Sweden (LifeGene Sweden), Iceland (University of Iceland), and the United States and four countries in Africa (Africa/HSPH PaCT). The main purpose of this workshop was to share best practices as well as lessons learned and also to pave the way for sharing data, resources, and ideas in the long-term among cohort studies. Combined data from these groups will represent over two million study participants. Africa/HSPH PaCT is also exploring how best to pair up this large and unique cohort study with partners to create a cadre of social entrepreneurs to help spawn public health innovations in sub-Saharan Africa. Africa/HSPH PaCT currently supports one such social entrepreneurial venture, the ImpacTree project, that is an innovative public social platform for individuals to make their own impact on important issues in the developing world
