= Three Million African Genomes =

Three Million African Genomes (3MAG)
- Location: South Africa
- Founder: Ambroise Wonkam
- Country: South Africa

Three Million African Genomes (3MAG) is a human genetics project inaugurated by Ambroise Wonkam of Cape Town University in South Africa. The project's aim is to correct for the systemic shortfall in the collection and analysis of genomic data of Africans, who have the widest genetic variation among human populations, via sequencing to capture "the full scope of variation to improve health care, equity and medical research globally". Three million is the initial rough estimate of the sample size required to capture the variation. The project was conceived by Professor Ambroise Wonkam, director of Genetic Medicine of African Populations (GeneMAP) at UCT. Wonkam argues that African genomes contain variants not captured in existing reference genomes, which have predominantly focused on European and Asian populations. A more representative genome, he suggests, could enhance understanding of health and disease globally, given that all humans originated in Africa. The project is also intended to promote equity in medical research and health outcomes for African populations

== Scope ==
The 3MAG project plans to sequence genomes from diverse ethnolinguistic and geographic groups across Africa. Initial efforts will leverage datasets from previous projects, such as the Human Heredity and Health in Africa (H3Africa) consortium, the UK Biobank, and the Trans-Omics for Precision Medicine (TOPMed) program. Principal component analysis will be used to determine population clusters and guide sampling. The estimated cost is approximately $450 million per year over a decade, starting with 300,000 genomes in the first year.
