= Magdalena Skipper =

Editor-in-Chief of Nature

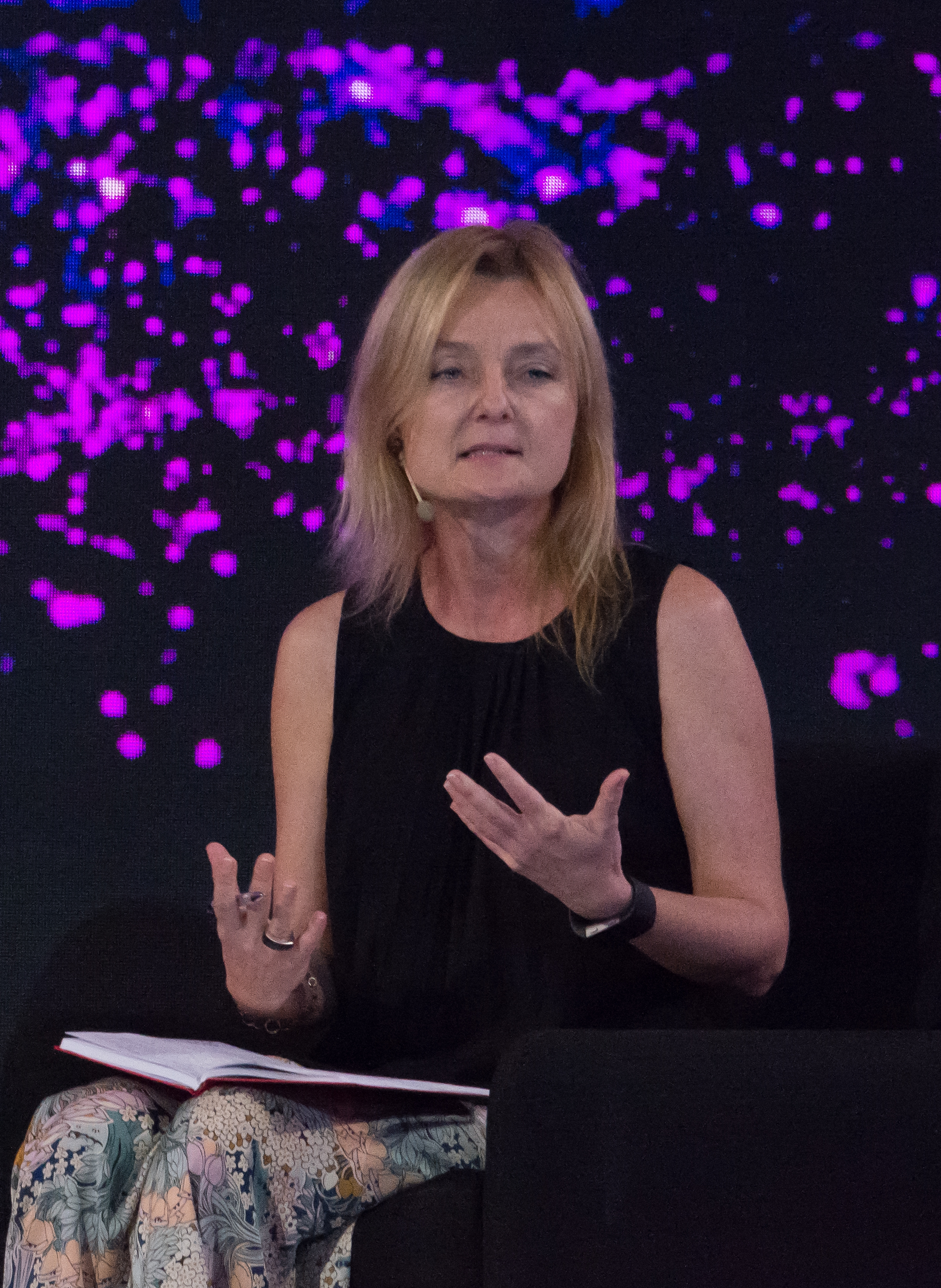
- Skipper speaking at Congreso Futuro in 2019
- Education: University of Nottingham (BSc); University of Cambridge (PhD)
- Scientific career
- Workplaces: Nature; Springer Nature; Laboratory of Molecular Biology; University of Cambridge; Imperial Cancer Research Fund
- Thesis: Primary sex determination mechanisms in Caenorhabditis elegans (1998)
- Academic advisors: Jonathan Hodgkin

Magdalena Skipper is a British geneticist and editor-in-chief of the journal Nature. She previously served as an editor of Nature Reviews Genetics and the open access journal Nature Communications.

== Education ==
Skipper obtained a bachelor's degree in genetics at the University of Nottingham. She completed her PhD in 1998 at the University of Cambridge, where she worked in Jonathan Hodgkin's lab investigating sex-determination systems in the nematode worm Caenorhabditis elegans. She is a member of Corpus Christi College, Cambridge.

== Career and research ==
After completing her PhD she joined the Medical Research Council (MRC) Laboratory of Molecular Biology (LMB) at the University of Cambridge. She briefly worked as a postdoctoral fellow at the Imperial Cancer Research Fund, working on the notch signaling pathway of zebrafish in gut development.

Skipper joined Nature in 2001 as an associate editor for Nature Reviews Genetics. During her editorship she interviewed several high-profile scientists including Anne McLaren, Mario Capecchi and Oliver Smithies. In 2002 she was appointed chief editor of Nature Reviews Genetics, and was promoted to associate publisher in 2008. Skipper worked briefly as Director for Scientific Communications at the Altius Institute for Biomedical Sciences in Seattle.

In 2018 she worked with Nature and Estée Lauder Companies to launch a global award for women in science. She became the first woman editor-in-chief of Nature in its 150-year history in May 2018, when she succeeded Philip Campbell. She has stated that she intends to ensure that science is reproducible and robust, as well as doing more to support early-career researchers.

In 2019 the University of Nottingham, where she had taken her first degree, awarded her an honorary Doctor of Science.

Alongside her editorial work, Skipper has taken on a number of advisory and governance roles in the international research community. She sits on the external advisory board of the Centre for Personalised Medicine at the University of Oxford, and is a member of the Strategic Council for Research Excellence, Integrity, and Trust, a multi-stakeholder body convened by the National Academies of Sciences, Engineering, and Medicine in 2021 to address the integrity, ethics and trustworthiness of the research enterprise. She has served on the International Science Council's Global Commission on Science Missions for Sustainability, and became a Foundation Fellow of the council in June 2022. In April 2025 she was appointed to the board of directors of the Geneva Science and Diplomacy Anticipator (GESDA), a Swiss foundation promoting science diplomacy, having contributed to its working groups since 2023.

Preceded by Philip Campbell	Editor in Chief of Nature; 2018–present	Incumbent
