= Neo-colonial science =

Misconduct by Western researchers who do not collaborate with local experts

Neo-colonial research or neo-colonial science, frequently described as helicopter research, parachute science or research, parasitic research, or safari study, is when researchers from wealthier countries go to a developing country, collect information, travel back to their country, analyze the data and samples, and publish the results with little or no involvement of local researchers. A 2003 study by the Hungarian Academy of Sciences found that 70% of articles in a random sample of publications about least-developed countries did not include a local research co-author.

Frequently, during this kind of research, the local colleagues might be used to provide logistics support as fixers but are not engaged for their expertise or given credit for their participation in the research. Scientific publications resulting from parachute science frequently only contribute to the career of the scientists from rich countries, thus limiting the development of local science capacity (such as funded research centers) and the careers of local scientists. This form of "colonial" science has reverberations of 19th century scientific practices of treating non-Western participants as "others" in order to advance colonialism—and critics call for the end of these extractivist practices in order to decolonize knowledge.

This kind of research approach reduces the quality of research because international researchers may not ask the right questions or draw connections to local issues. The result of this approach is that local communities are unable to leverage the research to their own advantage. Ultimately, especially for fields dealing with global issues like conservation biology which rely on local communities to implement solutions, neo-colonial science prevents institutionalization of the findings in local communities in order to address issues being studied by scientists.

== Effects ==
The use of helicopter research has also led to a stigma of research within minority groups; some going so far as to deny research within their communities. Such safari studies lead to long-term negative effects for the scientific community and researchers, as distrust develops within peripheral communities.

=== Donor robbery ===
Funds for research in developing countries are often provided by bilateral and international academic and research programmes for sustainable development. Through 'donor robbery' a large proportion of such international funds may end up in the wealthier countries via consultancy fees, laboratory costs in rich universities, overhead or purchase of expensive equipment, hiring expatriates and running "enclave" research institutes, depending on international conglomerates.

=== Use of open data ===
The current tendency of freely availing research datasets may lead to exploitation of, and rapid publication of results based on data pertaining to developing countries by rich and well-equipped research institutes, without any further involvement and/or benefit to local communities; similarly to the historical open access to tropical forests that has led to the disappropriation ("Global Pillage") of plant genetic resources from developing countries.

=== Professional discourse ===
In certain fields of research, such as global public health, both the journals and professionals creating the field have defined much of their work under colonial structures and assumptions. This in turn prevents participation in the field from early in the process, even before authorship or credit is given during the publishing representation of editorial boards of journals publishing in environmental sciences and public health, with a vast majority of editors based in high-income countries despite the global scope of the journals' fields.

== Mitigation ==
Some journals and publishers are implementing policies that should mitigate the impact of parachute science. One of the conditions for publication set by the journal Global Health Action is that, "Articles reporting research involving primary data collection will normally include researchers and institutions from the countries concerned as authors, and include in-country ethical approval." Similarly The Lancet Global Health placed restriction encouraged submissions to review their practices for including local participants. Similarly in 2021, PLOS announced a policy that required changes in reporting for researchers working in other countries.

A number of research communities are putting protocols in place for indigenous health information. In the US, the Cherokee Nation established a specific Institutional Review Board, aiming at ensuring the protection of the rights and welfare of tribal members involved in research projects. The Cherokee Nation IRB does not allow helicopter research. The Human Heredity and Health in Africa (H3Africa) Initiative launched guidelines for working with genetic information from the continent in 2018.

An Ethiopian soil scientist, Mitiku Haile, suggests that such "free riding" should be "condemned by all partners and, if found, should be brought to the attention of the scientific community and the international and national funding agencies".

Also in Africa, since the outbreak of the coronavirus pandemic in 2020, travel restrictions on international scholars tend to local scientists stepping up to lead research.

== Examples by field ==
Examples of neo-colonial approaches to science include:

- In the medical world: "A popular term for a clinical or epidemiologic research project conducted by foreign scientists who use local contacts to gain access to a population group and obtain samples"
- In anthropology, particularly when related to peripheral ethnic groups: "Any investigation within the community in which a researcher collects data, leaves to disseminate it, and never again has contact with the tribe."
- In geosciences, a 2020 study found that 30% of studies about Africa contained an African author. (See also: Ubirajara jubatus.)
- When scientists from a central, dominant ethnic or sociological group conduct research in areas where minority groups are living (often peripheral areas), there is also a risk for helicopter research, though it may not appear directly from the academic affiliation of the researchers. For instance, within the United States, it has been used primarily in the study of Native Americans.

=== Climate change ===
An analysis of research money from 1990 to 2020 for climate change, found that 78% of research money for research on Climate change in Africa, was spent in European and North American institutions and more was spent for former British colonies than other countries. This in turn both prevents local researchers from doing groundbreaking work, because they don't have the funding for experimental activities and reduces investment in local researchers ideas and in topics important to the Global South, such as climate change adaptation.

=== Soil science ===
Soil scientists have qualified helicopter research as a perpetuation of "colonial" science. Typically researchers from rich countries would come to establish soil profile pits or collect soil and peat samples, which is often more easily done in poor countries given the availability of cheap labour and goodwill of villagers to dig a pit on their land against small payment. The profile will be described and samples taken with the help of local people, possibly also university staff. In case of helicopter research, the outcomes are then published such as discovery in tropical peatlands, sometimes in high-level journals without the involvement of local colleagues. "Overall, helicopter research tends to produce academic papers that further the career of scientists from developed countries, but provide little practical outcomes for nations where the studies are conducted, nor develop the careers of their local scientists."

=== Coral Reef research ===
A 2021 study in Current Biology quantified the amount of parachute research happening in coral reef studies and found such approaches to be the norm.

== Examples by region ==
=== Europe ===
The 2015 description of Tetrapodophis was performed by three European scientists. When the Brazilian newspaper Estadão – Brazil being the country where the fossil hails from – questioned lead researcher David M. Martill, he replied "It should be fossils for all. No countries existed when the animals were fossilized. [..] what difference would it make [partnering with Brazilian scientists]? I mean, do you want me also to have a black person on the team for ethnicity reasons, and a cripple and a woman, and maybe a homosexual too, just for a bit of all round balance? [..] Now I don't work in Brazil. But I still work on Brazilian fossils. There are hundreds of them in museums all over Europe, America and in Japan."

=== Central Africa ===
A 2009 study found that Europeans participated in 77% of regionally co-authored papers in Central African countries. Even though local authors are credited with the work, they aren't always given participatory roles in the final production of the research itself—instead playing roles in fieldwork.

=== Indonesia ===
In April 2018, a publication about Indonesia's Bajau people received great attention. These "sea nomads" had a genetic adaptation resulting in large spleens that supply additional oxygenated red blood cells. A month later this publication was criticised by Indonesian scientists. Their article in Science questioned the ethics of scientists from the United States and Denmark who took DNA samples of the Bajau people and analyzed them, without much involvement of Bajau or other Indonesian people.

== See also ==
- Academic dishonesty
- Bioethics
- Biopiracy
- Bullying in academia
- Committee on Publication Ethics
- Conflicts of interest in academic publishing
- Research ethics
- Research integrity
- Scientific method
