= Ambroise Wonkam =

Cameroonian physician

- Born: Yaoundé, Cameroon
- Occupations: doctor and professor

Academic background
- Education: University of Yaoundé I University of Geneva
- Thesis: Burden of sickle cell disease and prenatal genetic diagnosis in Cameroon

Academic work
- Discipline: medical genetics
- Institutions: University of Cape Town
- Main interests: sickle cell disease; congenital hearing impairment; ethics in human genetics
- Notable works: Three Million African Genomes project

Ambroise Wonkam is a Cameroonian medical doctor and professor of medical genetics at Johns Hopkins School of Medicine. His research is in sickle cell disease, the genetics of congenital hearing impairment, and ethics in human genetics. He is the current president of the African Society of Human Genetics.

== Biography ==
=== Education ===
Ambroise Wonkam was born in Yaoundé, Cameroon. He studied at the Faculty of Medicine and Biomedical Sciences of the University of Yaoundé I, where he received his MD in 1995. In 1997, he went to the University of Geneva to train in cell biology before specializing in medical genetics. He received his doctorate in Medical Sciences in the Department of Morphology on the topic Burden of sickle cell disease and prenatal genetic diagnosis in Cameroon (French: Fardeau de la drépanocytose et diagnostic génétique prénatal au Cameroun ).

=== Career ===
Wonkam is a medical practitioner in African and European countries. He joined the University of Cape Town as faculty in 2009, where he studied sickle cell disease and why its severity and mortality varied between individuals. He became professor of medical genetics at the Faculty of Medicine where he was the deputy dean of research and director of the Genetic Medicine of African Populations (GeneMAP) program, which he founded in 2017. He became president of the African Society of Human Genetics in 2019. In 2021, he was named director of genetics at the Johns Hopkins School of Medicine.

Wonkam is spearheading the Three Million African Genomes project, which aims to sequence the DNA of three million Africans in order to make up for systemic shortfalls in the study of the human genetic diversity of Africans. He has proposed that the project be funded by African countries. In 2022, he was a guest editor for special issues of Nature calling for the decolonization and elimination of racism in science.

== Distinctions ==
- Prix Denber-Pinard (2003) for best thesis, University of Geneva Faculty of Medicine
- Clinical Genetics Society International Award (2014), British Society of Genetic Medicine
- Alan Pifer Award (2021), University of Cape Town
