= Clement Adebamowo =

Nigerian medical researcher

- Born: Lagos, Nigeria
- Education: University of Jos, Nigeria
- Known for: Work on non-communicable diseases epidemiology and AIDS-associated malignancies
- Scientific career
- Fields: Epidemiology
- Workplaces: Institute of Human Virology, West African College of Surgeons

Clement Adebamowo is a Nigerian academic, epidemologist, medical and public health researcher. He is a professor of Epidemiology and Public Health who currently serves as Director of Global Health Cancer Research at the University of Maryland School of Medicine.

He is known for his research work in cancer epidemiology, nutrition, epidemiology, and research ethics, particularly in low resource and under-served in Africa.

== Education ==
Adebamowo graduated from the University of Jos, Nigeria, having earned BM ChB Hons and a distinction at every examination. He trained in Surgery and Oncology at University College, Ibadan, Nigeria, and studied epidemiology and biostatistics at Harvard University, where he earned a Doctor of Science (ScD).

== Scientific work ==
Adebamowo has published more than 80 scientific articles. His research interests are non-communicable disease epidemiology, cancer epidemiology, AIDS-associated malignancies, and Bioethics.

He worked on community engagement and sample collection as part of the International HapMap Project, and, along with Charles Rotimi, is one of the principal investigators responsible for the HapMap and 1000 Genomes Project work with the "Yoruba in Ibadan, Nigeria" population.

== Positions held ==
In addition to his role as professor of epidemiology & public health and director for global health cancer research at the University of Maryland, Baltimore. Adebamowo holds a number of journal editorships. He is editor in chief of Bioethics Online Journal (BeOnline), as well as of Cancer in Africa Online Journal (CIAO), and associate editor of Frontiers in Oncology.

He is also:

- President of the Society of Oncology and Cancer Research of Nigeria
- Director of the Center for Bioethics, Nigeria
- Director of the West African Framework Program on Global Health
- Chair of the International Affairs Committee of the American Society of Clinical Oncology
- Country PI of Africa/Harvard School of Public Health Partnership for Cohort Research and Training
- Senior Research Fellow, International Prevention Research Institute
- Director of Office of Strategic Information, Research and Training, Institute of Human Virology, Nigeria
- Chairman of the National Health Research Ethics Committee of Nigeria

== Awards and honors ==
Adebamowo holds a number of honors and memberships in societies:

- Fellow of the West African College of Surgeons
- Fellow of the American College of Surgeons
- Convener of the Nigerian Research Consortium
- Fellow of the American Society of Clinical Oncology (ASCO)
- Honorary Professor, University of Dundee, UK
- Member of the Expert Advisory Panel on Clinical Practice Guidelines and Research Methods and Ethics of the World Health Organization (WHO)
