= Philip Campbell (scientist) =

British astrophysicist

Sir Philip Campbell FRS FRAS FInstP
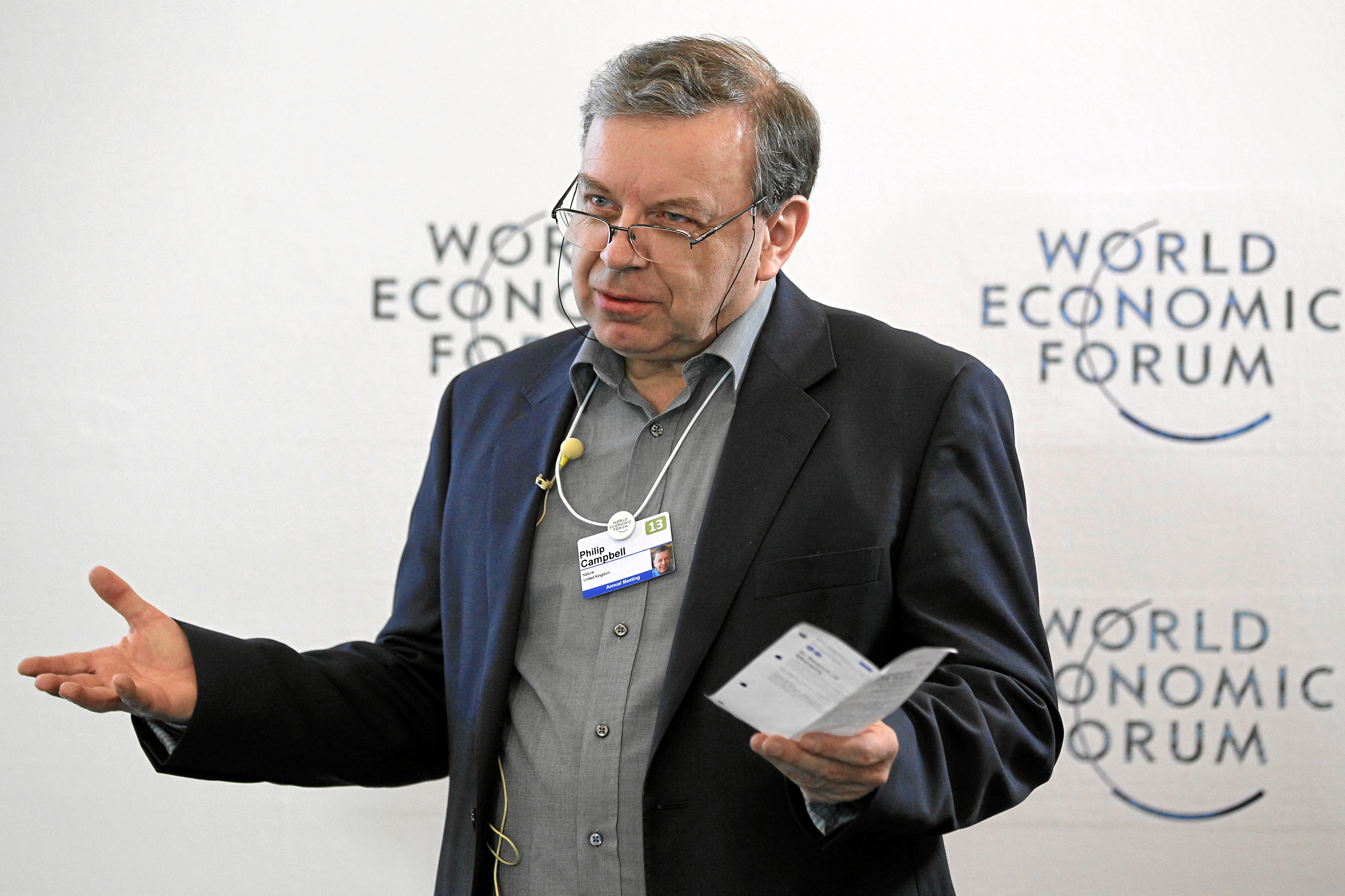
- Philip Campbell speaking at the World Economic Forum in Davos in 2013
- Born: Philip Henry Montgomery Campbell; 19 April 1951 (age 75)
- Education: Shrewsbury School; University of Bristol (BSc); Queen Mary College, University of London (MSc); University of Leicester (PhD)
- Known for: Editor-in-Chief of Nature
- Scientific career
- Fields: Physics; Science policy
- Workplaces: Nature; Physics World; Springer Nature; Nature Publishing Group
- Thesis: The influence of the ionosphere on low frequency radio wave propagation (1979)
- Doctoral advisor: Tudor Jones
- Website: nature.com/nature/about/editors/

Sir Philip Henry Montgomery Campbell (born 19 April 1951) is a British astrophysicist. He worked as editor-in-chief of the peer reviewed scientific journal Nature from 1995 to 2018. From 2018 he was the Editor-in-Chief of the publishing company Springer Nature until his retirement in May 2023.

== Early life and education ==
Campbell was born on 19 April 1951 and educated at Shrewsbury School. He went on to study aeronautical engineering at the University of Bristol, graduating with a Bachelor of Science (BSc) degree in 1972. He then gained a Master of Science (MSc) degree in astrophysics at Queen Mary College, University of London before doing his PhD in upper atmospheric physics at the University of Leicester supervised by Tudor Jones while collaborating with the Royal Aircraft Establishment. His doctoral and postdoctoral research was on the physics of the ionized upper atmosphere and effects on radio propagation, using the latter as a probe of the lower ionosphere.

== Career ==
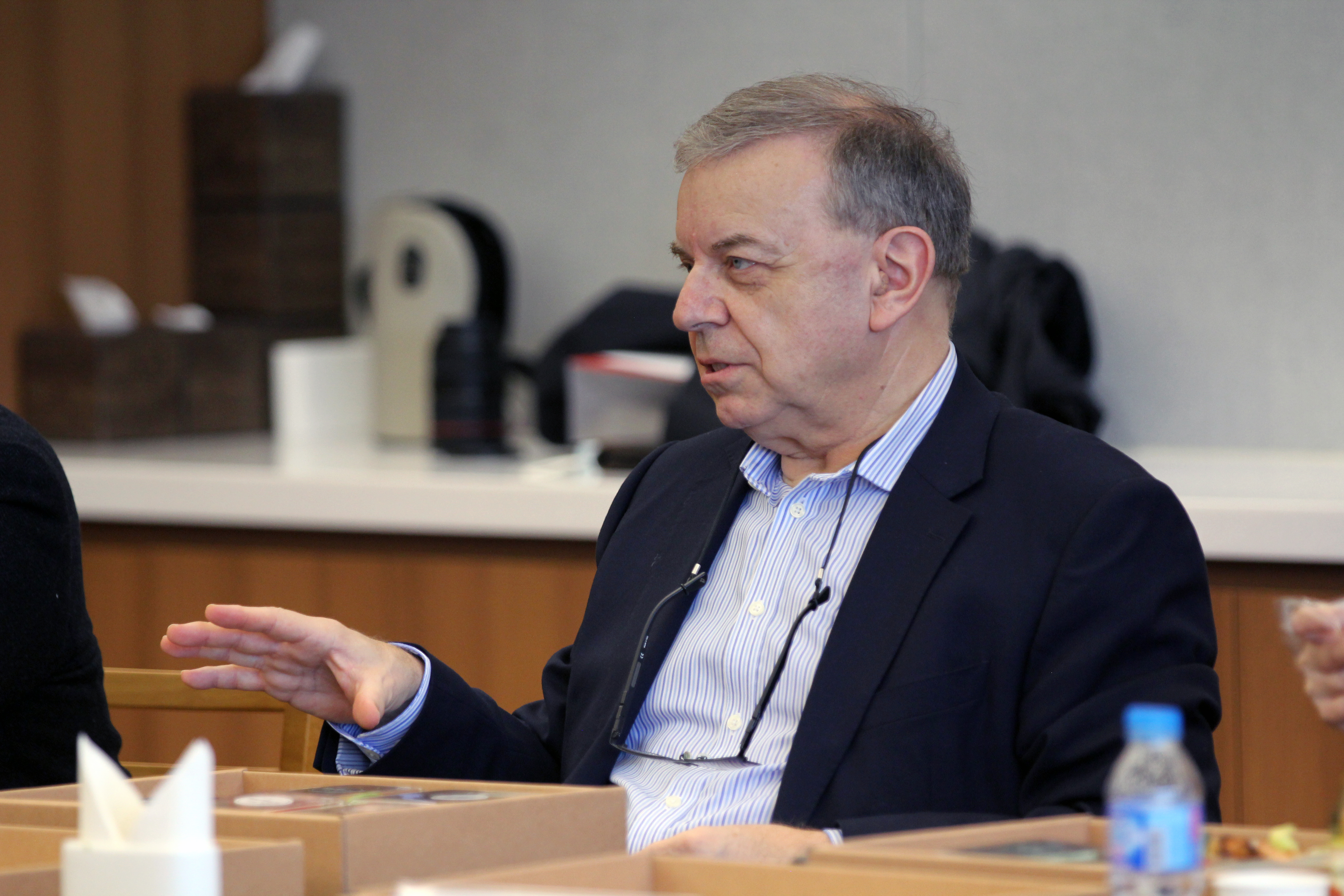
Philip Campbell gives a talk during a visit to Korea.

Campbell began working at Nature in 1979 and was appointed physical sciences editor in 1982. After leaving the journal in 1988 to start the publication Physics World, the membership magazine of the Institute of Physics, he returned to Nature as Editor-in-Chief in 1995, succeeding John Maddox. In that role, he headed a team of about 90 editorial staff around the world. He took direct editorial responsibility for the content of Nature's editorials, writing some of them. He was the seventh editor-in-chief since the journal was launched in 1869. He was also editor-in-chief of Nature publications. In that role he was responsible for ensuring that the quality and integrity appropriate to the Nature name are maintained, for overseeing editorial policies, and for ensuring that appropriate individuals are appointed as chief editors of Nature journals. He was succeeded by Magdalena Skipper in his role as editor-in-chief in 2018.

In the role of Editor-in-Chief of Springer Nature, Campbell was responsible for the oversight of editorial policies and standards across the company, for external engagement, and for stimulating new strands of content across the company's brands and across research disciplines.

Campbell has worked on issues relating to science and its impacts in society with the Office of Science and Innovation in the UK, the European Commission and the U.S. National Institutes of Health. For ten years until 2012, he was a trustee of the charity Cancer Research UK and the chairman of the charity's Public Policy Advisory Group. He was a visiting scholar at Rockefeller University in spring 2008.

Campbell was appointed a member of an independent panel established in February 2010 by the University of East Anglia to investigate the controversy surrounding the publication of emails sent by staff at the university's Climatic Research Unit (CRU). Due to publicity about a 2009 interview with Chinese State Radio during which he expressed support for the CRU scientists, he resigned just hours after the panel was launched.

Campbell was a founding member and, from 2015 to 2019, chair of the board of trustees of the research-funding charity MQ: Transforming Mental Health. He was a member of the World Economic Forum's Global Agenda Council on Mental Health.

As well as editing, Campbell has co-authored several publications on science policy and the impact factor.

=== Awards and honours ===
Campbell was elected a Fellow of the Royal Astronomical Society (FRAS) in 1979 and a Fellow of the Institute of Physics (FInstP) in 1995. In 1999, he was awarded an honorary Doctor of Science degree by the University of Leicester, an honorary Doctor of Science by the University of Bristol in 2008, and an honorary fellowship of Queen Mary, University of London, in 2009. He was also elected an Honorary Fellow of Clare Hall, Cambridge.

In the 2015 Birthday Honours, he was appointed Knight Bachelor for services to Science. He has been an Honorary Professor Peking Union Medical College since 2009. In 2019, he was given the Lifetime Achievement Award of the Association of British Science Writers. He was elected a Fellow of the Royal Society in 2024.

== Personal life ==
In January 2010 he was a guest on Private Passions, the biographical music discussion programme on BBC Radio 3.

Preceded by John Maddox (1980–1995)	Editor in Chief of Nature; 1995–2018	Succeeded by Magdalena Skipper (2018– )
