= MQ: Transforming Mental Health =

Mental-health research charity

- Formation: 2013
- Type: Medical Research
- Purpose: Mental Health Research
- Location: London, England
- Chair: Sir Philip Campbell
- Website: www.mqmentalhealth.org

MQ: Transforming Mental Health is a London-based charity founded in 2013, with initial funding from the Wellcome Trust, to raise funds from the general public for research. The charity is based in the UK, but it has an international focus and funds research globally.

The label "MQ" riffs on the concepts of Intelligence quotient (IQ) and Emotional quotient (EQ) – compare MHQ (Mental Health Quotient).

== Purpose ==
The charity's goal is to create a world where mental illnesses are understood, effectively treated and made preventable. It funds multi-disciplinary research into mental health relating to biological, psychological, and social sciences.

== Research ==
MQ's research programme focuses on four specific areas: supporting future generations, improving current treatments, promoting research leadership and utilising mental health data.

The MQ fellows award provides successful applicants with up to £225,000 over three years to support research that explores new ways to understand, treat or prevent mental illness. 20 people have so far been selected for 2017, 2016, 2015, 2014, and 2013.

A large international scientific meeting that is dedicated to mental health science is organised through the charity. It has been running annually every February since 2014.

== Executives ==
The CEO of MQ is Lea Milligan, formerly the executive director of Mercy Ships UK. He took up the post in June 2020.

MQ's chair is Shahzad Malik, general partner of Advent Life Sciences. He took over from Sir Philip Campbell, the editor-in-chief of Nature.
