= SoulCollage =

Method of self-discovery (created 1986–1989)

SoulCollage is a method of self-discovery through the creation and intuitive analysis of a deck of collaged cards. It was developed by Seena B. Frost, M.A., M.Div. Frost created SoulCollage, then called "Neter cards", while studying under Jean Houston from 1986 to 1989, and further developed it in her private practice of psychotherapy. In 2001, Hanford Mead published her book about the method, SoulCollage: An Intuitive Collage Process for Individuals and Groups. A subsequent book on the subject, SoulCollage Evolving: An Intuitive Collage Process for Self-Discovery and Community (2010) won a Nautilus Book Award for Personal Development / Psychotherapy. Cards are made by tearing or clipping images (often from magazines) and then combining them, perhaps against a new background image, into a collage. All cards in one's deck should be the same size, generally 5x8 inches. A prototypical SoulCollage deck consists of four suits:

- The Committee Suit is made up of images representing the different voices that constitute one's own personality.
- The Community Suit cards represent influences upon oneself, whether friends, family, pets, historical figures one emulates, or even very special places.
- The Companions Suit consists of the animal guides inhabiting one's chakras.
- The Council Suit consists of Jungian archetypes important in one's own journey.

Committee and Council cards are often made quickly and intuitively, while Community and Companion cards may be put together more deliberately. There are two primary uses of the cards: the IAOW exercise, and card readings. There is great value in doing these exercises in community with others, but only a card's creator is authorized to speak from it. IAOW stands for "I am One Who." The card's creator speaks from the point of view of the card, beginning "I am one who..." and perhaps including statements beginning with "What I want to say to you is..." and "My gift to you is..." Card readings are never done by a third party, but always by the creator of the cards to answer a question about hir own life. A question is formulated and then a number of cards (typically four, one from each suit) are drawn. In this way, a person taps into hir inner wisdom (rather than, say, magic) to address hir question. There are also three Transpersonal cards, which are not read from (are not chosen in readings), but which are displayed during readings as reminders of Divine Mystery. These cards are the Source (Divine Spirit), SoulEssence (corresponding to what many would call the soul) and Witness (one's own "stepped-back" consciousness). SoulCollage is a non-competitive process, in which the meaning of a card is valued more than its aesthetics. "SoulCollage does not advocate copying or infringing on the copyrighted work of others in any way. SoulCollage cards are made for personal use," not for sale or trade.
