= Iiris Hovatta =

Finnish geneticist and neuroscientist

Iiris Hovatta (born 31 December 1970 in Espoo, Finland) is a Finnish geneticist and neuroscientist, specializing in genetics, genomics, behavioral neuroscience, and biological psychiatry. She is professor of behavioral genetics at the University of Helsinki, Finland.

== Education and career ==
Hovatta obtained her MSc in genetics from the University of Helsinki, Faculty of Biosciences, in 1994, under the supervision of Leena Peltonen-Palotie. She completed her PhD in medical genetics at the University of Helsinki, Faculty of Medicine, in 1998, with a thesis entitled "Molecular Genetics of Familial Schizophrenia and PLO-SL," supervised by Leena Peltonen-Palotie and Jouko Lönnqvist. In 2006, she earned the title of docent in medical molecular biology at the University of Helsinki.

From 2017 she held the position of associate professor in neurogenomics at the Faculty of Biological and Environmental Sciences, University of Helsinki, becoming a full professor of behavioral genetics in the Department of Psychology and Logopedics at the Faculty of Medicine in 2018.

She currently serves as a councilor on the Executive Committee o the European College of Neuropsychopharmacology (ECNP) for the 2022-2025 term, and was a member of the Scientific Program Committee of the 35th ECNP Congress 2022.
