= Clinical Genetics (journal) =

- Discipline: Human genetics
- Language: English
- Edited by: Reiner A. Veitia

Publication details
- History: 1970–present
- Publisher: Wiley-Blackwell
- Frequency: Monthly
- Impact factor: 4.104 (2018)

Standard abbreviations
- ISO 4: Clin. Genet.

Indexing
- CODEN: CLGNAY
- ISSN: 0009-9163 (print); 1399-0004 (web)
- OCLC no.: 01554932

Links
- Journal homepage; Online access; Online archive

Clinical Genetics is a monthly peer-reviewed medical journal covering medical genetics. It was established in 1970 and is published by Wiley-Blackwell. The editor-in-chief is Reiner A. Veitia (University of Paris).

== Abstracting and indexing ==
The journal is abstracted and indexed in:

- Abstracts in Anthropology
- EBSCO databases
- Elsevier BIOBASE
- Biological Abstracts
- BIOSIS Previews
- CAB Abstracts
- CAB Global Health
- Chemical Abstracts Service
- CSA Biological Sciences Database
- Current Contents/Clinical Medicine
- EMBASE/Excerpta Medica
- Embiology
- International Bibliographic Information on Dietary Supplements
- Index Medicus/MEDLINE
- InfoTrac
- MEDLINE/PubMed
- ProQuest
- Science Citation Index

According to the Journal Citation Reports, its 2018 impact factor is 4.104.
