= Georgia M. Dunston =

American geneticist

Georgia Mae Dunston
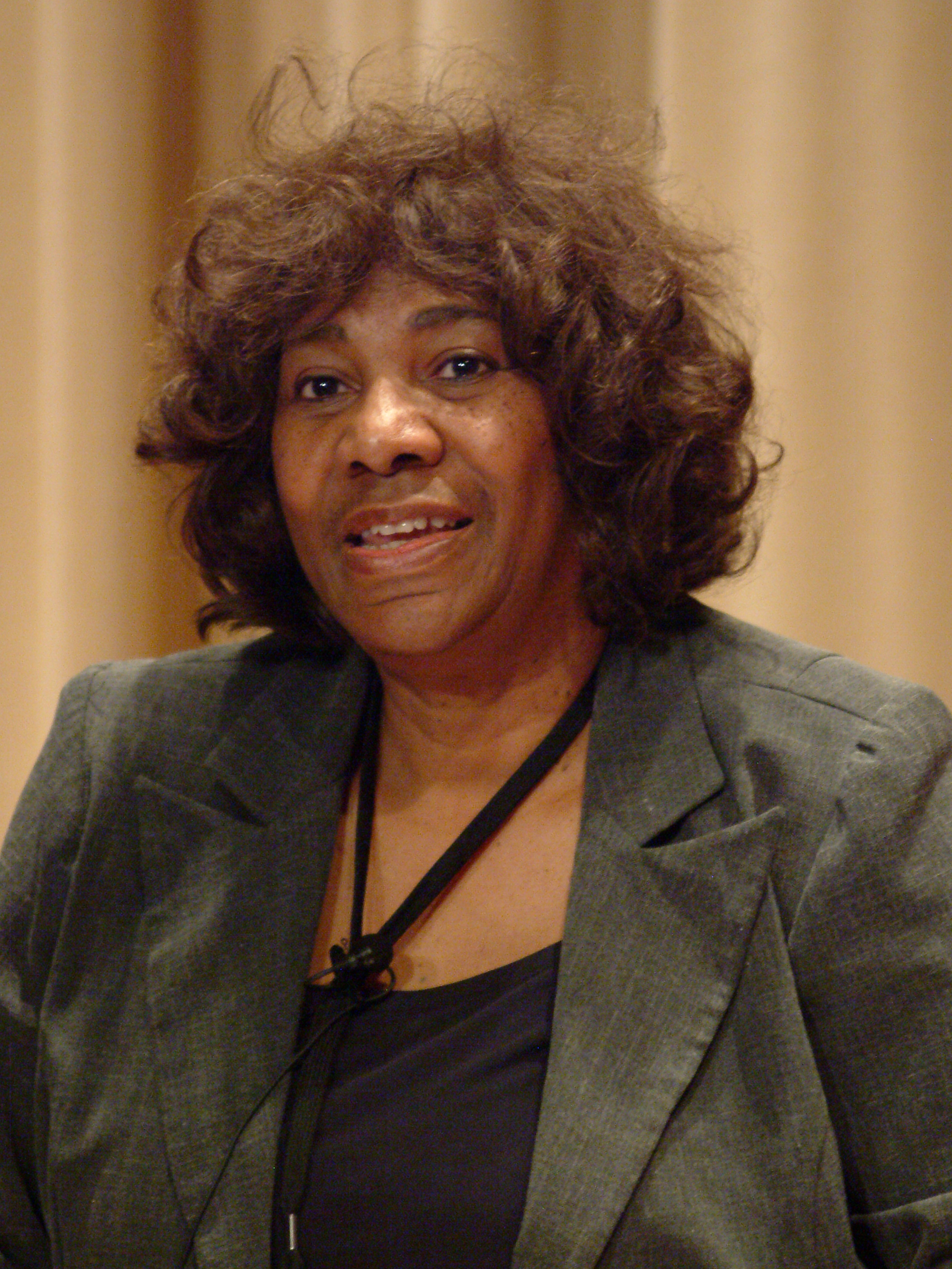
- Dunston in 2008
- Born: August 4th 1944; Norfolk, Virginia U.S.
- Education: Norfolk State University (1965); Tuskegee University (1967); University of Michigan (1972)
- Scientific career
- Fields: Human Genetics
- Workplaces: Howard University; National Cancer Institute
- Thesis: Immunogenetic studies of the XH system of human serum alpha-globulin (1973)
- Doctoral advisor: H. Gershowitz

Georgia Mae Dunston (born August 4, 1944) is an American geneticist who is professor of human immunogenetics at Howard University and founding director of the National Human Genome Center at Howard University.

== Early life and education ==
Georgia Mae Dunston was born in Norfolk, Virginia, to a hard working African-American family. Her parents did not attend college but instead worked various commercial jobs. Ulysses, her father, was employed as a cook at a commercial barbecue wholesaler and Rosa, her mother, worked as a cleaner, presser, and dishwasher. While growing up Dunston attended the local Baptist church and Sunday school. Dunston has credited her interest in genetics in part to having grown up in a segregated town and "curiosity about the differences in people."

Close to graduating high school, Dunston was unsure about going to college since no one in her family had gone to college and she was expected to work. Despite this, she acquired a keen interest in Human biology and decided to continue her scientific education. Dunston ended up graduating in the top tier of her class and earned a full scholarship to Norfolk State University.

Dunston received a B.S. in Biology from Norfolk State University and then, after being granted a Carver research Fellowship, gained a M.S. degree in Biology at Tuskegee University. Dunston used paper Chromatography and Electrophoresis to study biochemical differences in DNA in pigeons for her master's thesis. David Aminoff, now an Emeritus Professor at the University of Michigan, who taught Georgia biochemistry at Tuskegee was very impressed with her work ethic and performance, and aided her in gaining funding for a doctorate in human genetics.

In 1972 Dunston earned a PhD in human genetics at the University of Michigan, Ann Arbor. Among other things, she found that the Xh and Pa 1 antigens are identical and that they could be isotypic markers. Additionally she found that anti-Xh was reactive in the sera of Old and New world monkeys but not of Prosimian or lesser mammals, concluding that the isotypic specificity among the higher mammals arose during the speciation process.

== Career ==
After attaining her doctorate in 1972, Dunston took up a position as associate professor on the faculty of the microbiology department at Howard University. In 1975–1976, Dunston undertook a postdoctoral fellowship at the National Cancer Institute, alongside her faculty position, focusing on tumor immunology. During this time Dunston consulted for the Job Corps Sickle Cell Anemia Program for the U. S. Department of Labor, the Cancer Coordinating Council for Metropolitan Washington, the National Institute of Environmental Health Sciences, and the Genetic Basis of Disease Review Committee. Dunston's Associate professorship ended in 1978.

In 1982, funded by the National Institutes of Health (NIH), Dunston was appointed as a scientist at the National Cancer Institute Laboratory of Immunodiagnosis. There she specialized in the immunogenetic characteristics of human killer cells.

Three years later, Dunston was given the opportunity to direct the Human Immunogenetics Laboratory. During this stage of her career she was interested in genetic variations in human major histocompatibility complex (MHC) genes and antigens and their relations with disease in African-Americans. Improvements in the understanding of these genes and antigens could aid the difficulties of receiving organ transplants for African-Americans, whilst also shedding light on their role in general immunological processes. Between 1988 and 1989 Dunston was the co-principal investigator of a NIAID grant to further work on transplantation for Native and African Americans, particularly in histocompatibility testing of transplantation antigens.

From 1991 to 1994, Dunston acted as associate director of the Division of Basic Sciences at Howard University Cancer Center. During this time she contributed to a special report on organ donation for the black community. In the mid-1990s Dunston was one of the first researchers to join the then new Visiting Investigator's Program (VIP) in the National Human Genome Research Institute. She collaborated with the then director Dr. Francis Collins, the scientist who led the Human Genome Project, publishing work on the genetics of type 2 diabetes in West Africa.

In 2001, the partnership between Howard University and the NIH Office of Research on Minority Health provided the foundations for the National Human Genome Center (NHGC). Dunston founded and directed the NHGC with an "unprecented leadership" team at Howard University. Dunston and her team, at the NHGC and Howard University, built a national and international research collaboration focusing on the genetics of diseases common in African Americans and other African diaspora populations.

In March 2015, Dunston was featured in the 37th Annual University-Wide Research Symposium at Tennessee State University. The symposium aims to give students and faculty the opportunity to present findings from their research and gain experience and exposure before advancing to other symposiums or beginning their professional careers. Dr. Dunston officially opened the symposium as keynote speaker on March 30th 2015.

As a full professor at Howard University, Dunston and her group's current research is centered on the exploitation of the power of population diversity in quantifying the information content of the human genome.

== Awards and honors ==
- Howard University College of Medicine Outstanding Research Award
- NAACP Science Achievement Award
- Howard University Graduate School of Arts and Sciences Outstanding Graduate Faculty Member Award (and excellence in teaching)
- E. E. Just Award and Lectureship from the American Society of Cell Biology
- AARP's Impact Award
- A member of the National Advisory Council for the National Institute of Environmental Health Sciences
- A member of Sigma Xi
- A member of the National Academy of Sciences Review Committee on Human Genome Diversity Project
