= Genome Medicine =

- Discipline: Medical genetics
- Language: English
- Edited by: Rabia Begum

Publication details
- History: 2009–present
- Publisher: BioMed Central
- Frequency: Continuous
- Open access: Yes
- Impact factor: 11.2 (2024)

Standard abbreviations
- ISO 4: Genome Med.

Indexing
- CODEN: GMEECG
- ISSN: 1756-994X
- LCCN: 2009243205
- OCLC no.: 897363874

Links
- Journal homepage; Online archive

Genome Medicine is a peer-reviewed open-access medical journal with a focus on medical genetics. It was established in 2009 as a companion journal to Genome Biology and is published continuously by BioMed Central. The editor-in-chief is Rabia Begum.

== Sections ==
The journal comprises six sections: 1) Genomics & epigenomics of disease, 2) Pharmacogenomics & personalized medicine, 3) Genomic epidemiology & public health genomics, 4) Proteomics & metabolomics in medicine, 5) Systems medicine & informatics, and 6) Ethical, legal & social issues, each with a dedicated editor.

== Abstracting and indexing ==
The journal is abstracted and indexed in:

- BIOSIS Previews
- Chemical Abstracts Service
- Index Medicus/MEDLINE/PubMed
- Science Citation Index Expanded
- Scopus

According to the Journal Citation Reports, the journal has a 2017 impact factor of 8.898.
