= Rudolf Uher =

Canadian psychiatrist

- Education: Charles University; Maudsley Hospital
- Awards: Canada Research Chair (2012)
- Scientific career
- Fields: Psychiatry
- Institutions: King's College London; Dalhousie University

Rudolf Uher is a Canadian psychiatrist and professor in the Department of Psychiatry at Dalhousie University in Halifax, Nova Scotia, Canada. His research focuses on the causes, prevention, and treatment of severe mental illnesses such as psychosis, major depression, and bipolar disorder. He was a Canada Research Chair in Early Intervention in Psychiatry at Dalhousie University in 2012. He received the Max Hamilton Memorial Prize from the International College of Neuropsychopharmacology in 2014 and the Royal-Mach-Gaensslen Prize for Mental Health Research from the Royal Ottawa Mental Health Centre in 2016. In May 2020, he was chosen as one of two Nova Scotia experts, along with Emily Marshall, to receive grant funding from the Canadian Institutes of Health Research and Research Nova Scotia as part of a Rapid Research Funding Opportunity. Uher's funding will support his research on the mental health effects of the COVID-19 pandemic, which specifically focuses on parents with preexisting mental illnesses. In June 2020, a study he led reported that individuals with depression who did not respond to the commonly used serotonergic antidepressant escitalopram did respond to treatment with aripiprazole.
