= Ethnicity & Disease =

- Discipline: Epidemiology, basic science, public health
- Language: English
- Edited by: Roland J. Thorpe, Jr., editor-in-chief; Anne M. Dubois, managing editor

Publication details
- History: 1991-present
- Publisher: Ethnicity and Disease, Inc. (United States)
- Frequency: Quarterly

Standard abbreviations
- ISO 4: Ethn. Dis.

Indexing
- CODEN: ETDIEI
- ISSN: 1049-510X (print); 1945-0826 (web)
- LCCN: 91650992
- OCLC no.: 21245181

Links
- Journal homepage; Online access; Online archive

Ethnicity & Disease is a quarterly peer-reviewed international public health journal covering the relationship between ethnicity and health. It was established in 1991 and is published by Ethnicity and Disease, Inc. The journal exclusively publishes information on the causal and associative relationships in the etiology of common illnesses through the study of ethnic patterns of disease. Quarterly issues include original reports, reviews, editorials, perspectives, commentaries and letters on topics such as ethnic differentials in disease rates, the impact of migration on health status, social and ethnic factors related to health care access, and metabolic epidemiology.

The editor-in-chief of Ethnicity & Disease is Roland J. Thorpe, Jr., PhD (Johns Hopkins Bloomberg School of Public Health). An associate editor panel of 12 members oversees the peer review of manuscripts related to basic science, behavioral science, epidemiology, public health, biostatistics, and translational research. In addition, a 15-member editorial board brings expertise in these and other health disciplines.

== Abstracting and indexing ==
Ethnicity & Disease is abstracted and indexed in Medline/PubMed. and archived in PubMed Central.
