= Gene-environment interplay =

Term including multiple ways that genes and environments work together

Gene-environment interplay describes how genes and environments work together to produce a phenotype, or observable trait. Many human traits are influenced by gene-environment interplay. It is a key component in understanding how genes and the environment come together to impact human development. Examples of gene-environment interplay include gene-environment interaction and gene-environment correlation. Another type of gene-environment interplay is epigenetics, which is the study of how environmental factors can affect gene expression without altering DNA sequences.

To study the effect of the environment on the expression of the human genome, family-based behavioral genetic research methods such as twin, family and adoption studies are used. Moreover, the identification of genes under environmental influence can be completed through genome-wide association studies. Research on cases of gene-environment interplay allow for a deeper understanding of the nuances surrounding nature versus nurture debates. Environmental factors can cause deviations from expected gene expression, which ultimately impact cellular processes, such as cell signaling. They can also affect the likelihood of disease. By identifying environmental effects on cellular processes, scientists can gain a better understanding of the mechanisms behind diseases and gain insights into treating them.

== Types ==
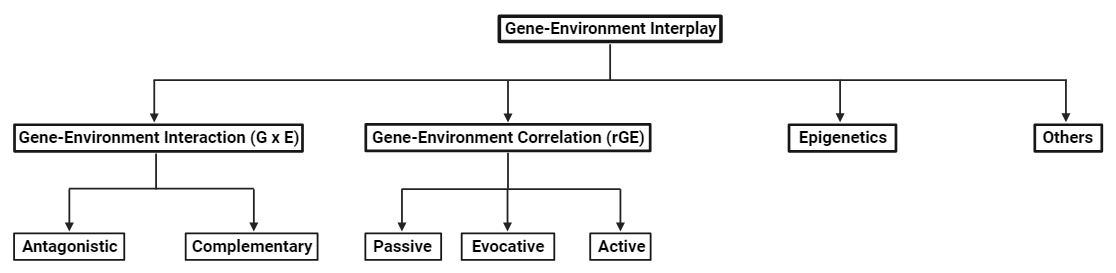
Some of the different types of gene-environment interplay. Adapted from Jaffee and Price, Psychiatry, 2008 and Flowers, Froelicher & Aouizerat, European Journal of Cardiovascular Nursing, 2012

=== Gene-environment interactions (GxE) ===
Gene–environment interaction occurs when genetic factors and environmental factors interact to produce an outcome that cannot be explained by either factor alone. For example, a study found that individuals carrying the genetic variant 5-HTT (the short copy) that encodes the serotonin transporter were at a higher risk of developing depression when exposed to adverse childhood experiences, whereas those with other genotypes (long copy) were less affected by childhood maltreatment. However, there is a caveat as these stressful events may also be caused by an individual's predisposition for getting into these situations.

=== Gene-environment correlation (rGE) ===
Gene–environment correlations describe how different environmental exposures are statistically linked to genes. These correlations can emerge through multiple different mechanisms, both causal and non-causal. In regard to causal mechanisms, there are three common types of gene-environment correlations:

==== Passive ====
The childhood environment of an individual may be correlated with their inherited genes, since an individual's parents may have selected for their childhood environment. This type of correlation is considered "passive" since the child's environment is being determined by parental decisions rather than by the child's own decisions. For example, parents who have high openness-to-experience, which is a moderately heritable personality trait, are more likely to provide their children with musical training. Consequently, a correlation has also been documented between children with more openness-to-experience and their likelihood of receiving musical training as young children.

==== Evocative ====
This type of gene-environment correlation can emerge when an individual's genetics causes others to alter their environment. For instance, one study on children in middle childhood found that a child's innate desire for autonomy partially determined the degree of maternal control evoked.

==== Active ====
This occurs when individuals seek out environments that are compatible with their genetic predispositions. For example, a person with a genetic predisposition for athleticism may be more inclined to choose sports-related activities and environments.

=== Epigenetics ===
Epigenetics focuses on cellular changes in gene expression that do not involve changes in genetic code. Epigenetic changes can be a result of cellular mechanisms or environmental factors. One instance of an environment impacting gene expression is DNA methylation as a result of smoking during pregnancy. Another environmental exposure that can trigger epigenetic changes is heavy metals like arsenic. This is done through the disturbance of histone acetylation and DNA methylation which is correlated with increased rates of cancer, autoimmune diseases, and neurological disorders.

== Environmental factors ==
=== Pollutants ===
Epigenetic modifications can affect gene activity independently of DNA sequence modifications. Air pollution exposure has been associated with decreased DNA methylation levels which is a process crucial for gene regulation. The effects of air pollution can be seen in the prenatal environment as methylation changed in response to the presence of NO_{2} and NO_{x}_{,}which are forms of air pollution. When exposed to air pollution, there was a decline in intrauterine growth. While the mechanism is not fully understood, it could involve the formation of reactive oxygen species, leading to oxidative stress and cellular signaling cascade or increased fetal cortisol levels. A consequence of altered DNA methylation is hydroxymethylation, which replaces the methyl group with a hydroxyl group. Hydroxymethylation potentially could disrupt gene expression patterns and contribute to disease development, such as lung cancer. Additionally, exposure to pollutants can exacerbate inflammatory conditions like asthma by inducing inflammation in the airways. This leads to increased cytokine expression and immune cell recruitment. Certain pollutants, such as endocrine-disrupting chemicals (EDC), interfere with hormone signaling pathways and gene expression related to hormone regulation. A certain type of EDC, bisphenol A has been linked to changes in gene expression in reproductive tissues and developmental pathways.

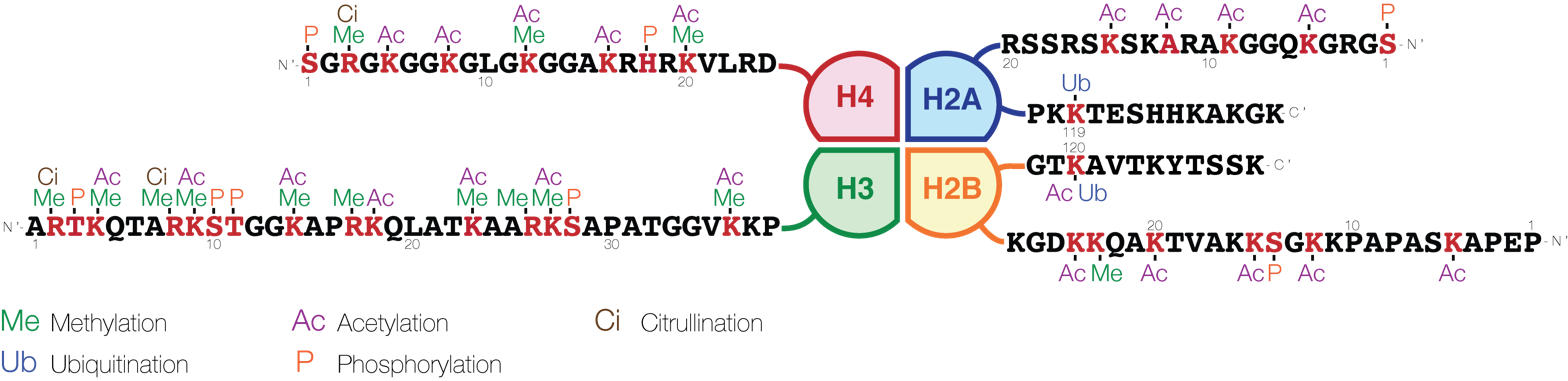
Schematic representation of epigenetic histone modifications. Based on Rodriguez-Paredes and Esteller, Nature, 2011

=== Malnutrition ===
Nutrition plays a crucial role in shaping gene expression, which can ultimately impact an individual's phenotype. Fetal malnutrition, for example, has been associated with decreased level DNA methylation, particularly on genes like IGF2, which is involved in insulin metabolism. The alteration in DNA methylation patterns can elevate the risk of developing metabolic disorders and type II diabetes mellitus. Furthermore, prenatal malnutrition can lead to differential DNA methylation of genes related to growth, development, and metabolism. These epigenetic changes increase the likelihood of adverse phenotypes such as obesity and high cholesterol later in life. Malnutrition can also significantly impact gene expression in the small intestine, leading to alterations in nutrient transporters, digestive enzymes, barrier function, immune responses, and metabolic adaptation. Socioeconomic factors such as poverty and minority status may exacerbate the effects of malnutrition. Research indicates that individuals that reside in impoverished communities or those who belong to marginalized racial and ethnic groups may encounter limited access to nutritious food options.

=== Exercise ===
Physical activity induces epigenetic modifications of specific genes, altering their expression profiles. For example, exercise has been linked to increased methylation of the ASC gene, which typically decreases with age. Methylation can compact a gene, decreasing the amount of protein produced from the gene and the ASC gene stimulates cytokine production. Thus, the expression of inflammatory cytokines decreases. This suppression can help prevent the development of chronic inflammation and associated age-related diseases due to excess inflammatory cytokines. However, these epigenetic modifications depend on the intensity and type of exercise and are reversible with the cessation of physical activity. Research shows that exercise for more than six months can have an effect on telomere length. Elongation at the ends of chromosomes helps to maintain chromosomal stability and induces epigenetic modifications of specific genes.

=== Prenatal environment ===
The maternal environment can have epigenetic effects on the developing fetus. For instance, alcohol consumed during pregnancy can cross from maternal blood to the placenta and into the fetal environment of the amniotic cavity, where it can induce epigenetic modifications on fetal DNA. Mouse embryo cultures show that alcohol exposure during fetal development can contribute to changes in DNA methylation of genes involved in development, metabolism, and organization of DNA during brain development. These alcohol-induced changes in DNA methylation during pregnancy contribute to the distinct set of traits seen in Fetal Alcohol Spectrum Disorder (FASD). Other instances of prenatal environment impact on fetal epigenetic state include maternal folic acid, stress, and tobacco smoking during pregnancy.

=== Early life stress ===
Early life stress encompasses parental absence, abuse, and lack of bonding. These stressors during early childhood are associated with epigenetic modifications of the Hypothalamic-Pituitary-Adrenal (HPA) axis, which mediates the stress response. Using a rat model of maternal care, research has shown that reduced care between mother and offspring is associated with down regulation of glucocorticoid receptors (GR) in the hypothalamus. GRs play a critical role in the HPA axis by aiding in the restoration of normal physiological state after stress exposure. Down regulation of GRs expression occurs through histone modifications and DNA methylation of the GR gene, resulting in dysregulation of the stress response, including prolonged inflammation and cellular damage. Additionally, numerous studies have linked early life stress with later-life psychiatric disorders, including anxiety and depression, through epigenetic modulation of genes involved in the HPA axis. Socioeconomic disparities, discrimination, and cultural factors prevalent within minority communities can contribute to heightened levels of stress and adversity, impacting gene expression and health outcomes.

== Studies ==
=== Adoption and twin studies ===
Adoption and twin studies are used to investigate the complex interplay between genes and the environment. These studies typically involve the comparison of identical (monozygotic) and fraternal (dizygotic) twins to determine the extent to which genetic factors and environmental influences contribute to variations in traits or behaviors. These studies have contributed to studies of behavior, personality, and psychiatric illnesses. For example, a Finnish adoption study on schizophrenia revealed that a healthy environment can mitigate the effects of genetics in adopted individuals born to schizophrenic mothers. Criminal and antisocial behavior have also been found to be influenced by both genetic and environmental factors through these types of studies.

=== Animal models ===
Animal models provide a controlled and manipulable environment in which researchers can investigate the complex interactions between genes and environmental factors, shedding light on various biological and behavioral outcomes. For example, one study has demonstrated the utility of mouse models in understanding gene-environment interactions in schizophrenia due to the genetic similarities.

Research on moths and butterflies has shown that environmental factors like bright sunlight influences their color vision. In environments with more light, they develop more of different opsins which allow them to detect light and discern colors. Butterflies depend on color vision to find the correct flowers for their diet and their preferred habitat.

== Medical Conditions ==
Gene-environment interplay has been found to play a part in the majority of diseases. For instance, gene-environment interactions have a prevalent role in mental health disorders; specifically, evidence has found a link to alcohol dependence, schizophrenia, and psychosis. The link to alcohol dependence is potentially influenced by a dopamine receptor gene (DRD2) as individuals with the TaqI allele may have interactions involving this allele and alcohol dependence. This interaction is more prevalent when the individual is experiencing higher stress levels. The impacts on psychosis originate from a single nucleotide polymorphism (SNP), in the AKT1 gene. This causes its carriers who regularly use cannabis to be more susceptible to developing psychosis. Additionally, individuals who are homozygous for this particular AKT1 mutation and use cannabis daily are at an increased risk for developing psychotic disorders. For schizophrenia, genome-wide by environment interaction studies (GWEIS) and genome-wide association studies (GWAS) are used to determine the loci at environmental factors used in the determination of GxE. Evidence also supports that gene-environment interplay is connected to cardiovascular and metabolic conditions. These include roles in obesity, pulmonary disease, and diabetes. The rise in the incidence of type II diabetes is suggested to be linked to interactions between diet and the FTO and KCNQ1 genes. Mutations within the KCNQ1 gene affects a pathway that leads to a decrease in insulin secretion due to a decline in pancreatic β cells, but within mice fed a high fat diet enhanced the dysfunction within the pancreatic β cells.
