= Human Heredity and Health in Africa =

Research initiative

Human Heredity and Health in Africa (H3Africa)
- Commercial?: No
- Type of project: Scientific initiative
- Location: Africa
- Established: 2012
- Funding: Supported by the African Academy of Sciences, National Institutes of Health, and Wellcome Trust
- Status: Active
- Website: h3africa.org

Human Heredity and Health in Africa, or H3Africa, is an initiative to study the genomics and medical genetics of African people. Its goals are to build the continent's research infrastructure, train researchers and clinicians, and to study questions of scientific and medical interest to Africans. The H3Africa Consortium was formally launched in 2012 in Addis Ababa and has grown to include research projects across 32 countries, a pan-continental bioinformatics network, and the first whole genome sequencing of many African ethnolinguistic groups.

== Origin ==
The H3Africa initiative was conceived to address inequalities in global health and genetic research. Though significant progress had been made in genomics, African scientists were typically not involved in collaborations beyond sample collection, and very few medical genetics studies were carried out on African populations despite their considerable genetic variation. One of the goals of the consortium became to train and retain African scientists and to develop genomic infrastructure of the continent in support of such studies. The policy framework for the initiative was centred around fairness in genomics and avoiding exploitation while building the continent's research capacity. This led to a strong emphasis on African leadership and giving African researchers preferential access to resources like funding, samples, and data.

During a meeting in Cairo in 2007, the African Society of Human Genetics (AfSHG) membership agreed to spearhead an African Genome Project (AGP). The AGP would have four components: population genetics, medical genetics, training, and infrastructure. Among its goals, it would sample at least 100 ethnic groups from the continent, develop large-scale resource to study gene-environment interplay of diseases in Africa, train African scientists, and establish laboratories and local research capacity. At the 2009 AfSHG meeting in Yaoundé, Cameroon, the concept was renamed Human Heredity and Health in Africa" to reflect its goals and scope. The AfSHG, along with the United States' National Institutes of Health (NIH), and the United Kingdom's Wellcome Trust convened to create a research agenda, and announced initial funding for H3Africa in London, England, in 2010. In 2011, researchers released the H3Africa white paper, and the first H3Africa investigators met in 2012 in Addis Ababa, Ethiopia.

== Projects ==
Since its inception, members of the H3Africa Consortium have started several major projects and developed H3ABioNet, a pan-continental bioinformatics network. Studies have focused on topics including cardiovascular disease, schizophrenia, and communicable diseases such as trypanosomiasis and HIV. Several genetic loci related to stroke have been discovered, and the H3Africa array was developed to better suit single nucleotide polymorphisms (SNPs) that were common in African populations and act as a base for genome-wide association studies. Variation not previously captured by public databases has also been observed.

To study cardiovascular disease, the group developed the Cardiovascular H3Africa Innovation Resource (CHAIR), which combined six different projects across 15 countries with the goal of eventually recruiting 55,000 study participants.

The Consortium published a major study in 2020 reporting on the whole genome sequencing of 426 individuals from 50 ethnolinguistic groups across Africa, discovering numerous areas of the human genome under strong selection involved in immune response and DNA repair and metabolism. The study was a major milestone in genomics, identifying over three million new genetic variants.
