= List of presidents of the American Society of Human Genetics =

This list of presidents of the American Society of Human Genetics includes all presidents since the Society's creation in 1948.

== Presidents ==
| Year | Name | Comments |
|---|---|---|
| 1949 | H. J. Muller | |
| 1950 | Laurence H. Snyder | |
| 1951 | Lee R. Dice | |
| 1952 | F. J. Kallmann | |
| 1953 | Clarence Oliver | |
| 1954 | James Neel | |
| 1955 | C. Nash Herndon | |
| 1956 | S. C. Reed | |
| 1957 | Curt Stern | |
| 1958 | W. D. Boyd | |
| 1959 | Madge Macklin | |
| 1960 | C. C. Li | |
| 1961 | L. C. Dunn | |
| 1962 | F. Clarke Fraser | |
| 1963 | James F. Crow | |
| 1964 | Arthur Steinberg | |
| 1965 | Howard Newcombe | |
| 1966 | Philip Levine | |
| 1967 | Bentley Glass | |
| 1968 | Irene Uchida | |
| 1969 | Kurt Hirschhorn | |
| 1970 | William Schull | |
| 1971 | Alexander Bearn | |
| 1972 | John Borden Graham | |
| 1973 | Eloise Giblett | |
| 1974 | Victor McKusick | |
| 1975 | John Hamerton | |
| 1976 | Barton Childs | |
| 1977 | Arno Motulsky | |
| 1978 | Alfred Knudson | |
| 1979 | Eldon Sutton | |
| 1980 | Leon Rosenberg | |
| 1981 | Barbara H. Bowman | |
| 1982 | Margery W. Shaw | |
| 1983 | John Walley Littlefield | |
| 1984 | David L. Rimoin | |
| 1985 | Frank Ruddle | |
| 1986 | Charles Scriver | |
| 1987 | Stanley Gartler | |
| 1988 | David E. Comings | |
| 1989 | L. L. Cavalli-Sforza | |
| 1990 | C. Thomas Caskey | |
| 1991 | Michael M. Kaback | |
| 1992 | Walter E. Nance | |
| 1993 | Janet D. Rowley | |
| 1994 | Maimon M. Cohen | |
| 1995 | Judith Goslin Hall | |
| 1996 | Charles Epstein | |
| 1997 | Larry Shapiro | |
| 1998 | Arthur Beaudet | |
| 1999 | Uta Francke | |
| 2000 | Ronald Worton | |
| 2001 | Huntington F. Willard | |
| 2002 | Michael Conneally | |
| 2003 | David Lee Valle | |
| 2004 | Robert Nussbaum | |
| 2005 | Peter H. Byers | |
| 2006 | Stephen T. Warren | |
| 2007 | Wylie Burke | |
| 2008 | Aravinda Chakravarti | |
| 2009 | Edward R. B. McCabe | |
| 2010 | Roderick R. McInnes | |
| 2011 | Lynn Jorde | |
| 2012 | Mary-Claire King | |
| 2013 | Jeffrey C. Murray | |
| 2014 | Cynthia C. Morton | |
| 2015 | Neil Risch | |
| 2016 | Hal Dietz | |
| 2017 | Nancy Cox | |
| 2018 | David L. Nelson | |
| 2019 | Leslie Biesecker | |
| 2020 | Anthony Wynshaw-Boris | |
| 2021 | Gail Jarvik | |
| 2022 | Charles Rotimi | |
| 2023 | Brendan Lee | |
| 2024 | Bruce D. Gelb | |
| 2025 | Sarah Tishkoff | |
| 2026 | Susan A. Slaugenhaupt | |
