= Jarvik =

Jarvik is a surname. Notable people with the surname include:

- Erik Jarvik (1907–1998), Swedish paleozoologist
- Gail Jarvik, American geneticist
- Lissy Jarvik (1924–2021), American psychiatrist, wife of Murray Jarvik
- Murray Jarvik (1923–2008), American researcher and scientist, husband of Lissy Jarvik
- Robert Jarvik (1946–2025), American scientist, researcher, and entrepreneur, known for his role in developing the Jarvik artificial hearts, nephew of Murray Jarvik

== See also ==
- Jarvik, a 2019 Canadian short drama film by Emilie Mannering
- Jarvik-7, an artificial heart
- Mart Järvik (born 1956), Estonian politician
