= Haig Kazazian =

American geneticist (1937–2022)

- Born: Haig Hagop Kazazian Jr. July 30, 1937; Toledo, Ohio
- Died: January 20, 2022 (aged 84); Towson, Maryland
- Education: Dartmouth College, Johns Hopkins University School of Medicine
- Scientific career
- Fields: Genetics
- Workplaces: Johns Hopkins University School of Medicine, University of Pennsylvania

Haig Hagop Kazazian Jr. (July 30, 1937 – January 19/20, 2022) was an American professor in the Department of Genetic Medicine at Johns Hopkins University School of Medicine in Baltimore, Maryland. Kazazian was an elected member of the National Academy of Sciences and the American Academy of Arts and Sciences.

Kazazian determined the molecular basis of single-gene genetic disorders such as hemoglobinopathies and hemophilia and introduced prenatal diagnosis for such disorders. His group was the first to identify a disease-causing mutation resulting from jumping genes in humans. After this discovery, he focused on basic research into LINE retrotransposition in humans and its implications for disease.

== Early life and education ==
Haig Hagop Kazazian Jr.'s Armenian father was from Kayseri, Turkey. He was sent to the Ras el Ain concentration camp in Syria as part of the Armenian genocide, but escaped in 1918 and arrived in the U.S. in 1923. Kazazian's mother, Hermine, left Istanbul and arrived in the U.S. in 1920. They married on January 1, 1929.

Haig Jr. was born in Toledo, Ohio, on July 30, 1937. He grew up speaking Armenian, Turkish and English. He attended Dartmouth College, receiving his A.B. degree from Dartmouth College in 1959, followed by a two-year program at Dartmouth Medical School. He completed his M.D. degree at Johns Hopkins University School of Medicine in 1962, and interned in pediatrics at the University of Minnesota.

== Career ==
Kazazian returned to Baltimore, Maryland as a postdoctoral fellow, studying the genetics of fruit flies and X chromosome inactivation with Barton Childs at Johns Hopkins (1964–1966) In 1966, he joined Harvey Itano at the National Institutes of Health, working as a staff associate for the US Public Health Service. In Itano's labotory, Kazazian worked on hemoglobin regulation.

Kazazian joined the faculty at Johns Hopkins in 1969. He became a full professor, heading the Pediatric Genetics Unit, in 1977. In 1979, he established one of the first DNA diagnostic laboratories, providing molecular detection facilities for identifying monogenic disorders. He introduced prenatal diagnosis for hemoglobin disorders. In 1988, Kazazian became Director of the Center for Medical Genetics at Johns Hopkins. From 1988 to 1994, he and Maxine Singer at the National Institutes of Health (NIH) held joint quarterly lab meetings, sharing their knowledge of the biochemistry and genetics.

Kazazian and Richard Cotton were founding co-editors of the journal Human Mutation, which appeared in 1992. Kazazian became a co-editor of the journal Mobile DNA in 2015.

In 1994, he became Chair of the Department of Genetics at the University of Pennsylvania School of Medicine, holding the position until 2006. He remained at the University of Pennsylvania as the Seymour Gray Professor of Molecular Medicine in Genetics from 2006 to 2010.

In 1999, Kazazian and Arupa Ganguly joined the plaintiffs for Association for Molecular Pathology v. Myriad Genetics, Inc., after they were served with a cease-and-desist letter demanding that they stop breast cancer screenings for the BRCA1 and BRCA2 genes. In a unanimous ruling in 2013, the Supreme Court ruled that companies cannot patent parts of naturally occurring human genes. The Court stated that "a naturally occurring DNA segment is a product of nature and not patent eligible merely because it has been isolated, but manmade cDNA is patent eligible because it is not naturally occurring." In July 2010, Kazazian returned to Johns Hopkins, holding the position of a Professor in the Institute of Genetic Medicine. He closed his laboratory there in 2020.

His book Mobile DNA: Finding Treasure in Junk (2011) gives an overview of research on transposable elements. It does a "remarkable job" of discussing early contributors, the development of computational biology, and the field of mobile DNA and retrotransposable elements. Although the initial chapters of background information on the field have been criticized as less interesting than later and more personal chapters, the account is credited with vividly illustrating "both the destructive and constructive facets of transposition in the genome".

Kazazian died on January 19 or 20, 2022 in Towson, Maryland.

== Research ==
Kazazian made important contributions to human genetics through his research into DNA haplotypes and the molecular basis of beta thalassemia and through his exploration of retrotransposons (jumping genes).

Much of his early research focused on the regulation of hemoglobin synthesis and its implications for the human blood disorder β-thalassemia. Using information on β-globin DNA polymorphisms from Stylianos Antonarakis and others, Kazazian helped develop methods for prenatal diagnosis of sickle cell anemia. Coining the term haplotypes for certain types of polymorphisms, Kazazian collaborated with Stuart Orkin to characterize the mutations causing beta-thalassemia. He used haplotypes to classify β-thalassemia mutations in patients from around the world and to prenatally identify β-thalassemia.

In the 1980s, Kazazian began to study the factor 8 blood-clotting gene, which was known to be defective in hemophilia A. Lab member Hagop Youssoufian found a long interspersed nuclear element (LINE) insertion, a mobile DNA element or transposon colloquially known as a “jumping gene”. Jumping genes were discovered in maize by Barbara McClintock. The Kazazian lab was the first to discover a jumping gene in humans, and to demonstrate that a transposable element caused disease in man via insertional mutagenesis. Kazazian expanded this work to mouse models, providing evidence that active retrotransposons occur in other mammals.

Since then Kazazian has focused on basic research into LINE retrotransposition in humans, and the role of jumping genes in human disease. Retrotransposons copy and insert themselves into new locations in the genome. As a postdoctoral fellow with Kazazian, John Moran developed a cell culture assay to detect retrotransposition. They determined that the average human genome has 80–100 active LINE-1 (L1) retrotransposons, a handful of which are very active. In addition to understanding diseases, studying L1 insertions enables researchers to learn about human diversity.

Kazazian's studies with rodents suggest that retrotransposition tends to occur during early embryonic development. Kazazian found that retrotransposon mobility causes shuffling of exons and their flanking sequences, a discovery with important implications for the understanding of evolution.

Kazazian investigated the possibility that LINE-1 jumping genes play a role in cancer. He and others have observed instances of new insertions of jumping genes in some cancers, but he could not determine whether LINE-1 genes drive cancer development or are a side effect of cancer.

== Awards ==
- 2018, Member, National Academy of Sciences
- 2008, William Allan Award, American Society of Human Genetics
- 2007, Member, American Academy of Arts and Sciences
- 1976, E. Mead Johnson Award for Pediatric Research, Society for Pediatric Research

== Papers ==
- Kazazian, H. H.; Young, W. J.; Childs, B. (December 17, 1965). "X-Linked 6-Phosphogluconate Dehydrogenase in Drosophila : Subunit Associations". Science. 150 (3703): 1601–1602. Bibcode:1965Sci...150.1601K. doi:10.1126/science.150.3703.1601. PMID 5866658. S2CID 19571662.
- Phillips, J. A.; Snyder, P. G.; Kazazian, H. H. (September 1977). "Ratios of α-to β-globin mRNA and regulation of globin synthesis in reticulocytes". Nature. 269 (5627): 442–445. Bibcode:1977Natur.269..442P. doi:10.1038/269442a0. PMID 909594. S2CID 4268291.
- Antonarakis, Stylianos E.; Boehm, Corinne D.; Giardina, Patricia J. V.; Kazazian, Haig H. (January 1982). "Nonrandom association of polymorphic restriction sites in the β-globin gene cluster". Proceedings of the National Academy of Sciences of the United States of America. 79 (1): 137–141. Bibcode:1982PNAS...79..137A. doi:10.1073/pnas.79.1.137. ISSN 0027-8424. PMC 345677. PMID 6275383.
- Orkin, Stuart H.; Kazazian, Haig H.; Antonarakis, Stylianos E.; Goff, Sabra C.; Boehm, Corinne D.; Sexton, Julianne P.; Waber, Pamela G.; Giardina, Patricia J. V. (April 1982). "Linkage of β-thalassaemia mutations and β-globin gene polymorphisms with DNA polymorphisms in human β-globin gene cluster". Nature. 296 (5858): 627–631. Bibcode:1982Natur.296..627O. doi:10.1038/296627a0. PMID 6280057. S2CID 4318868.
- Chakravarti, A; Buetow, K H; Antonarakis, S E; Waber, P G; Boehm, C D; Kazazian, H H (November 1984). "Nonuniform recombination within the human beta-globin gene cluster". American Journal of Human Genetics. 36 (6): 1239–1258. ISSN 0002-9297. PMC 1684633. PMID 6097112.
- Orkin, Stuart H.; Kazazian, Haig H. (December 1, 1984). "The mutation and polymorphism of the human β-globin gene and its surrounding DNA". Annual Review of Genetics. 18 (1): 131–171. doi:10.1146/annurev.ge.18.120184.001023. ISSN 0066-4197. PMID 6084979.
- Francomano, C A; Kazazian, H H (February 1, 1986). "DNA Analysis in Genetic Disorders". Annual Review of Medicine. 37 (1): 377–395. doi:10.1146/annurev.me.37.020186.002113. ISSN 0066-4219. PMID 3010808.
- Kazazian, Haig H.; Wong, Corinne; Youssoufian, Hagop; Scott, Alan F.; Phillips, Deborah G.; Antonarakis, Stylianos E. (March 1988). "Haemophilia A resulting from de novo insertion of L1 sequences represents a novel mechanism for mutation in man". Nature. 332 (6160): 164–166. Bibcode:1988Natur.332..164K. doi:10.1038/332164a0. PMID 2831458. S2CID 4259071.
- Dombroski, Beth A.; Mathias, Stephen L.; Nanthakumar, Elizabeth; Scott, Alan F.; Kazazian, Haig H. (December 20, 1991). "Isolation of an Active Human Transposable Element". Science. 254 (5039): 1805–1808. Bibcode:1991Sci...254.1805D. doi:10.1126/science.1662412. PMID 1662412.
- Bi, L.; Lawler, A.M.; Antonarakis, S.E.; High, K.A.; Gearhart, J.D.; Kazazian, H.H. (May 1995). "Targeted disruption of the mouse factor VIII gene produces a model of haemophilia A". Nature Genetics. 10 (1): 119–121. doi:10.1038/ng0595-119. PMID 7647782. S2CID 27366245.
- Moran, John V; Holmes, Susan E; Naas, Thierry P; DeBerardinis, Ralph J; Boeke, Jef D; Kazazian, Haig H (November 1996). "High Frequency Retrotransposition in Cultured Mammalian Cells". Cell. 87 (5): 917–927. doi:10.1016/s0092-8674(00)81998-4. PMID 8945518. S2CID 260983.
- Moran, John V.; DeBerardinis, Ralph J.; Kazazian, Haig H. (March 5, 1999). "Exon Shuffling by L1 Retrotransposition". Science. 283 (5407): 1530–1534. Bibcode:1999Sci...283.1530M. doi:10.1126/science.283.5407.1530. PMID 10066175.
- Kazazian, Haig H. (August 18, 2000). "L1 Retrotransposons Shape the Mammalian Genome". Science. 289 (5482): 1152–1153. doi:10.1126/science.289.5482.1152. PMID 10970230. S2CID 83267969.
- Ostertag, Eric M.; Kazazian Jr, Haig H. (December 1, 2001). "Biology of Mammalian L1 Retrotransposons". Annual Review of Genetics. 35 (1): 501–538. doi:10.1146/annurev.genet.35.102401.091032. ISSN 0066-4197. PMID 11700292.
- Ostertag, Eric M.; DeBerardinis, Ralph J.; Goodier, John L.; Zhang, Yue; Yang, Nuo; Gerton, George L.; Kazazian, Haig H. (December 2002). "A mouse model of human L1 retrotransposition". Nature Genetics. 32 (4): 655–660. doi:10.1038/ng1022. PMID 12415270. S2CID 22004980.
- Hancks, Dustin C.; Goodier, John L.; Mandal, Prabhat K.; Cheung, Ling E.; Kazazian, Haig H. (September 1, 2011). "Retrotransposition of marked SVA elements by human L1s in cultured cells". Human Molecular Genetics. 20 (17): 3386–3400. doi:10.1093/hmg/ddr245. PMC 3153304. PMID 21636526.
