= ASHG Scientific Achievement Award =

The ASHG Scientific Achievement Award was established in 2001 and is presented annually by the American Society of Human Genetics (ASHG) for outstanding scientific achievements in human genetics that have occurred in the last 10 years.

The award was formerly known as the Curt Stern Award, or the Stern Award, named in honor of Curt Stern (1902–1981), a pioneering human geneticist. It was renamed in 2023 along with several other ASHG awards in a new organizational policy that removed individual's names from awards in favor of descriptive names.

== Award recipients ==
Source: American Society of Human Genetics

Year	Recipient(s)
2001	Daniel Pinkel and Joe W. Gray
2002	James Lupski
2003	David Page
2004	Neil J. Risch
2005	Patrick O. Brown
2006	Harry C. Dietz
2007	Jeffrey Murray
2008	Evan E. Eichler
2009	David Haussler and Jim Kent
2010	Vivian G. Cheung
2011	David Altshuler
2012	Jay Shendure
2013	John V. Moran
2014	Goncalo R. Abecasis & Mark J. Daly
2015	Leonid Kruglyak
2016	Brendan Lee
2017	Nicholas Katsanis
2018	Sekar Kathiresan
2019	Charles Rotimi & Sarah Tishkoff
2020	Fowzan S. Alkuraya
2021	Emmanouil Dermitzakis
2022	Heidi Rehm
2023	Molly Przeworski

== See also ==
- List of genetics awards
