= Jay Shendure =

American geneticist

- Born: Solon
- Education: Harvard University, Princeton University, Harvard Medical School
- Occupation: Geneticist
- Notable work: Polony sequencing
- Awards: ASHG Scientific Achievement Award (2012); National Institutes of Health Director's Pioneer Award (2013); Innovators Under 35 (2006); Richard Lounsbery Award (2019); Fellow of the American Association for the Advancement of Science (2018); Fellow of the National Academy of Inventors (2022); Fellow of the National Academy of Medicine (2025)
- Scientific career
- Fields: Genetics
- Workplaces: University of Washington School of Medicine
- Thesis: Multiplex genome sequencing and analysis (2005)
- Doctoral advisor: George Church
- Academic advisors: Lee M. Silver
- Website: krishna.gs.washington.edu

Jay Shendure is an American geneticist and professor of genome sciences at the University of Washington. He is known for his work on genomic technologies, including developing DNA-based diagnostic techniques, and one of the earliest successful demonstrations of second-generation DNA sequencing.

== Research ==
Shendure's research focuses on the applications of genomic technologies and techniques for molecular and developmental biology. In 2005, his doctoral research with George M. Church resulted one of the first successful proof-of-concepts of next-generation DNA sequencing. Shendure's research group at the University of Washington pioneered exome sequencing and its application to Mendelian disorders, a strategy that has been applied to identify hundreds of disease-causing genes. Other notable accomplishments of Shendure's laboratory include the first whole genome sequencing of a human fetus using samples obtained non-invasively from the parents, and the sequencing of the HeLa genome in agreement with Henrietta Lacks' family.

== Education and career ==
Shendure was born in Solon, Ohio and graduated from Solon High School in 1992. He attended Princeton University where he spent time working in the mouse genetics laboratory of his academic advisor, Lee M. Silver. He graduated summa cum laude in 1996 and studied in Pune, India, on a 1996-1997 Fulbright scholarship. He attended Harvard Medical School as part of the Medical Scientist Training Program, where he received his Ph.D. in 2005 and his M.D. in 2007.

He joined the faculty at the Department of Genome Sciences at the University of Washington in 2007. He was tenured as an associate professor in 2011 and named full professor in 2015. He became the scientific director of the Brotman-Baty Institute in 2017 and in 2023 became the scientific director of the newly-launched Seattle Hub for Synthetic Biology.

== Awards and honors ==
Shendure is a 2006 recipient of the TR35 Young Innovator Award from MIT Technology Review, the Curt Stern Award from the American Society of Human Genetics in 2012, the FederaPrijs from the Federation of Dutch Medical Scientific Societies in 2013, a National Institutes of Health Director's Pioneer Award in 2013, and a Howard Hughes Medical Investigator Award.
