= Jorde =

Jorde is a surname. Notable people with the surname include:

- Lars Jorde (1865–1939), Norwegian painter and illustrator
- Lynn Jorde, American human geneticist
- Peter Jorde (born 1964), Danish actor

== See also ==
- Jorden
