= David Altshuler (physician) =

American geneticist

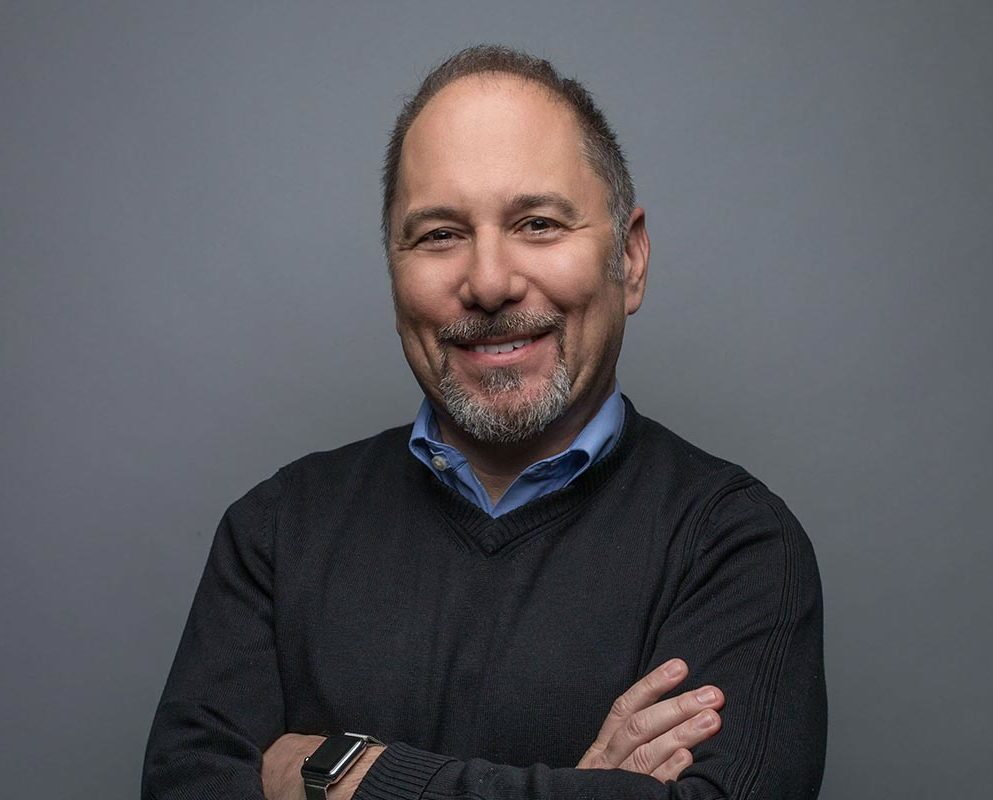
- Born: David Matthew Altshuler; August 27, 1964 (age 61); Ithaca, New York
- Education: Massachusetts Institute of Technology; Harvard Medical School; Harvard University
- Known for: HapMap
- Spouse: Jill Suttenberg Altshuler
- Awards: Curt Stern Award (2011); Outstanding Scientific Achievement Award American Diabetes Association (2012)
- Scientific career
- Institutions: Vertex Pharmaceuticals; Broad Institute; Massachusetts General Hospital; Harvard Medical School
- Thesis: Endogenous retinal activities that influence the development of rod photoreceptors in vitro (1994)
- Doctoral advisor: Connie Cepko
- Notable students: Sekar Kathiresan

David Matthew Altshuler (born August 27, 1964) is an American clinical endocrinologist and human geneticist. Altshuler is a pioneer in the field of genetics as it relates to human disease. He is the former Executive Vice President and Chief Scientific Officer at Vertex Pharmaceuticals and has done work in the field of genetics as it relates to human disease.

== Career ==
Altshuler joined Vertex in 2015 as Executive Vice President and Chief Scientific Officer, and retired in 2026.

At Vertex, he helped develop and implement the company’s research strategy, which led to the approval of several new therapies. Prior to joining Vertex, he was one of four Founding Core Members of the Broad Institute of Harvard and MIT, and served as the Institute's Deputy Director and Chief Academic Officer. At the Broad he was Director of the Program in Medical and Population Genetics, which focused on the underlying genetic basis of diseases. He was a Professor of Genetics and Medicine at Harvard Medical School, and is currently a senior lecturer at Harvard and Massachusetts General Hospital. From 2012 to 2014 he was also an adjunct professor of Biology at Massachusetts Institute of Technology, and was the director of the medical and population genetics program at the Whitehead Institute/M.I.T Center for Genome Research. He was also a faculty member in the Department of Molecular Biology, Center for Human Genetic Research, and the Diabetes Unit, all at Massachusetts General Hospital.

== Education ==
Altshuler attended Commonwealth School in Boston, received his Bachelor of Science from Massachusetts Institute of Technology, his Ph.D. from Harvard University, and his M.D. from Harvard Medical School. He completed his internship, residency, and clinical fellowship training at Massachusetts General Hospital.

== Research ==
Altshuler's academic research focused on human genetic variation and its application to disease, using information from the Human Genome Project. He has co-led the SNP Consortium, International HapMap Project, and 1000 Genomes Project His research focused on the genetic basis of Type 2 Diabetes, and his laboratory contributed to mapping dozens of gene variants that are associated with risk of Type 2 Diabetes, lipid levels, myocardial infarction, rheumatoid arthritis, lupus, prostate cancer, and other disorders.

== Awards and honors ==
Among his awards is election to the National Academy of Sciences, National Academy of Medicine, and the American Academy of Arts and Sciences. American Society for Clinical Investigation, the Association of American Physicians He is a member of the board of directors of the American Society of Human Genetics.

In 2011 he won the Curt Stern Award of the American Society of Human Genetics, and in 2012 the Outstanding Scientific Achievement Award of the American Diabetes Association. He is a member of the board of trustees of Becket Chimney Corners YMCA.

In 2013, Altschuler named a Champion of Change by the Obama White House.

== Personal life ==
Altshuler grew up in Boston. His father, Alan Altshuler, taught urban planning and political science at MIT from 1966 to 1983.
