= Bickell =

Bickell is a surname. Notable people with the surname include:

- Brian Bickell (born 1954), English business executive
- Bryan Bickell (born 1986), Canadian ice hockey player
- Gustav Bickell (1838–1906), German orientalist
- Jack Bickell (1884–1951), Canadian businessman, philanthropist, and sports team owner
  - J. P. Bickell Memorial Award

== See also ==
- Bickel, a list of people with the surname
