= Peter Byers =

Peter Byers may refer to:

- Peter Byers (footballer) (born 1984), Antiguan footballer
- Peter Byers (field hockey) (born 1944), New Zealand field hockey player
- Peter H. Byers, American geneticist and physician
