= Brendan Lee (academic) =

American physician-scientist and academic

- Known for: Genetic bone disorders, translational research, skeletal dysplasia, urea cycle disorders
- Awards: Curt Stern Award (2016); E. Mead Johnson Award (2009)
- Honors: Member, National Academy of Medicine (2013); Fellow, American Academy of Arts and Sciences (2024); Fellow, American Association for the Advancement of Science (2014); Member, Academy of Medicine, Engineering and Science of Texas (2013); Member, Association of American Physicians (2010); Member, American Society for Clinical Investigation (2008)

Brendan Lee is an American physician-scientist and academic specializing in medical genetics, skeletal and metabolic diseases, and translational research. He is Professor and Chair of the Department of Molecular and Human Genetics at Baylor College of Medicine (BCM).

== Career ==
Lee is co-director of the Lawrence Family Bone Disease Program of Texas, a collaborative initiative involving the University of Texas MD Anderson Cancer Center, University of Texas Health, and Baylor College of Medicine. He has held various leadership roles in the program since 2007. He also directs the BCM Center for Skeletal Medicine and Biology, established in 2012, and founded the Baylor College of Medicine Pamela and David Ott Center of Excellence in Heritable Disorders of Connective Tissue and Ehlers-Danlos Syndrome in 2013.

At Texas Children's Hospital, Lee is the director and founder of the Skeletal Dysplasia Clinic. From 2000 to 2020, he led the Medical Students Research Track (renamed the Medical Research Pathway in 2019), and he has been a member of the Faculty Operating Committee for the MD/PhD Program since 1999.

== Research work ==
Lee’s research has focused on genetic bone disorders. His early work contributed to the identification of mutations associated with conditions such as dwarfism and Marfan syndrome. He has investigated the role of transcription factors in skeletal development and identified genes involved in osteogenesis imperfecta (OI). His research implicated increased TGF-β signaling in OI and supported related clinical trials. Other contributions include identifying WNT1’s role in bone mass regulation and examining the involvement of Notch signaling in osteosarcoma and metastatic breast cancer. His group has developed gene therapy approaches for chondrodysplasias and conducted the first in vivo trial using high-capacity adenoviral gene therapy for knee osteoarthritis.

In metabolic disease research, Lee has studied urea cycle disorders (UCD), identifying a protein complex that regulates nitric oxide production and providing a framework for nitric oxide-based therapies.

As of 2025, Lee has authored more than 350 peer-reviewed articles and over 90 reviews, book chapters, and books. His research has received over $139 million in cumulative funding from the National Institutes of Health (NIH). He leads several NIH-supported initiatives, including the Baylor College of Medicine Undiagnosed Diseases Network Clinical Site, the RE-JOIN Consortium site, the Brittle Bone Disorders Consortium, and the All of Us "Evenings with Genetics" Scholars Program.

Lee was instrumental in the development of Baylor Genetics, a molecular diagnostics laboratory that evolved from BCM’s internal diagnostic operations. Under his leadership, the Department of Molecular and Human Genetics has been ranked first in NIH funding among U.S. medical school genetics departments for several years.

== Selected honors ==
=== Memberships ===
- Fellow of the American Academy of Arts and Sciences (2024)
- Member of the National Academy of Medicine (2013)
- Elected fellow of the American Association for the Advancement of Science (2014)
- Elected member of the Academy of Medicine, Engineering and Science of Texas (TAMEST) (2013)
- Elected, Association of American Physicians (2010)
- Elected member of the American Society for Clinical Investigation (2008)

=== Awards ===
- William F. Neuman Award, American Society for Bone and Mineral Research (2022)
- Distinguished Alumnus Award, Baylor College of Medicine Alumni Association (2017)
- Curt Stern Award for Outstanding Scientific Achievement, American Society of Human Genetics (2016)
- Young Alumnus Award, Baylor College of Medicine Alumni Association (2012)
- E. Mead Johnson Award for Pediatric Research, Society for Pediatric Research (2009)
- Peter and Edith O'Donnell Award in Medicine, TAMEST (2009)
