= Dorothy Warburton =

Canadian geneticist (1936–2016)

- Born: 12 January 1936; Galt, Ontario, Canada
- Died: 26 April 2016 (aged 80); Englewood, New Jersey, United States
- Education: McGill University
- Known for: Research contributions to the epidemiology of spontaneous abortion
- Spouse: Frederick Warburton
- Children: 4
- Awards: William Allan Award
- Scientific career
- Fields: Human genetics and cytogenetics
- Workplaces: Columbia University
- Academic advisors: Clarke Fraser

Dorothy Pamela (DeMontmerency) Warburton (12 January 1936 – 26 April 2016) was a Canadian geneticist whose research focused on fetal chromosomal abnormalities and reasons for miscarriage. She died at the age of 80 on 26 April 2016 at her home in Englewood, New Jersey.

== Early life and education ==
Dorothy Pamela DeMontmerency was born in the town of Galt, Ontario on January 12, 1936. Her father worked as an industrial chemist while her mother stayed at home to take care of her and her siblings. She took a liking to biology and natural history from an early age and was especially interested in cytogenetics. This interest carried her through her education and she graduated from McGill University in 1957 with a degree in genetics. She continued her work in genetics at McGill under well-known medical geneticist Clarke Fraser. She completed her doctoral degree in 1961 where her work focused on the recurrence risk of spontaneous abortions.

== Career ==
In 1964, Warburton moved to New York City and took a position as a faculty member at Barnard College of Columbia University. Here, she started training as a human cytogeneticist in the Department of Obstetrics and Gynecology at the Columbia University College of Physicians and Surgeons. Through her time working in the department she quickly recognized the need for a clinical genetic testing lab in the area. In 1969, she founded the Cytogenetics Laboratory at the NewYork-Presbyterian Hospital and Babies Hospital that was affiliated with the College of Physicians and Surgeons. She was director of the lab for 37 years and remained an associate director until her death. Warburton's research over the years of her career centered on four overlapping themes:

- Clinical and research cytogenetics
- The epidemiology of cytogenetic abnormalities
- The epidemiology of human spontaneous abortion
- The pathology of spontaneous abortion

== Personal life ==
Warburton married fellow McGill graduate student Frederick Toney Warburton in 1957. Together they had four children. She was a strong advocate of women balancing both demanding careers and family at the same time. She was frequently met with criticism throughout her career, and was denied faculty appointments and tenure because she was a woman in science.

Warburton shared a rare immune disorder with three of her four children. This condition was known as a neutrophil chemotactic defect, and she and her children often suffered from eczema, asthma, and severe allergies. Due to complications from the condition, one of her daughters unexpectedly died at the age of 24.

== Achievements and awards ==
Throughout her career, Warburton was honoured with many awards and held many achievements and accomplishments. She received the William Allan Award in 2006 for her contributions to medicine and human genetics.

Hers was one of the first labs to use in situ hybridization for human gene mapping, and was able to identify the sites of ribosomal RNA genes. For this she received the 2014 Distinguished Cytogeneticist Award from the American Cytogenetics Conference.
