= Jed Rose (scientist) =

American academic (born 1952)

Jed Eugene Rose
- Born: June 8, 1952 (age 74); Ohio, U.S.
- Education: University of California, Berkeley; University of California, San Diego; University of California, Los Angeles
- Known for: nicotine patch; Nicotine Pyruvate; Nicotine Research
- Spouse: Frédérique Behm
- Scientific career
- Fields: Nicotine Dependence; Psychopharmacology; Neuroscience
- Workplaces: UCLA; Nicotine Research Laboratory, VA Medical Center Brentwood; Duke University Medical Center; Duke Center for Smoking Cessation; Rose Research Center, LLC

Jed Eugene Rose is an American academic professor, inventor and researcher in the field of nicotine and smoking cessation. Rose is presently the president and CEO of the Rose Research Center, LLC in Raleigh, North Carolina. Additionally, he is the Director of the Duke Center for Smoking Cessation at Duke University Medical Center.

== Personal life ==
Jed Eugene Rose was born on June 8, 1952, in Ohio.

Rose received his undergraduate bachelor's degree at the University of California, Berkeley. He later went on to obtain his Ph.D. at the University of California, San Diego and finished his PostDoctoral work at the University of California, Los Angeles

== Inventions and research ==
Rose is most known for co-inventing the nicotine skin patch with the late Murray Jarvik, M.D., Ph.D. and K. Daniel Rose in the early 1980s. Rose et al. published the first study of the pharmacokinetics of a transdermal nicotine patch in humans in 1984 and the subsequently filed US Patent 4920989 which was upheld in a priority decision in 1993. This work helped pave the way for the development of commercial nicotine skin patches.

Rose is also responsible for studying agonist-antagonist treatments that provided support for the development varenicline (Chantix).

Also in the 1980s, Rose developed novel methods for reaerosolizing selected constituents of tobacco smoke in cigarette-sized devices, a forerunner of modern e-cigarettes.

His first NIDA-funded grant, “Scaling the Reinforcing Value of Cigarette Smoke” (1981-2000), measured the role of nicotine in tobacco dependence, by selectively varying nicotine concentrations in smoke while holding tar yield constant, using a two-barreled smoke-mixing device. This method was employed in research cited in the 1988 U.S. Surgeon General's Report on nicotine addiction.

== Significant contributions to science ==
=== Nicotine patch ===
Rose initiated the development of the nicotine patch for smoking cessation: In the early 1980s, he led the initial exploration of transdermal nicotine administration for smoking cessation. In a series of studies he and colleagues showed that transdermal nicotine administration reduced craving for cigarettes and that it was efficacious for smoking cessation. Rose experimented on himself, applying nicotine to his skin and measuring his body's physiological responses.

=== Inspiring the development of Chantix ===
Rose aided in the conception of varenicline for smoking cessation: In the 1990s Rose et al. conducted clinical trials of an agonist-antagonist combination treatment, using nicotine (agonist) and mecamylamine (nicotinic antagonist). The combination proved more efficacious than either agent alone. Pfizer pharmaceuticals cited this work as helping to inspire the development of the partial nicotinic agonist varenicline, which is currently the most effective pharmacologic smoking cessation treatment available.

=== Sensory factors in tobacco addiction ===
Rose demonstrated the role of nicotine and non-nicotine sensory factors in tobacco addiction: In a series of studies, Rose et al. dissociated non-nicotine factors, including sensory cues accompanying cigarette inhalation, from the pharmacologic effects of nicotine. Attenuating these cues, while holding nicotine intake constant, significantly reduced the psychological rewarding and satiating effects of cigarette smoke. Conversely, presenting sensory inhalational cues down-regulated smoking behavior.

=== First radiotracer nicotine studies ===
Rose elucidated the brain pharmacokinetics of inhaled nicotine: Rose et al. conducted the first direct assessment of the rate of brain nicotine uptake during cigarette smoking, using cigarettes spiked with the radiotracer [11C]nicotine and PET scanning to image nicotine in the brain. The results overturned the widely held “puff bolus” hypothesis, which held that the nicotine from each puff of smoke should generate a spike in brain nicotine uptake within 10 seconds. In fact, the lung serves as a depot for nicotine, releasing the dose over several minutes. This new understanding of brain nicotine pharmacokinetics has implications both for the understanding of mechanisms underlying nicotine addiction as well as development of more effective nicotine replacement strategies.

=== First adaptive treatment algorithm for smoking cessation ===
Rose validated the first adaptive treatment algorithm for smoking cessation: Rose led a series of studies showing that the initial response to pre-cessation administration of nicotine skin patch treatment predicted long-term abstinence. Subsequently, this response was used to implement adaptive changes in pharmacotherapy for patch non-responders. Rose continues to develop personalized approaches to smoking cessation treatment based on smokers’ characteristics, including level of nicotine dependence, and genomic markers, which he helped to identify in the first genome-wide association studies of smoking cessation treatment outcome.

== Selected publications ==
- Rose, JE; Behm, FM (2014). "Combination treatment with varenicline and bupropion in an adaptive smoking cessation paradigm". American Journal of Psychiatry. 171 (11): 1199–205. doi:10.1176/appi.ajp.2014.13050595. PMC 4557205. PMID 24934962.
- Rose, JE; Behm, FM (2013). "Adapting quit-smoking treatment based on initial response to pre-cessation nicotine patch". American Journal of Psychiatry. 170 (8): 860–7. doi:10.1176/appi.ajp.2013.12070919. PMC 4562286. PMID 23640009.
- Rose, JE; Behm, FM; Drgon, T; Johnson, C; Uhl, GR (2010). "Personalized smoking cessation: interactions between nicotine dose, dependence and quit success genotype score". Molecular Medicine. 16 (7–8): 247–53. doi:10.2119/molmed.2009.00159. PMC 2896464. PMID 20379614.
- Rose, JE; Mukhin, AG; Lokitz, SJ; Turkington, TG; Herskovic, J; Behm, FM; Garg, S; Garg, PK (2010). "Kinetics of brain nicotine accumulation in dependent and non-dependent smokers assessed with PET and cigarettes containing 11C-nicotine". Proceedings of the National Academy of Sciences. 107 (11): 5190–5. Bibcode:2010PNAS..107.5190R. doi:10.1073/pnas.0909184107. PMC 2841893. PMID 20212132.
- Rose, JE; Herskovic, JE; Behm, FM; Westman, EC (2009). "Pre-cessation treatment with nicotine patch significantly increases abstinence rates relative to conventional treatment". Nicotine & Tobacco Research. 11 (9): 1067–1075. doi:10.1093/ntr/ntp103. PMID 19567826.
- Rose, JE (2007). "Multiple brain pathways and receptor subtypes in tobacco addiction". Biochemical Pharmacology. 74 (8): 1263–1270. doi:10.1016/j.bcp.2007.07.039. PMID 17826746.
- Rose, JE (2006). "Nicotine and nonnicotine factors in cigarette addiction". Psychopharmacology. 184 (3–4): 274–285. doi:10.1007/s00213-005-0250-x. PMID 16362402. S2CID 206898188.
- Brauer, LH; Behm, FM; Lane, JD; Westman, EC; Perkins, C; Rose, JE (2001). "Individual differences in smoking reward from denicotinized cigarettes". Nicotine & Tobacco Research. 3 (2): 101–109. doi:10.1080/14622200123249. PMID 11403723.
- Rose, JE; Westman, EC; Behm, FM; Johnson, MP; Goldberg, JS (1999). "Blockade of smoking satisfaction using the peripheral nicotinic antagonist trimethaphan". Pharmacology Biochemistry and Behavior. 62 (1): 165–172. doi:10.1016/s0091-3057(98)00153-1. PMID 9972860. S2CID 2198708.
- Rose, JE; Behm, FM; Westman, EC; Coleman, RE (1999). "Arterial nicotine kinetics during cigarette smoking and intravenous nicotine administration: Implications for addiction". Drug and Alcohol Dependence. 56 (2): 99–107. doi:10.1016/s0376-8716(99)00025-3. PMID 10482401.
- Rose, JE; Behm, FM; Westman, EC (1998). "Nicotine/mecamylamine treatment for smoking cessation: the role of pre-cessation therapy". Experimental and Clinical Psychopharmacology. 6 (3): 331–343. doi:10.1037/1064-1297.6.3.331. PMID 9725117.
- Westman, EC; Behm, FM; Rose, JE (1995). "Airway sensory replacement combined with nicotine replacement for smoking cessation: A randomized, placebo controlled trial using a citric acid inhaler". Chest. 107 (5): 1358–1364. doi:10.1378/chest.107.5.1358. PMID 7750331. S2CID 27147746.
- Rose, JE; Behm, FM; Westman, EC; Levin, ED; Stein, RM; Ripka, GV (1994). "Mecamylamine combined with nicotine skin patch facilitates smoking cessation beyond nicotine patch treatment alone". Clinical Pharmacology and Therapeutics. 56 (1): 86–99. doi:10.1038/clpt.1994.105. PMID 8033499. S2CID 40192890.
- Rose, JE; Behm, FM; Westman, EC; Levin, ED; Stein, RM; Lane, JD; Ripka, GV (1994). "Combined effects of nicotine and mecamylamine in attenuating smoking reward". Experimental and Clinical Psychopharmacology. 2 (4): 328–344. doi:10.1037/1064-1297.2.4.328.
- Rose, JE; Behm, FM; Levin, ED (1993). "The role of nicotine dose and sensory cues in the regulation of smoke intake". Pharmacology Biochemistry and Behavior. 44 (4): 891–900. doi:10.1016/0091-3057(93)90021-k. PMID 8469698. S2CID 42902056.
- Rose, JE; Levin, ED (1992). "Concurrent agonist-antagonist administration for the analysis and treatment of drug dependence". Pharmacology Biochemistry and Behavior. 41 (1): 219–226. doi:10.1016/0091-3057(92)90086-u. PMID 1539072. S2CID 39612326.
- Rose, JE; Levin, ED; Behm, F; Adivi, C (1990). "Transdermal nicotine facilitates smoking cessation". Clinical Pharmacology and Therapeutics. 47 (3): 323–330. doi:10.1038/clpt.1990.35. PMID 2178852. S2CID 7388534.
- Rose, JE; Behm, FM (1987). "Refined cigarette smoke as a means to reduce nicotine intake". Pharmacology Biochemistry and Behavior. 28 (2): 305–310. doi:10.1016/0091-3057(87)90229-2. PMID 3685063. S2CID 27418498.
- Rose JE. Transdermal nicotine as a strategy for nicotine replacement. In: The Pharmacologic Treatment of Tobacco Dependence: Proceedings of the World Congress, November 4–5, 1985, edited by JK Ockene. Cambridge, MA: Institute for the Study of Smoking Behavior and Policy, pp. 158–166, 1986.
- Rose, JE; Tashkin, DP; Ertle, A; Zinser, MC; Lafer, R (1985). "Sensory blockade of smoking satisfaction". Pharmacology Biochemistry and Behavior. 23 (2): 289–293. doi:10.1016/0091-3057(85)90572-6. PMID 4059314. S2CID 44535348.
- Rose, JE; Herskovic, JE; Trilling, Y; Jarvik, ME (1985). "Transdermal nicotine reduces cigarette craving and nicotine preference". Clinical Pharmacology and Therapeutics. 38 (4): 450–456. doi:10.1038/clpt.1985.203. PMID 4042528. S2CID 19915646.
- Rose, JE; Jarvik, ME; Rose, KD (1984). "Transdermal administration of nicotine". Drug and Alcohol Dependence. 13 (3): 209–213. doi:10.1016/0376-8716(84)90061-9. PMID 6734425.
