= Societal and cultural aspects of Tay–Sachs disease =

Advances in knowledge about Tay–Sachs disease have stimulated debate about the proper scope of genetic testing, and the accuracy of characterizing diseases as specific to one ethnicity. Jewish communities have been in the forefront of genetic screening and counseling for this disease.

== Impact on Jewish communities ==
Ashkenazi Jews have been screened as Tay–Sachs carriers since carrier testing began in 1971. Since the 1970s, many Jewish communities have embraced genetic screening, and in 1971, Israel became the first country to offer free genetic screening and counseling for Tay–Sachs disease and other diseases, leading to international discussion about the proper scope of genetic testing.

Much awareness of Ashkenazi Jews as an ethnic group stems from genetic studies of disease. Some regard these studies as exhibiting ascertainment bias which created an impression that Jews are more susceptible to genetic disease than other populations. They cite BRCA1 and BRCA2 mutations becoming identified as "Jewish mutations," despite there being mutations at these loci found in all populations. Sheila Rothman and Sherry Brandt-Rauf write: "Our findings cast doubt on the accuracy and desirability of linking ethnic groups to genetic disease. Such linkages exaggerate genetic differences among ethnic groups and lead to unequal access to testing and therapy."

== Controversy over heterozygote advantage ==
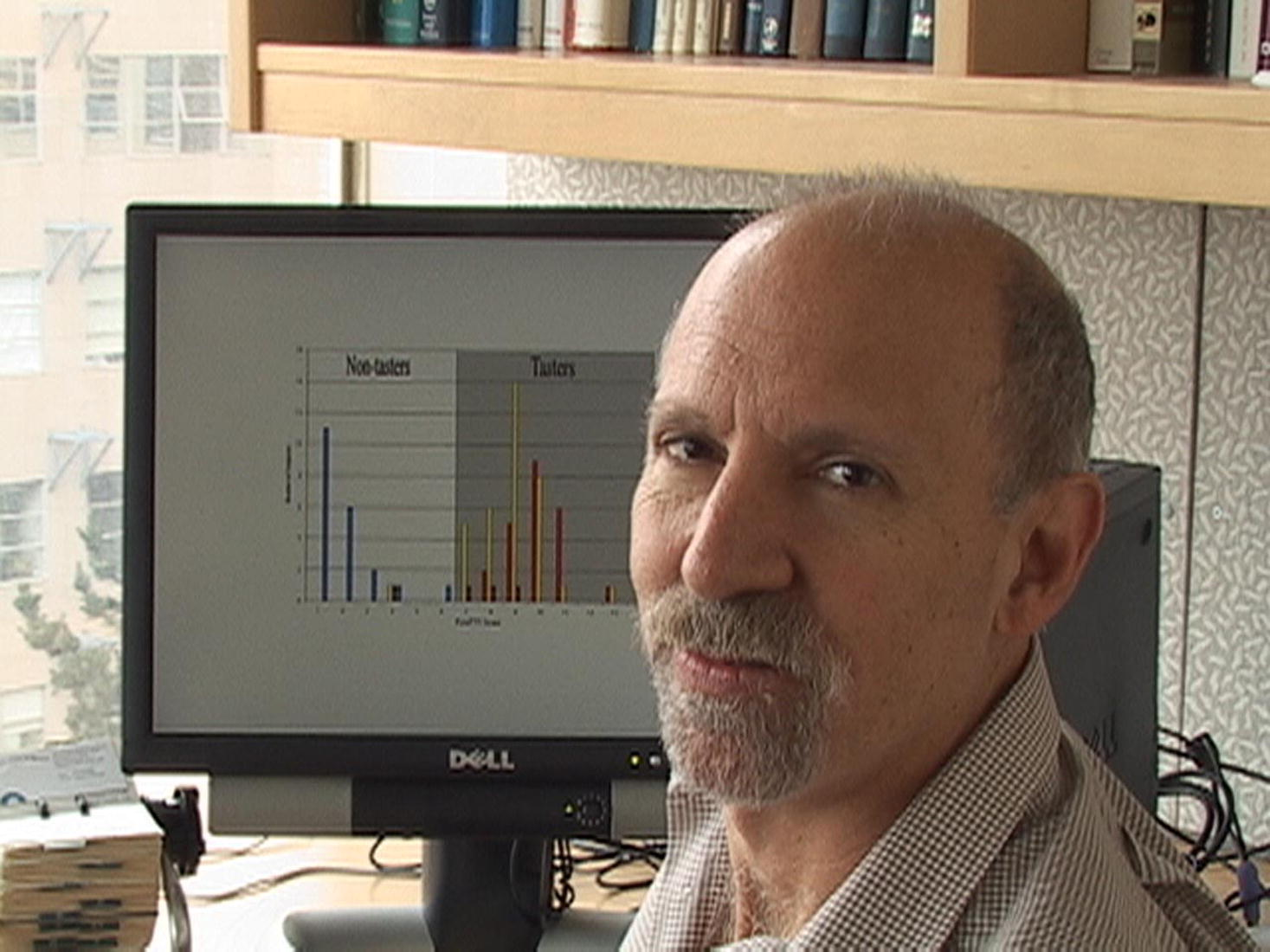
Neil Risch is the principal author of a study which analyzes the geographic distributions of mutations among Ashkenazi Jews. Risch found "compelling support for random genetic drift."

Genetic and historical studies of the Ashkenazi population suggest it may have gone through population bottlenecks, thereby giving strong support to the founder effects theory. Because Tay–Sachs disease was one of the first autosomal recessive genetic disorders for which there was a test, it was intensely studied as a model for all such diseases, and researchers sought evidence of a selective process through a selective advantage for heterozygotes (carriers). Neil Risch writes: "The anomalous presence of four different lysosomal storage disorders in the Ashkenazi Jewish population has been the source of long-standing controversy. Many have argued that the low likelihood of four such diseases — particularly when four are involved in the storage of glycosphingolipids — must reflect past selective advantage for heterozygous carriers of these conditions." Risch, an eminent statistical geneticist, believes the weight of evidence supports genetic drift, not a selective process.

Gregory Cochran proposes that the mutant alleles causing Tay–Sachs confer higher intelligence when present in carrier form, and provided a selective advantage in the historical period when Jews were restricted to intellectual occupations.
