= Bickel =

Bickel may refer to:

- Alexander Bickel (1924–1974), American law professor
- Alfred Bickel (1918–1999), Swiss football player and coach
- Balthasar Bickel (born 1965), Swiss linguist
- Charles Bickel (1852–1921), American architect
- Christian Bickel (born 1991), German football player
- Horst Bickel (1918–2000), German doctor
- Moidele Bickel (1937–2016), German costume designer
- Peter J. Bickel (born 1940), American statistician
- Stu Bickel (born 1986), American ice hockey player
- Susanne Bickel (born 1960), Swiss Egyptologist
- Thomas Bickel (born 1963), Swiss football player
- Vilborg Auður Ísleifsdóttir-Bickel, Icelandic historian
- Warren Bickel, American pharmacologist
- Wolf Bickel, German astronomer

== See also ==
- Bickell, a list of people with the surname
