= William Allan Award =

The William Allan Award, given by the American Society of Human Genetics, was established in 1961 in memory of William Allan (1881–1943), one of the first American physicians to conduct extensive research in human genetics.

The William Allan Award is presented annually to recognize substantial and far-reaching scientific contributions to human genetics carried out over a sustained period of scientific inquiry and productivity. An award of $25,000 and an engraved medal are presented at the Annual Meeting.

== Award recipients ==
Source: ASHG

William Allan Award Winners
Year	Name
1962	Newton Morton
1965	James Neel
1967	Vernon Ingram
1968	Harry Harris
1969	Jérôme Lejeune
1970	Arno Motulsky
1973	Barton Childs
1974	Curt Stern
1975	Philip Levine and Alexander S. Wiener
1977	Victor McKusick
1978	Charles Scriver
1979	F. Clarke Fraser
1980	Walter Bodmer
1981	Patricia Jacobs
1982	Elizabeth Neufeld
1983	Frank Ruddle
1984	Y. W. Kwan
1985	Joseph L. Goldstein and Michael S. Brown
1986	Mary F. Lyon
1987	Luigi Luca Cavalli-Sforza
1988	Torbjörn Caspersson
1989	David Botstein and Ray White
1990	Kary Mullis
1991	Janet D. Rowley and Alfred Knudson Jr.
1992	Alec Jeffreys
1993	Antonio Cao and Michael Kaback
1994	Doug Wallace
1995	Kurt Hirschhorn
1996	Robert Elston
1997	Philip Leder
1998	Bert Vogelstein
1999	Stephen Warren
2001	Charles J. Epstein
2002	Albert de la Chapelle
2003	David Weatherall
2004	Louis M. Kunkel
2005	Francis Collins
2006	Dorothy Warburton
2007	Arthur Beaudet
2008	Haig H. Kazazian, Jr.
2009	Huntington F. Willard
2010	Jurg Ott
2011	John M. Opitz
2012	Uta Francke
2013	Aravinda Chakravarti
2014	Stuart H. Orkin
2015	Kay E. Davies
2016	James F. Gusella
2017	Kári Stefánsson
2018	Eric S. Lander
2019	Stylianos E. Antonarakis
2020	Mary-Claire King
2021	C. Thomas Caskey
2023	Peter Donnelly
2023	Neil Risch

== See also ==
- List of genetics awards
- List of medicine awards
