= Evan E. Eichler =

American geneticist

Evan Eichler
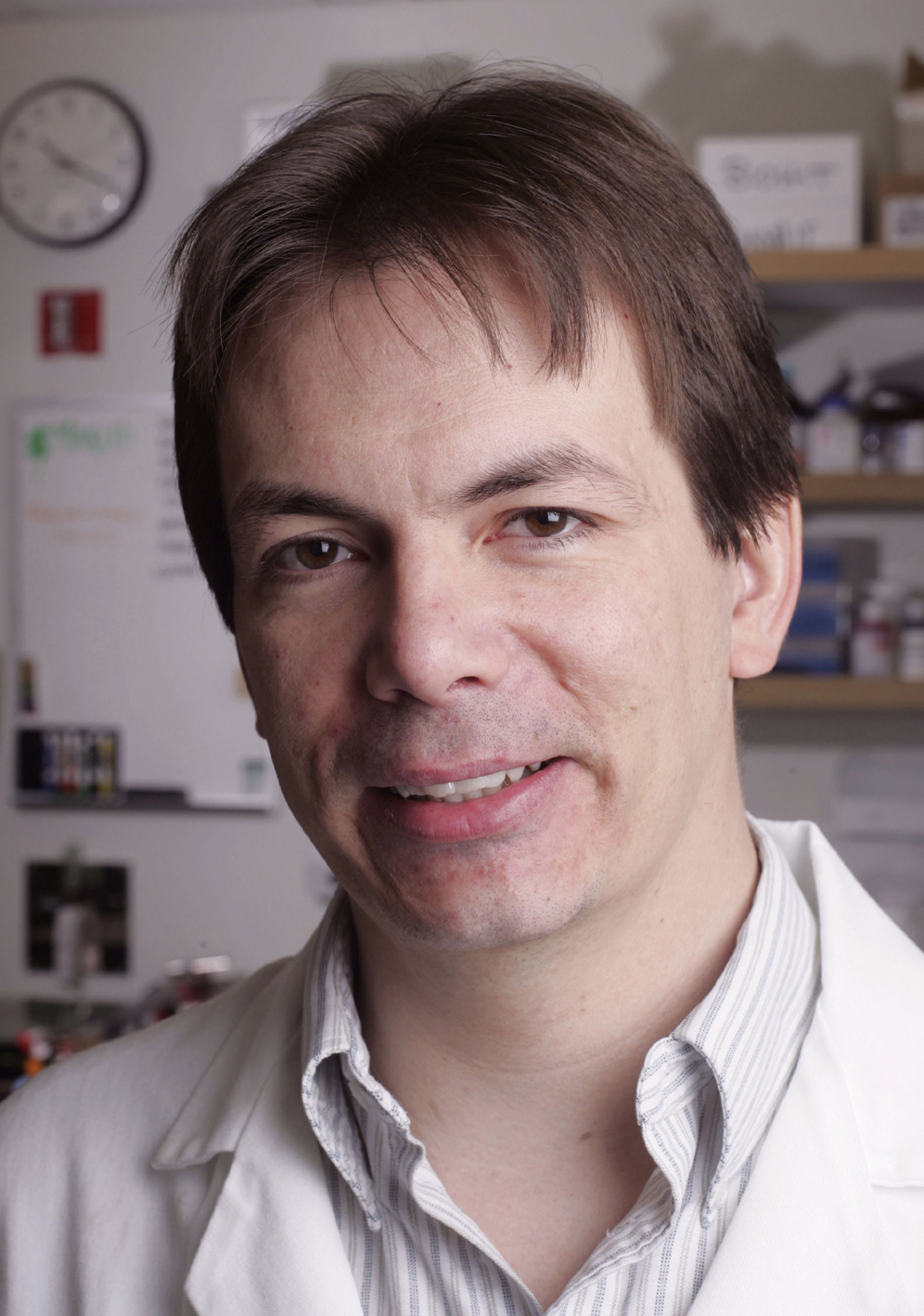
- Evan Eichler photographed by Ron Wurzer
- Education: University of Saskatchewan (B.Sc.); Baylor College of Medicine (Ph.D.)
- Awards: Newcomb Cleveland Prize; Curt Stern Award (2008); Member of the National Academy of Sciences
- Scientific career
- Fields: Genomics; Segmental duplication Copy-number variation Autism spectrum disorder Developmental delay Gene duplication
- Workplaces: University of Washington; Howard Hughes Medical Institute; University of Saskatchewan; Baylor College of Medicine; Lawrence Livermore National Laboratory; LMU Munich; University of Saskatchewan
- Doctoral advisor: David Nelson
- Website: eichlerlab.gs.washington.edu www.hhmi.org/research/investigators/eichler_bio.html

Evan E. Eichler is an investigator at Howard Hughes Medical Institute studying human genome evolution, genome variation and their role in diseases. He is also a Professor of Genome Sciences at the University of Washington School of Medicine, Seattle.

== Education ==
Eichler was educated at the University of Saskatchewan and the Baylor College of Medicine where he was awarded his PhD in 1995 for work on the FMR1 gene.

== Research ==
Eichler is considered one of the experts in genome instability studies, segmental duplication and structural variation.

== Awards ==
- Eichler is an elected Fellow of the American Association for the Advancement of Science.
- Eichler received the 2008 Curt Stern Award from the American Society of Human Genetics.
- He was a co-recipient of the 2010 Newcomb Cleveland Prize by the American Association for the Advancement of Science as one of the co-authors of the May 2010 paper in Science on draft sequencing of the Neanderthal genome.
- Eichler is also a member of the National Academy of Sciences.
