= Nicholas Katsanis =

Greek geneticist and novelist

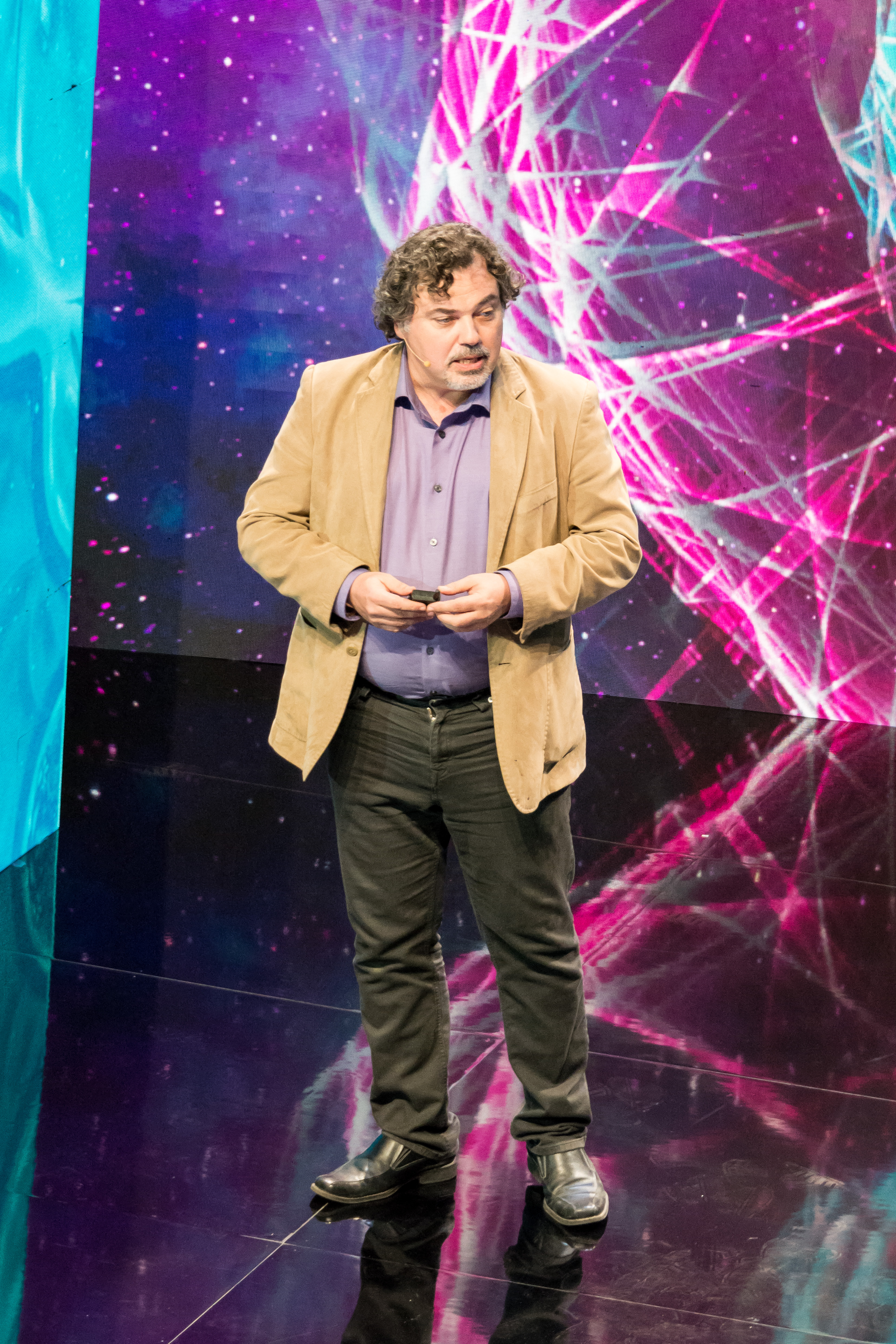
- Katsanis at Congreso Futuro 2020
- Born: London, England
- Education: University College London (BSc); Imperial College London (PhD)
- Known for: Ciliopathies; Bardet–Biedl syndrome Oligogenic inheritance Genetic burden Functional genomics
- Awards: Stein Innovation Award; Curt Stern Award; E. Mead Johnson Award for Pediatric Research
- Scientific career
- Fields: Human genetics Molecular genetics Genomic medicine
- Workplaces: Johns Hopkins University; Duke University; Galatea Bio

Elias Nicholas Katsanis is a Greek human geneticist known for research on the molecular basis of rare inherited disorders, especially ciliopathies. He is recognized for discoveries in Bardet–Biedl syndrome, contributions to the concepts of modifier alleles and genetic burden, and for developing multi-model functional genomics platforms. Katsanis has held faculty positions at the Johns Hopkins University Institute of Genetic Medicine and at Duke University, where he founded the Center for Human Disease Modeling.

== Education and training ==
Katsanis earned a Bachelor of Science in genetics from University College London in 1993, followed by a PhD in human molecular genetics from Imperial College London in 1997, where his dissertation focused on the genetics of Down syndrome. He subsequently completed a postdoctoral fellowship with James R. Lupski at the Baylor College of Medicine, initiating work on Bardet–Biedl syndrome and other multi-system developmental disorders of previously unknown etiology.

== Career ==
Katsanis joined the Johns Hopkins University Institute of Genetic Medicine (IGM) in 2002, where his laboratory demonstrated that several Bardet–Biedl syndrome (BBS) proteins localize to primary cilia, establishing the mechanistic link between BBS and ciliary dysfunction. This work helped define BBS as a model ciliopathy and broadened recognition of primary cilia as a central organelle in human developmental disorders.

In 2009, he became the founding director of the Center for Human Disease Modeling (CHDM) at Duke University. He served as the institute's director until 2019.

Katsanis co-founded multiple biotech startups, including Galatea Bio 2021, a genomics company focused on improving population diversity in genomic reference datasets and creating ancestry-aware tools for research and precision medicine.

Katsanis received the Young Investigator Award from the American Society of Nephrology in 2010, the E. Mead Johnson Award for Pediatric Research in 2012, the Curt Stern Award from the American Society of Human Genetics in 2017, and the Stein Innovation Award from Research to Prevent Blindness in 2017.

== Research ==
Katsanis has authored over 250 peer-reviewed publications. His research showed the role of primary cilia in human developmental disorders, including Bardet–Biedl syndrome (BBS), Meckel syndrome, nephronophthisis, and Joubert syndrome. His work demonstrated that disruptions in ciliary trafficking and signaling contribute to the pathogenesis of these conditions. He co-authored a 2006 review that helped introduce the term ciliopathies to describe them as a mechanistic group.

Katsanis' research also focused on Oligogenic inheritance and genetic burden. His discovery of triallelic inheritance in BBS provided early evidence that some Mendelian conditions involve combined effects of variants across multiple loci. He subsequently developed frameworks describing modifier alleles, secondary-variant burden, and the non-random clustering of genetic variants within biological modules, influencing network-based models of human disease.

At Duke, Katsanis helped establish functional genomics platforms integrating zebrafish, mouse, and cell-based systems to evaluate human genetic variants. This contributed to the development of functional criteria for variant interpretation in rare disease diagnostics and experimental genomics.
