= John Moran (geneticist) =

American geneticist

John Moran is an American geneticist and former Howard Hughes Medical Institute investigator, currently on the faculty at the University of Michigan Medical School, where he is a professor of Human Genetics.

Moran's research focuses on the study of mobile elements, short DNA sequences that can propagate themselves inside the genomes of more complex living organisms. In human DNA, insertions of Alu and other mobile elements can be used to track evolution of DNA sequences and are sometimes responsible for human disease.

In 2013, Moran was awarded the American Society of Human Genetics Curt Stern award, which recognizes an individual with major contributions to the field of human genetics over the previous decade.
