= Andrew G. Clark =

American biologist

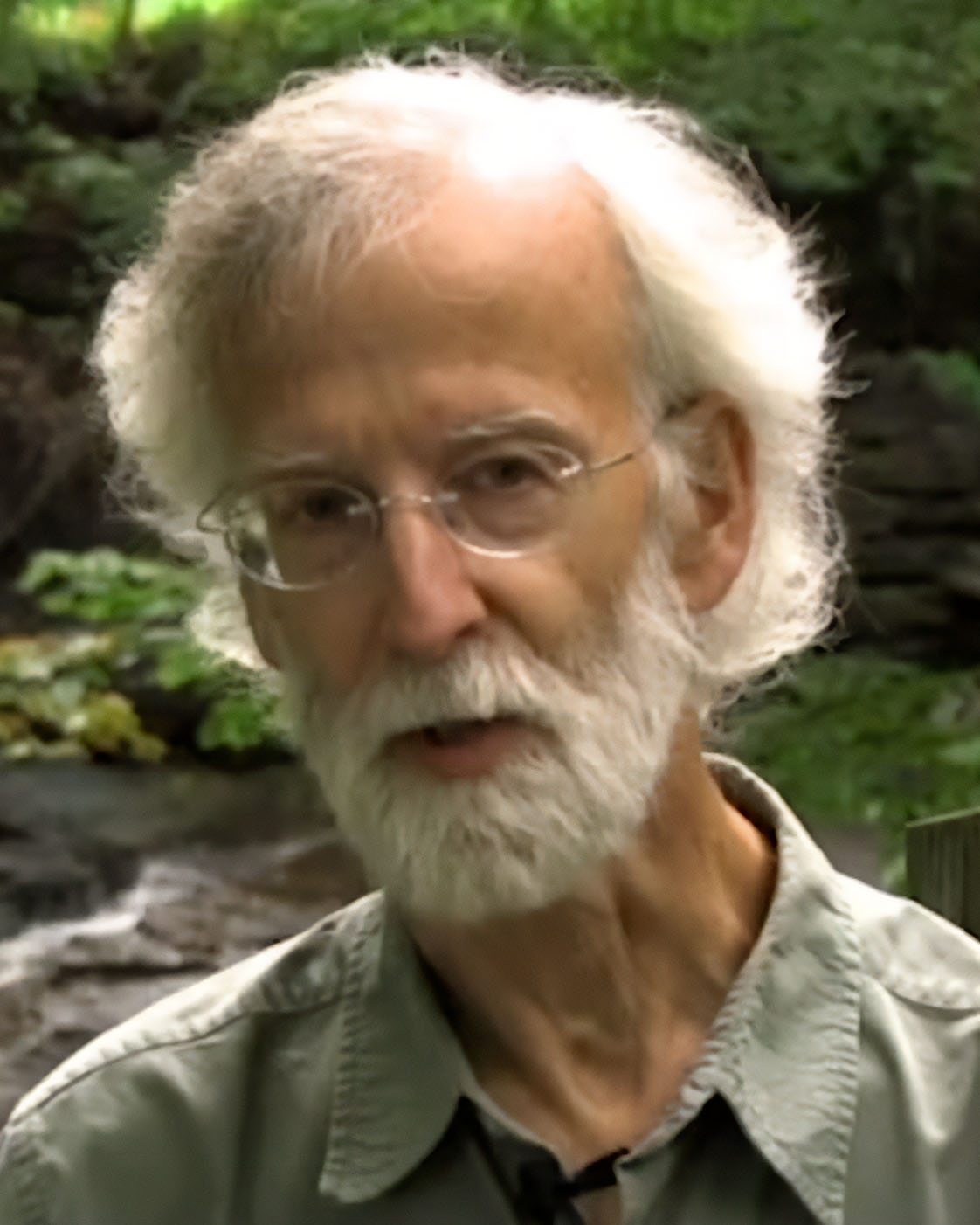
- Born: 1954 (age 71–72)
- Education: Brown University (BS); Stanford University (PhD)
- Awards: National Academy of Sciences, American Academy of Arts and Sciences
- Scientific career
- Fields: Population genetics
- Workplaces: Cornell University
- Doctoral students: Emmanouil Dermitzakis

Andrew Galen Clark (born 1954) is an American population geneticist. He is currently Jacob Gould Schurman Professor of Population Genetics in the Department of Molecular Biology and Genetics and a Nancy and Peter Meinig Family Investigator at Cornell University. He is the current head of the Graduate Computation Biology field. He is also co-director of Cornell's Center for Comparative and Population Genomics and a member of a working group for the National Human Genome Research Institute.

== Career ==
Clark received a Bachelor of Science from Brown University in 1976, followed by a Ph.D. in population genetics from Stanford University in 1980. He then worked as a postdoctoral researcher at Arizona State University and the University of Aarhus, before joining the faculty of Penn State University's Department of Biology. Since 2002, he has been a professor at Cornell University.

He was elected a fellow of the American Association for the Advancement of Science in 1994, and a member of the National Academy of Sciences in 2012. Clark's laboratory group researches genetic variation and adaptation using both human data and the laboratory model Drosophila melanogaster.

== Honors ==
- Elected member, National Academy of Sciences
- Elected member, American Academy of Arts and Sciences, 2016
