= Stylianos Antonarakis =

Greek geneticist

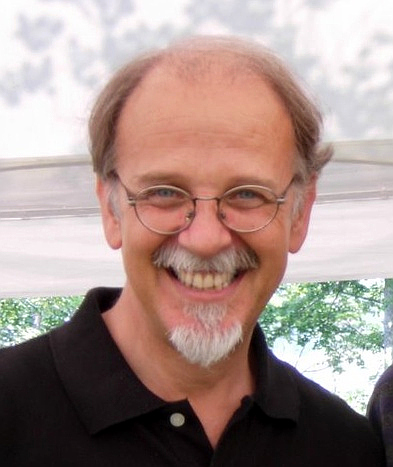
- Born: 1951 (age 74–75)
- Education: University of Athens, Johns Hopkins School of Medicine
- Known for: The relationship between genomic and phenotypic variations, Genetics in Medicine
- Awards: William Allan Award of the American Society of Human Genetics
- Scientific career
- Fields: Human genetics
- Workplaces: University of Geneva Medical School

Stylianos E. Antonarakis (born 1951) is a Greece-born human geneticist.

Antonarakis is Professor of Genetic Medicine ath the University of Geneva Medical School in Switzerland. From 2012 to 2017 he was the director of the iGE3 institute of Genetics and Genomics in Geneva, which he co-founded. He is the President of the Human Genome Organization (since 2013), a member of the scientific council of the Swiss National Science Foundation, and chair of the Genetics panel of the European Research Council. Previously he was the President of the European Society of Human Genetics.

Antonarakis holds degrees in medicine, from the University of Athens, and in human genetics, from the Johns Hopkins School of Medicine, Maryland, US. His research focuses on the relationship between genomic and phenotypic variations, in particular the functional analysis of the genome, effect of human genetic variation to phenotypic variation, the molecular pathogenesis of trisomy 21 and polygenic phenotypes, the functional characterization of the conserved fraction of the genome, diagnostics and prevention of genetic disorders, and the societal implications of genetics and genome research.

Antonarakis co-authored more than 620 papers and is listed as one of the highly cited scientists by the Institute for Scientific Information (h-index 149 according to Google Scholar by the end of April 2020). He is co-editor of the classic textbook Genetics in Medicine, and is an editor of journals Annual Review of Genetics, Genomics and Genome Research and eLife.

== Honors and awards ==
- 2019 William Allan Award of the American Society of Human Genetics
