= Sekar Kathiresan =

American geneticist

- Born: India
- Education: Harvard Medical School; University of Pennsylvania
- Known for: Discoveries of genetic mutations which confer resistance to cardiovascular diseases, including the discovery of protective mutations in the ANGPTL3 gene
- Awards: 2017 Distinguished Scientist Award by AHA; 2018 Curt Stern Award by ASHG
- Scientific career
- Fields: Human genetics

Sekar Kathiresan is a physician-scientist and human geneticist, currently serving as a chief executive officer and co-founder of Verve Therapeutics. His research is focused on understanding the genetic risk factors of heart attack and blood lipids to improve cardiac care. His research has led to notable discoveries of genetic mutations which confer resistance to cardiovascular diseases, including the discovery of protective mutations in the ANGPTL3 gene.

Prior to joining Verve in July 2019, he served as director of the Massachusetts General Hospital Center for Genomic Medicine and was the Ofer and Shelly Nemirovsky MGH Research Scholar. He also served as director of the Cardiovascular Disease Initiative at the Broad Institute and was a Professor of Medicine at Harvard Medical School.

In 2023, Verve established a global collaboration with Eli Lilly for advancing programs in cardiovascular disease, and the pharmaceutical giant announced a $1.3 billion deal to buy Verve in 2025 as they sought to expand their experimental medicines pipeline by targeting the three lipoprotein drivers of atherosclerosis: low-density lipoproteins, triglyceride-rich lipoproteins, and lipoprotein(a).

== Education ==
He received his M.D. from Harvard Medical School in 1997. He then completed his clinical training in internal medicine and cardiology at Massachusetts General Hospital, where he served as chief resident in Internal Medicine from 2002 to 2003. Kathiresan pursued postdoctoral research training from 2003 to 2008 in cardiovascular genetics through a combined experience at the Broad Institute and the Framingham Heart Study, jointly mentored by Drs. David Altshuler, Joel Hirschhorn, and Christopher J. O'Donnell. In 2008, he joined the faculty of the Massachusetts General Hospital Cardiology Division, Cardiovascular Research Center, and Center for Genomic Medicine.

Prior to medical school, he received his B.A. in history with Honors and graduated summa cum laude from the University of Pennsylvania in 1992 and earlier, Kathiresan attended North Allegheny public schools in Pittsburgh and graduated valedictorian of North Allegheny Senior High School in 1988.

== Research ==
Kathiresan has helped highlight new biological mechanisms underlying heart attack, discovered mutations that protect against heart attack risk, highlighted triglyceride-rich lipoproteins as a therapeutic target, and developed a framework to interpret the genome for heart attack risk which includes monogenic, somatic, and polygenic drivers of disease risk. His work has also challenged the assumption that high levels of HDL cholesterol, often referred to as "good cholesterol," are protective against heart attacks. His clinical focus is the prevention of myocardial infarction in individuals with a family history of heart attack.

He has over 152,000 citations and a h-index of 138 according to Google Scholar.

== Awards ==
- 2018 Joseph A. Vita Award: American Heart Association
- 2018 Curt Stern Award: American Society of Human Genetics
- 2017 Distinguished Scientist: American Heart Association
- 2013 Ofer and Shelley Nemirovsky MGH Research Scholar
- 2011 ASCI Member
- 2006 Doris Duke Clinical Scientist Development Award
