= GenePeeks =

- Founders: Anne Morriss; Lee Silver
- Location: New York City
- Website: web.archive.org/web/20181002125843/https://www.genepeeks.com/ October 2018

GenePeeks is a genetic research company that owns and runs Matchright, a simulation that determines the probability of genetic disorders being present in a child given two people's DNA.

== Overview ==
GenePeeks simulates the combination of genetic sequences of two people and predicts potential diseases and inherited disorders to find good recipient matches for sperm donors. By simulating the process of reproduction with the two DNA sequences, the company's software (called Matchright) forms a hypothetical child genome to determine the likelihood of the resulting child developing one of around 600 conditions. The technology is currently aimed at sperm banks; the first users will be at two fertility clinics in the United States, one of which is Manhattan Cryobank in New York City.

The software creates around 10,000 virtual genomes for each donor-recipient pair, and typically rules out 10-15% of donors as bad matches for the recipient. Currently it only searches for single gene genetic conditions, but the company plan to expand the software to look for multiple gene diseases like diabetes and heart disease.

Concern has been raised as to whether the software would allow "designer babies", but the company say that they are not intending to use the system for non-medical purposes.

== History ==
GenePeeks was established by Anne Morriss and Lee Silver. Silver is a genetics professor at Princeton University whose work is focused on reproduction and development. Morriss was motivated to start the service in part by her own experience of starting a family; her son received an inherited disorder (MCADD) after being conceived with sperm from a donor. The two started GenePeeks after being introduced by a mutual friend.

In January 2014 the company was issued a patent for their algorithms to simulate genetic interactions.

In October 2018, Anne Morriss had left the company and the company website has since been taken down.
