= Warren Bickel =

American behavioral pharmacologist (1955 or 1956 – 2024)

- Born: Warren Kurt Bickel; June 16, 1956
- Died: September 28, 2024 (aged 68)
- Education: State University of New York at New Paltz; University of Kansas
- Scientific career
- Fields: Addiction medicine; Behavioral medicine; Behavioral pharmacology
- Institutions: Virginia Tech
- Thesis: The Effects of Behavioral History on Hierarchies of Controlling Stimulus-Response Relations (1983)

Warren Kurt Bickel (June 16, 1956 – September 28, 2024) was an American behavioral pharmacologist and the Virginia Tech Carilion Behavioral Health Research Professor at the Fralin Biomedical Research Institute in Virginia Tech's Carilion School of Medicine. He was also a professor of psychology at Virginia Tech and a professor of psychiatry and behavioral medicine in their Carilion School of Medicine, the director of Virginia Tech's Addiction Recovery Research Center, and the co-director of their Center for Transformative Research on Health Behaviors. He formerly served as editor-in-chief of Experimental and Clinical Psychopharmacology and as president of Division 28 (Psychopharmacology and Substance Abuse) of the American Psychological Association. Bickel died on September 28, 2024, at the age of 68.
