= Mobile DNA (journal) =

Peer-reviewed genomics journal

- Discipline: Genomics
- Language: English
- Edited by: Marlene Belfort; Cédric Feschotte; Haig Kazazian; Henry Levin

Publication details
- History: 2010–present
- Publisher: BioMed Central
- Frequency: Continuous
- Open access: Yes
- Impact factor: 5.891 (2017)

Standard abbreviations
- ISO 4: Mob. DNA

Indexing
- ISSN: 1759-8753
- LCCN: 2010243274
- OCLC no.: 794607415

Links
- Journal homepage; Online archive

Mobile DNA is a peer-reviewed online-only open access scientific journal covering genomics, with a specific focus on transposable elements in DNA. It was established in 2010 and is published by BioMed Central. The current editors-in-chief are Irina Arkhipova (Marine Biological Laboratory at Woods Hole), Kathleen Burns (Dana-Farber Cancer Institute) and Pascale Lesage (INSERM). Prior Editors in Chief have included Marlene Belfort (University at Albany), Cédric Feschotte (Cornell University), Henry Levin (National Institutes of Health), and the late Haig Kazazian (Johns Hopkins University School of Medicine). According to the Journal Citation Reports, the journal has a 2022 impact factor of 4.9.
