= Wylie Burke =

American geneticist

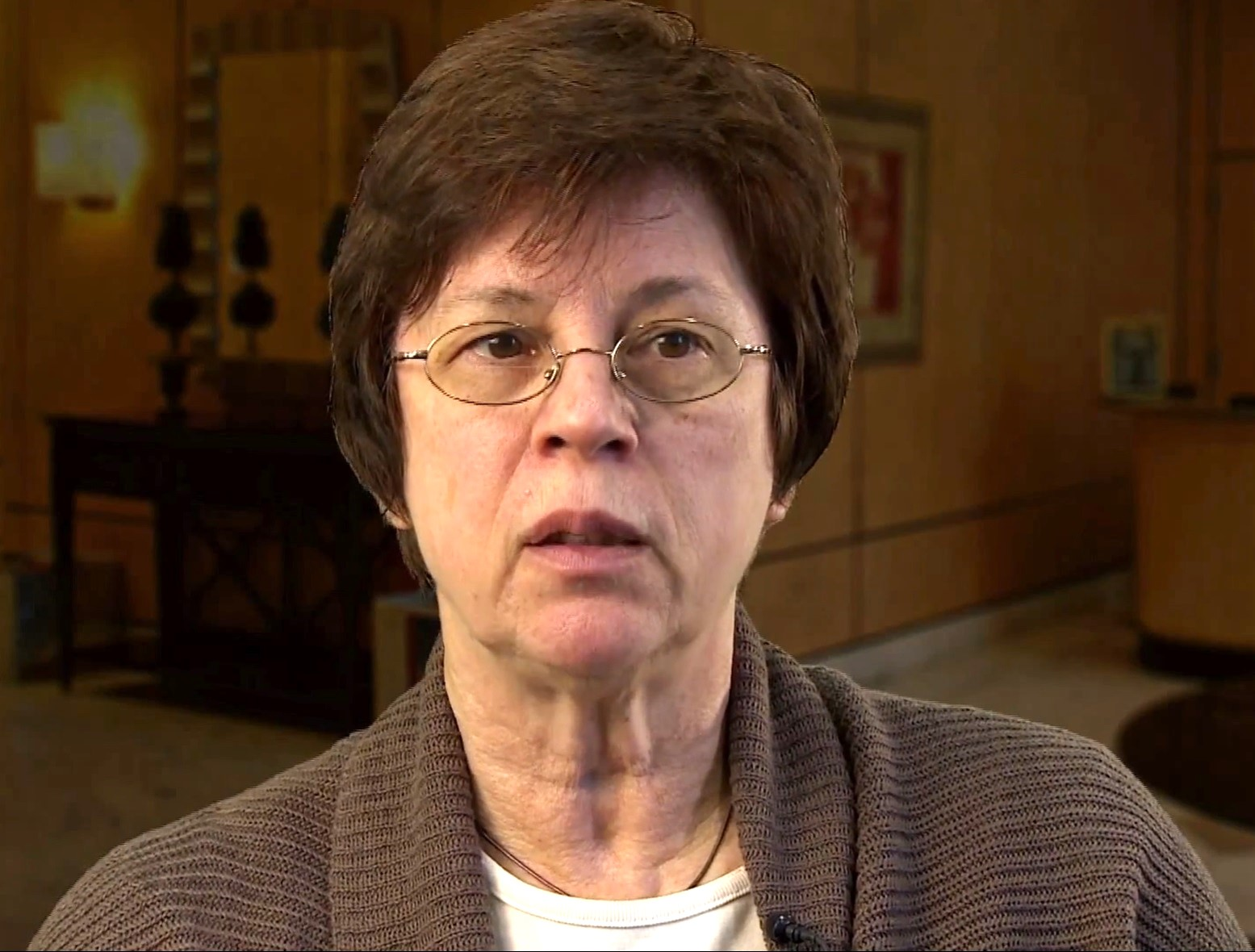
- Burke in 2013
- Born: Utica, NY
- Education: University of Washington
- Scientific career
- Fields: Genetics
- Workplaces: University of Washington, Northwest-Alaska Pharmacogenomics Research Network

External media

Audio
- “Wylie Burke on genomics, precision medicine, and healthcare policy”, podcast, Genome Alberta, July 10, 2015.

Video
- Risks and Benefits of Genetic Testing, Wylie Burke, University of Washington, November 22, 2013

Wylie Burke is a Professor Emerita and former Chair of the Department of Bioethics and Humanities at the University of Washington and a founding co-director of the Northwest-Alaska Pharmacogenomics Research Network, which partners with underserved populations in the Pacific Northwest and Alaska.

Burke's work focuses on ethical, legal, and social implications of genetic information for research and health care. She is an elected member of the National Academy of Medicine and the Association of American Physicians, and a past president of the American Society of Human Genetics.

== Early life and education ==
Burke attended Brooklyn College, graduating summa cum laude in 1970. She then studied at the University of Washington, receiving a PhD in Genetics in 1974 and completing her MD with a residency in Internal Medicine. Next she spent several years as a primary care doctor at a community hospital. Burke returned to the University of Washington as a Medical Genetics Fellow from 1981-1982.

== Career ==
Burke joined the Department of Medicine at the University of Washington in 1983. She served as the associate director of the Internal Medicine Residency Program from 1988 to 1994 and as the founding director of the Women’s Health Care Center at the University of Washington from 1994-1999. In 2000, she became director of the Department of Medical History and Ethics. It was renamed the Department of Bioethics and Humanities in 2008. Burke stepped down as chair in 2014.

Burke is now Professor Emerita of the University of Washington. She is also an adjunct professor of medicine and epidemiology and a member of the Fred Hutchinson Cancer Research Center. The Department of Bioethics & Humanities at the University of Washington has created an endowed scholarship for diversity in her name.

Burke was a visiting scientist at the Centers for Disease Control and Prevention in 1998. She served on the NIH National Advisory Council for Human Genome Research from 1999-2003 and the Department of Health and Human Services Advisory Committee on Genetic Testing from 1999-2002. Burke was the founding Principal Investigator of the University of Washington's Center for Genomics and Healthcare Equality from 2004–2017, one of the NIH Centers of Excellence in Ethical, Legal and Social Implications (ELSI) Research, which were funded by the National Human Genome Research Institute. She served on the National Academies' Committee on the Return of Individual-Specific Results Generated in Research Laboratories, which released a report in 2018 recommending guidelines for researchers and institutions.

Burke is a founding co-director with Ken Thummel of the Northwest-Alaska Pharmacogenomics Research Network. The network was formed in 2009 as a research partnership between tribal organizations and universities to study pharmacogenomics in rural and underserved populations in the Pacific Northwest and Alaska. It received funding from the National Institutes of Health (NIH). American Indian and Alaska Native (AI/AN) people are disproportionately likely to be designated as medically underserved, as a result of lower availability of primary care physicians and higher than average percentages for infant mortality, incomes below the poverty level, and people 65 years or older. Current university partners include the University of Washington, the University of Alaska Fairbanks, the Oregon Health & Science University, and the University of Montana.

Burke has been an international fellow at the National Health Service in Cambridge, United Kingdom. Burke was director of the American Society of Human Genetics (ASHG) from 2002 to 2004 and a member of its Social Issues Committee from 2004 to 2006. In 2007 she served as ASHG President.

== Research ==
Burke examines the ethical, legal, and social implications of human genetics. She is particularly concerned with the translation of novel genomic technologies from their development in the lab to their use in the health system and community. She is regarded as a national leader in ethics and policy dealing with human genome research, addressing fundamental and difficult questions with respect for those involved.

Among the issues of concern to Burke are clinical utility — what genetic information will be of help to a particular patient, how can this be determined, and are there potential harms to a patient? — and equity — are interventions which have clinical utility available to all who can benefit from it? Are diverse populations and individuals being taken into account?

== Awards ==
- 2021, Victor A. McKusick Leadership Award, American Society of Human Genetics (ASHG)
- 2016, Cowan Memorial Lecturer, University of Utah
- 2013-2014, Presidential Chair, University of California, San Francisco
- 2007, Member, Institute of Medicine (now National Academy of Medicine)
- 2006, NHS International Fellow, Public Health Genetics Unit, Cambridge UK
- Member, Association of American Physicians

== Publications ==
- Burke, Wylie (31 August 2021). "Utility and Diversity: Challenges for Genomic Medicine". Annual Review of Genomics and Human Genetics. 22 (1): 1–24. doi:10.1146/annurev-genom-120220-082640. ISSN 1527-8204. PMID 33792358. S2CID 232483454.
- Dorfman, Elizabeth H; Trinidad, Susan Brown; Morales, Chelsea T; Howlett, Kevin; Burke, Wylie; Woodahl, Erica L (2015). "Pharmacogenomics in diverse practice settings: implementation beyond major metropolitan areas". Pharmacogenomics. 16 (3): 227–237. doi:10.2217/pgs.14.174. ISSN 1462-2416. PMC 4360986. PMID 25712186.
- James, Rosalina; Tsosie, Rebecca; Sahota, Puneet; Parker, Myra; Dillard, Denise; Sylvester, Ileen; Lewis, John; Klejka, Joseph; Muzquiz, LeeAnna; Olsen, Polly; Whitener, Ron; Burke, Wylie (1 November 2014). "Exploring pathways to trust: a tribal perspective on data sharing". Genetics in Medicine. 16 (11): 820–826. doi:10.1038/gim.2014.47. ISSN 1098-3600. PMC 4224626. PMID 24830328.
- Burke, Wylie; Korngiebel, Diane M. (26 February 2015). "Closing the Gap between Knowledge and Clinical Application: Challenges for Genomic Translation". PLOS Genetics. 11 (2) e1004978. doi:10.1371/journal.pgen.1004978. PMC 4342348. PMID 25719903.
- Allen, James; Hopper, Kim; Wexler, Lisa; Kral, Michael; Rasmus, Stacy; Nystad, Kristine (21 August 2013). "Mapping resilience pathways of Indigenous youth in five circumpolar communities". Transcultural Psychiatry. 51 (5): 601–631. doi:10.1177/1363461513497232. ISSN 1363-4615. PMC 4065853. PMID 23965730.
- Fullerton, S. M.; Knerr, S.; Burke, W. (2012). "Finding a place for genomics in health disparities research". Public Health Genomics. 15 (3–4): 156–163. doi:10.1159/000334717. ISSN 1662-8063. PMC 3685214. PMID 22488458.
- Burke, Wylie; Edwards, Kelly A.; Goering, Sara; Holland, Suzanne; Brown Trinidad, Susan, eds. (2011). Achieving justice in genomic translation : re-thinking the pathway to benefit. Oxford: Oxford University Press, USA. ISBN 9780195390384.
- McGuire, Amy L.; Evans, Barbara J.; Caulfield, Timothy; Burke, Wylie (8 October 2010). "Regulating Direct-to-Consumer Personal Genome Testing". Science. 330 (6001): 181–182. doi:10.1126/science.1194006. PMID 20929761. S2CID 206528371.
- Khoury, Muin J.; Burke, Wylie; Thomson, Elizabeth (2000). Genetics and public health in the 21st century : using genetic information to improve health and prevent disease. Oxford: Oxford University Press. ISBN 9780195128307.
