= Institute of Genetics and Genomics of Geneva =

Swiss research institute

Coordinates: 46.199581°N 6.1395786°E

The Institute of Genetics and Genomics of Geneva, also known as iGE3, is a research institute in Geneva, Switzerland. The institute is affiliated with the University of Geneva and focuses on conducting biomedical research and teaching based on genetic and genomic scientific analysis. The abbreviation "iGE3" was devised by its former director Stylianos Antonarakis by combining "institute" and "GEnetics, GEnomics, GEneva". The institute's inauguration ceremony was held on February 8, 2012 and as of October 2020 the institute is directed by Emmanouil Dermitzakis.
