= Brian Bickell =

Alumni of the London School of Economics (born 1954)

Brian Bickell (born November 1954) was the chief executive of property firm Shaftesbury plc. He joined the firm in 1986 and was the first employee of the company. Bickell became finance director in 1987.
