= Lissy Jarvik =

Dutch-American geriatric psychiatrist (1924–2021)

- Born: Lissy Feingold; March 17, 1924; The Hague, Netherlands
- Died: October 1, 2021 (aged 97); Santa Monica, California, U.S.
- Education: Hunter College; Columbia University; Case Western Reserve University School of Medicine
- Spouse: Murray Jarvik (m. 1954; died 2008)
- Children: 2
- Scientific career
- Fields: Geriatric psychiatry
- Workplaces: University of California, Los Angeles
- Thesis: A psychometric study of senescent twins (1950)
- Academic advisors: Franz Josef Kallmann

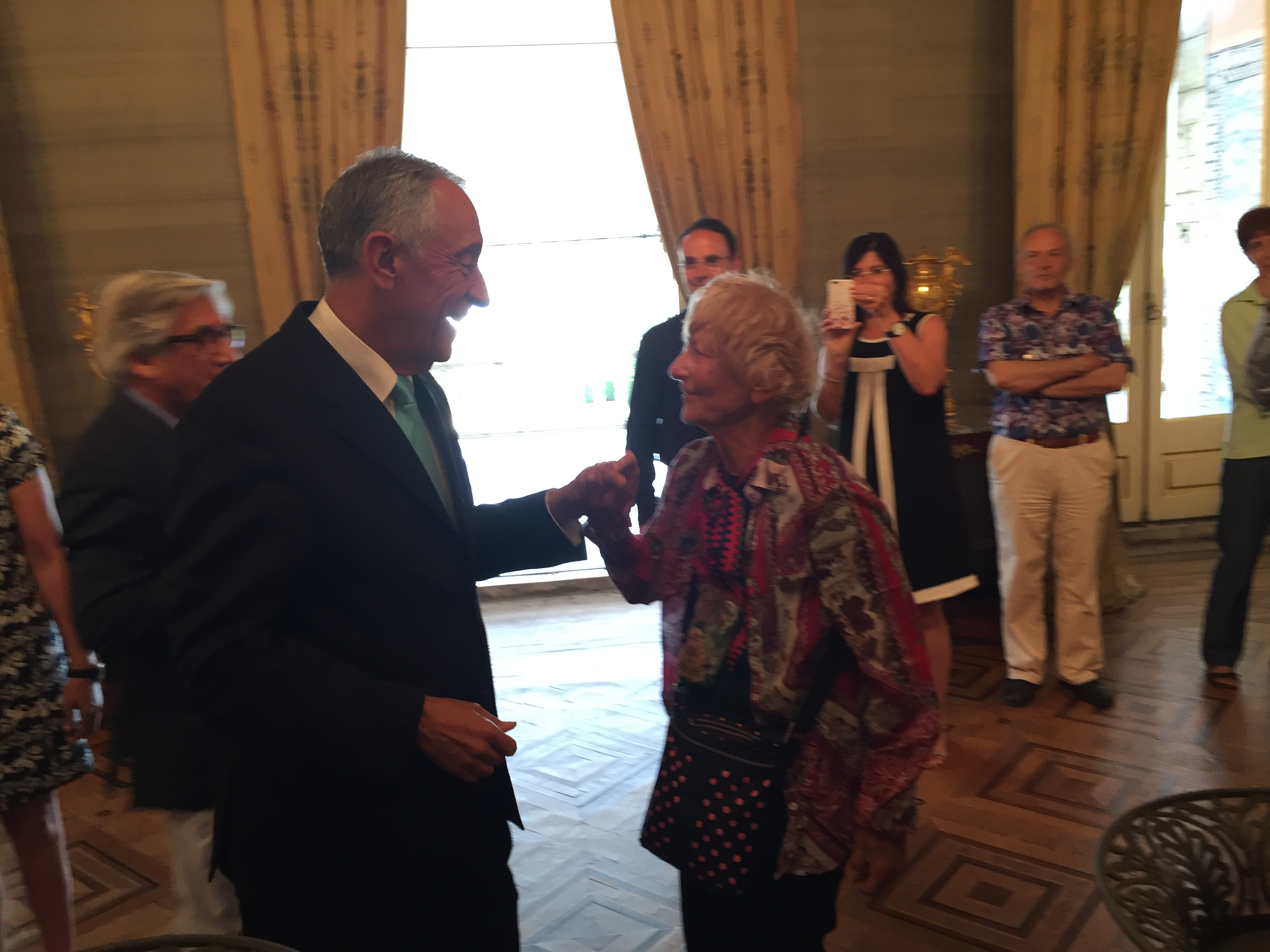
Portuguese President Marcelo Rebelo de Sousa greets Dr. Lissy F. Jarvik in 2016

Lissy Jarvik (née Feingold; March 17, 1924 – October 1, 2021) was a Dutch-born American geriatric psychiatrist. The National Library of Medicine featured her in their interactive "Changing the Face of Medicine" exhibit, describing her as "a pioneer in the field of neuropsychogeriatrics."

== Early life and education ==
Jarvik was born Lissy Feingold in the Hague, Netherlands on March 17, 1924. Her family was Jewish. In 1940, she and her family received a travel visa from Aristides de Sousa Mendes, which they used to flee the Netherlands for the United States. In 1946, she graduated cum laude from Hunter College. She went on to earn her master's degree and Ph.D. in psychology from Columbia University in 1947 and 1950, respectively. While studying for her doctorate at Columbia, she began working on a twin study with her mentor, Franz Josef Kallmann, with whom she traveled around New York to catalog medical and psychological data on twins. In 1954, she received her M.D. from Case Western Reserve University School of Medicine.

== Academic career ==
After receiving her medical degree, Jarvik began working at both the psychiatry department at Columbia University and the New York State Psychiatric Institute. She became a professor of psychiatry and biobehavioral sciences at the University of California, Los Angeles (UCLA) in 1972, remaining on the faculty as an emeritus professor there until her death. While at UCLA, she founded the first in-patient psychogeriatrics unit at the hospital there, as well as the first behavioral science course for students in their first year of medical training. She also founded the first inpatient psychogeriatrics unit in the Department of Veterans Affairs during this time. In the early 1980s, she started a geriatric psychiatry fellowship, in which fellows would be trained at the Los Angeles Jewish Home for the Aging. In 1987, she was a founding co-editor-in-chief of the medical journal Alzheimer Disease & Associated Disorders. Also in 1987, she was named a Distinguished Physician in the Department of Veterans Affairs, a position she held until 1993. She was a fellow of the Center for Advanced Study in the Behavioral Sciences at Stanford University in 1988–89. In 1993, she was named the first recipient of the William C. Menninger Memorial Award from the American College of Physicians. In 2015, she and Bruce D. Walker were jointly awarded the Distinguished Alumni/ae Award from Case Western Reserve University School of Medicine.

== Personal life ==
Jarvik (then Feingold) married Murray Jarvik in 1954; they had two children together, Laurence and Jeffrey. She was a heavy smoker; in contrast, he never smoked and instead co-invented the nicotine patch. They remained married until his death in 2008.

Jarvik was the first president and co-founder of the Sousa Mendes Foundation which honors the memory of Portuguese Consul Aristides de Sousa Mendes, who saved thousands of refugees from Hitler during World War II.

She died in Santa Monica, California, on October 1, 2021, at the age of 97.
