= Neil Risch =

American geneticist

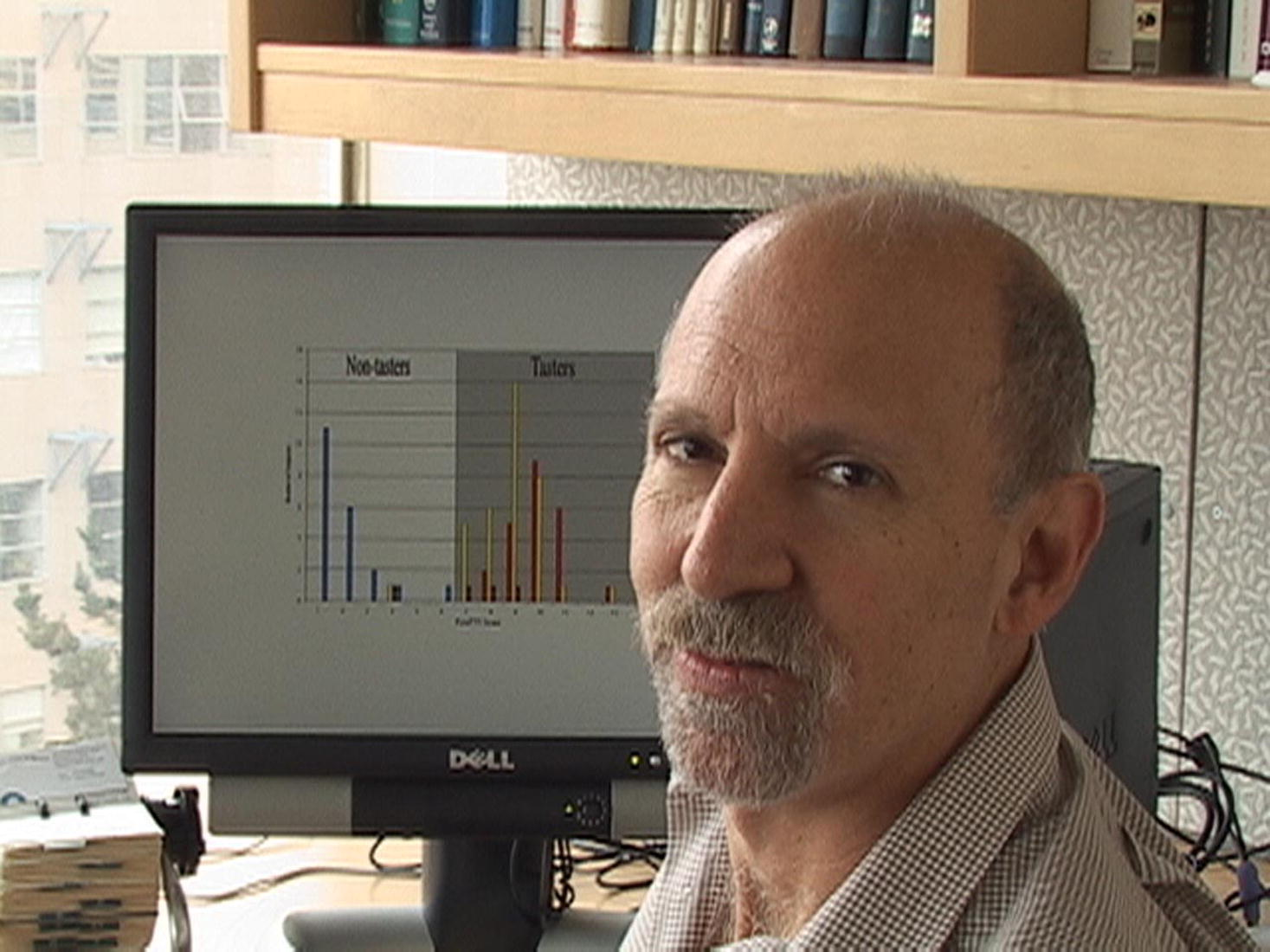
- Education: California Institute of Technology (BS); University of California, Los Angeles (PhD)
- Known for: Emphasizing links between population genetics and clinical application
- Awards: Curt Stern Award, American Society of Human Genetics; William Allan Award, American Society of Human Genetics; Paul Hoch Award, American Psychopathological Association
- Scientific career
- Fields: Statistical genetics
- Institutions: Columbia University; Yale University; Stanford University; University of California, San Francisco

Neil Risch is an American human geneticist and professor at the University of California, San Francisco (UCSF). Risch is the Lamond Family Foundation Distinguished Professor in Human Genetics, Founding Director of the Institute for Human Genetics, and Professor of Epidemiology and Biostatistics at UCSF. He specializes in statistical genetics, genetic epidemiology and population genetics.

Risch received undergraduate training in mathematics at the California Institute of Technology (1972) and his PhD in biomathematics at UCLA (1979). Prior to his position at UCSF, he held professorial positions at Columbia University, Yale University and Stanford University. He has been referred to as "the statistical geneticist of our time."

Known for his work on numerous genetic diseases including torsion dystonia, Risch emphasizes the links between population genetics and clinical application, believing that understanding human population history and disease susceptibility go hand in hand.

== Population genetics ==
Risch has conducted significant work on the nature of human differences on a geographical scale. For instance, he used social and genetic data to analyse genetic admixture from White, African, and Native American ancestry in Puerto Rico, as well as relating this to geographical variation in social status.

Risch considers that genetic drift is a more compelling explanation for the carrier frequency of lysosomal storage diseases in Ashkenazi Jews than heterozygote advantage, in light of analysis of the results of recent genetic testing by his collaborators and himself.

After mapping torsion dystonia by linkage disequilibrium (LD) analysis he found it was genetically dominant and was a founder mutation. Other work has focused on the genetic basis of Parkinson's disease, hemochromatosis, multiple sclerosis, diabetes, autism, epilepsy and hypertension.

== Group structure ==
Risch has worked on the genetic structure of human groups, for instance multiple levels of structure above the level of the individual increasing in scale up to the level of race. He has translated these results into theoretical impacts on, for instance, rate of decay of linkage disequilibrium, and practical application in personalised medicine. For instance, using the Framingham data, he showed that population stratification leads not only to fewer heterozygotes than predicted from Hardy–Weinberg equilibrium but also to spouses sharing genotypes at all ancestrally informative markers, accounted for by ancestry-related assortative mating in the previous generation.

== Psychiatric disease ==
In a small twin study on Autism (around 50 twin pairs for each disease and zygosity), he argued these disorders may be less heritable than previously considered, implicating a significant family-level environment effect. Similar findings were observed in family studies

== Homosexuality ==
Risch has been a prominent critic of studies on the role of genetics in sexual orientation. In 1999, with colleagues he published a sib-pair study that failed to replicate a previously observed linkage between male sexual orientation and Xq28 DNA markers. While an independent study also found evidence at the same Xq28 location, more recent very large studies failed to produce any evidence of a genetic effect in this region of the X chromosome. Risch also discussed ethical issues underlying studies of socially significant traits and the under-representation of minority scientists in human genetics in his 2015 ASHG Presidential Address, which received a standing ovation.

== Genome-wide Association Studies ==
With his colleague Kathleen Merikangas, Risch is possibly best known for introducing the concept of genome-wide association studies for the discovery and characterization of genetic variants of modest effects underlying complex diseases. That insight revolutionized the field of human genetics, leading to a large number of genome-wide association studies and the discovery of thousands of genetic variants underlying a broad range of diseases and traits.

Risch is also known, with his colleague Catherine Schaefer, for pioneering the linkage of genome-wide genotype data to electronic health records in a large health provider database (at Kaiser Permanente Northern California), which also demonstrated the power of genome-wide association studies on a large scale.

== Awards ==
Risch has received numerous awards and recognition for his scholarship. He is an elected fellow of the American Association for the Advancement of Science (2010), the California Academy of Sciences (2011), and a member of the National Academy of Medicine (2010). He was the 2015 President of the American Society of Human Genetics, the 2004 recipient of the Curt Stern Award (now the Scientific Achievement Award) from the American Society of Human Genetics and the 2023 recipient of the Lifetime Achievement Award (formerly the William Allan Award) from the American Society of Human Genetics, to date the only individual to have received both. He was also the 2022 recipient of the Paul Hoch Award from the American Psychopathological Association.
