= Jorden =

Jorden is a surname. Notable people with the surname include:

- Edward Jorden (1569–1633), English physician and chemist
- Edwin J. Jorden (1863–1903), American politician; congressman from Pennsylvania
- Eleanor Jorden (1920–2009), American linguistics scholar and Japanese language educator; wife of William
- James Jorden (contemporary), American journalist, music critic, and opera director
- Tim Jorden (born 1966), American professional football player
- William Jorden (1923–2009), American news correspondent, ambassador, and author; husband of Eleanor
