= DNA Day =

Holiday celebrated on April 25

National DNA Day
- Observed by: Biologists, science teachers and students, anyone interested in genetics
- Significance: The day celebrates the discovery and understanding of DNA and the scientific advances that understanding has made possible.
- Celebrations: Various
- Date: April 25
- Next time: 25 April 2027
- Frequency: Annual

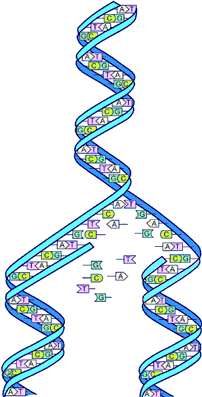
DNA replication. The two base-pair complementary chains of the DNA molecule allow for replication of the genetic instructions.

National DNA Day is a United States holiday celebrated on April 25. It commemorates the day in 1953 when James Watson, Francis Crick, Maurice Wilkins, Rosalind Franklin and colleagues published papers in the journal Nature on the structure of DNA. Furthermore, in early April 2003 it was declared that the Human Genome Project was very close to complete, and "the remaining tiny gaps were considered too costly to fill."

In the United States, DNA Day was first celebrated on April 25, 2003, by proclamation of both the Senate and the House of Representatives. However, they only declared a one-time celebration, not an annual holiday. Every year from 2003 onward, annual DNA Day celebrations have been organized by the National Human Genome Research Institute (NHGRI), starting as early as April 23 in 2010, April 15 in 2011 and April 20 in 2012. April 25 has since been declared "International DNA Day" and "World DNA Day" by several groups.

Genealogical DNA testing companies and genetic genealogy publishers run annual sales around DNA Day, seeking interest from the public and promoting their services.
