= Emmanouil Dermitzakis =

Greek human genetics researcher

Emmanouil T. Dermitzakis
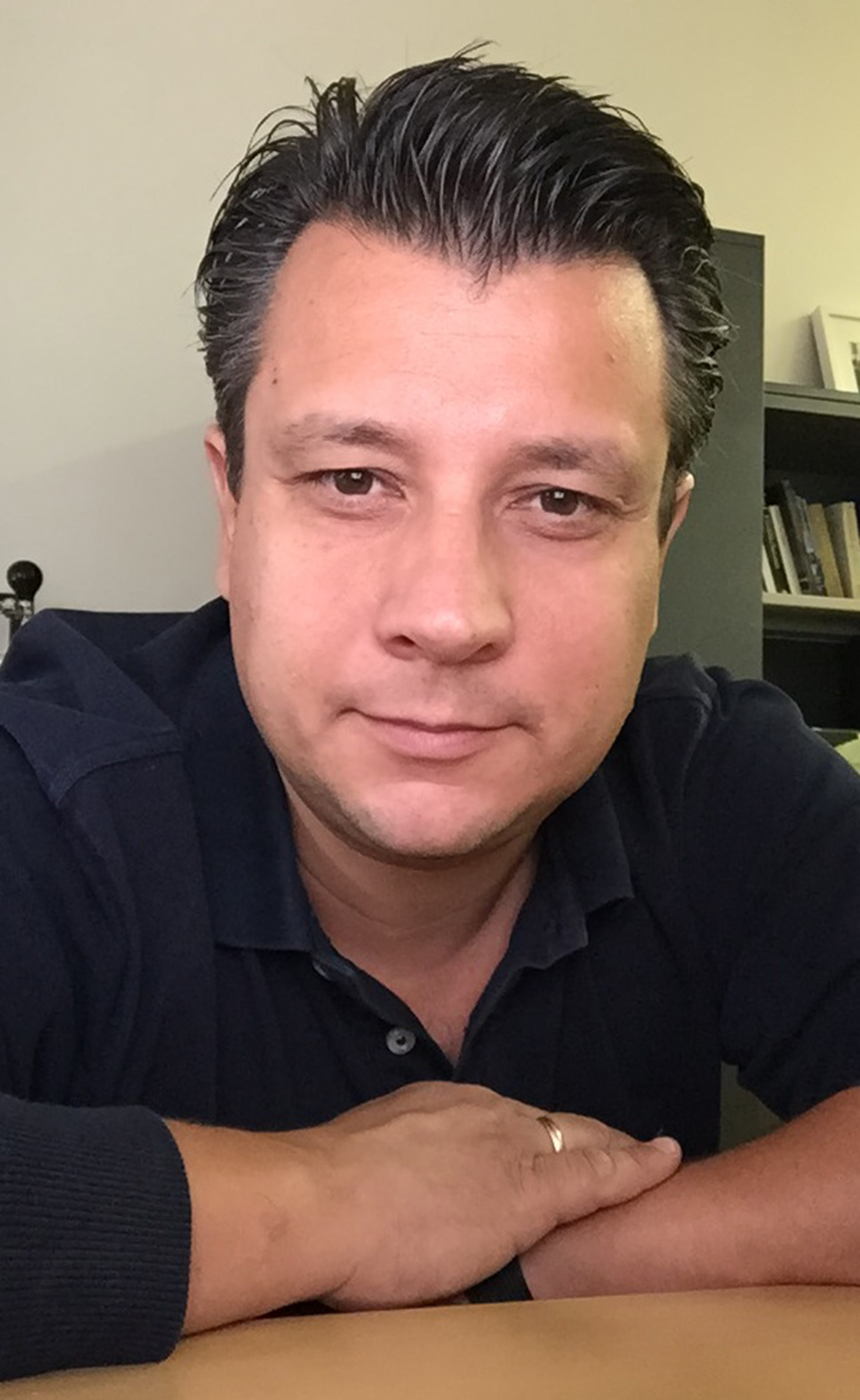
- Born: Emmanouil Theophilos Dermitzakis; April 3, 1972 (age 54)
- Other name: Manolis
- Education: University of Crete; Pennsylvania State University
- Children: 3
- Scientific career
- Fields: Genomics; Population genetics
- Institutions: University of Geneva
- Thesis: Evolution of components of gene regulation in Drosophila and mammals (2001)
- Doctoral advisor: Andrew G. Clark

Emmanouil Theophilos Dermitzakis (born April 3, 1972) is a Greek human geneticist and the President of the Qatar Precision Health Institute. He is also co-founder and the CEO of Antithesis Therapeutics. Previously, he was Vice President and Head of Computational Biology at GSK.. A former professor in the Department of Genetic Medicine and Development at the University of Geneva, where he was also Director of the Health 2030 Genome Center. He is an ISI Highly Cited Researcher and an elected member of the European Molecular Biology Organization.

== Early life and education ==
Dermitzakis graduated from High School in Pagrati, Athens. His dream of becoming a geneticist was spurred by two pages on genetic engineering in a Biology book in the school curriculum. His father was a physician and former classmate of professor Fotis Kafatos, who inspired him to later enter the field of research.

Dermitzakis completed his graduate degree in Biology at the University of Crete in 1995 and then earned a Master of Science at the same University in 1997. During an interview he confessed that he did not achieve a high score in his first degree, nevertheless his drive for research helped him pursue doctoral studies in the USA. He completed his doctoral thesis in the evolution of components of gene regulation in Drosophila and mammals at Penn State University in 2001. He then completed postdoctoral studies at the Medical School of the University of Geneva in 2004 with his research on comparative genome analysis and the functional characterization of conserved non-genic elements.

== Career ==
After completing his studies Dermitzakis moved to the United Kingdom, where he worked as a group leader and member of the academic council at the Wellcome Sanger Institute from 2004 to 2009. He continued his research career in Switzerland, as Professor of Genetics in the Department of Genetic Medicine and Development at the University of Geneva and in research centres including Frontiers in Genetics and the Swiss Institute of Bioinformatics in Geneva. He has served as Director of the Health 2030 Genome Center and is a member of the Biomedical Research Foundation of the Academy of Athens in Greece. In November 2019 he was appointed chairman of the Greek National Council for Research, Technology and Innovation, however a few months later he resigned, having said that his role on the council was merely decorative. In October 2020 he was appointed Director of the Institute of Genetics and Genomics of Geneva (known also as iGE3).

== Distinctions ==
Dermitzakis has published over 160 papers in peer-reviewed scientific journals such as Nature and Science with over 89,000 citations. Before the age of 40 he was already on the Thomson Reuters Highly Cited Researchers list in the field of Molecular Biology and Genetics. His research has been funded by the European Research Council (ERC), the European Union, the Swiss National Science Foundation, the American National Institutes of Health (NIH), the Wellcome Trust, the Juvenile Diabetes Research Foundation (JDRF) and the Louis-Jeantet Foundation. Dermitzakis has earned numerous awards and continues to appear on the ISI Highly Cited Researchers List every year from 2014 onward.

== Scientific contributions ==
Dermitzakis has been one of the first scientists to reveal the importance of non-coding DNA in evolution and disease susceptibility. His papers on the evolution of regulatory elements showed the dynamic nature of regulatory sequences. His group has pioneered the analysis of non-coding regulatory variants in the human genome and their effect on gene expression regulation, chromatin patterns and regulatory interactions and 3D genome interactions in cis and trans regulatory variants and how they are impacting cellular function as well as disease susceptibility and cancer.

He has participated in international genetics projects such as ENCODE, HapMap, GTEx and more recently in the International Common Disease Alliance (ICDA).

== Personal life ==
Manolis Dermitzakis is married to attorney Ria Kechagia and the couple have three children.
