= Gustav Bickell =

German orientalist

Gustav Bickell (7 July 1838 – 15 January 1906) was a German orientalist. He was born in Kassel, and died in Vienna.

His father, Johann Wilhelm Bickell, was professor of canon law at the University of Marburg, and died (1848) as minister of justice of Hesse-Kassel (or Hesse-Cassel). In 1862 Gustav became Privatdozent of Semitic and Indo-Germanic languages at Marburg, but the following year he went in the same capacity to the University of Giessen. The finding of a clear testimony in favour of the Immaculate Conception in the hymns of Ephrem the Syrian, which he was transcribing in London, led him to enter the Catholic Church, 5 Nov., 1865. After his conversion he entered the seminary of Fulda, where he was ordained priest on 22 September 1865.

He then taught Semitic languages at the Academy of Münster, and in 1871 was appointed extraordinary professor. At this period he became widely known by his vigorous defence of papal infallibility. In 1874 he went to the University of Innsbruck as professor of Christian archaeology and Semitic languages, which position he held until 1891, when he was called to the chair of Semitic languages at the University of Vienna.

== Publications ==
He was an enthusiastic student and one of the foremost Semitic scholars of his times. Besides numerous contributions to different reviews he published the following works:

- De indole ac ratione versionis Alexandrinæ in interpretando libri Jobi (Marburg, 1862)
- S. Ephraemi Syri Carmina Nisibena, with prolegomena fixing the laws of Syriac metre (Leipzig, 1866)
- Grundriss der hebräischen Grammatik (ib., 1869–70), translated into English by Sam. I. Curtiss under the title Outlines of Hebrew Grammar (ib., 1877)
- Gründe für die Unfehlbarkeit des Kirchenoberhauptes (Münster, 1870)
- Conspectus rei Syrorum litterariæ (ib., 1871)
- Messe und Pascha (Mainz, 1872), tr. W. F. Skene, The Lord's Supper and the Passover (Edinburgh, 1891)
- Schriften und Gedichte syrischer Kirchenväter (vols. 71 and 72 of the Sammlung der Kirchenväter of Kempten)
- S. Isaaci Antiocheni opera omnia (2 vols., Giessen, 1873–77)
- Kalilag und Damnag (Leipzig, 1876), an edition and translation into German of the earliest extant translation (into Syriac) of the Panchatantra
- Metrices biblicae regulæ exemplis illustratae (Innsbruck, 1879)
- Synodi brixinenses saec. quindecimi (ib., 1880)
- Carmina V. T. metrice (ib., 1882)
- Dichtungen de Hebraer (3 vols., ib., 1882–84)
- Der Prediger (Koheleth) über den Wert des Dasiens (ib., 1886)
- Das Buch Job (Vienna, 1894)
