= Murray Jarvik =

American pharmacologist

- Born: Murray Elias Jarvik; June 1, 1923; New York City, U.S.
- Died: May 8, 2008 (aged 84); Santa Monica, California, U.S.
- Education: University of California, San Francisco; University of California, Berkeley; University of California, Los Angeles; City College of New York
- Known for: Co-inventor of the nicotine patch
- Spouse: Lissy Feingold (m. 1954)
- Children: 2
- Scientific career
- Fields: Psychiatry; Psychopharmacology
- Workplaces: University of California, Los Angeles
- Thesis: A study of some factors involved in probability discrimination (1952)
- Doctoral advisor: Edward Chace Tolman

Murray Elias Jarvik (June 1, 1923 – May 8, 2008) was an American psychopharmacologist and academic who was among the first scientists to study d-lysergic acid, the precursor to LSD, and later became the co-inventor of the nicotine patch. He was a longtime professor emeritus at University of California-Los Angeles, where he taught as a professor of psychiatry and pharmacology for many years.

== Personal life ==
Murray Jarvik was born in the Bronx, New York City on June 1, 1923. He was the son of Minnie (Haas) and Jacob Jarvik, an upholsterer. Jarvik suffered from lifelong heart problems, which began with a severe case of rheumatic fever when he was twelve years old. He later developed polio at the age of 28 and was diagnosed with lung cancer in 1992, which was cured. He was never a smoker.

Jarvik received his undergraduate bachelor's degree at the City College of New York before earning his master's degree in science at University of California, Los Angeles, his PhD from the University of California, Berkeley, and his MD from the University of California, San Francisco.

He was married to his wife, Lissy Jarvik, for 53 years, and the couple had two sons. His son Laurence Jarvik made the documentary film Who Shall Live and Who Shall Die about the inaction of the Roosevelt Administration during the time of the Holocaust. His other son, Dr. Jeffrey G. Jarvik is Professor of Neuroradiology at the University of Washington School of Medicine. His nephew Robert Jarvik developed the first artificial heart, called Jarvik-7. His other nephew, Dr. Jonathan W. Jarvik, is Professor of Biological Sciences at Carnegie Mellon University and founder of SpectraGenetics.

== Nicotine patch ==
Murray Jarvik began research into the absorption of tobacco contents through the skin and its effects on the human body. His initial exploration into this field began by studying farmers and farmhands in the American South who harvest tobacco by hand for a living.

However, Jarvik and his colleague, then UCLA postdoctoral fellow Jed Rose, could not get approval to conduct their research into tobacco absorption through the skin on human subjects. Instead, Jarvik and Rose began testing the effects of absorption of tobacco contents on themselves. The effects of the tobacco was immediately measurable. In an interview with UCLA Magazine, Jarvik remembered, "We put the tobacco on our skin and waited to see what would happen. Our heart rates increased, adrenaline began pumping, all the things that happen to smokers."

Jarvik and Rose's research led to their invention of the nicotine patch in the early 1990s. The nicotine patch is a transdermal patch that delivers nicotine directly through the skin and into the body to alleviate the urge to smoke and, hopefully, ultimately quit smoking. (Rose now serves as the director of the Center for Nicotine and Smoking Cessation Research at Duke University.)

The nicotine patch became available by prescription for smoking cessation in the United States in 1992. The Food and Drug Administration (FDA) approved its sale as an over-the-counter treatment in 1996.

== Death ==
Murray Jarvik died at his home in Santa Monica, California, on May 8, 2008, at the age of 84 from a pulmonary edema from congestive heart failure.
