= Lynn Jorde =

American geneticist

Lynn B. Jorde
- Education: University of New Mexico
- Spouse: Debbie Jorde
- Children: 2 stepchildren Heather Madsen and Logan Madsen
- Awards: 12 teaching awards from the University of Utah School of Medicine, co-recipient of the American Society of Human Genetics' 2008 Award for Excellence in Education, elected a fellow of the American Association for the Advancement of Science in 2012
- Scientific career
- Fields: Human genetics
- Workplaces: University of Utah School of Medicine
- Thesis: The genetic structure of the Åland Islands, Finland (1979)

Lynn B. Jorde is an American human geneticist. He is a professor in, and chair of, the Department of Human Genetics at the University of Utah School of Medicine, where he holds a H.A. and Edna Benning Presidential Endowed Chair.

== Career ==
Jorde joined the faculty of the University of Utah in 1979. He became the chair of their Department of Human Genetics in 2009. He served as the president of the American Society of Human Genetics from 2011 to 2012.

== Research ==
Jorde's research focuses on multiple areas in the field of human genetics, including human population genetics. For example, a 2010 study by him and his colleagues found that human genetic diversity was very low about 1 million years ago, and that early humans almost went extinct as a result. He has also studied the genetic basis for, among other conditions, hypertension, inflammatory bowel disease, and congenital limb malformations.

== Personal life ==
Jorde is married to Debbie Jorde, who has two children, Heather Madsen and Logan Madsen from a previous marriage, both of whom have the rare genetic conditions of primary ciliary dyskinesia and Miller syndrome. After marrying Debbie, Professor Jorde decided to map the genome of his wife, her two children, Heather and Logan Madsen, and the children's biological father in order to determine the cause of these conditions, which were later determined to be genetic. This family later became the first family to have their entire genome sequenced.
