= Lee M. Silver =

Lee M. Silver (born 1952) is an American biologist. He is a professor at Princeton University in the Department of molecular biology and the Princeton School of Public and International Affairs. He also has joint appointments in the Program in Science, Technology, and Environmental Policy, the Center for Health and Wellbeing, the Office of Population Research, and the Princeton Environmental Institute, all at Princeton University.

== Contributions ==
Silver is the author of the book Remaking Eden: How Genetic Engineering and Cloning Will Transform the American Family (1998). In the book he takes a positive view on human cloning, designer babies and similar prospects. In this book he coined the term reprogenetics to describe the prospective fusion of reproductive technologies and genetics, which will allow positive eugenic actions on an individual level.

Silver's most recent book was Challenging Nature: The Clash of Science and Spirituality at the New Frontiers of Life (June 2006).

Silver is the co-founder of GenePeeks, a genetic research company which owns a simulation for screening genetic disorders.
