= Peter H. Byers =

American medical researcher

Peter H. Byers is an American geneticist, physician, and researcher of connective tissue disorders. He is a professor of medicine, a professor of pathology, and an adjunct professor of genome sciences at the University of Washington.

== Biography ==
Byers graduated from Case Western Reserve University School of Medicine in 1974. He then trained at the University of Washington School of Medicine as a fellow in medical genetics and biochemistry before joining the faculty in 1977. He has remained at the University of Washington through the duration of his career.

== Career ==
Byers' research has involved understanding mutations in the gene encoding collagen their impact on human diseases involving connective tissue. He is considered a leading expert on human connective tissue disorders.

In addition to identifying specific genes and mutations underlying various connective tissue disorders, Byers' work established parental mosaicism as an underlying cause that genetically dominant disorders could be born to parents who were unaffected by such diseases.

Byers helped to found the field of molecular genetic pathology, and has had leadership roles in multiple professional organizations relevant to that discipline.

== Awards ==
- March of Dimes/Colonel Harland Sanders Award for lifetime achievement in the field of genetic sciences
- Victor A. McKusick Leadership Award
