= Clarke Fraser =

Canadian medical geneticist (1920–2014)

Frank Clarke Fraser OC, FRSC
- Born: 29 March 1920; Norwich, Connecticut, US
- Died: 17 December 2014 (aged 94); Digby, Nova Scotia, Canada
- Education: Munro College, Jamaica; Acadia University, Nova Scotia; McGill University
- Occupation: Medical geneticist
- Known for: Multifactorial threshold model that underlies some familial conditions
- Awards: Order of Canada; William Allan Award
- Scientific career
- Fields: Medicine, genetics
- Institutions: Royal Canadian Air Force, McGill University

Frank Clarke Fraser OC FRSC (29 March 1920 – 17 December 2014) was a Canadian medical geneticist. Spanning the fields of science and medicine, he was Canada's first medical geneticist, one of the creators of the discipline of medical genetics in North America, and laid the foundations in the field of Genetic Counselling, which has enhanced the lives of patients worldwide. Among his many accomplishments, Fraser pioneered work in the genetics of cleft palate and popularized the concept of multifactorial disease.

== Biography ==
Born in Norwich, Connecticut, he returned with his family to Canada when he was an infant. After a few years in Dublin, where his father, Frank Wise Fraser was Canadian Trade Commissioner, the family moved to Jamaica, where he received his primary and secondary school education at Munro College. He received a Bachelor of Science degree in 1940 from Acadia University, a Master of Science degree in 1941, a Ph.D. in 1945, and a Doctor of Medicine degree in 1950 from McGill University. During World War II, he served in the Royal Canadian Air Force but did not go overseas.

Before Fraser took the stage, genetics and medicine were two very separate fields. There was no vision for the potential of genetics in human medicine. But very soon, Fraser turned his attention from fruit flies and mice to human genetics, and became the founder of the first Canadian medical genetics department in a paediatric hospital, named the F. Clarke Fraser Clinical Genetics Centre at McGill University in 1995.

- 1950: joined McGill University as an assistant professor of genetics.
- 1955: appointed an Associate and in 1960 was made a full professor.
- 1970-82 was the Molson Professor of Genetics in the Department of Biology.
- 1973–82, was also a professor of Paediatrics.
- 1979–82, Professor in the McGill Centre for Human Genetics.
- 1979 Founding co-director of the Medical Research Council of Canada Group in Medical Genetics, the longest lasting group in the history of the MRC.
- 1952-82 Founder and Director of the Department of Medical Genetics at the Montreal Children's Hospital.
- 1982–85, Professor of Clinical Genetics at Memorial University of Newfoundland.
- 1990–93, Director of the Genetics Working Group of the Royal Commission on New Reproductive Technologies.

Fraser has served as president of the major North American societies in Genetics and Teratology and has won almost every award in his field.

- 1966 Fellow of the Royal Society of Canada.
- 1984 Officer of the Order of Canada.
- 1999 Government of Quebec's Prix Wilder-Penfield, awarded for achievement in the biomedical sciences.
- 2012 Elected to the Canadian Medical Hall of Fame.

He has been awarded four honorary doctorates, from Acadia University (1967), SUNY at Potsdam, Dalhousie University (2003) and McGill University (2010).

Fraser made contributions in three areas. He collected data on recurrence risks for a number of pediatric conditions, to answer the questions of the parents of affected children. He helped develop the principles of genetic counseling. He showed that cortisone, injected into pregnant mice, caused cleft palates in the offspring, and that the frequency of induced clefts varied with the genotype, thus bringing genetics into teratology. From this he developed the multifactorial threshold model that underlies many common familial conditions. Fraser died in Digby, Nova Scotia on 17 December 2014.
