= Curt Stern =

German-American geneticist

- Born: 30 August 1902; Hamburg, Germany
- Died: 23 October 1981 (aged 79); Sacramento, California
- Education: Kaiser-Wilhelm-Institut (PhD), University of Berlin
- Known for: Demonstrating crossover of homologous chromosomes in Drosophila melanogaster
- Spouse: Evelyn Sommerfield
- Children: Three daughters
- Scientific career
- Workplaces: University of Berlin, California Institute of Technology, Case Western Reserve University, University of Rochester, University of California at Berkeley
- Doctoral advisor: Max Hartmann

Curt Stern (August 30, 1902 – October 23, 1981) was a German-born American geneticist.

== Life ==
Curt Jacob Stern was born into a middle-class Jewish family in Hamburg, Germany on August 30, 1902. He was the first son of Earned S. Stern, born 1862 in England, who was interned during World War I, and Anna Stern, née Anna Liebrecht who was a schoolteacher (b. 1873). Her father C. Liebrecht was a teacher at the Israelitische Gemeindeschule Gleiwitz, a "Gymnasium" in Upper Silesia, with a PhD in mathematics and natural sciences at the University of Breslau. His father dealt in antiques and dental supplies, and his mother was a schoolteacher. The family moved to a suburb in Berlin shortly after his birth. As a child, he showed a strong interest in biology and natural history. He went to the "Hindenburgschule" in Berlin-Oberschoeneweide. Supported by two high school teachers and his parents, he decided to study zoology. He entered the University of Berlin in 1920 at age 18.

Stern conducted his doctoral studies at the Kaiser Wilhelm Institute, which was a one- to two-hour commute each way from his home. He chose the lab of Max Hartmann, a protozoologist, to study the reproduction of a protozoan of the order Heliozoa. In 1923 after only 3 years, he received a Ph.D. for the description of its mitosis, the youngest person to receive a Ph.D. from the university at that time. "To achieve his degree so early under these circumstances was an early, clear signal of the remarkable combination of high intellectual ability, photographic memory, and stamina that was to characterize his career."

Stern had read and critiqued a paper on the basis for crossing-over by Richard Goldschmidt, the 45-year-old director of the Kaiser Wilhelm Institute for Biology. Six months later Goldschmidt returned the critique to Stern without comment, called him into his office and offered him a post-graduate fellowship financed by the Rockefeller University at Columbia University, N.Y. to study genetics in Thomas Hunt Morgan's lab, the famous "Fly Room", so-named for the fruit fly Drosophila, the subject of genetic research for Morgan.

Stern lived in New York City from 1924 to 1926. In 1926 his very first paper written in English was published in the prestigious Proceedings of the National Academy of Sciences. After his fellowship, Stern returned to his alma mater, the University of Berlin, where he stayed for six very productive years from 1926 to 1932 as an investigator until he became a professor in 1928. There, he wrote the first two of his 5 books (Multiple Allelie, Handbuch der Vererbungswissenschaften, I. 147 pp. Berlin: Gebr. Borntraeger, 1930. and Faktorenkoppelung und Faktorenaustausch, 1933) and 35 papers. Most articles were about Drosophila genetics, but two hinted at areas he would pick up much later: one 1928 article delved into the topic of human genetics, and another one from 1929 about mutagenic effects of radiation.

On October 29, 1931, Curt Stern married Evelyn Sommerfield, an American citizen, whom he had met 1925 at Columbia University. During 1932 he returned to the U.S. for a one-year fellowship from the Rockefeller Foundation, spent at the California Institute of Technology. He was in the company of geneticists Thomas Morgan, Alfred Henry Sturtevant, Theodosius Dobzhansky, Calvin Bridges, Rollins Adams Emerson, C.D. Darlington, Berwind P. Kaufmann, Drosophila geneticist Jack Schultz, and yeast geneticist Carl C. Lindegren. The year 1933 marks the year both of his last publication in German for 22 years to come, the year Hitler had come to power and Curt and Evelyn's decision to live in the US. Evelyn had returned to Germany to investigate in-person whether or not it was safe for him to return to Germany, seeking advice from his academic colleagues. The decision was forced by Hitler enacting an Aryan paragraph in April 1933 limiting public service to Aryans.

After a temporary position at Case Western Reserve University in 1933, he accepted a research associate position at University of Rochester the same year, where he moved through the ranks to assistant professor in 1937, and then to associate professor from 1937 to 1941. He became an American citizen in 1939. Curt and Evelyn had three daughters: Hildegard (1935), Holly Elizabeth (1938), and Barbara Ellen. Stern had brought his parents to live with his family in what became a suburb of Rochester, Brighton, Monroe County, New York. In 1941 Stern had become a full professor. From 1941 to 1947 he was chairman of the Department of Zoology and chairman of the Division of Biological Sciences.

After 11 years in NY state, he left for Berkeley in 1947, age 45 to follow in the footsteps of his mentor Richard Golschmidt at the University of California at Berkeley where he had numerous doctoral students until his retirement in 1970.

Stern was elected to the American Philosophical Society in 1954.

Curt Stern was diagnosed with Parkinson's disease in 1970. His last public address was in 1973. Within 4 years his intellectual abilities had declined to such a degree, that he would not speak publicly anymore. He died of complications of Parkinson's disease, i.e. cardiac failure on October 23, 1981, in Sacramento, CA at the age of 79.

== Career ==
In 1931, Stern was the first to demonstrate crossover of homologous chromosomes in Drosophila melanogaster, only weeks after Barbara McClintock and Harriet Creighton had done so in maize (corn).

In 1936, he demonstrated that recombination can also take place in mitosis resulting in somatic mosaics, organisms that contain two or more genetically distinct types of tissues. He later demonstrated that there were multiple genes on the Drosophila Y chromosome, and described the mechanism of dosage compensation.

After World War II had begun, Stern fully entered the field of human genetics, supervising his first graduate student seminar in 1939. Stern's seminar was a response to the eugenic idea of racial hygiene, so prominent in Europe and the U.S. at that time, which had made it impossible for him to continue to live in Germany.

During World War II, he led research for the American government on low-dose radiation safety, building on work he had started in Berlin. His laboratory group concluded that there is no "safe" threshold below which radiation is not harmful.

== Re-founding human genetics ==
After the war, his research focused on human genetics, pioneering in what is now known as gene regulation. Although not a physician, he engaged in clinical work in human genetics. In 1943 he began teaching a course in human genetics to medical students at the University of Rochester. The first edition of Stern's pioneering textbook The Principles of Human Genetics was published in 1949, which he said in an autobiographical sketch from 1974 he wrote to feed the needs of premedical students. Both his teaching and his textbook were instrumental in re-founding human genetics on a non-racist basis, in sharp contrast with pre-war German and American traditions in the subject. Stern was a signatory of the 1950 UNESCO statement The Race Question, a statement by leading scientists in many fields, that questioned the validity and scientific foundations of racial theories and eugenics.

Notably, Stern made the effort to translate his human genetics textbook into German, which became the first publication in his mother tongue after a 22-year hiatus of silence, and was published in 1955. Only two more articles published in German language journals followed, besides the hundreds in English. He must have continued to read German science books, as he reviewed them for Science for example.

== Commemoration ==
The Curt Stern Award, established by the American Society of Human Genetics in 2001, recognizes a scientist who has made major scientific achievements in human genetics during the past 10 years.

== List of works ==
- Stern C. "Die genetische Analyse der Chromosomen". Naturwissenschaften, 1927, 15:465-73.
- Stern C. "Der Einfluss der Temperatur auf die Ausbildung einer Fluegelmutation bei Drosophila melanogaster". Biol. Zentralbl., 1927, 47:361—69.
- Stern C. Ueber Chromosomenelimination bei der Taufliege. Naturwissenschaften, 1927, 15:740-46.
- Stern C. Ein genetischer und zytologischer Beweis fuer Vererbung im Y-chromosom von Drosophila melanogaster. Z. Indukt. Abstamm. Vererbungsl., 1927, 44:187-231.
- Stern C. Experimentelle Erzeugung von Mutationen. Naturwissenschaften, 1927, 15:528.
- Stern C. Fortschritte der Chromosomentheorie der Vererbung. Ergeb. Biol., 1928. 4:205-359.
- Stern C. Elimination von Autosomenteilen bei Drosophila melanogaster. Z. Indukt. Abstamm. Vererbungsl., 1928 Suppl. 11:1403-4.
- Stern C. Allgemeine Genetik. Zuechtungskunde., 3:1—7.
- Stern C. Ueber Vererbung. Allg. Dtsch. Hebammenz, 44.1928.
- Stern C. Die Physiologie des Generationswechsels. Naturforscher, 1928. 5:497-508.
- Stern C. Welche Moeglichkeiten bieten die Ergebnisse der experimentellen Vererbungslehre dafuer, dass durch verschiedene Symptome charakterisierte Nervenkrankheiten auf gleicher erblicher Grundlage beruhen? Nervenarzt, 1928. 2:257-62.
- Stern C. Ueber die additive Wirkung multiplier Allele. Biol. Zentralbl., 1929. 49:261-90.
- Stern C. Ueber Letalfaktoren und ihre Bedeutung fur die Haustierzucht. Zuechter, 1929, 1:264-70.
- Stern C. Ueber Reduktionstypen der Heterochromosomen von Drosophila melanogaster. Biol. Zentralbl., 1929. 49:718-35.
- Stern C. Untersuchungen uber Aberrationen des Y-Chromosoms von Drosophila melanogaster. Z. Indukt. Abstamm. Vererbungsl., 1929. 51:253—353.
- Stern C. Die Bedeutung von Drosophila melanogaster fur die genetische Forschung. Zuechter, 1929.1:237-43.
- Stern C. Kleinere Beitraege zur Genetik von Drosophila melanogaster. I. Ein Hemmungsfakator der Purpuraugenfarbe. Z. Indukt. Abstamm. Vererbungsl., 1929. 52:373-89.
- Stern C. Erzeugung von Mutationen durch Roentgenstrahlen. Nat. Mus.1929:577-83.
- Stern C. Die Mutationsrate bei Drosophila und ihre Abhaengigkeit von der Aussentemperatur. Naturwissenschaften, 1929. 17:155-56.
- Stern C. Kleinere Beitrage zur Genetik von Drosophila melanogaster. Z. II. Gleichzeitige Rueckmutation zweier benachbarter Gene. Z. Indukt. Abstamm. Vererbungsl.1930. 53:279-86.
- Stern C. Ueber Reduktionstypen der Heterochromosomen von Drosophila melanogaster. Biol. Zentralbl., 1930. 49:718-35.
- Stern C, Guyenot E. La variation et revolution. Tome I. La variation. Naturwissenschaften, 1930 8:940.
- Stern C. Konversionstheorie und Austauschtheorie. Biol. Zentralbl., 1930 50: 608–24.
- Stern C. Der Kern als Vererbungstrager. Naturwissenschaften, 1930 18:1117—25.
- Stern C. Entgegnung auf die Bemerkungen von Franz Weidenreich zu meinem Aufsatz "Erzeugung von Mutationen durch Roentgenstrahlen" (Dezember Heft 1929 dieser Zeitschrift). Nat. Mus.1930 :133-34.
- Stern C, Sekiguti K. Analyse eines Mosaikindividuums bei Drosophila melanogaster. Biol. Zentralbl., 1931 51:194-99.
- Stern C, Ogura S. Neue Untersuchungen uber Aberrationen des Y Chromosoms von Drosophila melanogaster. Z. Indukt. Abstamm. Vererbungsl., 193158:81-121.
- Zytologisch-genetische Untersuchungen als Beweise fur die Morgansche theorie des Faktorenaustausches. Biol. Zentralbl., 1931.51:547-87.
- Stern C. Karl Belar zum Gedachtnis. Naturwissenschaften, 19:921—23.
- Stern C. Faktorenaustausch und Austausch von Chromosomenstucken. Forschungen Fortschr., 1931. 7:447-48.
- Stern C. Ein Beweis der Morganschen Theorie des Faktorenaustausches. Z. Abstgsl., 1931. 62.
- Stern C. Review of The Development of Sex in Vertebrates, by F. W. R. Brambell. Naturwissenschaften, 1931 19:324.
- Stern C. Intercambio de factores e intercambio de partes de cromosomas. Invest. Prog. Madrid, 1932. 6:156—57.
- Stern C. Die Chromosomentheorie der Faktorenkoppelung. Naturwissenschaften, 1932.20:193-201.
- Stern C. Der Austausch der Erbmerkmale beruht auf Austausch von Chromosomenstuecken. Naturforscher, 1932 9:10—18.
- Stern C. Zur Deutung eines letalen Effekts in Kreuzungen zwischen Vicia faba major und Vicia faba minor. Z. Abstamm. Vererbungsl., 1932.64:169-72.
- Stern C, A. Burkart. Untersuchungen ueber eine spontane Chromosomenverlagerung bei Drosophila melanogaster. Z. Abstgsl., 1933 64: 310–25.

== Bibliography ==
- Burian, Richard M. (2000). "Stern, Curt, in American National Biography Online".
- "Dr. Curt Stern, 79; Influential teacher of human genetics". New York Times. 1981-10-31.
- Stern, Curt (1968). Genetic mosaics and other essays. Cambridge, Massachusetts: Harvard University Press.
- Stern, Curt (1973). Principles of human genetics (3 ed.). San Francisco: W.H. Freeman. ISBN 9780716705970.
- Curt Stern Papers at the American Philosophical Society Philadelphia, Pennsylvania.
