= Gail Jarvik =

American geneticist

Gail Jarvik is an American geneticist who is currently the Arno G. Motulsky Endowed Chair at University of Washington and an Elected Fellow of the American Association for the Advancement of Science.

== Education ==
Jarvik earned her Ph.D at University of Michigan in 1986 and her M.D. at University of Iowa the following year.

== Research ==
Her research involves cancer genetics and adult genetics such inherited immune disorders, stroke, cancer, heart disease and etiology. Her highest cited paper is Common variants at MS4A4/MS4A6E, CD2AP, CD33 and EPHA1 are associated with late-onset Alzheimer's disease at 1080 times, according to Google Scholar.

== Publications ==
- Crosslin DR, McDavid A, Weston N, Zheng X, Hart E, de Andrade M, Kullo IJ, McCarty CA, Doheny KF, Pugh E, Kho A, Hayes MG, Ritchie MD, Saip A, Crawford DC, Crane PK, Newton K, Carrell DS, Gallego CJ, Nalls MA, Li R, Mirel DB, Crenshaw A, Couper DJ, Tanaka T, van Rooij FJ, Chen MH, Smith AV, Zakai NA, Yango Q, Garcia M, Liu Y, Lumley T, Folsom AR, Reiner AP, Felix JF, Dehghan A, Wilson JG, Bis JC, Fox CS, Glazer NL, Cupples LA, Coresh J, Eiriksdottir G, Gudnason V, Bandinelli S, Frayling TM, Chakravarti A, van Duijn CM, Melzer D, Levy D, Boerwinkle E, Singleton AB, Hernandez DG, Longo DL, Witteman JC, Psaty BM, Ferrucci L, Harris TB, O'Donnell CJ, Ganesh SK; CHARGE Hematology Working Group, Larson EB, Carlson CS, Jarvik GP; The electronic Medical Records and Genomics (eMERGE) Network. Genetic variation associated with circulating monocyte count in the eMERGE Network. Hum Mol Genet. Jan 12, 2013 [Epub ahead of print] (PMID 23314186).
- Kim DS, Burt AA, Crosslin DR, Robertson PD, Ranchalis JE, Boyko EJ, Nickerson DA, Furlong CE, Jarvik GP. Novel common and rare genetic determinants of paraoxonase activity: FTO, SERPINA12, and ITGAL. J Lipid Res. Nov 15, 2012. PMID 23160181.
- Guo Y, Lanktree MB, Taylor KC, Hakonarson H, Lange LA, Keating BJ; IBC 50K SNP array BMI Consortium. Gene-centric meta-analyses of 108 912 individuals confirm known body mass index loci and reveal three novel signals. Hum Mol Genet. 2013 Jan 1;22(1):184-201. doi: 10.1093/hmg/dds396. Epub 2012 Sep 21. (PMID 23001569; PMC3522401).
- Kim DS, Burt AA, Ranchalis JE, Richter RJ, Marshall JK, Nakayama KS, Jarvik ER, Eintracht JF, Rosenthal EA, Furlong CE, Jarvik GP. Dietary cholesterol increases paraoxonase 1 enzyme activity. J Lipid Res. 2012 Aug 15. [Epub ahead of print] (PMID 22896672).
- Fullerton, SM, Wolf, WA, Brothers, KB, Clayton, EW, Crawford, DC, Denny, JC, Greenland, P, Koenig, BA, Leppig, KA, Lindor, NM, McCarty, CA, McGuire, AL, McPeek Hinz ER, Mirel, DB, Ramos, EM, Ritchie, MD, Smith, ME, Waudby, CJ, Burke, W, & Jarvik, GP. Return of individual research results from Genome-wide Association Studies: experience of the Electronic Medical Records & Genomics (eMERGE) network. Genet Med. Feb 23, 2012. doi: 10.1038/gim.2012.15. [Epub ahead of print] (PMID 22361898)
- Murray ML, Cerrato F, Bennett RL, Jarvik GP. Follow-up of carriers of BRCA1 and BRCA2 variants of unknown significance: Variant reclassification and surgical decisions. Genet Med. Aug 1, 2011. (PMID 21811163)
