= American Society of Human Genetics =

Professional organization

The American Society of Human Genetics (ASHG), founded in 1948, is a professional membership organization for specialists in human genetics. As of 2009, the organization had approximately 8,000 members. The society's members include researchers, academicians, clinicians, laboratory practice professionals, genetic counselors, nurses, and others who have a special interest in the field of human genetics.

As the field of human genetics has expanded, ASHG has founded additional organizations within its membership body, including the following:

- National Society of Genetic Counselors, founded in 1979, as an advocacy group for the nascent field of genetic counseling.
- American Board of Medical Genetics, founded in 1981, to certify practitioners in human genetics.
- American Board of Genetic Counseling, founded in 1991, to certify genetic counselors.
- American College of Medical Genetics, founded in 1991, as a specialty board for medical geneticists at the doctoral level. It achieved full membership in the Council of Medical Specialty Societies in 1993.

== Mission ==
ASHG's mission is to advance human genetics in science, health, and society through excellence in research, education, and advocacy. It serves research scientists, health professionals, and the general public by providing forums to:

- Share research results at the Society's Annual Meeting and in The American Journal of Human Genetics (AJHG);
- Advance genetic research by advocating for research support;
- Enhance genetics education by preparing future professionals and informing the public; and
- Promote genetic services and support responsible social and scientific policies.

== ASHG annual meeting ==
The ASHG Annual Meeting is the oldest and largest international human genetics conference worldwide. It is held each fall in a major U.S. or Canadian city and attracts about 6,000–7,000 attendees, plus exhibitors. The meeting features invited presentations from the world's leading geneticists, along with a variety of symposia, workshops, and other abstract-driven sessions focusing on the most important and recent developments in basic, translational, and clinical human genetics research and technology. It also offers exhibitors the opportunity to interact with attendees and promote their services, products, and new technology, including state-of-the-art medical and laboratory equipment, and computer software designed to enhance genetics research and data analysis.

== Awards ==
The society's highest honor, awarded annually since 1961, is the William Allan Award, established in memory of the physician William Allan to recognize substantial and far-reaching scientific contributions to human genetics, performed over a sustained period of scientific inquiry and productivity. The Curt Stern Award, established in 2001, recognizes scientific achievements over the previous ten years.

Other ASHG annual awards include: the Arno Motulsky-Barton Childs Award for Excellence in Human Genetics Education (established in 1995), Charles Epstein Trainee Research Awards (established in 1995), Advocacy Award (established in 2015), Mentorship Award (established in 2016), and Early-Career Award (established in 2017).

== Education and professional development ==
ASHG aims to promote awareness of human genetics, encourage young people to enter genetics-related careers, foster trust and support for genetics research, and help prepare health professionals to integrate genomics into medicine. Since 2007, the Society has organized the annual DNA Day Essay Contest for high school students. It also provides career development tools and opportunities for early-career geneticists, including fellowships in Genetics & Public Policy and Genetics & Education in partnership with the National Human Genome Research Institute.

== Science policy ==
ASHG backs policies that support scientific discovery, the translation of discoveries into health advances, the appropriate application of genetics in society, and the integration of genetics teaching into children’s education and training of health professionals. In collaboration with the Federation of American Societies for Experimental Biology, ASHG supports increased federal funding for scientific research, particularly from the National Institutes of Health.

On January 2, 2008, the American Society of Human Genetics released a statement on direct-to-consumer sales of genetic tests, calling for improved standards and for oversight by the Federal Trade Commission to insure the accuracy and validity of genetic testing and sales claims.

== See also ==
- Franz Josef Kallmann, one of the founders
- List of presidents of the American Society of Human Genetics
