= List of geneticists =

This is a list of people who have made notable contributions to genetics. The growth and development of genetics represents the work of many people. This list of geneticists is therefore by no means complete. Contributors of great distinction to genetics are not yet on the list.

== A ==
=== Aa–Al ===
- Dagfinn Aarskog (1928–2014), Norwegian pediatrician and geneticist, described Aarskog–Scott syndrome
- John Abelson (born 1938), US biochemist, studies of machinery and mechanism of RNA splicing
- Susan L. Ackerman (21st century), US neurogeneticist, genes controlling brain development and neuron survival
- Jerry Adams (born 1940), US molecular biologist in Australia, hematopoietic genetics and cancer
- Bruce Alberts (born 1938), US biochemist, phage worker, studied DNA replication and cell division
- Lihadh Al-Gazali (born 1948), Iraqi geneticist, research on congenital disorders in the United Arab Emirates
- William Allan (1881–1943), US country doctor, pioneered human genetics
- C. David Allis (1951–2003), US biologist at the Rockefeller University who worked on chromatin
- Robin Allshire (born 1960), UK-based Irish molecular biologist/geneticist and expert in formation of heterochromatin and centromeres
- Cecil A. Alport (1880–1959), South African internist who identified Alport syndrome (hereditary nephritis and deafness)
- Carl-Henry Alström (1907–1993), Swedish psychiatrist, described genetic disease: Alström syndrome
- Frederick Alt (graduated 1971), American geneticist known for research on maintenance of genome stability in the cells of the mammalian immunological system
- Lee Altenberg, US theoretical population geneticist noted for work on the evolution of evolvability
- Russ Altman (Ph.D. 1981), US geneticist and bioengineer known for his work in pharmacogenomics
- Sidney Altman (1939–2022), Canadian-US biophysicist who won Nobel Prize for catalytic functions of RNA
- David Altshuler (born 1964), US endocrinologist and geneticist, the genetics of type 2 diabetes

=== Am–Ax ===
- Bruce Ames (1928–2024), US molecular geneticist, created Ames test to screen chemicals for mutagenicity
- D. Bernard Amos (1923–2003), UK-US immunologist who studied the genetics of individuality
- Edgar Anderson (1897–1969), US botanical geneticist who introduced the term introgressive hybridization
- E. G. ("Andy") Anderson (1924–1993), US Drosophila and maize geneticist
- William French Anderson (born 1936), US worker in gene therapy
- Corino Andrade (1906–2005), Portuguese neurologist and clinical geneticist
- Tim Anson (1901–1968), US molecular biologist, proposed protein folding a reversible two-state reaction
- Stylianos E. Antonarakis (born 1951), US-Greek medical geneticist, genotypic and phenotypic variation
- Werner Arber (born 1929), Swiss microbiologist, Nobel Prize for discovery of restriction endonucleases
- Michael Ashburner (1942–2023), British Drosophila geneticist and polymath
- William Astbury (1898–1961), UK molecular biologist, X-ray crystallography of proteins and DNA
- Giuseppe Attardi (1923–2008), Italian-US molecular biologist, genetics of human mitochondrial function
- Charlotte Auerbach (1899–1994), German-born British pioneer in mutagenesis
- Oswald Avery (1877–1955), Canadian-born US co-discoverer that DNA is the genetic material
- Richard Axel (born 1946), US physician-scientist, Nobel Prize for genetic analysis of olfactory system

== B ==
=== Ba–Be ===
- Ernest Brown Babcock (1877–1954), US plant geneticist, pioneered genetic analysis of genus Crepis
- Édouard-Gérard Balbiani (1823–1899), French embryologist who found chromosome puffs now called Balbiani rings
- David Baltimore (1938–2025), US biologist, Nobel Prize for the discovery of reverse transcriptase
- Guido Barbujani (born 1955), Italian population geneticist and evolutionary biologist
- Cornelia Bargmann (born 1961), US molecular neurogeneticist studying the C. elegans brain
- David P. Bartel (B.A. 1982), US geneticist, discovered many microRNAs regulating gene expression
- William Bateson (1861–1926), British geneticist who coined the term "genetics"
- Erwin Baur (1875–1933), German geneticist, botanist, discovered inheritance of plasmids
- George Beadle (1903–1989), US Neurospora geneticist and Nobel Prize-winner
- Peter Emil Becker (1908–2000), German human geneticist, described Becker's muscular dystrophy
- Jon Beckwith (born 1935), US microbiologist and geneticist, isolated first gene from a bacterial chromosome
- David J. Begun (born 1965), American population geneticist
- Peter Beighton (1934–2023), UK/South Africa medical geneticist
- Julia Bell (1879–1979), English geneticist who documented inheritance of many diseases
- John Belling (1866–1933), English cytogeneticist who developed staining technique for chromosomes
- Baruj Benacerraf (1920–2011), Venezuelan-US immunologist who won Nobel Prize for human leukocyte antigen system
- Kurt Benirschke (1924–2018), German-US pathologist, comparative cytogenetics, twinning in armadillos
- Seymour Benzer (1921–2007), US molecular biologist and pioneer of neurogenetics
- Dorothea Bennett (1929–1990), US geneticist, Pioneer of developmental genetics
- Paul Berg (1926–2023), US biochemist and Nobel Prize-winner for basic research on nucleic acids
- John Desmond Bernal (1901–1971), Irish physicist and pioneer X-ray crystallographer

=== Bi–Bo ===
- James Birchler (PhD 1977), US Drosophila and maize geneticist and cytogeneticist.
- J. Michael Bishop (1936–2026), US microbial immunogeneticist, Nobel Prize-winner for oncogenes
- Elizabeth Blackburn (born 1948), Australian-US biologist, Lasker Award and Nobel Prize for telomeres and telomerase
- Frjeda Blanchard (1889–1977), American plant and animal geneticist
- Günter Blobel (1936–2018), German-US biologist, Nobel Prize for protein targeting (address tags on proteins)
- David Blow (1931–2004), British biophysicist who helped develop X-ray crystallography of proteins
- Baruch Blumberg (Barry Blumberg) (1925–2011), US physician and Nobel Prize-winner on hepatitis B
- Julia Bodmer (1934–2001), British geneticist, key figure in discovery and definition of the HLA system
- Walter Bodmer (born 1936), German-UK human population geneticist, immunogeneticist, cancer research
- James Bonner (1910–1996), US molecular biologist who studied histones, chromatin, nucleic acids
- David Botstein (1942–2026), Swiss-born US molecular geneticist, brother of Leon Botstein
- Theodor Boveri (1862–1915), German biologist and cytogeneticist
- Herb Boyer (born 1936), US biotechnologist who created transgenic bacteria inserting human insulin gene into E. coli

=== Br–Bu ===
- Jean Brachet (1909–1998), Belgian biochemist, made key contributions to fathoming roles of RNA
- Roscoe Brady (1923–2016), US physician-scientist at NIH, studies of genetic neurological metabolic disorders
- Sydney Brenner (1927–2019), British molecular biologist and Nobel Prize-winner
- Calvin Bridges (1889–1938), US geneticist, non-disjunction proof that chromosomes contain genes
- R. A. Brink (1897–1984), Canadian-US plant geneticist and breeder, studied paramutation, transposons
- Roy Britten (1919–2012) US molecular and evolutionary biologist, discovered and studied junk DNA
- John Brookfield (born 1955), British Drosophila population geneticist
- Michael Stuart Brown (born 1941), US geneticist and Nobel Prize-winner on cholesterol metabolism
- Stephen Brown (born 1955), British geneticist at the MRC Harwell
- Manuel Buchwald (born 1940), Peruvian-born Canadian medical geneticist and molecular geneticist
- Linda Buck (born 1947), US biologist, Nobel Prize for post-doc work (with Axel) cloning olfactory receptors
- James Bull (20th–21st century), US molecular biologist and phage worker, evolution of sex determining mechanisms
- Luther Burbank (1849–1926), US botanist, horticulturist, pioneer in agricultural science
- Macfarlane Burnet (1899–1985), Australian biologist, Nobel Prize for immunological tolerance
- Cyril Burt (1883–1971), British educational psychologist, did debated mental and behavioral twin study

== C ==
=== Ca ===
- John Cairns FRS (1922–2018), UK physician-scientist, showed bacterial DNA one molecule with replicating fork
- Allan Campbell (1929–2018), US microbiologist and geneticist, pioneering work on phage lambda
- Mario Capecchi (born 1937), Italian-born US molecular geneticist, co-invented the knockout mouse, Nobel Prize in Medicine, 2007
- Elof Axel Carlson (1931–2025), US geneticist and eminent historian of science
- Rivka Carmi (born 1948), Israeli pediatrician, geneticist, President of Ben-Gurion University of the Negev
- Adelaide Carpenter (1944–2024), US geneticist known for her research on recombination nodule
- Hampton L. Carson (1914–2004), US population geneticist, studied cytogenetics and evolution of Drosophila
- Tom Caskey (1938–2022), US internist, human geneticist and entrepreneur; biochemical diseases
- Torbjörn Caspersson (1910–1997), Swedish cytogeneticist, revealed human chromosome banding
- William B. Castle (1897–1990), US hematologist, work on hereditary spherocytosis, sickle cell anemia
- William E. Castle (1867–1962), US geneticist, inspired T.H. Morgan, father of William B. Castle
- David Catcheside (1907–1994), UK plant geneticist, expert on genetic recombination, active in Australia
- Bruce Cattanach (1932–2020), UK mouse geneticist, X-inactivation and sex determination in mice
- Luigi Luca Cavalli-Sforza (1922–2018), Italian population geneticist at Stanford University

=== Ce–Ch ===
- Thomas Cech (born 1947), US biochemist who won Nobel Prize for catalytic functions of RNA
- Aravinda Chakravarti (born 1954), Indian bioinformatician in the US studying genetic factors in common diseases
- Daniel Chamovitz (born 1963), American and Israeli plant geneticist who discovered the COP9 Signalosome (CSN) complex
- Jean-Pierre Changeux (born 1936), French molecular neurobiologist, studied allosteric proteins
- Erwin Chargaff (1905–2002), Austrian-born US biochemist, Chargaff's rules led to the double helix
- Brian Charlesworth (born 1945), British evolutionary biologist, husband of Deborah Charlesworth
- Deborah Charlesworth (born 1943), British evolutionary biologist, wife of Brian Charlesworth
- Martha Chase (1927–2003), US biologist, with Hersey proved genetic material is DNA, not protein
- Sergei Chetverikov (1880–1959), Russian population geneticist
- Barton Childs (1916–2010), US pediatrician, biochemical geneticist, philosopher of medical genetics
- George M. Church (born 1954), US molecular geneticist, did first direct genomic sequencing with Gilbert

=== Ci–Cu ===
- Aaron Ciechanover (born 1947), Israeli biologist, won Nobel Prize for ubiquitin-mediated protein degradation
- Bryan Clarke (1932–2014), British population geneticist, studied apostatic selection and molecular evolution
- Cyril Clarke (1907–2000), British medical geneticist, discovered how to prevent Rh disease in newborns
- Jens Clausen (1891–1969), Danish-US botanist, geneticist, and ecologist
- Stanley Cohen (1922–2020), US neurobiologist, Nobel Prize for cell growth factors
- Francis Collins (born 1950), US medical geneticist, gene cloner, director of Human Genome Institute
- James J. Collins (born 1965), US bioengineer, pioneered synthetic biology and systems biology
- Robert Corey (1897–1971), US biochemist, α-helix, β-sheet and atomic models for proteins
- Carl Correns (1864–1933), German botanist and geneticist, one of the re-discoverers of Mendel in 1900
- Harriet Creighton (1909–2004), US botanist who with McClintock first saw chromosomal crossover
- Francis Crick (1916–2004), English molecular biologist, neuroscientist, co-discoverer of the double helix
- James F. Crow (1916–2012), US population geneticist and renowned teacher of genetics
- Lucien Cuénot (1866–1951), French biologist, proved Mendel's rules apply to animals as well as plants
- A. Jamie Cuticchia (1966–2022), US geneticist who studied human genome informatics

== D ==
=== Da–De ===
- Mark Daly (born 1967), American geneticist who identified genes associated with Crohn's disease, inflammatory bowel disease, autism and schizophrenia
- David M. Danks (1931–2003), Australian pediatrician and medical geneticist, expert on Menkes disease
- C. D. Darlington (1903–1981), British biologist and geneticist, elucidated chromosomal crossover
- Charles Darwin (1809–1882), English naturalist and author of On the Origin of Species
- Kay Davies (born 1951), English geneticist, expert on muscular dystrophy
- Ronald W. Davis (b. 1941) American biochemist and geneticist at Stanford University
- Jean Dausset (1916–2009), French immunogeneticist and Nobel Prize-winner for the HLA system
- Martin Dawson (1896–1945), Canadian-US researcher, confirmed and named genetic transformation
- Margaret Dayhoff (1925–1983), US pioneer in bioinformatics of protein sequences and evolution
- Christian de Duve (1917–2013), Belgian cytologist, Nobel Prize for cell organelles (peroxisomes, lysosomes)
- Albert de la Chapelle (1933–2020), Finnish medical geneticist, genetic predisposition to cancer
- Max Delbrück (1906–1981), German-US scientist, Nobel Prize for genetic structure of viruses
- Charles DeLisi (born 1941), US biophysicist, led the initiative that planned and launched the Human Genome Project
- Milislav Demerec (1895–1966), Croatian-US geneticist, directed Cold Spring Harbor Laboratory
- Carrie Derick (1862–1941), Canadian geneticist, Canada's first woman professor
- Emmanouil Dermitzakis (born 1972), Greek human geneticist known for research on the importance of non-coding DNA in evolution and disease risk
- Hugo de Vries (1848–1935), Dutch botanist and one of the re-discoverers of Mendel's laws in 1900
- Félix d'Herelle (1873–1949), Canadian-French microbiologist, discovered phages, invented phage therapy

=== Do–Du ===
- Theodosius Dobzhansky (1900–1975), Ukrainian-US geneticist and evolutionary biologist
- John Doebley, (born 1952), US geneticist, studies genes that drive development and evolution of plants
- Peter Doherty (born 1940), Australian immunologist won Nobel Prize for immune recognition of antigens
- Helen Donis-Keller (20th century), Professor of Biology and Art at Olin College of Engineering
- Albert Dorfman (1916–1982), US biochemical geneticist, discovered cause of Hurler's syndrome
- Gabriel Dover (1937–2018), British evolutionary geneticist known for the concept of molecular drive
- Dennis Drayna, (born 1952), American human geneticist most notable for discovering genetic causes of stuttering
- Nikolay Dubinin (1907–1998), Russian biologist and geneticist
- Peter Duesberg (1936–2026), German-American molecular biologist who discovered oncogenes
- Florence Durham (1869–1949), British geneticist at Cambridge, advocate of the theory of Mendelian inheritance
- Leslie Clarence Dunn (1893–1974), American developmental geneticist at Columbia University

== E ==
- Edward Murray East (1879–1938). American plant geneticist, botanist, agronomist and eugenicist.
- Richard H. Ebright (born 1959), US bacterial geneticist, molecular mechanisms of transcription and transcriptional regulation
- Robert Stuart Edgar (1930-2016), US geneticist, elucidated the function of bacterial virus genes
- Anthony W. F. Edwards (born 1935), British statistician, geneticist, developed methods of phylogenetic analysis
- John Edwards (1928–2007), British medical geneticist and cytogeneticist who first described trisomy 18
- Hans Eiberg (born 1945), Danish geneticist, discovered the mutation causing blue eyes
- Eran Elhaik (born 1980), Israeli-American geneticist and bioinformatician
- Jeff Ellis (born 1953), Australian plant biologist concerned with plant disease resistance genes
- Robert C. Elston (born 1932), British-born American biostatistical genetics and genetic epidemiologist
- Rollins A. Emerson (1873–1947), US plant geneticist, the main pioneer of corn genetics
- Sterling Emerson (1900–1988), US, biochemical genetics, recombination, son of R. A. Emerson
- Alan Emery (born 1928), British neuromuscular geneticist, Emery–Dreifuss muscular dystrophy
- Anne Ephrussi (born 1955), French developmental and molecular biologist
- Boris Ephrussi (1901–1979), Russian-born French geneticist, created way to transplant chromosomes
- Harriett Ephrussi-Taylor (1918–1968), American geneticist who worked on transformation and bacterial recombination
- Charlie Epstein (1933–2011), US medical geneticist, editor, developed mouse model for Down syndrome, wounded by the Unabomber
- Eleazar Eskin (21st century), US computational biologist studying the genetic basis of human disease. Chair of the Department of Computational Medicine, University of California, Los Angeles
- Herbert McLean Evans (1882–1971), US anatomist, reported in 1918 humans had 48 chromosomes
- Martin Evans (born 1941), British scientist, discovered embryonic stem cells and developed knockout mouse
- Cassandra Extavour (Ph.D. 2001), Canadian American geneticist and Professor of Organismic and Evolutionary Biology at Harvard University
- Warren Ewens (born 1937), Australian-US mathematical population geneticist, Ewens's sampling formula

== F ==
- Arturo Falaschi (1933–2010), Italian geneticist, researched the origin of DNA replication
- D. S. Falconer (1913–2004), Scottish quantitative geneticist, wrote textbook to the subject
- Darrel R. Falk (born 1946), Canadian biologist who worked on molecular genetics Drosophila melanogaster and repair of chromosome breaks
- Stanley Falkow (1934–2018), US microbial geneticist, molecular mechanisms of bacterial pathogenesis
- Harold Falls (1909–2006), US ophthalmologic geneticist, helped found first genetics clinic in US
- William C. Farabee (1865–1925), US anthropologist, brachydactyly is evidence of Mendelism in humans
- Nina Fedoroff (born 1942), US plant geneticist, cloning of transposable elements, plant stress response
- Marcus W. Feldman, US theoretical population geneticist and pioneer in models of cultural evolution
- Joseph Felsenstein, US theoretical population geneticist and pioneer in computational phylogenetics
- Anne Ferguson-Smith (born 1961) British mammalian developmental geneticist
- Malcolm Ferguson-Smith (1931–2026) UK cytogeneticist, Klinefelter syndrome, chromosome flow cytometry
- John Fincham (1926–2005), UK microbial (Neurospora) and biochemical geneticist
- Gerald Fink (born 1941), US molecular geneticist, preeminent figure in the field of yeast genetics
- Andrew Fire (born 1959), US geneticist, Nobel Prize with Craig Mello for discovery of RNA interference
- Ed Fischer (1920–2021), Swiss-US biochemist, Nobel Prize for phosphorylation as switch activating proteins
- Eugen Fischer (1874–1967), German physician, anthropologist, eugenicist, influenced Nazi racial hygiene
- R. A. Fisher (1890–1962), British statistician, evolutionary biologist, and geneticist
- Elizabeth Fisher (20th–21st century), British neuroscientist and geneticist
- Ivar Asbjørn Følling (1888–1973), Norwegian biochemist and physician who discovered phenylketonuria (PKU)
- Charles Ford (1912–1999), British pioneer in the golden age of mammalian cytogenetics
- E. B. Ford (1901–1988), British ecological geneticist, specializing in butterflies and moths
- Ruth Fowler Edwards (1930–2013), British geneticist who helped develop controlled ovulation induction in the mouse
- Heinz Fraenkel-Conrat (1910–1999), German-born US biochemist who studied tobacco mosaic virus
- Rosalind Franklin (1920–1958), British crystallographer whose data led to discovery of double helix
- Clarke Fraser (1920–2014), Canada's first medical geneticist, student of congenital malformations
- Elaine Fuchs (born c. 1951), US cell biologist, molecular mechanisms of skin diseases, reverse genetics

== G ==
=== Ga–Gi ===
- Michael T. Gabbett (born 1974), Australian medical geneticist and academic, known for describing Temple–Baraitser syndrome and sesquizygotic twinning
- Fred Gage (born 1950), US neuroscientist, studies of neurogenesis and neuroplasticity of the adult brain
- Joseph G. Gall (1928–2024), US cell biologist, chromosomes, created in situ hybridization
- Francis Galton (1822–1911), British geneticist, eugenicist, statistician
- George Gamow (1904–1968), Ukrainian-born American polymath, proposed genetic code concept
- Alan Garen (1926–2022), US, early molecular geneticist, nonsense triplets terminating transcription
- Archibald Garrod (1857–1936), English physician, pioneered inborn errors, founded biochemical genetics
- Stan Gartler (1923–2026), US human geneticist, G6PD as X-linked marker, clonality of cancer, HeLa cells contaminating cell lines
- Walter Gehring (1939–2014), Swiss, developmental genetics of Drosophila, discovered homeobox
- Hilda Geiringer (1893–1973), Austrian mathematician who pioneered the mathematics of recombination
- Walter Gilbert (born 1932), US biochemist and molecular biologist, Nobel Prize-winner, entrepreneur
- John H. Gillespie, US theoretical population geneticist, known for stochastic molecular biology models of natural selection

=== Gl–Gu ===
- H. Bentley Glass (1906–2005), US geneticist, provocative science theorizer, writer, science policy maker
- Salome Gluecksohn-Waelsch (1907–2007), German-born US co-founder of developmental genetics
- Richard Goldschmidt (1878–1958), German-American, integrated genetics, development, and evolution
- Joseph L. Goldstein (born 1940), US medical geneticist, Nobel Prize-winner on cholesterol
- Robert J. Gorlin (1923–2006), US oral pathologist, clinical geneticist, craniofacial syndrome expert
- Irving I. Gottesman (1930–2016), US behavioral geneticist, used twin studies to analyze schizophrenia
- Carol W. Greider (born 1961), US molecular biologist, Lasker Award and Nobel Prize for telomeres and telomerase
- Jack Greenblatt (20-21st centuries), Molecular geneticist at the University of Toronto
- Frederick Griffith (1879–1941), British medical officer who found transforming principle now called DNA
- Lyn R. Griffiths (graduated 1978), Australian molecular geneticist known for her work in neurogenetics
- Hans Grüneberg (1907–1982), British mouse geneticist and blood cell biologist
- Christine Guthrie (1945-2022), US yeast geneticist who studied small nuclear RNAs in yeast

== H ==
=== Ha ===
- Ernst Hadorn (1902–1976), Swiss pioneer in developmental genetics, mentor of Walter Gehring
- JBS Haldane (1892–1964), British human geneticist and co-founder of population genetics
- Ben Hall (1932–2019), US geneticist, DNA:RNA hybridization, yeast production of genetically engineered proteins
- Judy Hall (born 1939), dual American and Canadian clinical geneticist and dysmorphologist
- Dean Hamer (born 1951) US geneticist, postulated gay gene and God gene for religious experience
- W. D. Hamilton (1936–2000), British evolutionary biologist and eminent evolutionary theorist
- Phil Hanawalt (born 1931), US geneticist, discovered DNA repair replication
- Anita Harding (1952–1995), UK neurologist, first mitochondrial DNA mutation in disease
- G. H. Hardy (1877–1947), British mathematician, formulated basic law of population genetics
- Henry Harpending (1944–2016), US anthropologist and human population geneticist
- Harry Harris (1919–1994), British biochemical geneticist concerned with genetic variation between individuals
- Henry Harris (1925–2014), Australian-born cell biologist, work on cancer and human genetics
- Lee Hartwell (born 1939), US yeast geneticist, Nobel Prize, "start" gene and checkpoints in the cell cycle
- Nicholas Hastie (born 1947), British geneticist, former Director of the MRC Human Genetics Unit at the University of Edinburgh
- William Hayes (1918–1994), Australian physician, microbiologist and geneticist, bacterial conjugation
- Robert Haynes (1931–1998), Canadian geneticist and biophysicist, work on DNA repair and mutagenesis

=== He–Hi ===
- Martin Heisenberg (born 1940), German geneticist, neurobiologist, genetic study of brain of Drosophila
- Charles Roy Henderson, (1911–1989), US animal geneticist, basis for genetic evaluation of livestock, developed statistical methods used in animal breeding
- Al Hershey (1908–1997), US bacterial geneticist, Nobel Prize largely for Hershey–Chase experiment
- Ira Herskowitz (1946–2003), US phage and yeast geneticist, genetic regulatory circuits and mechanisms
- Avram Hershko (born 1937), Israeli biologist, Nobel Prize for ubiquitin-mediated protein degradation
- Len Herzenberg (1931–2013), US human geneticist, immunologist, cell biologist and cell sorter
- Leonore Herzenberg (born 1935), American immunologist and geneticist
- Joel Naom Hirschhorn (20th–21st century), American human geneticist, pediatrician, and endocrinologist.
- Kurt Hirschhorn (1926–2022), Viennese-born American pediatrician, medical geneticist, cytogeneticist; described Wolf–Hirschhorn syndrome

=== Ho–Hu ===
- Mahlon Hoagland (1921–2009), US physician and biochemist, co-discovered tRNA with Paul Zamecnik
- Dorothy Hodgkin (1910–1994), British pioneer of protein crystallography and Nobel Prize winner
- Robert W. Holley (1922–1993), US biochemist, structure of transfer RNA, Nobel Prize
- Leroy Hood (born 1938), US molecular biotechnologist, created DNA and protein sequencers and synthesizers
- Norman Horowitz (1915–2005), US geneticist, one gene-one enzyme, chemical evolution, space biology
- H. Robert Horvitz (born 1947), US cell biologist, Nobel Prize for programmed cell death
- David E. Housman (born 1946), US molecular biologist, genetic basis of trinucleotide repeat diseases and cancer
- T. C. Hsu (1917–2003), Chinese-American cell biologist, geneticist, cytogeneticist
- Thomas J. Hudson (born 1961), Canadian genome scientist, maps of human and mouse genomes
- David Hungerford (1927–1993), US co-discoverer of Philadelphia chromosome in CML
- Tim Hunt (born 1943), UK biochemist, Nobel Prize for discovery of cyclins in cell cycle control
- Laurence Hurst (born 1965) British evolutionary geneticist at the University of Bath
- Charles Leonard Huskins (1897–1953), English-born Canadian cytogeneticist at McGill University and University of Wisconsin–Madison

== I ==
- Harvey Itano (1920–2010), American biochemist and pioneer in the study of sickle cell disease

== J ==
- François Jacob (1920–2013), French biologist, won Nobel Prize for bacterial gene control
- Patricia A. Jacobs (1934–2026), Scottish human geneticist and cytogeneticist
- Albert Jacquard (1925–2013), French geneticist, essayist, humanist, activist
- Rudolf Jaenisch (born 1942), German cell biologist, created transgenic mice, leader in therapeutic cloning
- Richard Jefferson (born 1956), US molecular plant biologist in Australia, reporter gene system GUS
- Alec Jeffreys (born 1950), British geneticist, developed DNA fingerprinting and DNA profiling techniques
- Niels Kaj Jerne (1911–1994), Danish theoretician in modern immunology, Nobel Prize
- Wilhelm Johannsen (1857–1927), Danish botanist who in 1909 coined the word "gene"
- Elizabeth W. Jones (1939–2008) US yeast geneticist, first to complete the University of Washington graduate genetics program
- Jonathan D. G. Jones (born 1954), British plant molecular biologist
- Steve Jones (born 1944), British evolutionary geneticist and malacologist
- Christian Jung (born 1956), German plant geneticist and molecular biologist

== K ==
=== Ka–Ki ===
- Elvin Kabat (1914–2000) US immunochemist, a founder of modern immunology, antibody-combining sites
- Henrik Kacser (1918–1995), Austro-Hungarian-born UK biochemist and geneticist, worked on metabolic control
- Axel Kahn (1944–2021), French geneticist, known for work on genetically modified plants
- Patricia Kailis (1933–2020), Australian geneticist known for work in genetic counselling
- Franz Josef Kallmann (1897–1965), German-US psychiatrist, pioneer in genetics of psychiatric diseases
- Wojciech Karlowski (born 1966), Polish molecular biologist specializing in molecular genetics and genomics
- Gopinath Kartha (1927–1984), Indian biophysicist, co-discovered triple-helix structure of collagen
- Berwind P. Kaufmann (1897–1975), US botanist, did research in basic plant and animal cytogenetics
- Oscar Kempthorne (1919–2000), British statistician and geneticist
- John Kendrew (1917–1997), UK crystallographer, won Nobel Prize for structure of myoglobin
- Cynthia Kenyon (born 1954), US molecular biologist, genetics of aging in the worm C. elegans
- Warwick Estevam Kerr (1922–2018), Brazilian expert in the genetics and sex determination of bees
- Bernard Kettlewell (1907–1979), UK physician, lepidopterist, ecological geneticist, peppered moth
- Seymour Kety (1915–2000), US neuroscientist, essential involvement of genetic factors in schizophrenia
- Gobind Khorana (1922–2011), Indian-US molecular biologist, synthesized nucleic acids, Nobel Prize
- Motoo Kimura (1924–1994), Japanese mathematical biologist in theoretical population genetics known for the neutral theory of molecular evolution
- Mary-Claire King (born 1946), US human geneticist and social activist, identified breast cancer genes

=== Kl–Ku ===
- David Klein (1908–1993), Swiss ophthalmologist and human geneticist
- Aaron Klug (1926–2018), Lithuania/South Africa/UK, Nobel Prize for developing electron crystallography
- Al Knudson (1922–2016), US pediatric oncologist, geneticist, formulated two hit hypothesis of cancer
- Georges J. F. Köhler (1946–1995), German, Nobel Prize for hybridomas making monoclonal antibodies
- Arthur Kornberg (1918–2007), US biochemist, Nobel Prize on DNA synthesis, father of Roger Kornberg
- Hans Kornberg (1928–2019), German-UK biologist, studies of carbohydrate transport
- Roger Kornberg (born 1947), US biologist, Nobel Prize on eukaryotic transcription
- Ed Krebs (1918–2009), US biochemist, Nobel Prize for phosphorylation as switch activating proteins
- Martin Kreitman (20th–21st century), US geneticist known for the McDonald–Kreitman test that is used to infer adaptive evolution in population genetic studies
- Dronamraju Krishna Rao (1937–2020), Indian born geneticist in the US, founder of Foundation of Genetic Research, whose research covered a wide range of topics, including flower colour and human abnormalities
- Shrawan Kumar (20th–21st century), Indian and US geneticist known for gene mapping and cloning

== L ==
=== La–Le ===
- Bruce Lahn (born 1969), Chinese-born US geneticist specializing in evolutionary changes of the human brain
- Jean-Baptiste Lamarck (1744–1829), French naturalist, evolutionist, "inheritance of acquired traits"
- Eric Lander (born 1957), US molecular geneticist, major contributor to Human Genome Project
- Karl Landsteiner (1868–1943), Austrian-American pathologist, won Nobel Prize for blood group discoveries
- fr:André Langaney (born 1942), French evolutionary geneticist and popularizer of science
- Derald Langham (1913–1991), US agricultural geneticist, the "father of sesame"
- Charles H. Langley (born 1940), American population geneticist
- Sam Latt (1938–1988), US pioneer in molecular cytogenetics, fluorescent DNA chromosome probes
- Philip Leder (1934–2020), US geneticist, method to decode genetic code, transgenic animals to study cancer
- Esther Lederberg (1922–2006), US microbiologist and bacterial genetics pioneer
- Joshua Lederberg (1925–2008), US molecular biologist, Nobel Prize, headed Rockefeller University
- Jérôme Lejeune (1926–1994), French pediatrician, geneticist, credited with discovering trisomy 21 in Down syndrome
- Richard Lenski (born 1956), US biologist and phage worker, did long-term E. coli evolution experiment
- Fritz Lenz (1887–1976), German geneticist and eugenicist, ideas influenced Nazi racial hygiene policies
- Widukind Lenz (1919–1995), German medical geneticist who recognized thalidomide syndrome
- Leonard Lerman (1925–2012), US molecular biologist, phage worker, mentor of Nobel Prize-winner Sidney Altman
- I. Michael Lerner (1910–1977), Russian-US contributor to population, quantitative and evolutionary genetics
- Albert Levan (1905–1998), Swedish geneticist, co-authored report that humans have 46 chromosomes
- Cyrus Levinthal (1922–1990), US molecular geneticist, DNA replication, mRNA, molecular graphics
- Edward B. Lewis (1918–2004), US founder of developmental genetics and Nobel Prize-winner
- Richard Lewontin (1929–2021), US evolutionary biologist, geneticist and social commentator

=== Li–Ly ===
- C. C. Li (1912–2003), Chinese American population geneticist and human geneticist
- Wen-Hsiung Li (born 1942), Taiwanese-American, molecular evolution, population genetics, genomics
- David Linder (1923–1999), US pathologist and geneticist, used G6PD as X-linked clonal tumor marker
- Susan Lindquist (1949–2016), US molecular biologist studying effects of protein folding and heat-shock proteins
- Jan Lindsten (born 1935), Swedish medical geneticist, secretary general of the Nobel Assembly
- C. C. Little (1888–1971), US pioneer mouse geneticist, founded Jackson Laboratory in Bar Harbor, Maine
- Herbert Lubs (born c. 1928), US internist, medical geneticist, described "marker X" (fragile X chromosome)
- Salvador Luria (1912–1991), Italian-American molecular biologist, Nobel Prize for bacteriophage genetics
- Jay Lush (1896–1982), US animal geneticist who pioneered modern scientific animal breeding
- Michael Lynch (born 1951), US quantitative geneticist studying evolution, population genetics, and genomics
- Mary F. Lyon (1925–2014), English mouse geneticist, noted X-inactivation and proposed Lyon hypothesis
- David T. Lykken (1928–2006), US psychologist and behavioral geneticist known for twin studies
- Trofim Lysenko (1898–1976), Soviet scientist, led vicious political campaign against genetics in USSR

== M ==
=== Ma–Mc ===
- Ellen Magenis (1925–2014), US medical geneticist and cytogeneticist, Smith–Magenis syndrome
- Colin MacLeod (1909–1972), Canadian-American co-discoverer that DNA is the genetic material
- Tak Wah Mak (born 1946), Chinese-Canadian molecular biologist, co-discovered human T cell receptor genes
- Gustave Malécot (1911–1998), French mathematician who influenced population genetics
- Tom Maniatis (born 1943), US molecular biologist, gene cloning, regulation of gene expression
- Clement Markert (1917–1999), US biologist who discovered isoenzymes
- Marco Marra (born 1966), Canadian geneticist known for demonstrating the role of genomics in human health and disease research.
- John Maynard Smith (1920–2004), British evolutionary biologist and population geneticist
- Ernst Mayr (1904–2005), German-born American evolutionary biologist
- Phyllis McAlpine (1941–1998), Canadian human geneticist and gene mapper
- Maclyn McCarty (1911–2005), US co-discoverer that DNA is the genetic material
- Barbara McClintock (1902–1992), US cytogeneticist, Nobel Prize for genetic transposition
- William McGinnis (20th–21st century), US molecular geneticist, found homeobox (Hox) genes responsible for basic body plan
- Victor A. McKusick (1921–2008), US internist and clinical geneticist, organized human genetic knowledge

=== Me–Mi ===
- Craig C. Mello (born 1960), US geneticist, Nobel Prize for discovery of RNA interference
- Gregor Mendel (1822–1884), Bohemian monk who discovered laws of Mendelian inheritance
- Carole Meredith (20th century), US geneticist who pioneered DNA typing to differentiate between grape varieties
- Matthew Meselson (born 1930), US molecular geneticist, work on DNA replication, recombination, repair
- Peter Michaelis (1900–1975), German plant geneticist, focused on cytoplasmic inheritance
- Ivan Vladimirovich Michurin (1855–1935), Russian plant geneticist, scientific agricultural selection
- Friedrich Miescher (1844–1895), Swiss biologist, found weak acid in white blood cells now called DNA
- Margareta Mikkelsen (1923–2004), German-born Danish human geneticist and cytogeneticist
- Lois K. Miller (1945–1999), entomologist and molecular geneticist, studied insect viruses
- O. J. Miller, US physician, human and mammalian genetics and chromosome structure and function
- Aubrey Milunsky (born c. 1936), South African-US physician, medical geneticist, writer, prenatal diagnosis
- Alfred Mirsky (1900–1974), US pioneer in molecular biology, hemoglobin structure, constancy of DNA
- Herschel K. Mitchell (1913–2000), US Research on Drosophila (fruit flies), in particular the genetics and biochemistry of the heat shock response.
- Felix Mitelman (born 1940), Swedish cancer geneticist and cytogeneticist, catalog of chromosomes in cancer

=== Mo–Mu ===
- Jan Mohr (1921–2009), Norwegian-Danish pioneer in human gene mapping
- Jacques Monod (1910–1976), French molecular biologist, Nobel Prize-winner
- P. A. P. Moran (1917–1988), Australian statistician and theoretical population geneticist, known for the Moran model of finite populations
- Lilian Vaughan Morgan (1870–1952), American experimental biologist who studied the genetics of the fruit fly Drosophila melanogaster. She was the wife of T. H. Morgan
- T. H. Morgan (1866–1945), American evolutionary biologist, geneticist, embryologist; the first geneticist to win the Nobel Prize
- Newton E. Morton (1929–2018), population geneticist and genetic epidemiologist
- Arno Motulsky (1923–2018), German-US hematologist who influenced medical genetics and founded pharmacogenetics
- Arthur Mourant (1904–1994), British hematologist, first to examine worldwide blood group distributions
- H. J. Muller (1890–1967), US Drosophila geneticist, Nobel Prize for producing mutations by X-rays
- Hans J. Müller-Eberhard (1927–1998), German-US immunogeneticist, immunoglobulins and complement
- Kary Mullis (1944–2019), US biochemist, Nobel Prize for the polymerase chain reaction (PCR)

== N ==
- Walter Nance (1933–2021), US internist and geneticist, research on twins and genetics of deafness
- Daniel Nathans (1928–1999), US microbiologist, Nobel Prize for restriction endonucleases
- James V. Neel (1915–2000), US human geneticist who contributed to the development of research on human genetics, and founded the first genetics clinic in the US
- Frederick C. Neidhardt (1931–2016), US microbiologist, pioneer in molecular physiology and proteomics of E. coli
- Oliver Nelson (1920–2001), US maize geneticist, profound impact on agriculture and basic genetics
- Walter Nelson-Rees (1929–2009), US cytogeneticist, confirmed HeLa cells contamination of other cell lines
- Eugene Nester (20th–21st century), US microbial geneticist, genetics of Agrobacterium (crown gall formation)
- Masatoshi Nei (1931–2023), Japanese theoretical population geneticist and pioneer in molecular phylogenetics
- Marshall W. Nirenberg (1927–2010), US geneticist, biochemist and Nobel Prize-winner
- Eva Nogales (born 1965), Spanish biophysicist studying eukaryotic transcription and translation initiation complexes
- Edward Novitski (1918–2006), US Drosophila geneticist, pioneer in chromosome mechanics
- Paul Nurse (born 1949), UK biochemist, Nobel Prize for work on CDK, a key regulator of the cell cycle
- Christiane Nüsslein-Volhard (born 1942), German developmental biologist and Nobel Prize-winner
- William Nyhan (1926–2026), US pediatrician and biochemical geneticist, described Lesch–Nyhan syndrome

== O ==
- Severo Ochoa (1905–1993), Spanish-American biochemist, Nobel Prize for work on the synthesis of RNA
- Susumu Ohno (1928–2000), Japanese-US biologist, evolutionary cytogenetics and molecular evolution
- Tomoko Ohta (born 1933), Japanese scientist in molecular evolution, the nearly neutral theory of evolution
- Clarence Paul Oliver (1898–1991), US geneticist, switched from Drosophila to human genetics
- Olufunmilayo Olopade (born 1957), Nigerian oncologist known for research on genetics of breast cancer and health disparities
- Jane M. Olson (1952–2004), US genetic epidemiologist and biostatistician
- Maynard Olson (born 1943), US geneticist, pioneered map of yeast genome and Human Genome Project
- John Opitz (1935–2023), German-American medical geneticist, expert on dysmorphology and syndromes
- Harry Ostrer (born 1951), US medical geneticist, studies origins of Jewish people
- Ray Owen (1915–2014), US geneticist, immunologist, found cattle blood groups and chimeric twin calves

== P ==
=== Pa–Pi ===
- Svante Pääbo (born 1955), Swedish molecular anthropologist in Leipzig studying Neanderthal genome
- David Page (born 1956), US physician and geneticist who mapped, cloned and sequenced the human Y chromosome
- Theophilus Painter (1889–1969), US zoologist, studied fruit fly and human testis chromosomes
- Arthur Pardee (1921–2019), US scientist who discovered restriction point in the cell cycle
- Mary-Lou Pardue (1933–2024), American geneticist at MIT
- Klaus Patau (1908–1975), German-American cytogeneticist, described trisomy 13
- Andrew H. Paterson, US geneticist, research leader in plant genomics
- John Thomas Patterson (1878–1960), American embryologist and geneticist who studied isolating mechanisms
- Linus Pauling (1901–1994), US chemist, won Nobel Prizes for chemical bonds and peace
- Crodowaldo Pavan (1919–2009), Brazilian biologist, fly geneticist, and influential scientist in Brazil
- Rose Payne (1909–1999), US transplant geneticist, key to discovery and development of HLA system
- Raymond Pearl (1879–1940), US biologist, biostatistician, rejected eugenics
- Karl Pearson (1857–1936), British statistician, made key contributions to genetic analysis
- Caroline Pellew (1882–1963), British geneticist who studied the laws of inheritance in peas
- Lionel Penrose (1898–1972), British psychiatrist, human geneticist, pioneered genetics of mental retardation
- Max Perutz (1914–2002), Austrian-British molecular biologist, Nobel Prize for structure of hemoglobin
- Massimo Pigliucci (born 1964), Italian-US plant ecological and evolutionary geneticist. Winner of the Dobzhansky Prize

=== Pl–Pu ===
- Alfred Ploetz (1860–1940), German physician, biologist, eugenicist, introduced racial hygiene to Germany
- Robert Plomin (born 1948), American/British psychologist and geneticist known for his work in twin studies
- Paul Polani (1914–2006), Trieste-born UK pediatrician, major catalyst of medical genetics in Britain
- Charles Pomerat (1905–1951), US cell biologist, pioneered the field of tissue culture
- Guido Pontecorvo (1907–1999), Italian-born Scottish geneticist and pioneer molecular biologist
- Alkes Price (Ph.D. 1997), American geneticist known for statistical methods to draw inference from genetic data, including genomic ancestry quantification and heritability estimation
- George R. Price (1922–1975), brilliant but troubled US population geneticist and theoretical biologist
- Peter Propping (1942–2016), German human geneticist, studies of epilepsy
- Mark Ptashne (born 1940), US molecular biologist, studies of genetic switch, phage lambda
- Ted Puck (1916–2005), US physicist, work in mammalian and human cell culture, genetics, cytogenetics
- Reginald Punnett (1875–1967), early English geneticist, discovered linkage with William Bateson, stimulated G. H. Hardy
- Shaun Purcell (21st century), British psychiatric geneticist who developed the PLINK genetic program

== Q ==
- Lluis Quintana-Murci (born 1970), French-Spanish human population geneticist, human evolutionary genetics, evolution of immunity

== R ==
=== Ra–Ri ===
- G. N. Ramachandran (1922–2001) Indian biophysicist, co-discovered triple-helix structure of collagen
- Michèle Ramsay (21st century), South African geneticist, single-gene disorders, epigenetics, complex diseases
- Robert Race (1907–1984), British expert on blood groups, along with wife Ruth Sanger
- Sheldon C. Reed (1910–2003), US pioneer in genetic counseling and behavioral genetics
- David Reich (born 1974), US, human population genetics and genomics, did humans and chimps interbreed?
- Theodore Reich (1938–2003), Canadian-US psychiatrist, a founder of modern psychiatric genetics
- Otto Renner (1883–1960), German plant geneticist, established maternal plastid inheritance
- Marcus Rhoades (1903–1991), US maize (corn) geneticist and cytogeneticist
- Alexander Rich (1925–2015), US biologist, biophysicist, discovered Z-DNA and tRNA 3-dimensional structure
- Rollin C. Richmond (21st century), US, evolutionary and pharmacogenetic studies of Drosophila, university administrator
- Ralph Riley FRS (1924–1999), British geneticist who worked in plant breeding
- David L. Rimoin (1936–2012), Canadian–US medical geneticist, studied skeletal dysplasias
- Neil Risch (Ph.D. 1979), US human and population geneticist, studied torsion dystonia

=== Ro–Ru ===
- Richard Roberts (born 1943), British molecular biologist, Nobel Prize for introns and gene-splicing
- Arthur Robinson (1914–2000), US pediatrician, geneticist, pioneer on sex chromosome anomalies
- Herschel L. Roman (1914–1989), US geneticist, innovated in analysis in maize and budding yeast
- Irwin Rose (1926–2015), US biologist, Nobel Prize for ubiquitin-mediated protein degradation
- Leon Rosenberg (1933–2022), US physician-geneticist, molecular basis of inherited metabolic disease
- David S Rosenblatt (20th–21st century), Canadian geneticist concerned inborn errors of folate and vitamin B_{12} metabolism
- Peyton Rous (1879–1970), US tumor virologist and tissue culture expert, Nobel Prize
- Janet Rowley (1925–2013), US cancer cytogeneticist who found Ph chromosome due to translocation
- Peter T. Rowley (1929–2006), US internist and geneticist, genetics of cancer and leukemia
- Frank Ruddle (1929–2013), US biologist, somatic cell genetics, human gene mapping, paved way for transgenic mice
- Ernst Rüdin (1874–1952), Swiss psychiatrist, geneticist and eugenicist who promoted racial hygiene
- Elizabeth S. Russell (1913–2001), US mammalian geneticist, pioneering work on pigmentation, blood-forming cells, and germ cells
- Liane B. Russell (1923–2019), Austrian-born US mouse geneticist and radiation biologist
- William L. Russell (1910–2003), UK-US mouse geneticist, pioneered study of mutagenesis in mice

== S ==
=== Sa–Sc ===
- Leo Sachs (1924–2013), German-Israeli molecular cancer biologist, colony-stimulating factors, interleukins
- Ruth Sager (1918–1997), US geneticist, pioneer of cytoplasmic genetics, tumor suppressor genes
- Joseph Sambrook (1939–2019), British viral geneticist known for studies of DNA oncoviruses
- Avery A. Sandberg (1921–2016), US internist, discovered XYY in 1961, expert on chromosomes in cancer
- Lodewijk A. Sandkuijl (1953–2002), Dutch expert on genetic epidemiology and statistical genetics
- Larry Sandler (1929–1987), US Drosophila geneticist, chromosome mechanics, devoted teacher
- Fred Sanger (1918–2013), UK biochemist, two Nobel Prizes, sequence of insulin, DNA sequencing method
- Ruth Sanger (1918–2001), Australian expert on blood groups, along with husband Robert Race
- Karl Sax (1892–1973), US botanist and cytogeneticist, effects of radiation on chromosomes
- Paul Schedl (born 1947), US molecular biologist, genetic regulation of developmental pathways in fruit fly
- Timothy Schedl (born 1955) US geneticist who studies germline development of C. elegans
- Albert Schinzel (born 1944), Austrian human geneticist, clinical genetics, karyotype-phenotype correlations
- Werner Schmid (1930–2002), Swiss pioneer in human cytogenetics, described cat eye syndrome
- Gertrud Schüpbach (born 1950), Swiss-US biologist, molecular and genetic mechanisms in oogenesis
- Charles Scriver (1930–2023), Canadian pediatrician, biochemical geneticist, newborn metabolic screening

=== Se–Sh ===
- Ernest Robert Sears (1910–1991), US wheat geneticist who pioneered methods of transferring desirable genes from wild relatives to cultivated wheat in order to increase wheat's resistance to various insects and diseases
- Jay Seegmiller (1920–2006), US human biochemical geneticist, found cause of Lesch–Nyhan syndrome
- Fred Sherman (1932–2013), US geneticist, one of the "fathers" and mentors of modern yeast genetics
- Ilham Shahmuradov (born 1958), Azerbaijani specialist in eukarytic genomes
- Pak Sham (20th–21st century), geneticist known for his work in psychiatric genomics
- Larry Shapiro, US pediatric geneticist, lysosomal storage disorders, X chromosome inactivation
- Lucy Shapiro (born 1940), US molecular geneticist, gene expression during the cell cycle, bacterium Caulobacter
- Phillip Sharp (born 1944), US geneticist and molecular biologist, Nobel Prize for co-discovery of gene splicing
- Philip Sheppard (1921–1976), UK population geneticist, lepidopterist, human blood group researcher
- George Harrison Shull (1874–1954), US geneticist, made key discoveries including heterosis

=== Sj–Sm ===
- Torsten Sjögren (1896–1974), Swedish psychiatrist, geneticist and eugenicist
- Mark Skolnick (born 1946), US geneticist, developed Restriction Fragment Length Polymorphisms (RFLPs) for genetic mapping, and founded Myriad Genetics
- Obaid Siddiqi (1932–2013), Indian neurogeneticist, pioneer on olfactory sense of fruit fly Drosophila
- David Sillence (born 1944), Australian clinical geneticist, pioneered training of Australian geneticists, research in bone dysplasias, classified osteogenesis imperfecta
- Norman Simmons (1915–2004), US DNA research pioneer, who donated pure DNA to Rosalind Franklin in the prelude to the double helix discovery
- Piotr Słonimski (1922–2009), Polish-Parisian yeast geneticist, pioneer of mitochondrial heredity
- William S. Sly (1932–2025), US biochemical geneticist, mucopolysaccharidosis type VII (Sly syndrome)
- Cedric A. B. Smith (1917–2002), British statistician who made key contributions to statistical genetics
- David W. Smith (1926–1981), US pediatrician, influential dysmorphologist, named fetal alcohol syndrome
- Hamilton Smith (1931–2025), US microbiologist, Nobel Prize for restriction endonucleases
- Michael Smith (1932–2000), UK-born Canadian biochemist, Nobel Prize for site-directed mutagenesis
- Oliver Smithies (1925–2017), UK/US molecular geneticist, inventor, gel electrophoresis, knockout mice

=== Sn–Sp ===
- George Snell (1903–1996), US mouse geneticist, pioneer transplant immunologist, won Nobel Prize
- Lawrence H. Snyder (1901–1986), US pioneer in medical genetics, studied blood groups
- Robert R. Sokal (1925–2012), Austrian-born US biological anthropologist and biostatistician.
- Tracy M. Sonneborn (1905–1981), protozoan biologist and geneticist
- Ed Southern (born 1938), UK molecular biologist, invented Southern blot and DNA microarray technologies
- Hans Spemann (1869–1941) German embryologist, Nobel Prize for discovery of embryonic induction

=== St ===
- David Stadler, US geneticist, mechanisms of mutation and recombination in Neurospora
- L. J. Stadler (1896–1954), US maize geneticist who studied mutagenic effects of radiation
- Frank Stahl (1929–2025), US molecular biologist known for the Meselson-Stahl experiment
- David States (PhD 1983), US geneticist and bioinformatician, computational study of human genome and proteome
- G. Ledyard Stebbins (1906–2000), US botanist, geneticist and evolutionary biologist
- Michael Stebbins (21st century), US geneticist, science writer, editor and activist
- Emmy Stein (1879–1954), German botanist and geneticist
- Charles M. Steinberg (1932-1999), US geneticist, fundamental contributions to bacterial virus genetics and antibody diversity
- Joan A. Steitz (born 1941), US molecular biologist, pioneering studies of snRNAs and snRNPs (snurps)
- Gunther Stent (1924–2008), German-born US molecular geneticist, phage worker, philosopher of science
- Curt Stern (1902–1981), German-born US Drosophila and human geneticist
- Nettie Stevens (1861–1912), US geneticist, studied chromosomal basis of sex and discovered XY basis
- Miodrag Stojković (born 1964), Serbian geneticist, working in Europe on mammalian cloning
- George Streisinger (1927–1984), US geneticist, work on bacterial viruses, frameshift mutations
- Alfred Sturtevant (1891–1970), US geneticist who constructed the first genetic map of a chromosome

=== Su–Sz ===
- John Sulston (1942–2018), UK molecular biologist, Nobel Prize for programmed cell death in C. elegans
- Maurice Super (1936–2006), South African-born UK pediatric geneticist, studied cystic fibrosis
- Andrea Superti-Furga (born 1959), Swiss and Italian paediatrician and geneticist, studied disorder of connective tissue, skeletal dysplasias and malformation syndromes
- Grant Sutherland (born 1945), Australian molecular cytogeneticist, pioneer on human fragile sites, human genome
- Walter Sutton (1877–1916), US surgeon and scientist, proved chromosomes contained genes
- David Suzuki (born 1936), Canadian Drosophila geneticist, science broadcaster and environmental activist
- M. S. Swaminathan (1925–2023), Indian agricultural scientist, geneticist, leader of Green Revolution in India
- Bryan Sykes (1947–2020), British human geneticist, discovered ways to extract DNA from fossilized bones
- Jack Szostak (born 1952), Anglo-US geneticist, worked on recombination, artificial chromosomes, and on telomeres. He was awarded a Nobel Prize for his work on telomeres.

== T ==
- Jantina Tammes (1871–1947), Dutch geneticist, one of the first Dutch scientists to report on variability and evolution
- Edward Tatum (1909–1975), showed genes control individual steps in metabolism
- Joyce Taylor-Papadimitriou (born 1932), British molecular biologist and geneticist
- Howard Temin (1934–1994), US geneticist, Nobel Prize for discovery of reverse transcriptase
- Alan Templeton (PhD 1972), US geneticist and biostatistician, molecular evolution, evolutionary biology
- Joseph R. Testa (born 1947), US cancer geneticist and malignant mesothelioma biologist whose team cloned AKT genes and co-discovered the BAP1 tumor predisposition syndrome
- Eeva Therman (1916–2004), Finnish-born US geneticist who helped characterize and find the molecular basis for trisomy 13 and trisomy 18
- Donnall Thomas (1920–2012), US physician, Nobel Prize for bone marrow transplantation for leukemia
- Nikolay Timofeev-Ressovsky (1900–1981), Russian radiation and evolution geneticist
- Alfred Tissières (1917–2003), Swiss molecular geneticist who pioneered molecular biology in Geneva
- Joe Hin Tjio (1919–2001), Java-born US geneticist who first discovered humans have 46 chromosomes
- Susumu Tonegawa (1939–2026), Japanese molecular biologist; Nobel Prize for genetics of antibody diversity
- Erich von Tschermak (1871–1962), Austrian agronomist and one of the re-discoverers of Mendel's laws
- Lap-chee Tsui (born 1950), Chinese geneticist who sequenced first human gene (for cystic fibrosis) with Francis Collins
- Elena Jane Tucker (Ph.D. 2011), Australian geneticist investigating mitochondrial disease
- Raymond Turpin (1895–1988), French pediatrician, geneticist, Lejeune's co-discoverer of trisomy 21

== U ==
- Axel Ullrich (born 1943), German molecular biologist, signal transduction, discovered oncogene, Herceptin
- Irene Ayako Uchida (1917–2013), one of the first Canadian geneticists and cytogeneticists. Down syndrome

== V ==
- Harold Varmus (born 1939), US Nobel Prize-winner for oncogenes, head of NIH
- Rajeev Kumar Varshney (born 1973), Indian geneticist, principal scientist at ICRISAT and theme leader at Generation Challenge Programme
- Nikolai Vavilov (1887–1943), Russian botanist and geneticist, anti-Lysenko, died in prison
- Craig Venter (1946–2026), US molecular biologist and entrepreneur, raced to sequence the genome
- Jerome Vinograd (1913–1976), US, leader in biochemistry and molecular biology of nucleic acids
- Peter Visscher (Ph.D. 1991), Dutch Australian geneticist who works on the genetic architecture of complex traits
- Friedrich Vogel (1925–2006), German, leader in human genetics, coined term "pharmacogenetics"
- Bert Vogelstein (born 1949), US pediatrician and cancer geneticist, series of mutations in colorectal cancer
- Erik Adolf von Willebrand (1870–1949), Finnish internist who found commonest bleeding disorder

== W ==
=== Wa–We ===
- Petrus Johannes Waardenburg (1886–1979), Dutch ophthalmologist, geneticist, Waardenburg syndrome
- C. H. Waddington (1905–1975), British developmental biologist, paleontologist, geneticist, embryologist
- Alfred Russel Wallace (1823–1913) British biologist who proposed natural selection theory independently of Darwin
- Douglas C. Wallace (born 1946), US mitochondrial geneticist, pioneered the use of human mtDNA as a molecular marker
- Peter Walter (born 1954), German-US molecular biologist studying protein folding and protein targeting
- Richard H. Ward (1943–2003), English-born New Zealand human and anthropological geneticist
- James D. Watson (1928–2025), US molecular geneticist, Nobel Prize for discovery of the double helix
- David Weatherall (1933–2018), UK physician, geneticist, pioneer in hemoglobin and molecular medicine
- Jean Weigle (1901–1968), Swiss molecular geneticist in US, inducible nature of DNA repair systems
- Robert Weinberg (born 1942), US, discovered first human oncogene and first tumor suppressor gene
- Wilhelm Weinberg (1862–1937), German physician, formulated basic law of population genetics
- Spencer Wells (born 1969), US genetic anthropologist, head of Genographic Project to map past migrations
- Susan R. Wessler (born 1953), US plant molecular geneticist, transposable elements re genetic diversity

=== Wh–Wi ===
- Raymond L. White (1943–2018), US cancer geneticist, cloned APC colon cancer gene and neurofibromatosis gene
- Chester B. Whitley (born 1950), US geneticist, pioneered treatment of lysosomal diseases
- Glayde Whitney (1939–2002), US behavioral geneticist, accused of supporting scientific racism
- Reed Wickner (born c. 1942), US molecular geneticist, yeast phenotypes due to prion forms of native proteins
- Alexander S. Wiener (1907–1976), U.S. immunologist, discovered Rh blood groups with Landsteiner
- Eric F. Wieschaus (born 1947), US developmental biologist and Nobel Prize-winner
- Maurice Wilkins (1916–2004), New Zealand-born British Nobel Prize-winner with Watson and Crick
- Huntington Willard (born c. 1953), US human geneticist, X chromosome inactivation, gene silencing
- Robley Williams (1908–1995), US virologist, recreated tobacco mosaic virus from its RNA + protein coat
- Ian Wilmut (1944–2023), UK reproductive biologist who first cloned a mammal (lamb named Dolly)
- Allan Wilson (1934–1991), New Zealand-US innovator in molecular study of human evolution
- David Sloan Wilson (born 1949), US evolutionary biologist and geneticist
- Edmund Beecher Wilson (1856–1939), US zoologist, geneticist, discovered XY and XX sex chromosomes
- Øjvind Winge (1886–1964), Danish biologist and pioneer in yeast genetics

=== Wo–Wr ===
- Carl Woese (1928–2012), US biologist, defined Archaea as new domain of life, rRNA phylogenetic tool
- Ulrich Wolf (1933–2017), German cytogeneticist, found chromosome 4p deletion in Wolf–Hirschhorn syndrome
- Barnet Woolf FRSE (1902–1983). British geneticist at Edinburgh University, biochemist, epidemiologist, statistician, etc.
- Melaku Worede (1936–2023), Ethiopian conservationist and geneticist
- Naomi Wray (Ph.D. 1989), Australian geneticist known for her work on genetics of complex traits
- Sewall Wright (1889–1988), US geneticist who, with Ronald Fisher, united genetics and evolution

== Y ==
- Jian Yang (20th–21st century), Chinese geneticist, known for his work on the missing heritability of complex traits
- Charles Yanofsky (1925–2018), US molecular geneticist, colinearity of gene and its protein product

== Z ==
- Floyd Zaiger (1926–2020), US fruit geneticist and entrepreneur
- Virginia Zakian (PhD 1975) Molecular Biologist at Princeton University
- Lore Zech (1923—2013), German geneticist and cytogenetics researcher
- Hans Zellweger (1909–1990) Swiss-US pediatrician and clinical geneticist, described Zellweger syndrome
- Norton Zinder (1928–2012), US biologist and phage worker who discovered genetic transduction
- Rolf M. Zinkernagel (born 1944), Swiss immunologist, won Nobel Prize for immune recognition of antigen

== See also ==
- List of biochemists
- List of biologists
