= Paula Hertwig =

German biologist and politician

Paula Herwig
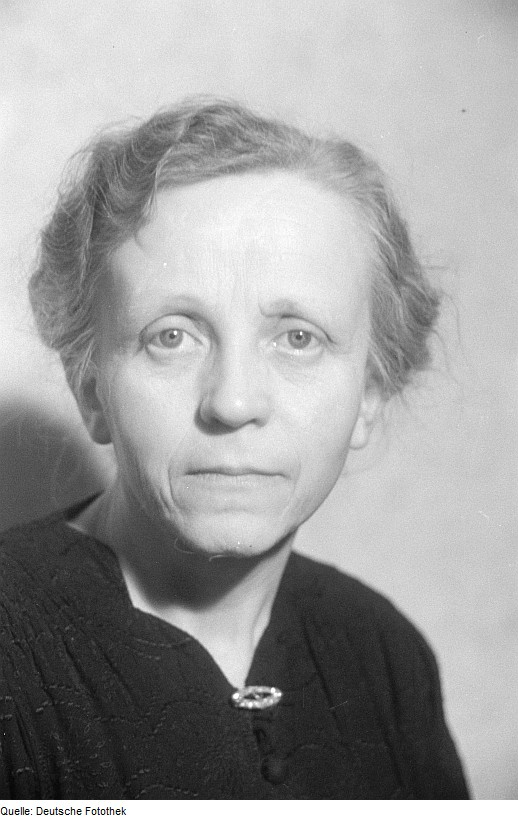
- Herwig in 1947
- Born: Paula Julie Elisabeth Hertwig; 11 October 1889; Berlin, German Empire
- Died: 31 March 1983 (aged 93); Villingen-Schwenningen, West Germany
- Education: University of Berlin
- Occupations: Biologist, politician
- Known for: Hertwig-Weyers syndrome
- Political party: German Democratic Party
- Awards: National Prize of the German Democratic Republic; Patriotic Order of Merit

Paula Julie Elisabeth Hertwig (11 October 1889 – 31 March 1983) was a German biologist and politician. Her research focused on radiation health effects. Hertwig was the first woman to habilitate at the then Friedrich-Wilhelms-Universität Berlin (now Humboldt University of Berlin) in the field of zoology. She was also the first biologist at a German university. Hertwig is one of the founders of radiation genetics alongside Emmy Stein. Hertwig-Weyers syndrome, which describes oligodactyly in humans as a result of radiation exposure, is named after her and her colleague, Helmut Weyers.

== Biography ==
Paula Julie Elisabeth Hertwig was born in Berlin on 11 October 1889. She was the daughter of Oscar Hertwig, a university professor; sister of the anatomist, Günther Hertwig; and niece of the zoologist, Richard Hertwig. She graduated from high school in 1908, at the Realgymnasium. She studied zoology, botany, and chemistry at the University of Berlin, medical PhD. After that she was an assistant at the Anatomical-Biological Institute of the University of Berlin.

From 1916 to 1921, Hertwig was an unpaid zoology assistant in her father's Anatomical Institute. She habilitated in 1919, as the first woman at the then Friedrich-Wilhelms-Universität Berlin (now Humboldt University of Berlin) in the field of zoology. Afterwards, she was a Privatdozentin for General Biology and Heredity at this institute. In 1921, she was also appointed as an assistant to the Institute for heredity and breeding research of the Agricultural College, where she worked for Erwin Baur. From 1927 to 1945, she was associate professor of genetics at the Biological-Anatomical Institute of the Medical Faculty of the University of Berlin. As the first biologist at a German university, she taught biology there for medical students. In 1940, she was appointed Head of the Zoological Department of the Institute of Inheritance.

Hertwig, who belonged to the German Democratic Party, was elected in 1932 as a deputy to the Landtag of Prussia and, in February 1933, again to the last Prussian Landtag.

In the period of Nazi Germany in 1937, she was a member of the National Socialist German Lecturers League, but did not join the Nazi Party. From 1937, she worked with the Max Planck Institute for Brain Research and became a secretary of the Deutschen Gesellschaft für Vererbungswissenschaft (German Society of Inheritance). From 1939, she also worked as a research assistant at the Institute of Heredity and Breeding Research of the University of Berlin in Zehlendorf. In the years 1941 to 1942, she participated in the DFG research project Erbschädigungsprobuche on mice.

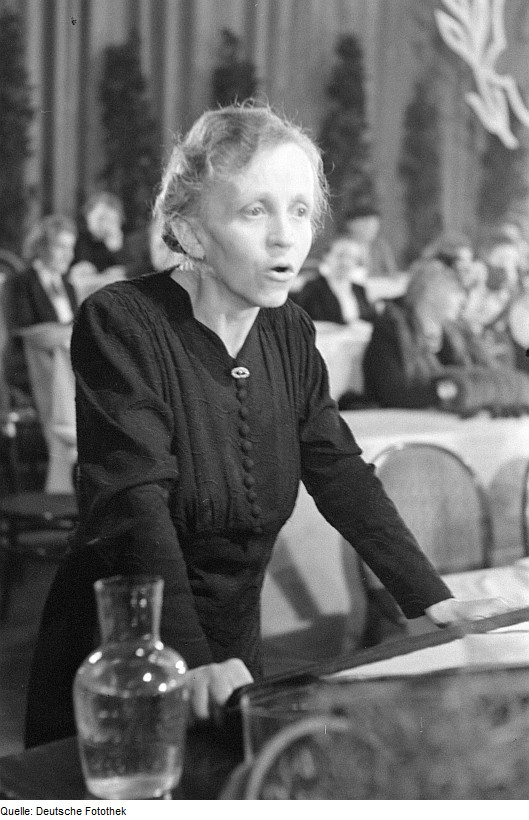
Hertwig at the founding congress of the Democratic Women's League of Germany on 7–9 March 1947 in the Admiralspalast in Berlin.

In May 1945, she received a call to the Faculty of Medicine of the Martin Luther University of Halle-Wittenberg, where in 1948, she became professor of General Biology and Heredity. At the founding congress of the Democratic Women's League of Germany (DFD) in March 1947, she was elected a member of the Federal Executive Committee. From 1947 to 1948, she was chair of the state association Saxony-Anhalt of the DFD; and from March 1948 to March 1949, a member of the 1st People's Council in the Soviet occupation zone (SBZ).

In 1953, she was elected a member of the Academy of Sciences Leopoldina. Since 1955, she was a member of the Saxon Academy of Sciences and Humanities. In 1956, she was awarded the National Prize of the German Democratic Republic and the Patriotic Order of Merit in bronze, and in 1959, the title of Outstanding Scientist of the People. The following year she retired.

In 1972, Hertwig moved to Villingen-Schwenningen in the Black Forest. In June of the same year, the Faculty of Medicine of Heidelberg University awarded her an honorary doctorate.

Hertwig is one of the founders of radiation genetics alongside Emmy Stein. Hertwig-Weyers syndrome, which describes oligodactyly in humans as a result of radiation exposure, is named after her and her colleague, Helmut Weyers.

Hertwig died in Villingen-Schwenningen on 31 March 1983.

== Selected works ==
- Durch Radiumbestrahlung verursachte Entwicklung von halbkernigen Triton- und Fischembryonen, 1916
- Ein neuer Fall von multiplen Allelomorphismus bei Antirrhinum, 1926
- Handbuch der Vererbungswissenschaft. III, A. u. C, Partielle Keimesschädigungen durch RAdium und Röntgenstrahlen, 1927
- Die genetischen Grundlagen der Röntgenmutation, 1932
- Energiehaushalt: besondere Einflüsse auf Ernährung und Stoffwechsel, 1932
- Die künstliche Erzeugung von Mutationen und ihre theoretischen und praktischen Auswirkungen, 1932
- Handbuch der Ernahrung und des Stoffwechsels der Landwirtschaftlichen Nutztiere als Grundlagen der Futterungslehre. 4, Energiehaushalt. besondere Einflusse auf Ernahrung und Stoffwechsel, 1932
- Geschlechtsgebundene und autosomale Koppelungen bei Hühnern, 1933
- Deutsche Gesellschaft Vererbungswissenschaft: Bericht über die ... Jahresversammlung Im Auftrage der Gesellschaft herausgegeben von Paula Hertwig., 1934
- Erbanlage und Umwelt, 1934
- Der Alkohol in seiner Wirkung auf die Fortpflanzungszellen, 1935
- Artbastarde bei Tieren, 1936
- Handbuch der Vererbungswissenschaft, 1936
- Strahlenschäden und Strahlenschutz im zellulären Bereich, 1957
- Anpassung, Vererbung und Evolution., 1959
- Differences in the development capabilities of F₁ mice after x-raying of spermatogoniia and mature and immature spermatozoa, 1959
