= Phyllis McAlpine =

Canadian geneticist

- Born: 29 August 1941
- Died: 1 October 1998 (aged 56–57); Winnipeg, Manitoba, Canada
- Resting place: Kilmartin Cemetery, Middlesex County, Ontario, Canada
- Education: University of Western Ontario; University of Toronto; University College London
- Known for: Gene nomenclature guidelines
- Awards: Founders Award for Excellence from the Canadian College of Medical Geneticists
- Scientific career
- Fields: Genetics
- Institutions: University of Manitoba
- Thesis: Studies on the genetic variation of phosphoglucomutase in man (1970)
- Doctoral advisor: Harry Harris

Phyllis Jean McAlpine (29 August 1941 – 1 October 1998) was a Canadian geneticist. She was a pioneer in mapping the human genome and served as Chair of the HUGO Gene Nomenclature Committee.

== Education ==
McAlpine was awarded an honours bachelor's degree at Western University where she won a gold medal in zoology. She received a master's degree from the University of Toronto in 1966. Her thesis was called An assessment of the creatine kinase test in the detection of carriers of Duchenne muscular dystrophy. She went on to complete a PhD at University College London in 1970 with a thesis entitled Studies on the genetic variation of phosphoglucomutase in man. McAlpine was mentored and supervised by women in her field throughout her education. Her undergraduate work was performed under Helen Battle, and Margaret Thompson was her advisor in Toronto. Her PhD supervisor was Harry Harris.

== Career ==
McAlpine returned to Canada after her PhD to work as a postdoctoral fellow at Queen's University from 1970 to 1972 in the group of Nancy Simpson. McAlpine participated in a project to study genetic traits of peoples in the Arctic, living in northern Canada for a month in 1970.

In 1972, she started working at the University of Manitoba. Her main research focus was on mapping human genes. She served on the university senate between 1981 and 1985 and was Chair of the University Discipline Committee between 1990 and 1994. She was granted full professorship in 1985. From 1993 until her death, she was Chair of the Department of Human Genetics.

McAlpine was part of a group of geneticists who recognised the importance of standardised nomenclatures across all human genes and homologous genes in other species. She founded the HUGO Gene Nomenclature Committee and was Chair of the committee from 1992 until 1996. When she retired, her workload was so significant as to be divided between three full-time staff members. She contributed to the creation of guidelines and provided pre-publication services to researchers to ensure consistent gene labelling. She became known as the foremost expert and leader in gene nomenclature.

McAlpine was also a member of the American Society of Human Genetics since 1965 and was president of the Genetics Society of Canada in 1995. She was President of the Manitoba Chapter of the Canadian Association of Women in Science in 1993–1994.

== Awards and honours ==
- 1998 Founders Award for Excellence from the Canadian College of Medical Geneticists.
- 1996 Honoured by Human Genome Organization at a special presentation in Heidelberg.
- 1996 Fellow of the American Association for the Advancement of Science.
- Fellow of the Canadian College of Medical Geneticists.

== Personal life ==
McAlpine was involved in church activities. She served as President of the Manitoba Opera Guild from 1976 to 1978.

She died from breast cancer in Winnipeg on 1 October 1998. Her grave is in Kilmartin Cemetery, Middlesex County, Ontario.

She left a personal bequest to the University of Manitoba Department of Biochemistry and Medical Genetics to create a graduate fellowship in her name supporting students researching medical genetics.
