= Neuried =

Neuried (Baden)
- Municipality
- Coat of arms

- Location of Neuried (Baden) within Ortenaukreis district
- Interactive map of Neuried (Baden)
- Location within Germany Location within Baden-Württemberg
- Coordinates: 48°27′55″N 07°48′14″E
- Country: Germany
- State: Baden-Württemberg
- Admin. region: Freiburg
- District: Ortenaukreis

Government
  - Mayor (2021–29): Tobias Uhrich

Area
  - Total: 57.84 km^{2} (22.33 sq mi)
- Elevation: 150 m (490 ft)

Population (2025-12-31)
  - Total: 9,980
  - Density: 173/km^{2} (447/sq mi)
- Time zone: UTC+01:00 (CET)
  - Summer (DST): UTC+02:00 (CEST)
- Postal codes: 77743
- Dialling codes: 07807
- Vehicle registration: OG, BH, KEL, LR, WOL
- Website: www.neuried.net

Neuried (German pronunciation: [ˈnɔʏʁiːt]; Low Alemannic: Neiriäd) is a municipality in the district of Ortenau in Baden-Württemberg in Germany.

== Ortsteile ==
- Altenheim
- Dundenheim
- Ichenheim
- Müllen
- Schutterzell

== Notable people ==
Erwin Baur (1875–1933), geneticist and botanist, was born in Ichenheim

== Demographics ==
Population development:

Year	Inhabitants
1990	7,714
2001	9,046
2011	9,383
2021	9,841
