= Human Heredity =

- Discipline: Human genetics
- Language: English
- Edited by: Pak Sham

Publication details
- Former name(s): Acta Genetica et Statistica Medica
- History: 1948–present
- Publisher: Karger Publishers
- Frequency: 8/year
- Impact factor: 0.542 (2017)

Standard abbreviations
- ISO 4: Hum. Hered.

Indexing
- CODEN: HUHEAS
- ISSN: 0001-5652 (print); 1423-0062 (web)
- LCCN: 92643031
- OCLC no.: 800128857

Links
- Journal homepage

Human Heredity is a peer-reviewed scientific journal covering all aspects of human genetics. It was established in 1948 as Acta Genetica et Statistica Medica, obtaining its current name in 1969. It is published eight times per year by Karger Publishers and the editor-in-chief is Pak Sham (University of Hong Kong). According to the Journal Citation Reports, the journal has a 2017 impact factor of 0.542.
