= Human Genetics (journal) =

- Discipline: Human genetics
- Language: English
- Edited by: David N. Cooper, Thomas J. Hudson

Publication details
- Former name(s): Humangenetik
- History: 1964-present
- Publisher: Springer Science+Business Media
- Frequency: Biweekly
- Open access: Hybrid
- Impact factor: 5.3 (2022)

Standard abbreviations
- ISO 4: Hum. Genet.

Indexing
- ISSN: 0340-6717 (print); 1432-1203 (web)
- LCCN: 2004233658
- OCLC no.: 663900873

Links
- Journal homepage; Online archive

Human Genetics is a peer-reviewed medical journal covering all aspects of human genetics, including legal and social issues. It was established in 1964 by Arno Motulsky and Friedrich Vogel as the German-language Humangenetik, obtaining its current title in 1976. It is published by Springer Science+Business Media. Its editors-in-chief are David N. Cooper (Cardiff University) and Thomas J. Hudson (Ontario Institute for Cancer Research). According to the Journal Citation Reports, the journal has a 2022 impact factor of 5.3.

== Ethics scandal ==
The journal published findings exploring the DNA of physical appearance traits of Uighur men from Tumxuk in 2019. One of the authors of the paper on DNA phenotyping said he had been unaware of the origins of the DNA samples. Springer Nature was reported to want to strengthen its ethics guidelines regarding "vulnerable groups of people" per a New York Times report.
