= PLINK (genetic tool-set) =

Whole genome association analysis toolset

- Developers: Shaun Purcell; Christopher Chang (PLINK 1.9/2.0)
- Initial release: 2007
- Stable release: 1.9 / December 2015
- Written in: C, C++
- Operating system: Windows, macOS, Linux
- Platform: Command-line interface
- Available in: English
- Type: Bioinformatics software
- License: GNU General Public License
- Website: www.cog-genomics.org/plink/

PLINK is a free, open-source whole-genome association analysis toolkit used to perform a wide-range of genetic data analysis. It was designed by Shaun Purcell and published in 2007. As of 2025, it has been cited over 35,000 times and is considered to be one of the most used and most comprehensive programs for analyzing SNP genotypes from diverse genetic datasets in population genetics.

PLINK is implemented in C/C++. A significant update was published in 2015 with PLINK v1.9.

== Overview ==
PLINK currently supports following functionalities:

- data management;
- basic statistics (F_{ST}, missing data, tests of Hardy–Weinberg equilibrium, inbreeding coefficient, etc.);
- Linkage disequilibrium (LD) calculation;
- Identity by descent (IBD) and identity by state (IBS) matrix calculation;
- population stratification, such as a Principal component analysis;
- association analysis such as genome-wide association study for both basic case/control studies and quantitative traits;
- tests for epistasis

== Input and output files ==
PLINK has its own format of text files (.ped) and binary text files (.bed) that serve as input files for most analyses. A .map accompanies a .ped file and provides information about variants, while .bim and .fam files accompany .bed files as part of the binary dataset. Additionally, PLINK accepts inputs of VCF, BCF, Oxford, and 23andMe files, which are typically extracted into the binary .bed format prior to performing desired analyses. With certain formats such as VCF, some information such as phase and dosage will be discarded.

PLINK has a variety of output files depending on the analysis. PLINK has the ability to output files for BEAGLE and can recode a .bed file into a VCF for analyses in other programs. Additionally, PLINK is designed to work in conjunction with R, and can output files to be processed by certain R packages.

== Extensions and current developments ==
- PLINK 2.0 a comprehensive update to PLINK, developed by Christopher Chang, with the improved speed of various Genome-wide association (GWA) calculations, including identity-by-state (IBS) matrix calculation, LD-based pruning and association analysis.
- PLINK/SEQ is an open-source C/C++ library designed for analyzing large scale whole-genome and whole-exome studies.
- MQFAM is a multivariate test of association (MQFAM) that can be efficiently applied to large population-based samples and is implemented in PLINK.
