= Thomas J. Hudson =

Canadian genome scientist

- Born: June 12, 1961; Arvida, Quebec, Canada
- Education: Université de Montréal (MD 1985)
- Known for: Contribution to developing a haplotype map of the human genome.
- Scientific career
- Fields: Human genomics
- Workplaces: McGill University Health Centre, Massachusetts Institute of Technology, Whitehead Institute/MIT Center for Genome Research, Ontario Institute for Cancer Research
- Academic advisors: Emil Skamene, David Housman

Thomas James Hudson, O.C., (born June 12, 1961) is a Canadian genome scientist noted for his work in the generation of physical maps of the human and mouse genomes and his role in the development of a haplotype map of the human genome as part of the International HapMap Project.

As director of the McGill University and Genome Quebec Innovation Centre, which he established, Hudson and his team have made a number of discoveries in human genetics. These include genes mutated in rare diseases and genes involved in complex diseases such as asthma, type II diabetes and inflammatory bowel disease.

In July 2006, he was appointed president and scientific director of the Ontario Institute for Cancer Research. He is also editor-in-chief of the journal Human Genetics.

== Early life, education, and early career ==
Hudson was born in 1961 in Arvida, Quebec, where his father was a chemist for Alcan. He earned his M.D. degree in 1985 from the Université de Montréal followed by residencies in internal medicine and clinical immunology and allergy, the latter at McGill University Health Centre. In 1990, after a year of postdoctoral experience under the supervision of Emil Skamene and Danuta Radzioch, he went to the Massachusetts Institute of Technology for a fellowship with David Housman.

At MIT, he was involved with Eric Lander's projects and eventually led the effort to build a physical map of the human genome, a step towards the generation of the complete sequence of the human genome. He supervised a large team of engineers, biologists, computer scientists to build high throughput PCR systems. The robot built by his team, called the "Genomatron", performed up to 300,000 PCR reactions per day. He was also part of an international effort to build a transcript map of the human genome. By 1996, his team had mapped more than 10,000 genes. In 1995, he became the assistant director of the Whitehead Institute/MIT Center for Genome Research a position which he held until 2001.

== Career ==
In 1996, Hudson returned to Montreal where he created the Montreal Genome Centre at McGill University Health Centre . In 2003, with a larger team, the Genome Centre moved into McGill University and Genome Quebec Innovation Centre, a new building. Five technology platforms (genotyping, sequencing, expression profiling, mass spectrometry and Information Technology) were available.

Until 2006, Hudson was also an associate professor in the departments of Human Genetics and Medicine at McGill University and associate physician at the McGill University Health Centre (Division of Immunology and Allergy). The main focus of his research is on the genetic dissection of complex diseases. He identified the identification of the genes involved in the development of Type II diabetes, susceptibility to leprosy, multiple sclerosis, asthma and inflammatory bowel disease. His team findings also include rare disease mutations such as the genes for spastic ataxia of Charlevoix-Saguenay (ARSACS) and Leigh syndrome French-Canadian Type (also known as lactic acidosis), that affect many families from the Saguenay region, of which he is a native.

His 2001 publication on inflammatory bowel disease led to the launch of the International HapMap project. The HapMap, which was completed in October 2005, catalogued genetic variations.

He was Associate Director of the Canadian Genetics Disease Network from 2001 to 2005. He helped launch Genome Canada and Genome Quebec, of which he was the first scientific director in 2002.

In July 2006, Hudson left Montreal to lead the newly created Ontario Institute for Cancer Research in Toronto. Hudson remained acting scientific director of the McGill University and Genome Quebec Innovation Centre, until 2011. He served as Senior Vice President, R&D, and Chief Scientific Officer at AbbVie. He retired from the position in 2024.

== Recognition ==
- In 1998, he was a recipient of Canada's Top 40 Under 40
- In 2000, he received the Scientist of the Year award by Radio-Canada
- In 2001, he received the Robert H. Haynes Young Scientist Award by the Genetics Society of Canada
- In 2002, he received a Burroughs-Wellcome Clinician-Scientist Award
- In 2005, was voted as the person who made the most significant contribution to healthcare by the readers of Maclean's
- In 2006, he was elected to the Royal Society of Canada
- In 2013, he was appointed as an Officer of the Order of Canada

== Personal life ==
Thomas Hudson is married and has five children. One of his six sisters is his twin.
