= Shaun Purcell =

Genetics researcher

- Citizenship: British
- Education: University of Oxford; King's College London
- Known for: PLINK (genetic tool-set)
- Scientific career
- Fields: Statistical genetics
- Institutions: Brigham and Women's Hospital
- Thesis: Sample selection and complex effects in quantitative trait loci analysis (2003)
- Doctoral advisor: Pak Sham; David Fulker

Shaun M. Purcell is a British genetic epidemiologist and statistical geneticist.

He is a senior associate member of the Broad Institute of MIT and Harvard and its Stanley Center for Psychiatric Research. He is also a faculty member at the Brigham and Women's Hospital Department of Psychiatry.

Having studied psychology and statistics at Oxford University, Purcell overcame the death of his supervisor David Fulker one year into a behavioural genetics programme at the Institute of Psychiatry to complete his Ph.D. under Pak Sham. He developed the PLINK genetics software during postdoctoral work with Mark Daly at the Whitehead Institute. He is also known for his research on the genetic bases of mental disorders such as schizophrenia and bipolar disorder, largely undertaken during faculty appointments at Massachusetts General Hospital and Mount Sinai in Manhattan.
