= Jan Mohr =

- Born: Jan Gunnar Faye Mohr; 10 January 1921; Paris
- Died: 17 March 2009 (aged 88)
- Education: Oslo University, Columbia University, University College London, Copenhagen University (M.D. 1954)
- Known for: Discovery of the first cases of autosomal genetic linkage
- Father: Hugo Lous Mohr
- Relatives: Otto Lous Mohr (uncle)
- Scientific career
- Fields: Medicine, genetics
- Institutions: University of Oslo, Copenhagen University
- Thesis: A Study of Linkage in Man

Jan Gunnar Faye Mohr (10 January 1921 – 17 March 2009) was a Norwegian-Danish physician and geneticist, known for his discovery of the first cases of autosomal genetic linkage in man, between the Lutheran blood groups and the ABH-secretor system, and between these and the hereditary disease myotonic dystrophy. Besides being first steps in mapping the human genome, the findings illustrated the medical potential of linkage analysis in prenatal genetic diagnosis. Mohr is eponymously known by the syndrome Mohr-Tranebjærg, a progressive deafness with X-linked mode of inheritance, which was first described by Jan Mohr, and then more comprehensively by Tranebjærg et al. The 'Mohr syndrome', or oral-facial-digital syndrome type II, is named after Otto Lous Mohr, uncle of Jan Mohr.

== Biography ==
Jan Mohr was born 1921 in Paris. His father was the Norwegian painter Hugo Lous Mohr. Jan Mohr graduated 1948 from medical school, Oslo University. Then, under the Rockefeller Foundation, studied genetics at Columbia University, University College London and the Institute of Medical Genetics, Copenhagen University. In 1954, Mohr was awarded a doctorate at Copenhagen University, and in 1968 became a member of the Royal Danish Academy of Sciences and Letters.

At the University of Oslo, he established and directed through the years 1954-1964 the Institute of Medical Genetics, along somewhat similar lines as the Copenhagen Institute. In 1964 he succeeded Tage Kemp in the Chair as Professor of Medical Genetics, Copenhagen University. Together with Hans Eiberg he established Copenhagen Family Bank in 1972, a store of DNA samples, comprising about 1000 large Danish families as a basis for a Resource Center for Linkage analysis, RC-LINK, to study also familial diseases such as cystic fibrosis and Batten disease, both of which are among diseases mapped at the center.

In 1968 Mohr introduced the concept of antenatal genetic diagnosis using sampled chorionic villi, and then together with N.Hahnemann developed the approach (for diagnosis early in pregnancy) towards clinical application.

Mohr founded and edited until his retirement the journal Clinical Genetics: An International Journal of Genetics in Medicine, as a sequel to the Opera series of the Copenhagen Institute, which had been discontinued. This was in cooperation with his two Nordic colleagues Kåre Berg in Oslo and Jan Arvid Bøøk in Uppsala.

In 1966 Mohr was elected founding chairman of European Society of Human Genetics, and managed the Society through following years. As Professor emeritus he pursued his genetic interests under the European Commission as a concerted action project leader within cancer genetics, with participation of research groups from most European countries.

== Bibliography ==
- Mohr, J. (1954) A Study of Linkage in Man. Munksgaards Forlag, Copenhagen.
- Mohr, J. (1982). Arvelighedslære 4 udg. Nyt Nordisk Forlag Arnold Busck, Copenhagen.
