= Shrawan Kumar (geneticist) =

Indian-American geneticist

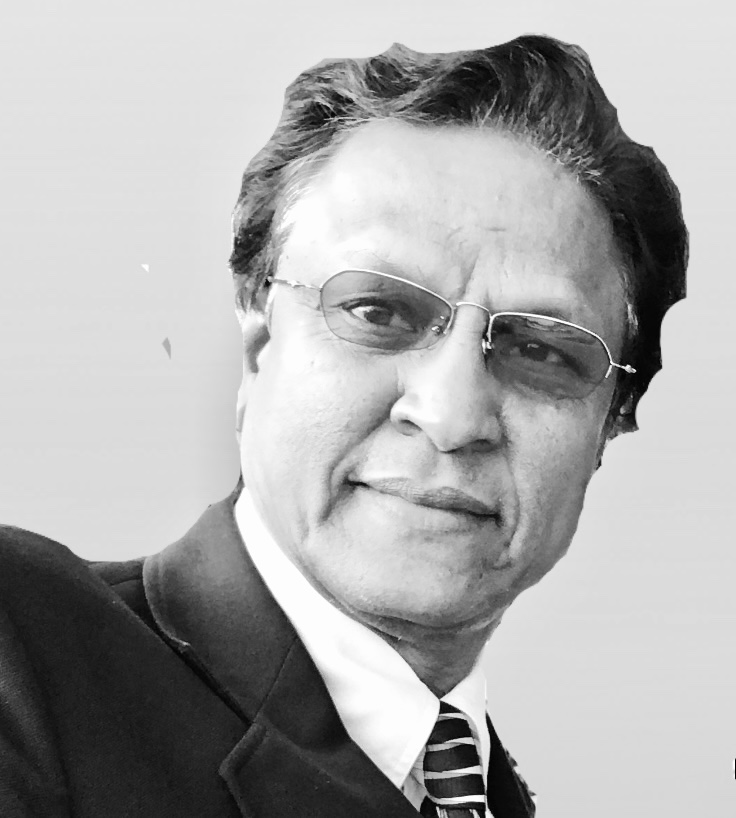
- Citizenship: USA
- Known for: Discovery of BOR and ADPKD2 Genes
- Scientific career
- Fields: Genetics
- Workplaces: Creighton University Medical Center; Boystown National Research Hospital; University of Nebraska Medical Center

Shrawan Kumar, also referred as Sam Kumar´, is an Indian-American geneticist, working in the fields of molecular and population genetics. He contributed to the discovery of two genes related to Branchio-oto-renal syndrome (BOR) and Autosomal Dominant Polycystic Kidney Disease (ADPKD2).

== Career ==
Following the completion of his M.S. and Ph.D. in India, Shrawan Kumar joined the University of Nebraska Medical Center as a Postdoctoral Fellow in Omaha, Nebraska, USA, in 1988. Subsequently, he contributed to genetic research at the Boys Town National Research Hospital, which is affiliated with Creighton University Medical Center, holding positions as Associate Professor and Staff Scientist where his research initiatives were related to the exploration of genes associated with hearing loss and kidney disorders. Later, he served as the principal investigator on a National Institutes of Health-funded research grant, which led to the discovery of two genes viz. Branchio-oto-renal syndrome (BOR) and Autosomal Dominant Polycystic Kidney Disease (ADPKD2). He was also involved in the discovery of an additional gene linked to branchio-otic (BO) type syndrome, located on chromosome 1q31. His contributions are documented in OMIM, (Online Mendelian Inheritance in Man), a comprehensive catalog of human gene discoveries and genetic disorders.

Kumar, whose efforts are also associated with the Native-American communities, serves at the Munroe Myer Institute at the University of Nebraska Medical Center. where he is involved in guiding students on career pathways associated with basic science and cancer education He also participates in various workshops and consortia related to the human genome project, notably in several International Workshops on Human Chromosome 8 Mapping.

== Publications ==
- Kemperman, M.H.; Stinckens, C.; Kumar, S.; Joosten, F.B.M.; Huygen, P.L.M.; Cremers, C.W.R.J. (2002), The Branchio-Oto-Renal Syndrome, Advances in Oto-Rhino-Laryngology, vol. 61, Basel: KARGER, pp. 192–200, doi:10.1159/000066809, ISBN 3-8055-7449-5, PMID 12408084
- Koch, Sacha M. P.; Kumar, Shrawan; Cremers, Cor W. R. J. (2000-05-01). "A Family With Autosomal Dominant Inherited Dysmorphic Small Auricles, Lip Pits, and Congenital Conductive Hearing Impairment". Archives of Otolaryngology–Head & Neck Surgery. 126 (5): 639–644. doi:10.1001/archotol.126.5.639. ISSN 0886-4470. PMID 10807332.
- Kumar, Shrawan (2003-10-17), "Branchio-oto-renal Syndrome", Genetic Hearing Loss, CRC Press, doi:10.1201/9780203913062.ch9 (inactive 3 April 2026), ISBN 978-0-8247-4309-3
- Kumar, Shrawan; Kimberling, William J.; Lanyi, Arpad; Sumegi, Janos; Pinnt, Jeff; Ing, Paul; Tinley, Sue; Marres, Henri A. M.; Cremers, Cor W. R. J. (1996-01-01). "Narrowing the Genetic Interval and Yeast Artificial Chromosome Map in the Branchio–Oto–Renal Region on Chromosome 8q". Genomics. 31 (1): 71–79. doi:10.1006/geno.1996.0011. hdl:2066/22560. ISSN 0888-7543. PMID 8808282.
- Kumar, Shrawan; Kimberling, William J.; Kenyon, Judy B.; Smith, Richard J. H.; Marres, Henri A. M.; Cremers, Cor W. R. J. (1992). "Autosomal dominant branchio-oto-renal syndrome—localization of a disease gene to chromosome 8q by linkage in a Dutch family". Human Molecular Genetics. 1 (7): 491–495. doi:10.1093/hmg/1.7.491. ISSN 0964-6906. PMID 1307249.
- KUMAR, SHRAWAN; DEFFENBACHER, KAREN; CREMERS, COR W. R. J.; VAN CAMP, GUY; KIMBERLING, WILLIAM J. (1997). "Branchio-Oto-Renal Syndrome: Identification of Novel Mutations, Molecular Characterization, Mutation Distribution, and Prospects for Genetic Testing". Genetic Testing. 1 (4): 243–251. doi:10.1089/gte.1997.1.243. ISSN 1090-6576. PMID 10464653.
- Kumar, Shrawan; Kimberling, William J.; Weston, Michael D.; Schaefer, Bradley G.; Berg, Mary Anne; Marres, Henri A. M.; Cremers, Cor W. R. J. (1998). "Identification of three novel mutations in human EYA1 protein associated with branchio-oto-renal syndrome". Human Mutation. 11 (6): 443–449. doi:10.1002/(sici)1098-1004(1998)11:6<443::aid-humu4>3.0.co;2-s. ISSN 1059-7794. PMID 9603436. S2CID 26027737.
- Usami, S.; Abe, Satoko; Shinkawa, Hideichi; Deffenbacher, Karen; Kumar, Shrawan; Kimberling, William J. (1999). "EYA1 nonsense mutation in a Japanese branchio-oto-renal syndrome family". Journal of Human Genetics. 44 (4): 261–265. doi:10.1007/s100380050156. ISSN 1434-5161. PMID 10429368. S2CID 31114290.
- Ruf, Rainer G.; Xu, Pin-Xian; Silvius, Derek; Otto, Edgar A.; Beekmann, Frank; Muerb, Ulla T.; Kumar, Shrawan; Neuhaus, Thomas J.; Kemper, Markus J.; Raymond, Richard M.; Brophy, Patrick D.; Berkman, Jennifer; Gattas, Michael; Hyland, Valentine; Ruf, Eva-Maria (2004-05-12). "SIX1 mutations cause branchio-oto-renal syndrome by disruption of EYA1–SIX1–DNA complexes". Proceedings of the National Academy of Sciences. 101 (21): 8090–8095. Bibcode:2004PNAS..101.8090R. doi:10.1073/pnas.0308475101. ISSN 0027-8424. PMC 419562. PMID 15141091.
- Fick, Godela M.; Johnson, Ann M.; Strain, John D.; Kimberling, William J.; Kumar, Shrawan; Manco-Johnson, Michael L.; Duley, Irene T.; Gabow, Patricia A. (1993). "Characteristics of very early onset autosomal dominant polycystic kidney disease". Pediatric Nephrology. 7 (6): 757. doi:10.1007/bf01213346. ISSN 0931-041X. S2CID 11017323.
- Kimberling, W J; Pieke-Dahl, S A; Kumar, S (1991-11-01). "The genetics of cystic diseases of the kidney". Seminars in Nephrology. 11 (6): 596–606. ISSN 1558-4488. PMID 1767134.
- Kumar, S; Kimberling, W J; Gabow, P A; Shugart, Y Y; Pieke-Dahl, S (1990-11-01). "Exclusion of autosomal dominant polycystic kidney disease type II (ADPKD2) from 160 cM of chromosome 1". Journal of Medical Genetics. 27 (11): 697–700. doi:10.1136/jmg.27.11.697. ISSN 1468-6244. PMC 1017261. PMID 1980516.
- Kumar, Shrawan; Kimberling, William J.; Gabow, Patricia A.; Kenyon, Judy B. (1991-06-01). "Genetic linkage studies of autosomal dominant polycystic kidney disease: search for the second gene in a large Sicilian family". Human Genetics. 87 (2): 129–133. doi:10.1007/BF00204167. ISSN 1432-1203. PMID 1676697.
- Kimberling, William J.; Kumar, Shrawan; Gabow, Patricia A.; Kenyon, Judith B.; Connolly, Christopher J.; Somlo, Stefan (1993). "Autosomal dominant polycystic kidney disease: Localization of the second gene to chromosome 4q13–q23". Genomics. 18 (3): 467–472. doi:10.1016/s0888-7543(11)80001-7. ISSN 0888-7543. PMID 8307555.
- Kumar, Shrawan; Marres, Henri A.M.; Cremers, Cor W.R.J.; Kimberling, William J. (1998-04-13). "Autosomal-dominant branchio-otic (BO) syndrome is not allelic to the branchio-oto-renal (BOR) Gene at 8q13". American Journal of Medical Genetics. 76 (5): 395–401. doi:10.1002/(sici)1096-8628(19980413)76:5<395::aid-ajmg6>3.0.co;2-m. ISSN 0148-7299. PMID 9556298.
- Kumar, Shrawan; Kimberling, William J.; Marres, Henri A.M.; Cremers, Cor W.R.J. (1999-03-19). "Genetic heterogeneity associated with branchio-oto-renal syndrome". American Journal of Medical Genetics. 83 (3): 207–208. doi:10.1002/(sici)1096-8628(19990319)83:3<207::aid-ajmg12>3.0.co;2-a. ISSN 0148-7299. PMID 10096598.

== See also ==
- Branchio-oto-renal syndrome
- Autosomal dominant polycystic kidney disease
- Polycystic Kidney Disease
