= David J. Begun =

American geneticist

- Born: Borough Park, Brooklyn, New York
- Education: Brandeis University, Arizona State University, Cornell University (PhD 1994)
- Known for: Population genetics, molecular evolution
- Awards: Dobzhansky Prize, Society for the Study of Evolution; Sandler Award, Genetics Society of America; Early Career Investigator Award, American Society of Naturalists
- Scientific career
- Fields: Genetics, evolutionary biology
- Institutions: University of Texas at Austin, University of California, Davis
- Doctoral advisor: Charles F. Aquadro
- Other academic advisors: Charles H. Langley

David J. Begun is an American geneticist and evolutionary biologist best known for his work on the molecular population genetics of Drosophila. He is a Distinguished Professor in the Department of Evolution and Ecology at the University of California, Davis.

== Early life and education ==
David Begun was born in Borough Park, Brooklyn and was raised in Sheepshead Bay, Brooklyn. He attended Stuyvesant High School. Begun received a Bachelor of Arts in Biology from Brandeis University in 1985. He obtained a Master of Science in Zoology from Arizona State University in 1989. He earned his Ph.D. in Genetics and Development from Cornell University in 1994. His PhD advisor was Charles F. Aquadro. Following his doctorate, he did post-doctoral work with Charles H. Langley.

== Academic career ==
Begun joined the faculty at the University of Texas at Austin in 1996 and moved to the University of California, Davis in 2000, where he currently serves as Distinguished Professor of Evolution and Ecology. He is affiliated with the Center for Population Biology, the Integrative Genetics & Genomics Graduate Group, and the Population Biology Graduate Group.

== Research ==
Begun's research focuses on population genetics and molecular evolution, particularly using Drosophila species as model organisms. His lab integrates classical genetic approaches with genomics and transcriptomics to study how variation is distributed across genomes within and between species. Major contributions include:

- Demonstrating that levels of naturally occurring DNA polymorphism in Drosophila melanogaster correlate with local recombination rate.
- Whole-genome analyses of polymorphism and divergence in Drosophila simulans.
- Investigations into the genetic architecture of reproductive traits, sexual selection, adaptation, and more recently de novo gene origin and copy-number variation.

== Selected publications ==
- Begun, David J.; Aquadro, Charles F. (1992). "Levels of naturally occurring DNA polymorphism correlate with recombination rates in D. melanogaster". Nature. 356 (6369): 519–520. Bibcode:1992Natur.356..519B. doi:10.1038/356519a0. PMID 1560824.
- Begun, David J.; Holloway, Alison K.; Stevens, Kathleen; Hillier, L. David (2007). "Population Genomics: Whole-Genome Analysis of Polymorphism and Divergence in Drosophila simulans". PLOS Biology. 5 (11) e310. doi:10.1371/journal.pbio.0050310. PMC 2062478. PMID 17988176.
- Zhao, L.; Begun, David J. (2017). "Genomics of parallel adaptation at two timescales in Drosophila". PLOS Genetics. 13 (10) e1007016. doi:10.1371/journal.pgen.1007016. PMC 5638604. PMID 28968391.
- Cridland, Julie M.; Contino, Colin E.; Begun, David J. (2023). "Selection and geography shape male reproductive tract transcriptomes in Drosophila melanogaster". Genetics. 224 (1) iyad034. doi:10.1093/genetics/iyad034. PMID 36869688.

== Awards and recognition ==
Begun was awarded the Dobzhansky Prize from the Society for the Study of Evolution, the Sandler Award from the Genetics Society of America, and the Early Career Investigator Award from the American Society of Naturalists, all in 1995. He is currently a Distinguished Professor at UC Davis.
