= Timothy Schedl =

American geneticist

Timothy Schedl (born 1955 in Iowa City, Iowa) is a professor of genetics at Washington University School of Medicine.

== Education ==
Timothy Bruce Schedl was born in 1955 to University of Iowa chemistry professor Harold Schedl and professor of art Naomi Schedl. He has two brothers, Andrew Schedl and Paul Schedl. He received his degree from Lawrence University in 1977.

== Career ==
In 1990, he moved to St. Louis where he occupied the same position that he does now. The Schedl lab studies germline development of the soil nematode C. elegans, and uses genetic, molecular, and cellular approaches to investigate germcell proliferation and entry into meiosis, progression through meiotic prophase, meiotic maturation and ovulation, and germline sex determination.
