= Margaret W. Thompson =

Canadian geneticist

Margaret (Peggy) Anne Wilson Thompson
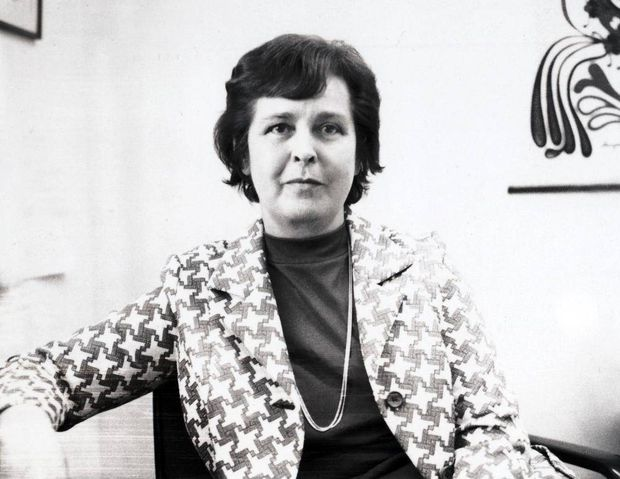
- Thompson while working at the University of Toronto
- Born: 7 January 1920; Isle of Man, UK
- Died: 3 November 2014 (aged 94); Toronto, CA
- Occupation: Geneticist

Margaret Anne Wilson Thompson C.M. Ph.D. LL.D B.A., (7 January 1920 – 3 November 2014) was a prominent researcher in the field of genetics in Canada. She was a member of the Alberta Eugenics Board from 1960 to 1963, before joining the University of Toronto and the Hospital for Sick Children in Toronto to complete research on genetics and pediatrics. Thompson's work earned her the Order of Canada in 1988, although her appointment remains controversial due to her role in the eugenics movement. Thompson testified about her involvement in the Eugenics Board during the Muir v. Alberta case in 1996 and was also interviewed in a documentary about the lawsuit.

== Early life and education ==
Margaret Anne Wilson Thompson, also known as "Peggy", was born on 7 January 1920 on the Isle of Man in the United Kingdom. At six years of age, she emigrated with her family to Saskatchewan, Canada. Thompson received teacher training at the Saskatoon Teacher's College and worked at rural schools in Saskatchewan for two years. Thompson graduated from the University of Saskatchewan in 1943 with an undergraduate degree in Biology, focusing specifically on genetics. She lived in the prairies until the early 1950s, when Thompson moved to Alberta with her husband, James "Jimmy" Scott Thompson. She later went on to complete a PhD in Zoology, specializing in metabolic genetics, at the University of Toronto in 1948 under the guidance of pioneering human geneticist Norma Ford Walker.

== Career ==
=== Early career ===
After completing her PhD, Thompson took on a teaching position at the University of Western Ontario for two years and subsequently taught Zoology at the University of Alberta in Edmonton. In 1956 Thompson was appointed as the director of a newly founded Genetic Counseling Service at the University of Alberta's Faculty of Medicine. She became an assistant professor of Pediatrics & Genetics at the University of Alberta in 1959.

=== Alberta Eugenics Board ===
Thompson was involved in the Canadian eugenics movement beginning in the 1960s. Alberta was one of only two Canadian provinces to legislate eugenic policies (alongside British Columbia) when the Sexual Sterilization Act was passed in 1928, which created the Alberta Eugenics Board to oversee the sterilization campaign.

The Alberta Eugenics Board consisted of four members at any given time and was in charge of reviewing individual patients’ cases to determine if sterilization was appropriate. Margaret Thompson was a member of the Board from 1960 until 1963, one of only 21 members to serve on the Board in its 43 years of existence and the first member with a substantial background in genetics. Thompson approached all cases that came before the Board with two considerations in mind: "Would they make good parents and would they transmit their biological defects?"

=== Genetics Advocacy ===
==== Canadian Genetics ====
Margaret Thompson was an academic and was featured in multiple Globe and Mail and Toronto Star articles on her research in genetic defects and age, detecting birth defects through genetic testing, incest and her genetic advocacy in Canada and abroad.

These articles often discuss family planning approaches including the use of contraceptive pills for older patients to decrease the number of children born with defects. These articles use economic as well as genetic arguments for decreasing the number of children born with defects, stating that it is for the economic benefit of the population for children with birth defects not to be born. In the 1950s and 1960s there was a transition to more ‘positive’ eugenic measures where the focus shifted from limiting procreation to promoting marriages and family stability within the white middle class, which is reflected in the emphasis on family planning seen in Dr. Thompson's research.

As genetic testing was made available, Thompson advocated for the accessibility of these tests for families expecting children. Thompson stated that her motivation for wider testing was a fear that all the ‘defective children [would] survive, [and] their numbers [would] grow by at least the same number annually’ without testing. Thompson and other geneticists in Canada were advocating for more comprehensive genetic services and a wider application of medical genetics, which led to the formation of the Canadian College of Medical Genetics in 1976. An additional benefit of this college, it was argued, would be the nationalization and standardization of accreditation for individual geneticists and their guidelines.

==== Global Genetics ====
While Canadian geneticists were looking to nationalize genetic health care, genetics was also part of a global conversation. In 1976 at a genetic conference in Dublin, Ireland, Thompson warned doctors of the risks associated with genetic engineering: "man can stop making atom bombs if he wants to but a biological monster once created goes on reproducing itself. Humanity might find itself in a sorcerer's apprentice situation." At this time, genetic engineering using human DNA and the bacterial DNA of E Coli was considered a ‘medical breakthrough’. The majority of this research took place in North America, in the United States.

=== SickKids Hospital and University of Toronto ===
In 1963, Thompson joined both the University of Toronto and the Hospital for Sick Children in Toronto, commonly known as SickKids. While at SickKids and the University of Toronto, Thompson continued her research in genetics and also worked in the pediatrics department. One of her areas of research was early detection of Down syndrome. Thompson wrote numerous scientific articles during this time, and also published the first textbook of human genetics specifically written for medical students in 1966 alongside her husband, who was a professor of anatomy. Entitled Genetics in Medicine, the publication became the standard textbook on genetics used throughout North America. The 8th revised edition of the textbook was published in 2016. Thompson also served as President of the Canadian College of Medical Geneticists from 1983 to 1984. She retired from SickKids Hospital in 1988.

=== Leilani Muir Case ===
Due to her time spent on the Alberta Eugenics Board, Thompson served as an expert witness in the first wrongful sterilization case in Canada; Muir v. Alberta (1996). The case concerned the wrongful diagnosis and subsequent involuntary sterilization, under the guise of an appendectomy, of then-14 year old Leilani Muir in 1957, who was diagnosed as a ‘moron’.

The court found that Dr. Thompson's testimony established that the board's decisions were not made in accordance with ‘scientific principles or legislative standard’ instead they were in support of ‘social policy’ regarding who should be allowed to have children. Thompson also testified that the Eugenics Board ignored the changes made by the legislature, in her opinion, the standard that was set was ‘unreasonably tough’ and was ‘too high to meet. Thompson claimed in her testimony that sterilizations were only completed with parental consent; however, a comprehensive review of cases that went before the Board demonstrated that less than half of cases ‘passed’ for sterilization occurred with consent from a patient or their guardian (42% of cases involving men, 39% for women). Thompson's testimony affirmed that eugenic practices were not purely scientific, instead that the eugenics movement was a social and political one. Thompson's testimony was found by the courts to suggest that while the Board operated with scientific rationale, the practices and their motivation were unscientific in nature. Additionally, the court noted that the board acted outside of legislation and instead acted upon the opinions of board members that controlling the reproduction of ‘these people’ was socially preferable.

Thompson was also interviewed for the 1996 documentary film ‘The Sterilization of Leilani Muir’. In her interview, Thompson justified the practices of the Eugenics Board as appropriate for the time.

"Individual cases that come to public attention are really just presentations of one side of the picture. We don't know how the individuals concerned might have got along if sterilization had not occurred and if they had entered into fertile marriages and had a number of children."

==== Eugenic Practices ====
By the time the Sexual Sterilization Act was repealed in 1972, over 2,800 people had been sterilized under the auspices of the eugenics program. Much of the ideology of sterilization was rooted in widespread racist and sexist attitudes, which are reflected in the demographics of people subjected to compulsory sterilization. Vulnerable groups (particularly orphaned and disabled children; and Métis and First Nations people, women especially) were most disproportionately targeted by the program. Thompson's testimony in Muir v. Alberta also brought to light other common practices of the board including the removal of ovaries of those persons who masturbated or displayed ‘lesbian tendencies’, this was done in an effort to curb sexual activity within the facility. Additionally, male persons with down syndrome, known to be infertile, were castrated and their testicular tissues used for research purposes. In response to this practice, Thompson was under the impression that everyone would agree in her approach to "make assurance doubly sure" that they would not reproduce.

== Legacy ==
Thompson was a founding member of the Genetics Society of Canada. In 1988, Thompson was awarded the Order of Canada for her work in genetics and genetics counselling. In 2010, Edmonton resident Rob Wells filed a petition with the Governor General of Canada to have Thompson's Order revoked, which was denied. Thompson was honoured by her alma mater, the University of Saskatchewan on 31 May 2001 with an honorary Doctor of Laws. No mention of her position on the eugenics board was made in any of the official transcripts from her awards and honorary doctorate. Thompson died in Toronto on 3 November 2014 at the age of 94.

== Notable publications ==
- Heredity, Maternal Age, and Birth Order in the Etiology of Celiac Disease. (1951). American Journal of Human Genetics 3 (2): 159–166.
- A New Heredity Counseling Service in Western Canada. (1959). Eugenics Quarterly 6, no. 3: 167–70. https://doi.org/10.1080/19485565.1959.9987410.
- Reproduction in Two Female Mongols. (1961). Canadian Journal of Genetics and Cytology 3 (4): 351–354.
- 21-Trisomy in a Fertile Female Mongol. (1962). Canadian Journal of Genetics and Cytology 4 (3): 352–355.
- Genetic Implications of Heteropycnosis of the X Chromosome. (1965). Canadian Journal of Genetics and Cytology 7 (2): 202–213.
- Genetics in Medicine. (1966). Philadelphia: Saunders. Co-written with Thompson, James Scott.
- Genetic Counseling in Clinical Pediatrics: What to do with Inquiries about Heritable Disorders. (1967). Clinical Review Vol. 6. Thousand Oaks, CA: Sage Publications.
- Methodology in Human Genetics. (1968). Canadian Journal of Genetics and Cytology 10 (3): 747-753.
- Incest. (1976). The Globe and Mail (1936-Current), 6.
- Unfair Attack. (1991). The Globe and Mail (1936-Current), D7.
- Genethics: Technological Intervention in Human Reproduction as a Philosophical Problem. (1996). American Journal of Medical Genetics 66 (3): 369-369.
- The History of a Genetic Disease: Duchenne Muscular Dystrophy Or Meryon's Disease. (1996). Trends in Genetics 12 (3): 119.

== See also ==
- Norma Ford Walker
- Hospital for Sick Children (Toronto)
- Compulsory Sterilization in Canada
- Alberta Eugenics Board
- Medical Genetics
- Leilani Muir
- The Sterilization of Leilani Muir (film)
- Order of Canada
