= Charles H. Langley =

American geneticist and evolutionary biologist

- Other names: "Chuck"
- Education: University of Texas at Austin; University of Wisconsin–Madison
- Awards: Genetics Society of America Medal (1999)
- Scientific career
- Fields: Evolutionary biology
- Institutions: National Institute of Environmental Health Sciences (NIEHS); University of California, Davis
- Notable students: Manyuan Long; David J. Begun

Charles H. Langley is an American geneticist and evolutionary biologist who is currently a Distinguished Professor of Genetics at the University of California, Davis. His work focuses on the evolutionary forces shaping genetic variation, including mutation, recombination, natural selection, and linkage effects. He is known for integrating theoretical, computational, and empirical approaches in population genetics and genomics.

== Early life and education ==
Langley earned his Ph.D. from the University of Texas at Austin in 1971, and subsequently conducted postdoctoral research at the University of Wisconsin–Madison.

== Career ==
Langley began his career at the National Institute of Environmental Health Sciences (NIEHS) in Research Triangle Park, North Carolina, before joining the University of California, Davis in 1989.

At UC Davis, Langley's research has centered on evolutionary genetics and population genomics, with particular emphasis on the structure of genetic variation in natural populations of Drosophila. He contributed to the development of approaches to infer recombination rates, detect selection, and interpret genome-wide variation. Langley was among the first to propose and document the existence of centromere-spanning haplotypes (cenhaps) in both humans and Drosophila.

== Awards and honors ==
- Genetics Society of America Medal (1999)
- Elected Fellow of the American Academy of Arts and Sciences (2007)

== Mentorship and influence ==
Langley has mentored numerous students and postdoctoral researchers in evolutionary genetics. Among his notable mentees are Manyuan Long, known for research on the origin and evolution of new genes, and Martin Kreitman and David J. Begun, prominent population geneticists.

== Selected research areas ==
- Evolutionary and population genetics
- Recombination and linkage disequilibrium
- Genomic variation in Drosophila and humans
- Statistical and computational methods in evolutionary inference
