= Paul Schedl =

- Born: November 7, 1947 (age 77); Iowa City, Iowa
- Education: Stanford University (PhD 1975)
- Known for: Control of gene expression in developmental systems
- Parents: Harold Schedl (father); Naomi Schedl (mother)
- Relatives: Andrew Schedl, Timothy Schedl (brothers)
- Scientific career
- Fields: Molecular biology, genetics
- Institutions: University of Basel, Switzerland (Helen Hay Whitney fellow); Princeton University
- Academic advisors: Walter Gehring

Paul Daniel Schedl (born November 7, 1947, in Iowa City, Iowa) is a Professor of Molecular Biology at Princeton University.

Schedl has made significant contributions to the field of the control of gene expression in developmental systems using the model system Drosophila melanogaster. On the genomic level, his lab has uncovered the mechanisms of chromatin regulation by the Polycomb and trithorax group genes. At the transcriptional and post-transcriptional level, he made discoveries in the regulation of alternative splicing of the sex determination gene, Sxl. At the level of translational control, he discovered the function of the orb and orb2 gene in early development.

Schedl obtained his PhD in 1975 at Stanford University, and was a Helen Hay Whitney postdoctoral fellow in Walter Gehring's lab at the University of Basel, Switzerland. Schedl has been a member of the faculty at Princeton University since 1978.

As of 2006, Schedl has published 132 papers, mentored 28 graduate students, sponsored 25 postdoctoral fellows and collaborated with 79 scientists.

Schedl was born to Harold Schedl, a professor of chemistry at the University of Iowa, and Naomi Schedl, a professor of art. He has two brothers, Andrew Schedl and Timothy Schedl.
