= Peter Propping =

German geneticist (1942–2016)

- Born: 1 December 1942; Berlin, Germany
- Died: 26 April 2016 (aged 73)
- Education: Free University of Berlin (M.D. 1970)
- Known for: Alcoholism, manic depressive disorders, schizophrenia, epilepsy, and hereditary cancer predispositions
- Awards: Mendel-Medal of the Leopoldina, German Cancer Aid Award
- Scientific career
- Fields: Genetics
- Workplaces: University of Heidelberg, German Research Council, University of Bonn

Peter Propping (21 December 1942 – 26 April 2016) was a German human geneticist.

The scientific work of Propping spans genetically complex diseases, especially affecting brain function such as alcoholism, manic depressive disorders, schizophrenia, epilepsy, and in addition hereditary cancer predispositions. He also studied the history of human genetics and eugenics. From 1984 to 2008 he was director of the Institute of Human Genetics of the University of Bonn.

== Biography ==
Propping studied medicine at the Free University of Berlin from 1962 to 1968, receiving his MD degree in 1970 based on experimental work in pharmacology. After having received his license to practise medicine, he became a research assistant at the Institute of Anthropology and Human Genetics of the University of Heidelberg. From 1980 to 1983, Propping was a Heisenberg fellow for psychiatric genetics of the German Research Council. During this time he worked both at the Central Institute of Mental Health in Mannheim and at the Institute of Anthropology and Human Genetics of the University of Heidelberg. From 1984 to 2008, Propping was a full professor of human genetics and director of the Institute of Human Genetics of the University of Bonn. He was dean of the faculty of medicine from 1990 to 1992, and vice rector for research of the University of Bonn from 1994 to 1996. In 1995 he received the newly introduced recognition as a specialist in human genetics by the German Medical Association. From 1991 to 1997 he coordinated the research programme on "Genetic factors in psychiatric disorders" of the German Research Council, and from 1996 to 2004 he was speaker of the graduate college "Pathogenesis of disorders of the central nervous system". From 1999 to 2012 Propping coordinated the German HNPCC consortium supported by the German Cancer Aid. From 2006 to 2008 he chaired the German Society of Human Genetics. After becoming an emeritus in 2008, he was named senior professor by the rector of the University of Bonn.

== Scientific contributions ==
Propping showed that the intra-animal culture of bacteria (host-mediated assay) designed to induce mutations by chemical agents reflects the metabolism of the host. He also compiled findings reported in the literature that point to the genetic influence on drug effects on brain function. In a large twin study and in carriers of the normal electroencephalogram (EEG) he showed that the effect of ethanol on the EEG is strongly influenced by genetic factors. In addition, the metabolism of alcohol is under genetic control. In Bonn, Propping initiated a long-term study in order to analyse the genetic contribution to manic depression. In contrast to the expectation that was widespread among researchers it was not possible to pin down genetic factors through the linkage approach. In rare forms of epilepsy, however, mutated genes could be uncovered through positional cloning. Propping was also involved in large international studies that made use of the method of genome-wide association analysis (GWAS). It turned out that there exists a genetic overlap between various mental disorders. In familial adenomatous polyposis Propping and his research group could refine the genotype-phenotype-relationship. In the most frequent form of inherited colorectal cancer (HNPCC, Lynch syndrome) Propping's group could define several relationships between genotype and phenotype that play a role for genetic transmission, diagnostics, prognosis, and cancer prevention.

== Honors and awards ==
Propping received the following awards for his merits in medical genetics :

- 2003 – Mendel-Medal of the Leopoldina
- 2004 – Honorary professor of the University of Nanjing
- 2004 – Johann-Georg-Zimmermann-Medal
- 2004 – Lifetime Achievement Award of the International Society of Psychiatric Genetics
- 2005 – Emil Kraepelin Professor for Psychiatry at the Max Planck Institute of Psychiatry
- 2010 – German Cancer Aid Award
- 2011 – Karl-Heinrich-Bauer-Medal
- 2014 – Felix Burda Award as member of the German HNPCC-Konsortium
- 2014 – Medal of honour of the German Society of Human Genetics

== Memberships ==
In 1997 he was a member of the Advisory Board of the German Cancer Aid and became chairman in 2003. From 1999 to 2007 he was a member of the board of directors of the German Reference Center on Ethics in the Biosciences at the University of Bonn, and from 2001 to 2007 a member in the project team of the National German Genome Research Network (NGFN) of the Federal Ministry of Education and Research (BMBF). From 2001 to 2007 he was a member of the National Ethics Council, established by the German government. In 2001 Propping was admitted to the Academy of Sciences Leopoldina and became a member of the Senate in 2008. From 2010 he was a presidium member of the Academy of Sciences Leopoldina. From 2008 to 2012 he was a member of the University Council to the University of Bonn.

== Books ==
- F. Vogel, P. Propping: Ist unser Schicksal mitgeboren? Berlin 1981
- P. Propping: Psychiatrische Genetik. Befunde und Konzepte. Berlin / Heidelberg / New York 1989
- P. Propping, H. Schott (Hrsg.): Wissenschaft auf Irrwegen. Biologismus-Rassenhygiene-Eugenik. Bonn/Berlin 1992
- T.. J. Bouchard, P. Propping (Hrsg): Twins as aTool of Behavioral Genetics. Chichester./. New York ./. Brisbane ./. Toronto ./. Singapore ./. 1993
- L. Honnefelder, P. Propping (Hrsg.): Was wissen wir, wenn wir das menschliche Genom kennen? Köln 2001
- L. Honnefelder, D. Mieth, P. Propping (Hrsg.): Das genetische Wissen und die Zukunft des Menschen. Berlin 2003
