= Pak Sham =

Psychiatric geneticist

Pak Chung Sham
- 沈伯松
- Education: University of Cambridge, University of Oxford, Birkbeck, University of London
- Scientific career
- Fields: Psychiatric genetics
- Institutions: University of Hong Kong
- Doctoral students: Shaun Purcell

Pak Chung Sham is a psychiatric geneticist. He holds the Suen Chi-Sun Professorship in Clinical Science at the University of Hong Kong, where he is also the Chair Professor in Psychiatric Genomics, Director of the Centre for Genomic Sciences, and Director of Academic Developments in the Department of Psychiatry. He was a Professor of Psychiatric and Statistical Genetics at the Institute of Psychiatry, Psychology and Neuroscience from 2000 to 2006. He first joined the faculty of the University of Hong Kong as a visiting professor in 2004, where he became Chair Professor in Psychiatric Genomics in 2006. He is the editor-in-chief of the peer-reviewed journal Human Heredity.
