= Wojciech Karlowski =

Polish biologist specializing in molecular biology and bioinformatics

- Wojciech Karłowski
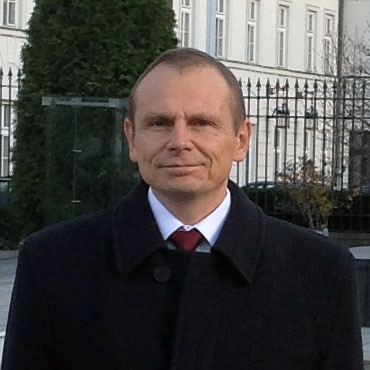
- Born: January 10, 1966 (age 60); Poznań, Poland
- Education: Adam Mickiewicz University
- Known for: high-throughput analyses and functional annotation of biological sequences, identification of non-coding RNAs
- Scientific career
- Fields: bioinformatics, computational biology, molecular biology, molecular genetics, genomics
- Workplaces: Adam Mickiewicz University in Poland, University of California Los Angeles / USA, Institute of Bioinformatics (MIPS) in Munich / Germany
- Thesis: Genes encoding nodule-specific proline-rich proteins from yellow lupine (1996)
- Doctoral advisor: Andrzej B. Legocki
- Website: http://combio.pl/

Wojciech Maciej Karlowski (Polish pronunciation: [vɔj.t͡ɕɛx karlɔvski]; born January 10, 1966) is a Polish biologist specializing in molecular biology and bioinformatics, and a full professor in biological sciences. He is Head of the Department of Computational Biology at the Faculty of Biology at the Adam Mickiewicz University in Poznan. His major scientific interests include identification of non-coding RNAs, genomics, high-throughput analyses, and functional annotation of biological sequences.

== Scientific biography ==
Karlowski graduated in molecular biology from the Faculty of Biology at the Adam Mickiewicz University in Poznan in 1991.

From 1991 to 1996 Karlowski continued his education in the area of plant molecular genetics in the frame of the Adam Mickiewicz University Ph.D. School. His research concentrated on molecular mechanisms of symbiotic nitrogen fixation of leguminous plants. He defended his Ph.D. dissertation “Genes encoding nodule-specific proline-rich proteins from yellow lupine” in 1996 under the supervision of Andrzej B. Legocki.

Karłowski completed his postdoctoral fellowship in the laboratory of Ann Hirsch in the Institute of Molecular, Cell and Developmental Biology at the University of California in Los Angeles (UCLA). He was conducting experiments related to molecular aspects of symbiotic interactions between leguminous plants and bacteria, including characterization of a novel gene identified in alfalfa (Medicago sativa) mutant blocked at the early stages of symbiotic nodules development.

In the early 2000s, Karlowski worked as a Scientist in the group of Klaus F. X. Mayer in the Institute of Bioinformatics/Munich Information Center for Protein Sequences (MIPS) in Munich. He was involved in research on computational genomics of plants in a collaboration with Arizona Genomics Institute, Whitehead Institute MIT, and Rutgers University. One of his scientific achievements during that time was related to a bioinformatic analysis of data generated during the early stages of corn (Zea mays) genome sequencing. A novel approach and application of advanced computational biology techniques to the project allowed the first view at the composition and evolutionary history of the corn genome.

Karlowski then took a position at the Faculty of Biology at the Adam Mickiewicz University in Poznan and also completed an internship at the University in Perpignan in France. At this time, he started a scientific project dedicated to a bioinformatic analysis of protein domains involved in silencing of transcription in a collaboration with Thierry Lagrange. In 2008 Wojciech Karlowski was appointed as a visiting professor at the University of Perpignan and collaborated with Manuel Echeverria on the functional characterization of miRNA in rice. In the same year, the Faculty of Biology Council awarded him with the habilitation degree (D. Sc) in biology. Karlowski was nominated as an associate professor in the Laboratory of Bioinformatics at the Adam Mickiewicz University and he established his research group that worked on projects related to genomics, biological data analysis, and non-coding RNAs.

In 2014 Karlowski received a nomination of a professor in biological sciences from the President of the Republic of Poland. In the same year, he took the position of professor at the Faculty of Biology at the Adam Mickiewicz University in Poznan and established the Department of Computational Biology. His research group works on scientific projects related to the exploration of biological data. They investigate the properties of biological processes using computational tools and employ high-throughput methods for comparative, functional, and evolutionary molecular biology analyses.

== Scientific achievements ==
Karlowski is an expert in bioinformatics, molecular biology, molecular genetics, and genomics. He is an author and co-author of numerous publications in international journals. Among some of his achievements are:

- Zielezinski, Andrzej; Girgis, Hani Z.; Bernard, Guillaume; Leimeister, Chris-Andre; Tang, Kujin; Dencker, Thomas; Lau, Anna Katharina; Röhling, Sophie; Choi, Jae Jin; Waterman, Michael S.; Comin, Matteo; Kim, Sung-Hou; Vinga, Susana; Almeida, Jonas S.; Chan, Cheong Xin; James, Benjamin T.; Sun, Fengzhu; Morgenstern, Burkhard; Karlowski, Wojciech M. (December 2019). "Benchmarking of alignment-free sequence comparison methods". Genome Biology. 20 (1): 144. doi:10.1186/s13059-019-1755-7. PMC 6659240. PMID 31345254.
- Zielezinski, Andrzej; Karlowski, Wojciech M. (1 February 2015). "Integrative data analysis indicates an intrinsic disordered domain character of Argonaute-binding motifs". Bioinformatics. 31 (3): 332–339. doi:10.1093/bioinformatics/btu666. PMID 25304778.
- Karlowski, Wojciech M.; Zielezinski, Andrzej; Carrère, Julie; Pontier, Dominique; Lagrange, Thierry; Cooke, Richard (July 2010). "Genome-wide computational identification of WG/GW Argonaute-binding proteins in Arabidopsis". Nucleic Acids Research. 38 (13): 4231–4245. doi:10.1093/nar/gkq162. PMC 2910046. PMID 20338883.
- Messing, Joachim; Bharti, Arvind K.; Karlowski, Wojciech M.; Gundlach, Heidrun; Kim, Hye Ran; Yu, Yeisoo; Wei, Fusheng; Fuks, Galina; Soderlund, Carol A.; Mayer, Klaus F. X.; Wing, Rod A. (5 October 2004). "Sequence composition and genome organization of maize". Proceedings of the National Academy of Sciences. 101 (40): 14349–14354. Bibcode:2004PNAS..10114349M. doi:10.1073/pnas.0406163101. PMC 521949. PMID 15388850.
- Shiu, Shin-Han; Karlowski, Wojciech M.; Pan, Runsun; Tzeng, Yun-Huei; Mayer, Klaus F. X.; Li, Wen-Hsiung (12 May 2004). "Comparative Analysis of the Receptor-Like Kinase Family in Arabidopsis and Rice[W]". The Plant Cell. 16 (5): 1220–1234. Bibcode:2004PlanC..16.1220S. doi:10.1105/tpc.020834. PMC 423211. PMID 15105442.
- Karlowski, Wojciech M. (2003). "The over-expression of an alfalfa RING-H2 gene induces pleiotropic effects on plant growth and development". Plant Molecular Biology. 52 (1): 121–133. Bibcode:2003PMolB..52..121K. doi:10.1023/a:1023916701669. PMID 12825694. S2CID 13732663.
