= Emmy Stein =

German geneticist and botanist (1879–1954)

- Born: 21 June 1879; Düsseldorf, Germany
- Died: 21 September 1954 (aged 75); Tübingen, Germany
- Education: Marienfield Horticultural School for Women, near Berlin; Zürich, Switzerland; University of Jena (PhD 1913)
- Known for: Studying effects of radiation on plants
- Scientific career
- Fields: Botany, genetics
- Institutions: University of Berlin; Kaiser Wilhelm Institute; Max Planck Institute of Biology, Tübingen
- Academic advisors: Erwin Baur, Fritz von Wettstein, Max Hartmann

Emmy Stein (1879–1954) was a German botanist and geneticist noted for being one of the first scientists to study the effect of radium on plants.

== General biography ==
Emmy Stein was born on 21 June 1879 in Düsseldorf, Germany. From a young age, she was thought to have a natural affinity for science. She also demonstrated the drive needed at the time to overcome the limited accessibility to universities for women, as well as the social resistance to women entering academic fields.

Growing up in a well-off industrial family, Stein had a lot of support to continue her education. At 25, she decided to attend the Marienfield Horticultural School for Women near Berlin. For the next two years, Stein was given thorough training on the maintenance and care of common agricultural crops. She then began studying botany in Zürich, Switzerland, where she completed her matriculation exams. Between 1906 and 1907 Stein completed research in the Dutch East Indies, then moved to Jena, Germany to continue her studies. In 1913, Stein graduated with a PhD in morphological botany from the University of Jena.

Soon after graduating, Stein volunteered to work with the Red Cross during World War I. After a couple of years of service, she moved to Berlin in search of a position within the newly founded Department of Genetics in the University of Berlin. Initially, Stein had inquired about a position similar to the one that her closest friend, Luise Von Gravenitz, had acquired as an assistant to Erwin Baur. In 1919 Stein joined Baur's research group, first as a voluntary assistant, and then as a full assistant to Baur in 1923. She died in Tübingen on 21 September 1954.

== Research ==
Stein began genetic research under the direction of Erwin Baur, where she investigated the formation of hereditary carcinoma by radium in snapdragon (Antirrhinum). This work made her one of the first biologists to examine the effects of radium on plants. Stein presented her experimental results at the very first meeting of the German Genetics Society, in 1921. Her experiments at the time may have suggested that X-rays were mutagenic. However, by 1926 Stein had assumed that the radiomorphoses and other radiation-dependent modifications that she'd discovered were not caused by mutations, but rather by an expression of plasma-dependent permanent modifications. A year later, Hermann J. Muller presented his discovery of controlled X-ray-induced mutations in Drosophila at the International Genetics Congress. Inspired by this, Stein started to examine somatically induced hereditary plant tissue proliferations, leading to her introduction of the concept of phytocarcinoma in 1930 (Stein, 1930). This work correctly attributes the effects of X-ray induced mutagenesis to changes in the cell nucleus.

In 1940 Emmy Stein moved to the Kaiser Wilhelm Institute (KWI) for Biology, located in Berlin-Dahlem. Here she investigated hormonal influences on plant stem and root tissue throughout grafting experiments, under the direction of Fritz von Wettstein. Through this, she was not only able to provide evidence of hormonal influence on plant growth, but also managed to separate the actions of mutations into two components: chlorophyll deficiency and dwarfism.

During World War II, the KWI for Biology was relocated to Hechingen, Germany, and renamed the Max Planck Institute. In 1948, the institute was relocated to Tübingen, Germany. Throughout all of this, Stein continued research with von Wettstein until his death in 1945. She then transferred to Max Hartmann's department where she actively pursued research until her last days.

== Personal life ==
Emmy Stein had a close friendship with her colleague/coworker, Luise Von Graevenitz, whom she met during her time at The Marienfield Horticultural Institute for Women. As both Stein and Van Graevenitz aspired to be botanical researchers, they quickly become close friends. While at the Berlin Department of Genetics, she lived and worked together with Von Graevenitz. The early death of Von Graevenitz in 1920 heavily impacted Stein. In memory of her friend, Stein became a member of the Union for the Protection of Children against Abuse and Molestation.

Elizabeth Schiemann, a colleague during Stein's time at the Max Planck Institute, said that Stein was “a motherly person beyond all her talents and concentration on scientific work” (Deichmann, 2018). Schiemann also mentioned how she admired Stein's active relationship with her siblings and their children.
