= Hans Eiberg =

Danish geneticist

- Born: 8 April 1945 (age 80)
- Known for: Discovery of the mutation causing blue eyes
- Scientific career
- Fields: Genetics
- Institutions: Copenhagen University

Hans Eiberg (born 8 April 1945) is a Danish geneticist, known for his discovery of the genetic mutation causing blue eyes.

Hans Eiberg graduated as a M.Sc. in 1970. He has worked with genetics at the Institute for Medical Biochemistry and Genetics of Copenhagen University since 1971, and became an associate professor at the institute in 1975.

In 1972, he and professor Jan Mohr established the Copenhagen Family Bank, a database of DNA samples from approximately 1000 large Danish families.

Hans Eiberg contributed to the mapping of the human genome, and has succeeded in finding important genetic markers for several serious illnesses such as cystic fibrosis, Batten disease and various diseases of the eye. He has also shown that bedwetting is a hereditary disease rather than a psychological disturbance.

Hans Eiberg has written more than 250 articles published in international journals.
