= Landsteiner =

Landsteiner is a surname. Notable people with the surname include:

- Karl Landsteiner (1868–1943), Austrian-American biologist and physician
  - Landsteiner, a tiny, bowl-shaped lunar impact crater
  - Donath-Landsteiner syndrome
  - Landsteiner-Wiener antigen system
