= Otto Renner =

German botanist, geneticist and university teacher (1883–1960)

- Born: 25 April 1883; Neu-Ulm, Swabia, Bavaria, Germany
- Died: 18 July 1960 (aged 77)
- Education: Ludwig-Maximilians-Universität München, Leipzig University
- Known for: Establishing the theory of maternal plastid inheritance
- Scientific career
- Fields: Plant genetics
- Institutions: Ludwig-Maximilians-Universität München, University of Jena
- Academic advisors: Karl von Goebel, Ludwig Radlkofe, Wilhelm Pfeffer
- Author abbrev. (botany): Renner

Otto Renner ForMemRS (25 April 1883 in Neu-Ulm – 8 July 1960) was a German plant geneticist. Following the work of Erwin Baur, Renner established the theory of maternal plastid inheritance as a widely accepted genetic theory.

He studied botany under Karl von Goebel and Ludwig Radlkofer at the Ludwig-Maximilians-Universität München, and with Wilhelm Pfeffer at the University of Leipzig. From 1913 to 1920, he served as an associate professor of plant physiology at the Ludwig-Maximilians-Universität München, and afterwards succeeded Christian Ernst Stahl as chair of botany at the University of Jena, where he was also director of the botanical gardens. In 1946, he returned as a professor to the Ludwig-Maximilians-Universität München.

Renner worked with plants from the genus Oenothera (evening primroses). His research of hybrid forms of Oenothera contributed significantly to the understanding of mutations.

From 1932 to 1943 he was editor of the botanical journal Flora. He was elected a Foreign Member of the Royal Society and an International member of the American Academy of Arts and Sciences, the United States National Academy of Sciences, and the American Philosophical Society. The plant genus Rennera (family Asteraceae) was named in his honor by Hermann Merxmüller.

== Selected works ==
- Beiträge zur Anatomie und Systematik der Artocarpeen und Conocephaleen insbesondere der Gattung Ficus, 1906 (doctoral thesis).
- Untersuchungen über die faktorielle Konstitution einiger komplexheterozygotischer Önotheren, 1925.
- Artbastarde bei Pflanzen, 1929.
- Führer durch die Gewächshäuser des Botanischen Gartens München-Nymphenburg, 1951.
- William Bateson und Carl Correns, 1961 – William Bateson and Carl Correns.
