= Friedrich Vogel (human geneticist) =

German human geneticist (1925–2006)

- Born: Friedrich Otto Vogel; 5 March 1925; Berlin, Weimar Republic
- Died: 5 August 2006 (aged 81); Heidelberg, Germany
- Education: Free University of Berlin
- Scientific career
- Fields: Human genetics
- Workplaces: Heidelberg University

Signature
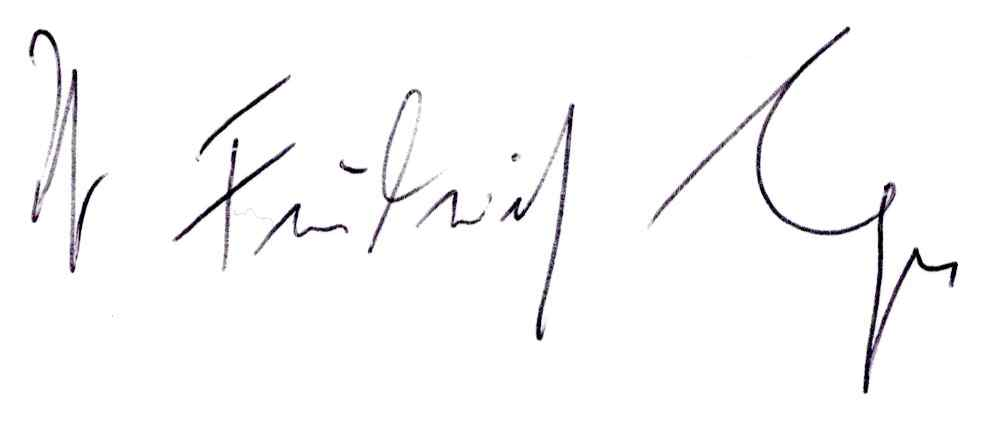

Friedrich Otto Vogel (6 March 1925, Berlin – 5 August 2006, Heidelberg) was a German human geneticist. Together with Arno Motulsky he established the journal Human Genetics in 1964, of which he remained editor-in-chief for more than 25 years. He was a member of the Heidelberger Akademie der Wissenschaften. In 1962, Vogel was named professor of human genetics and founding chair of the Institute of Anthropology and Human Genetics at Heidelberg University. Vogel became the leading German human geneticist and played a significant role in the rehabilitation of this field after the misuse of genetics by the Nazi regime (1932–1945).

== Selected works ==
- Vogel, Friedrich (1961). Lehrbuch der allgemeinen Humangenetik (in German). Berlin, Göttingen, Heidelberg: Springer. ISBN 978-3-642-87295-2.
- Fuhrmann, Walter; Vogel, Friedrich (1975). Genetische Familienberatung : ein Leitfaden für Studenten und Ärzte (in German) (2nd ed.). Berlin: Springer-Verlag. ISBN 978-3-540-07486-1.
- Vogel, Friedrich; Motulsky, Arno (1979). Human Genetics: Problems and Approaches. Berlin: Springer-Verlag. ISBN 3-540-09459-8.
- Vogel, Friedrich; Propping, Peter (1981). Ist unser Schicksal mitgeboren? (in German). Berlin: Severin und Siedler. ISBN 3-88680-012-1.
