= Jane M. Olson =

American epidemiologist

- Born: December 6, 1952; Concord, New Hampshire
- Died: May 2, 2004 (aged 51)
- Education: University of New Hampshire, Wayne State University, University of Michigan (Ph.D. 1991)
- Known for: Advanced statistical methods in genetic epidemiology, genetic linkage to Crohn's disease
- Scientific career
- Fields: Epidemiology, statistics
- Workplaces: Harvard Medical School, University of Washington, State University of New York, Case Western Reserve University

Jane M. Olson (6 December 1952 – 2 May 2004) was an American genetic epidemiologist and biostatistician, "best known internationally for her contributions to advanced statistical methods in genetic epidemiology".

== Early life and education ==
Olson was born on 6 December 1952 in Concord, New Hampshire in 1952, the sixth of seven children. Her father was one of three medical doctors in the town. In 1974, she was awarded a bachelor's degree in psychology (summa cum laude) from the University of New Hampshire. After graduating she worked as a research assistant in the Biophysics Research Laboratory at Harvard Medical School. Although originally intending to pursue a medical degree, in 1978 Olson began a graduate program in psychology at Wayne State University. For several years she worked as a biostatistician, and ultimately entered a graduate program in the Department of Biostatistics at the University of Michigan. She was awarded her M.S. in 1988 and then her Ph.D. in 1991. Her work on segregation of the taste phenotype phenylthiocarbamide earned her a nomination for a student award at the 1988 meeting of the American Society of Human Genetics.

== Research career ==
Upon obtaining her doctorate, Olson spent three years working as a postdoctoral fellow at the University of Washington. There she "developed statistical methods for model-free genetic linkage analysis". She subsequently became involved in the National Wilms Tumor Study Group. She then worked as a research assistant in the Department of Biometry and Biomathematics at the State University of New York, Roswell Park Division. Finally in 1995, she joined the Department of Epidemiology and Biostatistics at Case Western Reserve University, and shortly before her death was awarded tenure. During her career she published 53 articles and at the time of her death had 7 articles in submission. According to her obituary in the American Journal of Human Genetics, "In 1996, she coauthored a much-cited paper, published in Nature, describing the first genetic linkage to Crohn's disease and the first use of multipoint-linkage analysis in genetic mapping of a complex disease. At the International Genetic Epidemiology Society meeting in 2001, she received the Best Paper in Genetic Epidemiology award for 2000. She later developed the conditional logistic model for studying linkage from a sample of affected relative pairs. This model parsimoniously includes environmental covariates to allow for gene-environment interaction and successfully showed that APP is a candidate locus for late-onset—as well as early-onset—Alzheimer disease."

=== Notable publications ===
- Co-editor of the Encyclopedia Biostatistical Genetics and Genetic Epidemiology
- Contributed to the Encyclopedia of Biostatistics

=== Professional memberships ===
Olson was a member of the following organisations:

- American Society of Human Genetics
- American Statistical Association
- International Genetic Epidemiology Society
- International Biometric Society

Fun facts:

- Outside of her research, it was less known that she was a dedicated teacher, mentor, and collaborator with everyone around her.
- Many of her students nominated her for the "Epidemiology & Biostatistics departmental Teacher of the Year award prior to her final hospitalization"
