= Harry Harris (geneticist) =

British-born biochemist (1919–1994)

- Born: 30 September 1919; Manchester, England
- Died: 17 July 1994 (aged 74); Newtown Square, Pennsylvania.
- Citizenship: British
- Education: Manchester Grammar School; Trinity College, Cambridge; Manchester Royal Infirmary
- Known for: Biochemical variations (e.g. blood groups)
- Spouse: Muriel Hargest (1948)
- Children: Toby Harris
- Awards: William Allan Award (1968)
- Scientific career
- Fields: Biochemistry; Genetics
- Workplaces: University College London; London University; University of Pennsylvania

Harry Harris FRS, FCRP (30 September 1919 – 17 July 1994) was a British-born biochemist. His work showed that human genetic variation was not rare and disease-causing but instead was common and usually harmless. He was the first to demonstrate, with biochemical tests, that with the exception of identical twins we are all different at the genetic level. This work paved the way for many well-known genetic concepts and procedures such as DNA fingerprinting, the prenatal diagnosis of disorders using genetic markers, the extensive heterogeneity of inherited diseases, and the mapping of human genes to chromosomes

== Education ==
Born in Manchester, Harris attended Manchester Grammar School before continuing his education at Trinity College, Cambridge, and Manchester Royal Infirmary, where he received a Bachelor of Arts (1941), a Bachelor of Medicine (1943), a Master of Arts (1946) (for "The Aetiology of Premature Baldness") and a doctorate in medicine (1949).

== Royal Air Force: 1944–47 ==
From 1945 to 1947 Harris served in the Royal Air Force as Medical Officer. It was there that he began his studies in human genetics with inheritance of premature baldness.

== Academic career ==
In 1947 Harris joined the Galton Laboratory at University College London (UCL) as a research assistant. In 1948 he married Muriel Hargest; they had one child, Toby Harris. In 1950 he joined the teaching faculty as a lecturer in the department of biochemistry.

While at the Galton Laboratory Harris focused on a number of diseases, including diabetes mellitus, a disease that he would later develop. In collaboration with Charles Enrique Dent and William Warren, Harris focused on cystinuria. Using 2D paper chromatography and polarimetry, state-of-the-art technology at that time, they elucidated the genetics of the disease and other amino-acidurias diseases.

This work and others was included in his first book, An Introduction to Human Biochemical Genetics (1953). At the same time he was promoted to the position of senior lecturer and became a reader in Biochemical Genetics in 1958. During that time Harris began two new major lines of research. The first in pharmacogenetics was concerned with the genetics and biochemistry of pseudocholinesterase. The second research focus was on gene product analysis, where he used starch gel electrophoresis to explore the genetic diversity of plasma proteins (such as haptoglobins and transferrins).

In 1960 Harris left UCL and became professor and chairman of the department of biochemistry at King's College London. He established the Medical Research Council (MRC) Unit of Human and Biochemical Genetics in 1962. The main purpose of the Unit was to investigate the extent of genetic variation in healthy humans using family and population studies and simple screening techniques.

In 1965, Harris returned to UCL and succeeded Lionel Penrose as professor of human genetics, a post he held until 1976. The Unit moved with him. The staff of the Unit identified over 30 new enzyme polymorphisms and continued to make contributions to linkage studies until 2000.

In 1976 Harris and his wife left England for the University of Pennsylvania, where he held the position of Harnwell Professor of Human Genetics. Harris retired in 1990 and became emeritus professor at the University of Pennsylvania.

=== Death: 1994 ===
Complications from small strokes contributed to Harris's death in 1994 at the age of 73.

== Honours and awards ==
Harris was presented with the Ambuj Nath Bose Prize from the Royal College of Physicians (1965) He became a Fellow of the Royal Society in 1966 and a Fellow of the Royal College of Physicians in 1973. He was named a Foreign Associate of the National Academy of Sciences, and earned the William Allan Award of the American Society of Human Genetics in 1968. He was honoured with the degree of Dr. Honoris Causa by the Université René Descartes, Paris in 1976.

== Publications ==
=== Books and journals ===
- An Introduction to Human Biochemical Genetics (1953)
- Human Biochemical Genetics (1959)
- Archibald Garrod and Harry Harris. Inborn Errors of Metabolism, third edition 1963
- The Principles of Human Biochemical Genetics (1970)
- Prenatal diagnosis and selective abortion (1975)
- David A. Hopkinson and Harry Harris. Handbook of Enzyme Electrophoresis in Human Genetics (1976)
- Advances in Human Genetics (1965–1990). A journal that Harris started in 1965 with Kurt Hirschhorn. It continued until Harris' retirement in 1990.

=== Select papers ===
Harris authored and co-authored more than 340 manuscripts, a selection of which are below.

- Harris, H (1974). "Genetic heterogeneity in inherited disease". J Clin Pathol Suppl (R Coll Pathol). 8: 32–7. doi:10.1136/jcp.27.Suppl_8.32. PMC 1347202. PMID 4536365.
- Moak, G; Harris, H (1979). "Lack of homology between dog and human placental alkaline phosphatases". Proceedings of the National Academy of Sciences USA. 76 (4): 1948–51. Bibcode:1979PNAS...76.1948M. doi:10.1073/pnas.76.4.1948. PMC 383510. PMID 287036.
- Goldstein, DJ; Rogers, CE; Harris, H (1980). "Expression of alkaline phosphatase loci in mammalian tissues". Proceedings of the National Academy of Sciences USA. 77 (5): 2857–60. Bibcode:1980PNAS...77.2857G. doi:10.1073/pnas.77.5.2857. PMC 349504. PMID 6930672.
- Harris, H (1947). "A pedigree of sex-linked ichthyosis vulgaris". Annals of Eugenics. 14 (1): 9. doi:10.1111/j.1469-1809.1947.tb02373.x. PMID 18897932.
- Harris, Harry (1947). "The relation of hair-growth on the body to baldness". The British Journal of Dermatology and Syphilis. 59 (8–9): 300–309. doi:10.1111/j.1365-2133.1947.tb10910.x. PMID 20262897. S2CID 9479118.
- Harris, Harry (1947). "A genetical factor in perniosis". Annals of Eugenics. 14 (pt 1): 32–34. doi:10.1111/j.1469-1809.1947.tb02375.x. PMID 18897934.
- Harris, Harry (1949). "The incidence of parental consanguinity in diabetes mellitus". Annals of Eugenics. 14 (4): 293–300. doi:10.1111/j.1469-1809.1947.tb02406.x. PMID 18146264.
- Harris, Harry (1948). "On sex limitations in human genetics". Eugenics Review. 40 (2): 70–76. PMC 2986523. PMID 18886448.

== Harry Harris Archive ==
The papers of Harry Harris, an archived collection of documents and correspondence from 1946 to 1990, are housed at the University of Pennsylvania. Included in the collection are his publications, lectures, theses of his students, photographs, and correspondence with numerous distinguished scientists including Victor A. McKusick, Lionel Penrose, John Maynard Smith, Robert Guthrie, J. B. S. Haldane, Hans Grüneberg, Joseph L. Goldstein, and Michael Stuart Brown.
