= Erwin Baur =

German botanist (1875–1933)

- Born: 16 April 1875; Ichenheim, Grand Duchy of Baden
- Died: 2 December 1933 (aged 58)
- Known for: Plant virology; discovery of the inheritance of plastids
- Scientific career
- Fields: Plant genetics
- Institutions: Kaiser Wilhelm Institute for Breeding Research, Müncheberg, Germany

Erwin Baur (16 April 1875, in Ichenheim, Grand Duchy of Baden – 2 December 1933) was a German geneticist and botanist. Baur worked primarily on plant genetics. He was director of the Kaiser Wilhelm Institute for Breeding Research (then in Müncheberg, now in Cologne, and since 1938 the Erwin Baur-Institute). Baur is considered to be the father of plant virology. He discovered the inheritance of plastids.

In 1908 Baur demonstrated a lethal gene in the Antirrhinum plant. In 1909 working on the chloroplast genes in Pelargonium (geraniums) he showed that they violated four of Mendel's five laws. Baur stated that

1. During asexual reproduction, nuclear genes never segregate during cellular divisions. This is to ensure that each daughter cell gets a copy of every gene. However, organelle genes in heteroplasmic cells can segregate because they each have several copies of their genome. This may result in daughter cells with differential proportions of organelle genotypes.
2. Mendel states that nuclear alleles always segregate during meiosis. However, organelle alleles may or may not do this.
3. Nuclear genes are inherited from a combination of alleles from both parents, making inheritance biparental. Conversely, organelle inheritance is uniparental, meaning the genes are all inherited from one parent.
4. It is also unlikely for organelle alleles to segregate independently, like nuclear alleles do, because plastid genes are usually on a single chromosome and recombination is limited by uniparental inheritance.

Since the 1930s and the work of Otto Renner, plastid inheritance became a widely accepted genetic theory.

In 1921 and 1932, together with Fritz Lenz and Eugen Fischer, Baur coauthored two volumes that became the book Menschliche Erblichkeitslehre (Human Heredity), which was a major influence on the racial theories of Adolf Hitler. The work served a chief inspiration for biological support in Hitler's Mein Kampf.
