= MIT Department of Biology =

College department and research center

- Established: 1871
- Affiliations: Massachusetts Institute of Technology
- Department Head: Amy Keating
- Location: Cambridge, Massachusetts, United States
- Website: biology.mit.edu

The MIT Department of Biology ("Course VII") is a center for research and teaching in the life sciences. Many members of the faculty hold joint appointments with other departments at MIT and with outside institutions.

== Faculty members ==
As of 2020 faculty members include:

=== Full Professors ===
- Tania A. Baker
- David Bartel
- Stephen P. Bell
- Christopher Burge
- Iain Cheeseman
- Jianzhu Chen
- Cathy Drennan
- Gerald Fink
- Frank Gertler
- Alan Grossman
- Leonard P. Guarente
- H. Robert Horvitz, S.B. 1968
- David Housman
- Richard Hynes
- Barbara Imperiali
- Tyler Jacks
- Rudolf Jaenisch
- Chris Kaiser
- Amy Keating
- Monty Krieger
- Eric S. Lander
- Michael T. Laub
- Jacqueline Lees
- Gene-Wei Li
- Troy Littleton
- Harvey F. Lodish
- David C. Page
- Uttam RajBhandary
- Peter Reddien
- Aviv Regev
- David M. Sabatini
- Robert T. Sauer
- Thomas Schwartz
- Phillip A. Sharp
- Anthony Sinskey
- Hazel Sive
- Frank Solomon
- Lisa Steiner
- Susumu Tonegawa
- Matthew Vander Heiden
- Graham Walker
- Robert A. Weinberg, Ph.D. 1969
- Michael B. Yaffe
- Richard A. Young

=== Associate professors ===
- Laurie Boyer
- Mary Gehring
- Michael Hemann
- Adam C. Martin

=== Assistant professors ===
- Eliezer Calo
- Lindsay Case
- Joseph H. Davis
- Ankur Jain
- Rebecca Lamason
- Gene-Wei Li
- Pulin Li
- Sebastian Lourido
- Stefani Spranger
- Seychelle Vos
- Omer Yilmaz

=== Professors with primary appointments in other departments ===
- Sallie (Penny) Chisholm
- Douglas Lauffenburger
- Elly Nedivi
- Matthew Wilson

=== Professors emeriti ===
- Martha Constantine-Paton
- Malcolm Gefter
- Nancy Hopkins
- Jonathan King
- Terry Orr-Weaver
- Mary-Lou Pardue
- Sheldon Penman
- Phillips Robbins
- Robert Rosenberg
- Leona D. Samson
- Paul Schimmel
- Edward Scolnick
- Ethan Signer
- JoAnne Stubbe
- William (Chip) Quinn

== Department Heads ==
- 1889-1921 William T. Sedgwick
- 1921-1942 Samuel C. Prescott
- 1942-1955 Francis O. Schmitt
- 1957-1966 Irwin W. Sizer
- 1966-1977 Boris Magasanik
- 1977-1985 Gene M. Brown
- 1985-1989 Maurice Fox
- 1989-1991 Richard O. Hynes
- 1991-1999 Phillip Sharp
- 1999-2004 Robert T. Sauer
- 2004-2012 Chris Kaiser
- 2012-2014 Tania Baker
- 2014-2023 Alan Grossman
- 2023 Amy Keating

== Alumni ==
Alumni of the department include:

=== Nobel laureates ===
The department can claim several winners of the Nobel Prize for Physiology or Medicine among its faculty and alumni. They are:

- Michael Rosbash, 2017
- Andrew Fire, 2006
- H. Robert Horvitz, 2002
- Leland H. Hartwell, 2001
- Phillip A. Sharp, 1993
- E. Donnall Thomas, 1990
- Susumu Tonegawa, 1987
- David Baltimore, 1975
- Salvador Luria, 1969
- Har Gobind Khorana, 1968

=== Former faculty ===
Former faculty include:

- Angelika Amon
- Gene Brown
- Arnold Demain
- Herman Eisen
- Vernon Ingram
- Susan Lindquist
- Maurice Fox
- Har Gobind Khorana
- Irving London
- Salvador Luria
- Alexander Rich

=== Other notable alumni ===
Other notable alumni include

- Victor Ambros, Ph.D., 1979
- Cornelia Bargmann, Ph.D., 1987
- Kevin Eggan, Ph.D., 2002
- Stephen J. Elledge, Ph.D., 1983
- Andrew Fire, Ph.D., 1983
- Leland H. Hartwell, Ph.D., 1964
- Richard O. Hynes, Ph.D., 1971
- Cynthia Kenyon, Ph.D., 1979
- Michael Rosbash, Ph.D., 1970
- Allan C. Spradling, Ph.D., 1975
