= George W. Beadle Award =

Scientific prize for research in genetics

- George W. Beadle (1903–1989)
- Awarded for: outstanding contributions to the community of genetics researchers
- Date: 1999
- Country: United States
- Presented by: Genetics Society of America
- Website: www.genetics-gsa.org/awards/beadleaward.shtml

The George W. Beadle Award is a scientific prize given by the Genetics Society of America to individuals who have made “outstanding contributions” to Genetics. The Award was established in 1999 and named in honor of George Wells Beadle, who won the Nobel Prize in Physiology or Medicine in 1958.

== Laureates ==
Source: Genetics Society of America

- 1999 Michael Ashburner
- 2000 John Sulston and Robert Waterston
- 2001 Gerald Fink
- 2002 André Goffeau and Robert K. Mortimer
- 2003 Gerald M. Rubin and Allan C. Spradling
- 2004 Norbert Perrimon, Harvard Medical School
- 2005 Thomas C. Kaufman, Indiana University
- 2006 Fred Sherman, University of Rochester
- 2007 Robert K. Herman, University of Minnesota
- 2008 Mark Johnston, Washington University School of Medicine
- 2009 Jay C. Dunlap, Dartmouth Medical School
- 2010 William M. Gelbart, Harvard University
- 2011 Joseph R. Ecker, Salk Institute for Biological Studies
- 2012 Therese Markow, University of California, San Diego
- 2013 R. Scott Hawley, Stowers Institute for Medical Research
- 2014 Hugo J. Bellen, Baylor College of Medicine
- 2015 John Postlethwait, University of Oregon
- 2016 Susan Celniker, Lawrence Berkeley National Laboratory
- 2017 Susan A. Gerbi, Brown University
- 2018 Philip Hieter, University of British Columbia
- 2019 Michael P. Snyder, Stanford University
- 2020 Julie Ahringer, Cambridge University
- 2021 Chao-ting Wu, Harvard Medical School
- 2022 Shirley M. Tilghman, Princeton University

== See also ==
- List of genetics awards
