= Fred Sherman (scientist) =

American geneticist

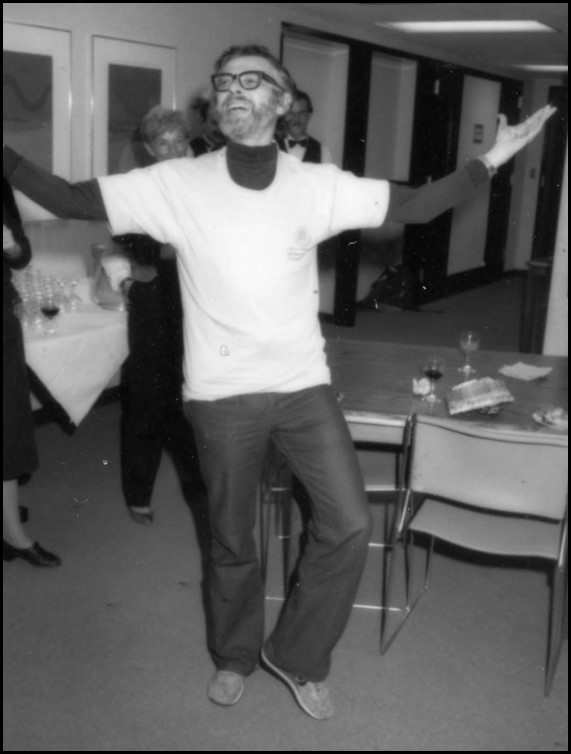
- Dancing - National Academy of Sciences 1985
- Born: May 21, 1932; Minneapolis, Minnesota
- Died: September 16, 2013 (aged 81)
- Education: University of Minnesota; University of California, Berkeley
- Spouse: Elena Rustchenko-Bulgac PhD (m. 2001)
- Awards: Lifetime Achievement Award, Genetics Society of America (2006); George W. Beadle Award (2006)
- Scientific career
- Fields: Biophysics; Biochemistry; Genetics
- Workplaces: University of Rochester
- Thesis: A Study of the Effects of Elevated Temperature on the Growth and Inheritance of Saccharomyces cerevisiae (1959)
- Doctoral advisor: Robert K. Mortimer

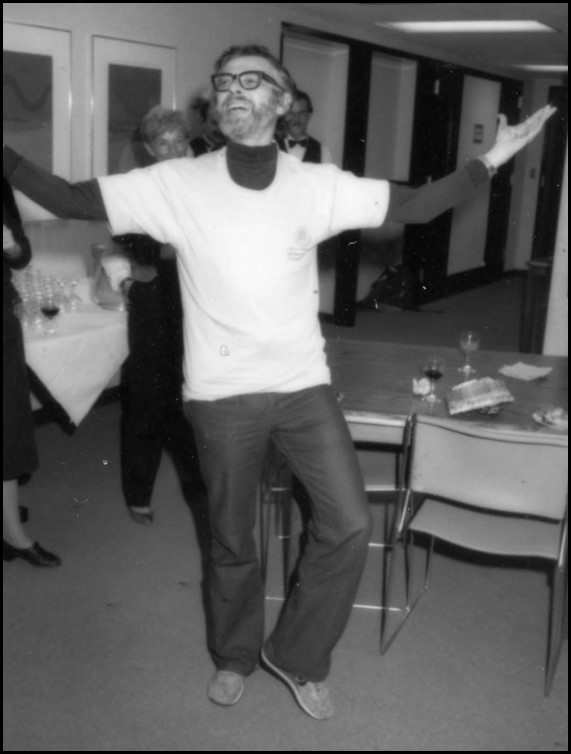
Fred dancing at a party to celebrate his National Academy of Sciences Induction (1985)

Fred Sherman (May 21, 1932 – September 16, 2013) was an American scientist who pioneered the use of the budding yeast Saccharomyces cerevisiae as a model for studying the genetics, molecular biology, and biochemistry of eukaryotic cells. His research encompassed broad areas of yeast biology including gene expression, protein synthesis, messenger RNA processing, bioenergetics, and mechanisms of mutagenesis. He also contributed extensively to the genetics of the opportunistic pathogen Candida albicans.

Sherman was a strong proponent of the use of baker's yeast as a genetic model system and played a major role in the adoption of yeast genetic approaches by scientists around the world. This was partly through his role for 17 years as co-instructor, with Gerald Fink, of a summer course in yeast genetics at Cold Spring Harbor Laboratory that trained many scientists who went on to make their own seminal contributions in broad areas of biology.

Born in Minnesota, Sherman assumed a faculty position at the University of Rochester in Rochester, NY in 1962 and remained at that institution throughout his career, continuing to be active well into his sixth decade of teaching and research. In addition to his scientific achievements, intellectual rigor, and encyclopedic knowledge of many fields of biology, he was also known for his sense of humor.

== Early life ==
Sherman was born in Minneapolis, Minnesota to Jewish Ukrainian immigrant parents. His birth certificate lists his first name as "Freddie". The family lived in a single room behind his father's grocery store in which Sherman and his younger sister, since their early childhood, often served customers in the absence of their parents.

== Education ==
Sherman graduated magna cum laude with a BA in chemistry from the University of Minnesota in 1953. He obtained his PhD with Robert Mortimer at the University of California, Berkeley where he was introduced to yeast and then studied with two other founding yeast geneticists, Hershel Roman in Seattle and Boris Ephrussi in France.

== Scientific contributions ==
In the 1960s, Sherman used yeast to develop the foremost system in which genetic changes in a eukaryotic gene could be studied by sequencing a readily-purified protein encoded by that gene. By focusing on CYC1, the gene encoding one form of the yeast mitochondrial protein cytochrome c, he was able to answer many fundamental questions including the universality of the genetic code. ^{[4][6]} Although this was well before DNA could be directly sequenced, Sherman was able to deduce the DNA sequence of the first 15 amino acids of the CYC1 gene by sequencing (together with collaborator, John Stewart) over 3000 mutant forms of the cytochrome c protein. The observed pattern of amino acid changes allowed them to establish that the genetic code in eukaryotes was the same in all key respects as the code that had been established in the bacterium E. coli and in bacteriophages. A key finding was that AUG was the primary initiation codon in eukaryotic protein translation. The deduction of the CYC1 DNA sequence led to the cloning and full sequencing of the CYC1 gene, one of the first eukaryotic protein-coding genes to be characterized at this level.

Sherman exploited the yeast cytochrome c system to investigate nearly every stage and regulatory mechanism in gene expression including: 1) Identification of critical DNA sequences that control transcription initiation and termination; 2) Identification of mechanisms of RNA processing and degradation; 3) Identification of the roles of RNA sequences that control initiation of translation; 4) Isolation of "nonsense suppressor" mutations in tRNA genes and protein-coding genes that cause read-through at nonsense (stop) codons, thereby preventing termination of protein synthesis; 5) Identification of mechanisms of intracellular trafficking of cytochrome c to mitochondria; 6) Identification of mutations affecting protein folding and stability; 7) Detection of the effects of chaperones on protein stability; 8) Characterization of the roles of post-translational modifications of proteins such as methylation, acetylation, ubiquitination, N-terminal proteolytic processing, and covalent attachment of heme; 9) Identification of mechanisms of protein degradation in mitochondria; 10) Understanding the roles of various mitochondrial proteins in bioenergetics and metabolic processes; and Batten disease (together with D. Pearce).

The approaches and innovative methods pursued by Sherman led to improved understanding of genetic and evolutionary processes such as genetic recombination, gene conversion, retrotransposon transposition, the effects of chemical mutagens, and the roles of large chromosomal rearrangements. He developed important genetic tools for yeast molecular biology, such as procedures for screening for mutations in yeast, for site-directed mutagenesis using direct transformation of yeast with synthetic oligonucleotides, for genetic mapping of mutations in yeast, and for facilitating analysis of yeast genetic crosses.

== Career ==
Fred Sherman was first appointed as assistant professor in the Department of Radiation Biology and Biophysics at the School of Medicine and Dentistry of the University of Rochester in 1962. He was promoted to the rank of full professor in 1971, then served as Chairman of the Department of Biochemistry, and, subsequently, the Department of Biochemistry & Biophysics from 1982-1999.

In 1970 Sherman co-founded, with Gerald Fink, the Cold Spring Harbor Laboratory course in yeast genetics and molecular biology, in which he continued to serve as co-director until 1987.

During his long and distinguished career he published over 250 articles on the molecular biology and genetic of yeast and was funded through a major NIH grant for 42 years.

== Recognition ==
Fred Sherman's significant contributions to the area of yeast biology were recognized by his election to the National Academy of Sciences in 1985, and his appointment in 2000 Sherman as Chair of the Genetics Section of the National Academy. He received an honorary doctoral degree from the University of Minnesota in 2003. During 2006, he was appointed as a fellow of the AAAS and awarded both the Lifetime Achievement Award and the George Wells Beadle Medal of the Genetics Society of America for "distinguished service to the field of genetics and to the genetics community." He was also a member of the American Academy of Microbiology. An ongoing annual lecture in his name has attracted high profile speakers to the University of Rochester.

=== Awards and honors ===
- National Academy of Sciences (1985) (Chairman, Genetics Section National Academy of Sciences, 2000-2003)
- FEBS Lecturer (1982)
- Associate editor, Molecular and Cellular Biology (1979-1988)
- Associate editor, YEAST (1985-2013)
- Associate editor, Genetics (1975–82)
- Comm. Chem. Environmental Mutagens, Natl. Res. Council (1979–83)
- Instructor, Cold Spring Harbor Labs (1970–87)
- Wander Memorial Lecturer (1975)
- Wilson Professorship (1982)
- Genetics Society of America board of directors (1984–85)
- American Cancer Society Study Section (1982–88)
- NIH Study Section (1990-1995)
- Scientific Review Panel, Israel Cancer Research Fund (1996-1999)
- magna cum laude, University of Minnesota (1953)
- American Academy of Microbiology (1997)
- Howard Hughes Evaluation Panel (1997-2003) (Chairman, 2000–2003)
- Arthur Kornberg Research Award, 1999
- Honorary Doctorate degree, University of Minnesota (2002)
- AAAS Fellow (2006)
- George W. Beadle Award, Genetics Society of America (2006)
- Lifetime Achievement Award, Genetics Society of America (2006)

== Book chapters ==
- An Introduction to the Genetics and Molecular Biology of the Yeast 'Saccharomyces cerevisiae'
- Getting Started with Yeast
- My Life with Cytochrome C: The Early Days of Yeast Genetics; Cold Spring Harbor Press.
