= Anton Yuryev =

Russian-American scientist

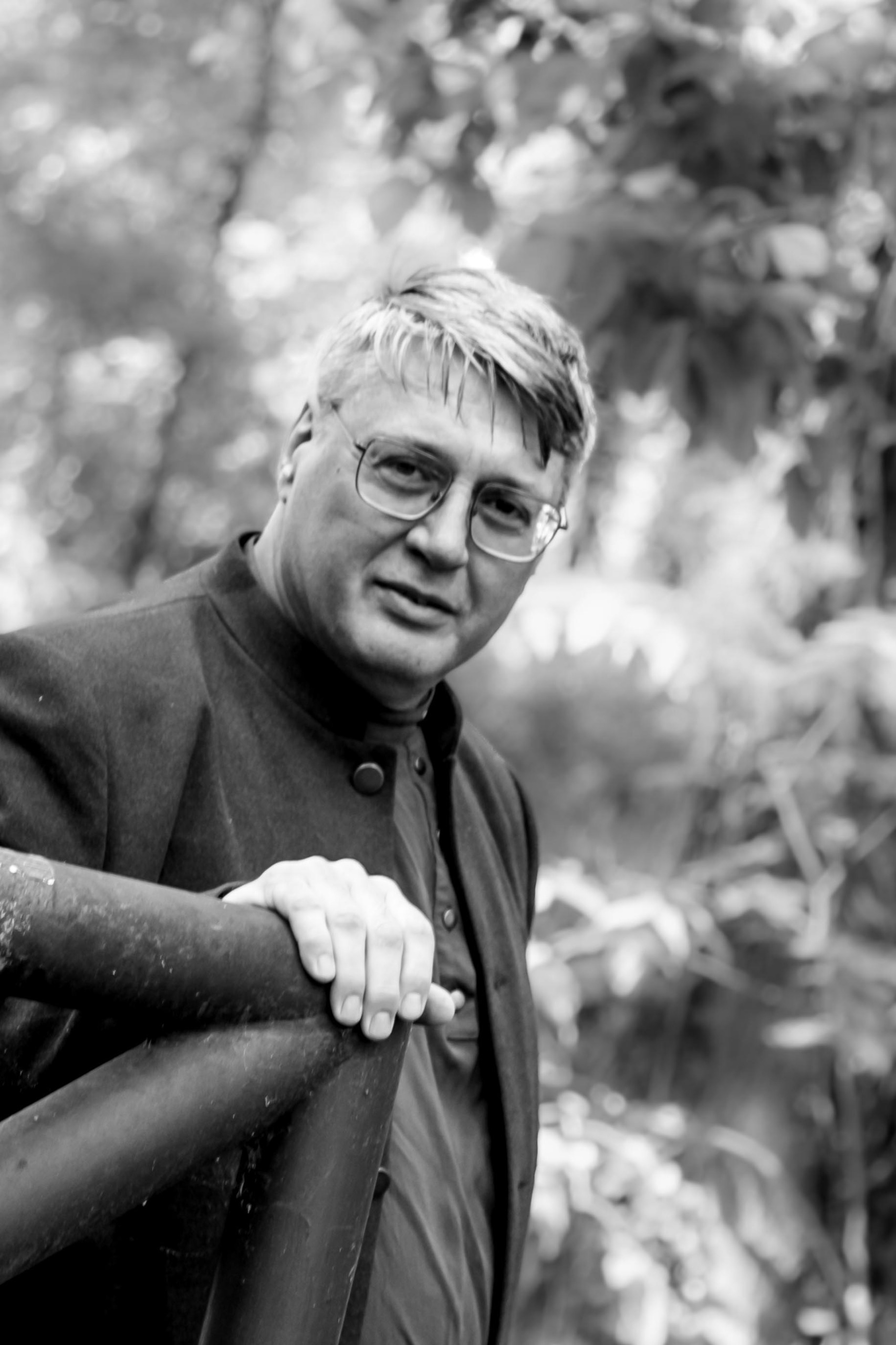
- Education: Shemyakin and Ovchinnikov Institute of Bioorganic Chemistry (M.Sc.); Johns Hopkins University (Ph.D.)
- Scientific career
- Workplaces: Elsevier
- Academic advisors: Jef Boeke; Daniel Nathans

Anton Yuryev is a Russian American scientist. He co-founded Ariadne Genomics, acquired by Elsevier in 2011. After Elsevier acquired Ariadne, he became Professional Services Director.

== Biography ==
Anton Yuryev was born in Moscow, Russia in 1966. He is the son of Dmitri Furman, Russian political scientist, sociologist, and expert on religions.

=== Education ===
Yuryev received his B.Sc. in physics from Moscow Institute of Physics and Technology in 1987. He received his M.Sc. in Molecular Biology and Bioorganic chemistry from Shemyakin-Ovchinnikov Institute of bioorganic chemistry in 1989.

Anton Yuryev received his Ph.D. in Molecular Biology and Genetics from Johns Hopkins University in 1995.

Yuryev's Ph.D. advisory committee at Johns Hopkins University included several prominent molecular biologists: yeast geneticist Jef Boeke and Nobel laureate Daniel Nathans.

Yuryev was awarded Ph.D. at Johns Hopkins University for discovery of novel family of proteins interacting with C-terminal domain of RNA polymerase II holoenzyme using yeast two-hybrid screening. Sequence similarity of these proteins to splicing factors suggested the existence of physical coupling between transcription and post-transcriptional modification of messenger RNA.

He continued his research as postdoctoral fellow at Novartis Pharmaceuticals where he demonstrated that mammalian ARAF protein kinase can be imported into mitochondria. During the completion of human genome sequencing he started working in the new emerging field of bioinformatics.

In 1995, several faculty members at Johns Hopkins University authored letters of recommendation concerning Anton Yuryev’s work during his graduate studies. Addressed to his postdoctoral supervisor at Ciba-Geigy, Dr. Wennogle, the letters written by senior and junior faculty including Daniel Nathans, Phil Hieter, Jeff Corden, and Jef Boeke provide contemporaneous assessments of Yuryev’s scientific contributions and research potential at an early stage of his career.

== Career ==
While working at Orchid Biosciences between 2001 and 2003 he authored several algorithms for PCR primer design using statistical modeling. Anton Yuryev was one of the original owner of Ariadne Genomics Inc where he has developed methods for Natural Language Processing, for computational Pathway analysis, and studied properties of Biological network. During his tenure at Ariadne Genomics Yuryev collaborated with Maqsudul Alam on analysis of rubber tree and jute genomes as well as genomes of several extremophiles.

Yuryev has edited several scientific books and numerous research articles. Ariadne Genomics was acquired by Elsevier in 2011. Following the acquisition, Yuryev took on the role of Consulting and Professional Service Director at Elsevier. In this capacity, he has been involved in developing dedicated bioinformatics solutions leveraging Elsevier's software, knowledgebases, and artificial intelligence for applications in drug development, personalized medicine, agro- and synthetic biology. His recent work at Elsevier includes exploring the use of biomedical knowledge graphs and AI for drug repurposing, particularly for rare diseases and in precision oncology.”

== Research ==
During his doctoral studies, Yuryev reported the identification of a family of proteins linking transcription with post-transcriptional mRNA processing using the yeast two-hybrid screening method. As a postdoctoral researcher, he demonstrated the utility of yeast two-hybrid screens for identifying functional, isoform-specific protein–protein interactions, including evidence for the mitochondrial import of the A-RAF kinase.

Following the completion of the human genome sequencing, Yuryev shifted his research focus toward Bioinformatics and Computational biology. He developed algorithms for PCR primer design, biological pathway and network analysis, as well as natural language processing (NLP) approaches for constructing biomedical knowledge graphs. By integrating pathways reconstructed from biomedical knowledge graphs with orthologous mapping, he contributed to the reconstruction of metabolic and signaling systems in multiple organisms whose genomes were sequenced by Maqsudul Alam and collaborators.

In collaborative work, Yuryev and co-authors demonstrated that genome-wide protein–protein interaction networks contain a significantly higher frequency of self-interacting proteins (homodimers) and interacting paralogous proteins than would be expected by chance. They proposed that this observation is consistent with the duplication–divergence model of biological evolution.

Yuryev has authored more than 50 peer-reviewed scientific articles, as well as books and book chapters, covering topics including in silico pathway analysis, transcription factors, computational biology, and targeted cancer research. Among his publications is the article “Automatic pathway building in biological association networks,” published in BMC Bioinformatics in 2006, which has been cited in research on Systems biology and network analysis.

His current research focuses on the development of statistical methods for drug repurposing and indication expansion. This work utilizes the Elsevier Biology Knowledge Graph to identify potential new therapeutic applications for existing medications.

== Selected publications ==
=== Journals ===
- Yuryev, Anton (2 January 2015). "Gene expression profiling for targeted cancer treatment". Expert Opinion on Drug Discovery. 10 (1): 91–99. doi:10.1517/17460441.2015.971007. ISSN 1746-0441. PMID 25306865.
- Yuryev, Anton (2006). "Targeting transcription factors in cell regulation". Expert Opinion on Therapeutic Targets. 10 (3): 345–349. doi:10.1517/14728222.10.3.345. ISSN 1472-8222. PMID 16706674.
- Yuryev, Anton (1 July 2000). "Isoform-Specific Localization of A-RAF in Mitochondria". Molecular and Cellular Biology. 20 (13): 4870–4878. doi:10.1128/MCB.20.13.4870-4878.2000. PMC 85938. PMID 10848612.
- Yuryev, Anton (1 August 2008). "In silico pathway analysis: the final frontier towards completely rational drug design". Expert Opinion on Drug Discovery. 3 (8): 867–876. doi:10.1517/17460441.3.8.867. ISSN 1746-0441. PMID 23484964.
- Rahman, Ahmad Yamin Abdul; Usharraj, Abhilash O; Misra, Biswapriya B; Thottathil, Gincy P; Jayasekaran, Kandakumar; Feng, Yun; Hou, Shaobin; Ong, Su Yean; Ng, Fui Ling; Lee, Ling Sze; Tan, Hock Siew; Sakaff, Muhd Khairul Luqman Muhd; Teh, Beng Soon; Khoo, Bee Feong; Badai, Siti Suriawati (2 February 2013). "Draft genome sequence of the rubber tree Hevea brasiliensis". BMC Genomics. 14 (1): 75. Bibcode:2013BMCG...14...75R. doi:10.1186/1471-2164-14-75. ISSN 1471-2164. PMC 3575267. PMID 23375136.
- Islam, Md Shahidul; Saito, Jennifer A.; Emdad, Emdadul Mannan; Ahmed, Borhan; Islam, Mohammad Moinul; Halim, Abdul; Hossen, Quazi Md Mosaddeque; Hossain, Md Zakir; Ahmed, Rasel; Hossain, Md Sabbir; Kabir, Shah Md Tamim; Khan, Md Sarwar Alam; Khan, Md Mursalin; Hasan, Rajnee; Aktar, Nasima (30 January 2017). "Comparative genomics of two jute species and insight into fibre biogenesis". Nature Plants. 3 (2): 16223. Bibcode:2017NatPl...316223I. doi:10.1038/nplants.2016.223. ISSN 2055-0278. PMID 28134914.
- Jimmy, H W Saw; Yuryev, Anton; Kanbe, Masaomi; Hou, Shaobin; Young, Aaron G; Aizawa, Shin-Ichi; Alam, Maqsudul (5 March 2012). "Complete genome sequence of Polynucleobacter necessarius subsp. asymbioticus type strain (QLW-P1DMWA-1T)". Standards in Genomic Sciences. 6 (1): 84–93. Bibcode:2012SGenS...6...84S. doi:10.4056/sigs.2445005. ISSN 1944-3277. PMC 3368406. PMID 22675601.
- Ong, Su Yean; Ng, Fui Ling; Siti Suriawati Badai; Yuryev, Anton; Maqsudul Alam (2010). "Analysis and construction of pathogenicity island regulatory pathways in Salmonella enterica serovar Typhi". J Integr Bioinform. 7 (1). Bielefeld University Library, Bielefeld University, BieColl, Publikationsdienste.Ub@Uni-Bielefeld.De, Faculty Of Technology Applied Computer Science: 63–96. doi:10.2390/BIECOLL-JIB-2010-145. PMID 20861532.
- Dunfield, Peter F; Yuryev, Anton; Senin, Pavel; Smirnova, Angela V; Stott, Matthew B; Hou, Shaobin; Ly, Binh; Saw, Jimmy H; Zhou, Zhemin; Ren, Yan; Wang, Jianmei; Alam, Maqsudul (2007). "Methane oxidation by an extremely acidophilic bacterium of the phylum Verrucomicrobia". Nature. 450 (7171): 879–882. Bibcode:2007Natur.450..879D. doi:10.1038/nature06411. ISSN 0028-0836. PMID 18004300.

=== Books ===
- Yuryev, Anton; Daraselia, Nikolai, eds. (2012). From knowledge networks to biological models. Oak Park, Ill: Bentham eBooks. ISBN 978-1-60805-436-7.
- Yuryev, Anton, ed. (2007). PCR primer design. Methods in Molecular Biology. Totowa, NJ: Humana Press. ISBN 978-1-61737-743-3.
- Yuryev, Anton, ed. (2008). Pathway analysis for drug discovery: computational infrastructure and applications. Wiley series on technologies for the pharmaceutical industry. Hoboken, N.J: John Wiley & Sons. ISBN 978-0-470-39926-2.

=== Edited books ===
- Yuryev, Anton, ed. (2007). PCR Primer Design. Methods in Molecular Biology. Vol. 402. doi:10.1007/978-1-59745-528-2. ISBN 978-1-58829-725-9. ISSN 1064-3745.
- Yuryev, Anton, ed. (2008). Pathway analysis for drug discovery: computational infrastructure and applications. Wiley series on technologies for the pharmaceutical industry. Hoboken, N.J: John Wiley & Sons. ISBN 978-0-470-39927-9.
- Nesterova, Anastasia P.; Klimov, Eugene A.; Zharkova, Maria; Sozin, Sergey; Sobolev, Vladimir; Shkrob, Maria; Yuryev, Anton, eds. (2020). Disease pathways: an atlas of human disease signaling pathways. Cambridge, MA: Elsevier. ISBN 978-0-12-817086-1. OCLC 1057290845.
- Yuryev, Anton; Daraselia, Nikolai, eds. (2012). From knowledge networks to biological models. Oak Park, Ill: Bentham eBooks. ISBN 978-1-60805-436-7.
