= Krystal Tsosie =

Navajo geneticist and bioethicist

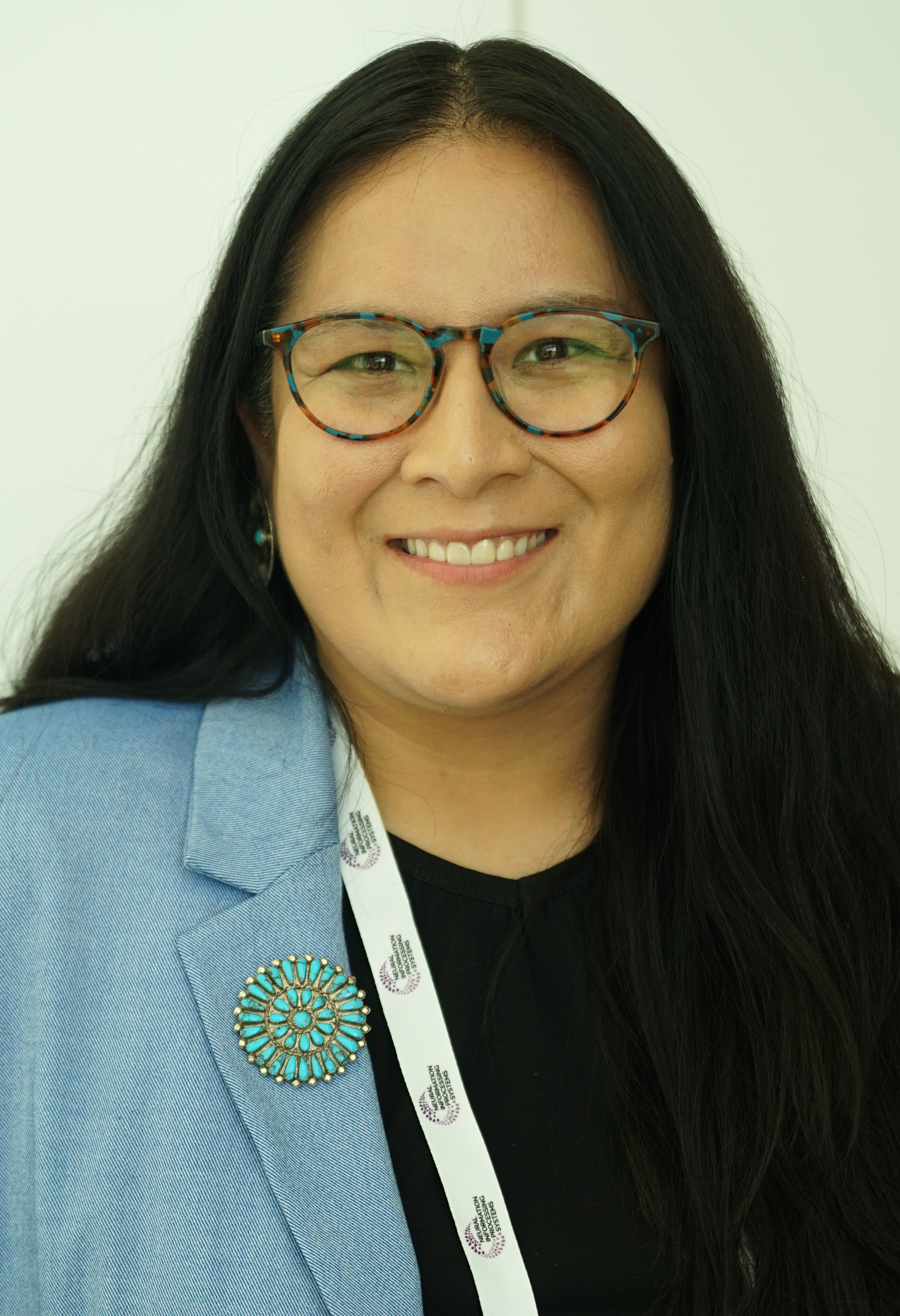
- Tsosie at NeurIPS 2025
- Occupations: Geneticist, bioethicist

Academic background
- Education: Arizona State University (BS, MA); Vanderbilt University (MPH, PhD)
- Thesis: Tribal Community Perspectives on Genomics Research and Data Sharing: A Mixed-Methods Study (2022)

Academic work
- Discipline: Genetics; Bioethics
- Institutions: Arizona State University
- Website: Krystal Tsosie on X

Krystal Tsosie (Diné) is a Navajo geneticist and bioethicist at Arizona State University and activist for Indigenous data sovereignty. She is also an educator and an expert on genetic and social identities.

== Early life and education ==
Tsosie's family had been forcibly displaced economically and geographically from their home communities, so she grew up "non-res" in West Phoenix as the only native kid in her school. Her mother comes from Shonto, Arizona and her father comes from the Loop area in Central Arizona. Tsosie's father worked in the Phoenix Indian Medical Center, the largest Indian health service clinic in the US.

Tsosie attended Arizona State University (ASU) where she received a Bachelor's degree in Microbiology, a Master's in Bioethics, and a Master's in Public Health Epidemiology. She began her work in cancer biology, and she developed and patented a combined targeted ultrasound imaging and chemotherapeutic drug delivery device for treating early metastases in cancer. However, realizing that her tribal community had difficulty accessing specialty services, she decided to change her focus to genomics and health disparities to better impact her community. While studying bioethics, Tsosie experienced the aftereffects of the Havasupai Tribe v. the Arizona Board of Regents lawsuit.

Tsosie completed her PhD in Genomics and Health Disparities at Vanderbilt University in 2022 and then worked as a Presidential Postdoctoral Fellow at ASU before joining their faculty.

== Career and research ==
Tsosie co-leads a study that investigates genetic determinants of pre-eclampsia, specifically in pregnant Turtle Mountain Band of Chippewa women and collaborates with the tribal-research review board. Tsosie's team hopes that examining potential environmental and sociocultural factors will help these specific Native women in decreasing such high rates specific to their tribe. She has also focused on researching uterine fibroids in black women using genetic information.

Tsosie "advocates strongly for genomic and data sovereignty." as stated by the American Indian Science and Engineering Society. Indigenous data sovereignty is the right of nations to govern the collection, ownership, and application of their own data, in contrast to the ways in which researchers take and use Indigenous data without permission and disregarding that Nation's traditions. Tsosie's work as an advocate for Indigenous data sovereignty has included aiding a Tribal nation in the creation of their own policies for data privacy, bio-banking, and building research space for protecting the tribe's interests.

In 2018, Tsosie co-founded the Native BioData Consortium, the first US Indigenous-led biobank. She works with a variety of other Indigenous data and genetics organizations, including the Summer Internship for Indigenous Peoples in Genomics (SING), which consists of an international set of workshops in Aotearoa (New Zealand), Canada and the United States to build capacity in the fields of genetics and genomics among Indigenous peoples. Based upon the results of its workshop projects, the SING Consortium published a framework to enhance ethical genomics research with Indigenous communities. Tsosie is also an organizer of and faculty for Indigidata, a week-long workshop that introduces tribal undergraduate and graduate students to data science and informatics skills.

In 2022-2023, Tsosie was a Global Chair of ENRICH, a "four year program designed to create an integrated international network of Indigenous and allied scholars working in Indigenous data sovereignty and governance across a variety of disciplines including law, public health, policy, and genomic sciences." This position includes a one-month residency at New York University.

In 2023, Tsosie became an assistant professor in the School of Life Sciences at The College of Liberal Arts and Sciences and the first Indigenous human geneticist at ASU. At ASU, Tsosie is leading a review of paleogenomics studies in relation to "community-engaged approaches in DNA research involving Indigenous ancestors".

=== Activism ===
Tsosie has spoken out about the controversy of Senator Elizabeth Warren's genetic testing. She has defended Indigenous sovereignty, and Indigenous cultural and political identities that she feels could be threatened when non-Natives use DNA testing in an effort to discover if they have any genetic markers that commercial DNA companies label as "Native American", leading these non-Natives to self-identify as Indigenous people. She notes that these companies often imply these markers indicate heritage from Native Americans in the United States, when they do not have sufficient population samples to reach that conclusion. More importantly, she continues, being Indigenous is more than what can be discovered in a DNA test. She writes that those who take these tests and claim to belong to specific tribes are not understanding that no DNA test can indicate tribe, and making these claims is not respecting the tribes' rules regarding citizenship status - which is defined by culture and familial relationships in a living community.

In a post to Twitter published by Mashable, Krystal Tsosie stated, "to ascribe any power to a DNA-test result dis-empowers those Native Americans who do live according to their traditions. Native American identity is not one of biology, but of culture. And, crucially, “Native American” is a political designation that confers rights. If that designation becomes tied to a DNA test, it could threaten those rights."

Tsosie also advocates for the "decolonization of DNA" and the acknowledgement that a variety of social, cultural, and colonial factors impact health and are also conflated with genetics.
