= Shahar Lev-Ari =

Israeli public health scholar

- שחר לב-ארי
- Born: 1969 (age 56–57)
- Education: Hebrew University
- Scientific career
- Workplaces: Tel Aviv University Stanford University

Shahar Lev-Ari is an Israeli public health scholar. He is a member and former Chair of the Department of Health Promotion at the School of Public Health, Sackler Faculty of Medicine at Tel Aviv University. He is a visiting scholar at Michael P. Snyder's Lab in the Department of Genetics at Stanford University.

== Career ==
Lev-Ari was trained in cellular biology and medicine, and has expertise in biology, Public health research,positive psychology, and health promotion. He has been an academic board member of the Israeli Healthy Cities Initiative, treasurer of the Israeli Organization for Health Promotion and Education, a participant in the National Council for Health Promotion, member of the Global Working Group on Mental Health Promotion, and Section Editor of Public Health at the Journal of Clinical Medicine.

Lev-Ari is the founder and former director of the Integrative Medicine Center & Laboratory of Medicinal Herbs and Cancer Research within the Institute of Oncology of Tel Aviv Sourasky Medical Center. He leads the Health Promotion research and consultation at the Integrated Cancer Prevention Center. He received the Outstanding Scientist Award from the Israeli Society for Complementary Medicine under the auspices of the Israel Medical Association (2010).

Lev-Ari's lab has developed and assessed the mechanisms and effectiveness of the inquiry based stress reduction intervention on well-being: from promotion to prevention, treatment, and recovery. He has co-authored over 75 peer-reviewed papers and book chapters - among them 15 studies assessing the effect of inquiry based stress reduction on physical and mental health among healthy individuals, teachers, adults who stutter, cancer patients and survivors, and women carrying a mutation in the BRCA gene. Further, his research interests include mmindfulness-based stress reduction, cognitive behavioral therapy, salutogenesis, resilience, well-being, and mind body interventions. His studies on longevity revealed its association with psychosocial factors and the satisfaction with one's marriage.

Lev-Ari has been a student, practitioner, and teacher of mindfulness practices and inquiry (the work of Byron Katie) in Israel and around the world for many years.
