= Markow (surname) =

Markow is a surname. It may refer to:

- Mischa Markow (1854–1934), pioneering Mormon missionary in Europe
- Therese Ann Markow, American physical anthropologist and ecologist
- Jack Markow (1905–1983), American cartoonist
