= Norton Zinder =

American microbiologist

- Born: Norton David Zinder; November 7, 1928; New York City, New York
- Died: February 3, 2012 (aged 83); New York City, New York
- Education: Columbia University (BA); University of Wisconsin–Madison (PhD)
- Known for: Transduction; Virology
- Awards: Eli Lilly and Company-Elanco Research Award (1962); NAS Award in Molecular Biology (1966); AAAS Award for Scientific Freedom and Responsibility (1982)
- Scientific career
- Fields: Microbiology
- Workplaces: Rockefeller University
- Doctoral advisor: Joshua Lederberg
- Doctoral students: Harvey Lodish; Nina Fedoroff; Jef Boeke

Norton David Zinder (November 7, 1928 – February 3, 2012) was an American biologist who discovered genetic transduction. Zinder was born in New York City, received his A.B. from Columbia University in 1947, Ph.D. from the University of Wisconsin–Madison in 1952, and became a member of the National Academy of Sciences in 1969. He led a lab at Rockefeller University until shortly before his death.

In 1966 he was awarded the NAS Award in Molecular Biology from the National Academy of Sciences.

== Genetic transduction and RNA bacteriophage ==
Working as a graduate student with Joshua Lederberg, Zinder discovered that a bacteriophage can carry genes from one bacterium to another. Initial experiments were carried out using Salmonella. Zinder and Lederberg named this process of genetic exchange transduction.

Later, Zinder discovered the first bacteriophage that contained RNA as its genetic material. At that time, Harvey Lodish (now of the Massachusetts Institute of Technology and Whitehead Institute for Biomedical Research) worked in his lab.

Norton Zinder died in 2012 of pneumonia after a long illness.
