= Jef Boeke =

American geneticist

- Born: February 15, 1954 (age 72); Albany, NY
- Education: Rockefeller University; Bowdoin College
- Known for: Retrotransposon
- Scientific career
- Fields: Molecular Biology Genetics
- Doctoral advisor: Norton Zinder
- Other academic advisors: Gerald Fink
- Doctoral students: Anton Yuryev

Jef D. Boeke (/ˈbuːkə/ BOO-kə) is an American geneticist who is currently the founding director of the Institute for Systems Genetics at NYU Langone Medical Center. From 1986 to 2014 he was on the faculty of The Johns Hopkins University School of Medicine, where he was the founding director of the High Throughput (HiT) Center. He is a member of the American Academy of Arts and Sciences as well as the National Academy of Sciences.

Boeke received a Bachelor's degree summa cum laude in Biochemistry in 1976 from Bowdoin College. He is a member of the Phi Beta Kappa chapter at Bowdoin. He then received a PhD in Molecular Biology from Rockefeller University in 1982, where he worked with Peter Model and Norton Zinder on the genetics of the filamentous phage. He did his postdoctoral work at The Whitehead Institute of MIT as a Helen Hay Whitney Postdoctoral Fellow with Gerald Fink.

Boeke is primarily known for his pioneering fundamental genetic and biochemical work on understanding the mechanisms of DNA transposition. He along with Gerald Fink discovered the mechanism by which yeast Ty1 transposable elements move via an RNA intermediate. He coined the term "retrotransposon" to describe transposable elements that move via this process. These retrotransposons are distantly related to retroviruses such as HIV.

Boeke is currently leading an international team of collaborators in an effort to construct a synthetic version of the entire genome of Baker's Yeast, Saccharomyces cerevisiae. It was reported in March 2014, that Boeke along with this team had synthesized the third smallest chromosome, chromosome III. The synthetic chromosome was designed to be shorter and more stable than the original. The effort to complete all 16 chromosomes of S. cerevisiae is currently underway and is reportedly half complete.

He is one of the co-founders of Genome Project-Write aiming at synthesis of human genome, and leader of the “Dark Matter Project” to begin parsing the function of non-coding DNA.
