= NAS Award in Molecular Biology =

The NAS Award in Molecular Biology is awarded by the U.S. National Academy of Sciences to recognize a recent and significant discovery in molecular biology. The award is restricted to scientists who are citizens of the United States and no older than 50 years at the time of the award. It includes a medal and a monetary prize of US$25,000 and is it is currently supported by Pfizer Inc.

== History ==
The NAS Award in Molecular Biology was first presented in 1962. The inaugural recipient was Marshall Nirenberg, who was recognized for foundational contributions to understanding the molecular basis of protein synthesis. Nirenberg later shared the Nobel Prize in Physiology or Medicine in 1968 with Robert W. Holley and H. Gobind Khorana for their interpretation of the genetic code and its role in protein synthesis.

Since its establishment, the NAS Award in Molecular Biology has frequently anticipated later major scientific honors, as a substantial number of recipients have gone on to receive the National Medal of Science, the Lasker Award, or the Nobel Prize in Physiology or Medicine or Chemistry.

== List of NAS Award in Molecular Biology winners ==
Source: NAS

- 1962 Marshall Nirenberg for his studies of the molecular mechanisms for the biosynthesis of protein.
- 1963 Matthew Meselson for his leading role in developing and applying methods to measure the transmission of genetic information in the cell.
- 1964 Charles Yanofsky for his achievements in demonstrating how changes in the gene produce changes in the way protein is made in the body.
- 1965 Robert Stuart Edgar for his development and application of the method of "conditional lethal mutants" for the analysis of the genetic control of morpho-genesis at the molecular level.
- 1966 Norton D. Zinder for his discovery of RNA bacteriophages, a new class of bacteria-attacking viruses, which have provided researchers with a highly valuable and convenient method of studying fundamental processes in all living cells.
- 1967 Robert W. Holley for his elucidation of the full sequence of nucleotides in the molecule of a soluble RNA.
- 1968 Walter Gilbert for his signal contribution to the understanding of the regulatory mechanisms operative in genetic control of protein synthesis.
- 1969 William B. Wood III for his genetic dissection of the mechanism of assembly of the bacterial virus particle and reconstruction of the virus in vitro.
- 1970 A. Dale Kaiser for his discovery that pure phage lambda DNA can infect susceptible bacterial cells and produce progeny, and for the effect of this discovery on the whole field of bacterial virus genetics.
- 1971 Masayasu Nomura for his studies on the structure and function of ribosomes and their molecular components.
- 1972 Howard M. Temin for his work leading to the discovery of reverse transcription.
- 1973 Donald D. Brown for his studies of the structure, regulation, and evolution of genes in animals, particularly the genes specifying ribosomal RNA in Xenopus and silk fibroin in Bombix.
- 1974 David Baltimore for his distinguished leadership in virus research, and for his discoveries on the reproduction and enzymology of RNA viruses that has greatly advanced the science of molecular biology.
- 1975 Bruce Alberts for the isolation of proteins required for DNA replication and genetic recombination and the elucidation of how they interact with DNA.
- 1976 Daniel Nathans for his innovative use of molecular and cell biological tools to analyze the genome of an oncogenic virus.
- 1977Aaron Shatkin for his contributions to the understanding of eukaryotic, viral, and cellular messenger RNAs.
- 1978 Günter Blobel for elucidating mechanisms of passage of secreted proteins into and across membranes.
- 1979 Mark Ptashne for his outstanding contributions to our understanding of gene regulation through the studies of the virus Lambda.
- 1980 Phillip A. Sharp for his pioneering and continuing contributions to our understanding of messenger RNA biogenesis in mammalian cells.
- 1981 Ronald W. Davis and Gerald Fink for their outstanding contributions to the molecular biology of the simple eukaryote Saccharomyces cerevisiae. Both have opened vistas of genetic analysis by the development of new methods, in particular, the development and utilization of molecular cloning in yeast.
- 1982 Joan A. Steitz for contributing to our understanding of how RNA molecules are recognized by enzymes and discovering the roles played by small ribonucleoprotein molecules in RNA processing.
- 1983 James C. Wang for his ingenious studies of the topological properties of the DNA double helix and his discovery of the important class of enzymes known as DNA topoisomerases.
- 1984 Geoffrey M. Cooper and Robert A. Weinberg for the identification and characterization of cellular oncogenes of human and animal tumors, thereby providing seminal insights into the mechanisms of carcinogenesis.
- 1985 Gerald M. Rubin and Allan C. Spradling for adding a new dimension to eukaryotic genetics and developmental biology by developing a method to introduce and stably integrate cloned genes into the germ cells of living Drosophila.
- 1986 Robert G. Roeder for his pioneering studies of eukaryotic RNA polymerases and the factors that regulate their activity.
- 1987 Thomas R. Cech for the astonishing discovery of RNA-catalyzed self-splicing of introns and the analysis of the chemistry of RNA-catalyzed reactions.
- 1988 H. Robert Horvitz for significant contributions to the genetic analysis of the development of cell lineages in the nematode Caenorhabditis elegans.
- 1989 Kiyoshi Mizuuchi for bringing about remarkable advances in our understanding of transposition and other forms of genetic recombination.
- 1990 Elizabeth H. Blackburn for her discovery of the nature of DNA at the ends of eukaryotic chromosomes and the enzyme that is necessary to complete chromosomal replication.
- 1991 Steven McKnight and Robert Tjian for advancing our understanding of transcriptional regulation by devising novel strategies and applying elegant biochemistry to reveal fundamental mechanisms underlying gene expression and development.
- 1992 Bruce S. Baker and Thomas W. Cline for their creative use of genetics and molecular biology to define how sex is determined in Drosophila. Their experiments have shown how the ratio of sex chromosomes to autosomes can initiate a novel regulatory pathway involving RNA processing.
- 1993 Peter S. Kim for his pathfinding research in structural biology, which has elucidated both the pathway of protein folding and mechanisms of macromolecular recognition.
- 1994 Gerald F. Joyce and Jack W. Szostak for independently developing in vitro evolution of RNA catalysts. Their work produced RNA enzymes with novel specificities, while illuminating our view of natural selection.
- 1995 Daniel E. Gottschling for his elucidation, by experiments elegant in their simplicity, of the relationship between the ends of yeast chromosomes and transcriptional silencing.
- 1996 Michael S. Levine for his insightful contributions to our understanding of gene regulation networks and molecular mechanisms governing the development of organisms with a segmented body plan.
- 1997 Richard H. Scheller and Thomas C. Südhof for their performance of elegant experiments to resolve the molecular components responsible for controlling neurotransmitter vesicle release and chemical communication within the nervous system.
- 1998 Philip Beachy for his studies of a developmental morphogen, its processing and structure, and its covalent attachment to cholesterol.
- 1999 Clifford Tabin for his contributions in analyzing genes that establish asymmetric body patterns and control limb development in vertebrates.
- 2000 Patrick O. Brown for his intellectual leadership in functional genomics, most notably the development of a reliable and accessible DNA microarray system to measure genome-wide gene expression.
- 2001 Erin K. O'Shea for contributions to our understanding of signal transduction, regulation of protein movement into and out of the nucleus, and how phosphorylation controls protein activity.
- 2002 Stephen J. Elledge for his innovative contributions at the forefront of the field of cell cycle checkpoints and his elucidation of pathways and mechanisms involved in DNA damage responses.
- 2003 Andrew Z. Fire and Craig C. Mello for inventing methods to inactivate genes by RNA interference and helping to elucidate their underlying mechanism and biological function.
- 2004 Xiaodong Wang for his biochemical studies of apoptosis which have resolved a molecular pathway leading in and out of the mitochondrion.
- 2005 David Bartel for his discoveries on the repertoire of catalytic RNA and the analysis of micro RNA genes and their targets.
- 2006 Ronald Breaker and Tina M. Henkin for establishing a new mode of regulation of gene expression in which metabolites regulate the activity of their cognate pathways by directly binding to mRNA.
- 2007 Gregory J. Hannon for elucidation of the enzymatic engine for RNA interference.
- 2008 Angelika Amon for groundbreaking studies that have provided insight into the mechanism of the central process of chromosome segregation and the regulation of segregation.
- 2009 Stephen P. Bell for groundbreaking studies illuminating the mechanisms of DNA replication in eukaryotic cells.
- 2010 Jeannie T. Lee by using X-chromosome inactivation as a model system, Lee has made unique contributions to our understanding of epigenetic regulation on a global scale, including the role of long, non-coding RNAs, interchromosomal interactions, and nuclear compartmentalization.
- 2011 James M. Berger for elucidating the structures of topoisomerases and helicases and providing insights into the biochemical mechanisms that mediate the replication and transcription of DNA.
- 2012 Zhijian James Chen for his creative use of elegant biochemistry both in elucidating an unsuspected role for polyubiquitin in a kinase-signaling cascade important for cancer and immunity and in discovering a novel link between innate immunity and a mitochondrial membrane protein that forms prion-like polymers to trigger antiviral responses.
- 2013 Sue Biggins (2013) for the isolation and in vitro characterization of a functional kinetochore complex, and for the use of that system to explore kinetochore function.
- 2014 David M. Sabatini for his discovery of components and regulators of the mTOR kinase pathway and his elucidation of the important roles of this signaling pathway in nutrient sensing, cell physiology, and cancer.
- 2015 Xiaowei Zhuang for the development of a high-resolution microscopy method (STORM) that allows molecular-scale resolution, by bypassing the ‘diffraction limit’ that has long shackled light microscopy. In addition, she developed the photo-switchable fluorescent dyes that have made this method a powerful and critical tool in many areas of biological research and neuroscience.
- 2016 Dianne K. Newman for her discovery of microbial mechanisms underlying geologic processes, thereby launching the field of molecular geomicrobiology and transforming our understanding of how the Earth evolved.
- 2017 Rodolphe Barrangou for his landmark discovery that bacteria have adaptive immune systems, groundbreaking work that catalyzed the manipulation of the CRISPR-Cas9 pathway for genome engineering.
- 2018 Howard Y. Chang for the discovery of long noncoding RNAs and the invention of genomic technologies.
- 2019 David Reich for creative use of molecular biology to trace ancient human migrations, reveal how population mixtures shaped modern humans, and illuminate disease risk factors across populations.
- 2020 Hashim Al-Hashimi for pioneering studies into RNA and DNA function on the atomic level.
- 2021 Joseph Mougous, for his discoveries relating to the toxins and molecular machines mediating antagonism between bacteria, and his demonstration that such processes are fundamental in shaping microbial communities.
- 2022 Carrie Partch for elucidating the protein-based signaling mechanisms and structural assemblies that give rise to circadian rhythms.
- 2023 Jason McLellan for pioneering work in the molecular and structural biology of viral surface proteins.
- 2024 Shu-ou Shan for elucidating how newly synthesized proteins are transported to cell membranes, advancing our understanding of molecular mechanisms in complex biological pathways.
- 2025 Eric P. Skaar for pioneering work at the intersection of nutrition and infectious diseases.
- 2026 Philip J. Kranzusch for elucidating the evolutionary origins of human innate immune signaling pathways in bacterial antiviral defense.

== See also ==
- List of biology awards
