= Charles Zuker =

American biologist

Charles S. Zuker
- Born: 1957 (age 68–69)
- Education: MIT
- Scientific career
- Fields: Neuroscience
- Workplaces: UC San Diego 1987–2009, Columbia University 2009–present
- Doctoral advisor: Harvey Lodish

Charles S. Zuker (born 1957) is a Chilean molecular geneticist and neurobiologist. Zuker is a Professor of Biochemistry & Molecular Biophysics and a Professor of Neuroscience at Columbia University. He has been an Investigator of the Howard Hughes Medical Institute since 1989.

== Education and Academic life ==
Zuker was born in Arica, Chile in 1957. He attended el Colegio San Marcos in Arica, and later el Colegio San Ignacio in Santiago. In 1973, he moved to Viña del Mar to study Biology at the Universidad Catolica de Valparaiso in Chile, where he worked as an undergraduate student in the labs of Roberto Gonzalez and Sergio Marshall. He then went to graduate school at MIT where he obtained his Ph.D. with Harvey Lodish. Zuker did his postdoctoral studies at the University of California, Berkeley with Gerald Rubin. In 1987, he accepted a position as an assistant professor at the University of California, San Diego. In 1989 he was given tenure and appointed an Investigator of the Howard Hughes Medical Institute. Prior to moving to Columbia University in 2009, he was the Kevin and Tamara Kinsella Chair of Neurobiology and Distinguished Professor at the University of California, San Diego, School of Medicine.

In addition to his academic appointments at the University of California and at Columbia University, Zuker was a Senior Fellow at the Janelia Research Campus from 2009-2017.

== Career ==
His lab, in collaboration with Nick Ryba at the NIH, have transformed our understanding of mammalian taste. Beginning in the late 1990s Zuker and Ryba, along with other labs, identified and characterized the receptors and the cells mediating each of the five basic taste modalities: sweet, sour, bitter, salty and umami. They then demonstrated that individual taste receptor cells are tuned to encode individual taste qualities, and are hardwired to trigger innate behaviors (like attraction to sweet and aversion to bitters).

In 2003, Zuker and Ryba were the first to use targeted expression of a novel receptor (RASSL) to activate a neural circuit in a behaving mouse, and profoundly changed its behavior: By expressing RASSL in sweet or bitter taste receptor cells they could drive the animal to be attracted, or averse, to the otherwise tasteless RASSL ligand.

In a set of milestone studies exploring the peripheral and central coding of taste, and combining molecular genetics, physiology, imaging, animal behavior, and optical control of neural circuits, Zuker and collaborators identified the circuits driving responses to the different taste stimuli, and showed that by manipulating the neurons representing sweet and bitter taste in the brain they could directly control an animal’s internal representation, sensory perception, and behavioral actions.

Zuker’s laboratory has also helped uncover the fundamental difference between liking sweet (i.e. the role of the taste system, activated by both sugars and artificial sweeteners) and wanting sugar (i.e. the strong desire for sugar). They showed that, in addition to the tongue, sugar acts in the gut to activate a novel neural circuit that communicates to the brain the presence of sugar. This gut-to-brain communication axis (also-known-as the gut-brain axis) is not activated by artificial sweeteners and functions as the principal conduit driving preference for sugar.

More recently, Zuker has been a pioneer in the biology of the body-brain axis. His recent work defined the neural basis for the insatiable appetite for fat, and dissected the brain circuit that detects intestinal fat to promote consummatory responses. In a new study published in 2024, the Zuker lab characterized a brain center modulating body immune responses (the so called Neuroimmune Axis). This new work opened up an entirely new and unexplored window into how the brain senses and interacts with the immune system, and demonstrated how the brain exerts exquisite control over the immune state.

Prior to working on mammalian taste, his lab focused on signal transduction pathways in Drosophila melanogaster (fruit fly), including vision, mechanotransduction and thermosensation.

== Honors ==
2001 Elected Member, American Academy of Arts and Sciences

2004 Elected Member, National Academy of Sciences

2006 Elected member, National Academy of Medicine

2014 Elected Fellow, American Association for the Advancement of Science

2024 Howard Taylor Ricketts Award

2026 Wolf Prize in Medicine

== Notable Papers ==
- Juen, Z., Lu, Z., Yu, R., Chang, A.N., Wang, B., Fitzpatrick, A.W.P., Zuker, C.S. The structure of human sweetness. Cell 188, 1-13 (2025).
- Jin H, Li M, Jeong E, Castro-Martinez F, Zuker C.S. A body–brain circuit that regulates body inflammatory responses. Nature 630, 695–703 (2024).
- Li M, Tan H-E, Lu Z, Tsang K, Chung A, Zuker C.S. Gut–Brain Circuits for Fat Preference. Nature 610, 722-730 (2022).
- Tan H-E, Sisti A, Jin H, Vignovich M, Villavicencio M, Tsang K, Goffer Y, Zuker C.S. The gut–brain axis mediates sugar preference. Nature 580, 511-516 (2020).
- Zhang J, Jin H, Zhang W, Ding C, O'Keeffe S, Ye M, Zuker C.S. Sour Sensing from the Tongue to the Brain. Cell 179, 392-402 (2019).
- Wang L, Gillis-Smith S, Peng Y, Zhang J, Chen X, Salzman CD, Ryba NJ, Zuker C.S. The coding of valence and identity in the mammalian taste system. Nature 558, 127-131 (2018).
- Lee H, Macpherson LJ, Parada CA, Zuker C.S., Ryba N.J. Rewiring the taste system. Nature 548, 330-333 (2017).
- Peng, Y., Gillis-Smith, S., Jin, H., Tränkner, D., Ryba, N.J. and Zuker, C.S. Sweet and bitter taste in the brain of awake behaving animals. Nature 527, 512–515 (2015).
- Barretto, R.P., Gillis-Smith, S., Chandrashekar, J., Yarmolinsky, D.A., Schnitzer, M.J., Ryba, N.J. and Zuker, C.S. The neural representation of taste quality at the periphery. Nature 517, 373–376 (2015).
- Chen, X., Gabitto, M., Peng, Y., Ryba, N.J. and Zuker, C.S. A gustotopic map of taste qualities in the mammalian brain. Science 333, 1262–1266 (2011).
- Chandrashekar, J., Kuhn, C., Oka, Y., Yarmolinsky, D.A., Hummler, E., Ryba, N.J. and Zuker, C.S. The cells and peripheral representation of sodium taste in mice. Nature 464, 297–301 (2010).
- Huang, A.L., Chen, X., Hoon, M.A., Chandrashekar, J., Guo, W., Tränkner, D., Ryba, N.J. and Zuker C.S. The cells and logic for mammalian sour taste detection. Nature 442, 934–938 (2006).
- Mueller, K.L., Hoon, M.A., Erlenbach, I., Chandrashekar, J., Zuker, C.S. and Ryba, N.J. The receptors and coding logic for bitter taste. Nature 434, 225–229 (2005).
- Zhao, G.Q., Zhang, Y., Hoon, M.A., Chandrashekar, J., Erlenbach, I., Ryba, NJ. and Zuker, C.S. The receptors for mammalian sweet and umami taste. Cell 115, 255–266 (2003).
- Nelson, G., Chandrashekar, J., Hoon, M.A., Feng, L., Zhao, G., Ryba, N.J. and Zuker, C.S. An amino-acid taste receptor. Nature 416, 199–202 (2002).
- Nelson, G., Hoon, M.A., Chandrashekar, J., Zhang, Y., Ryba, N.J. and Zuker, C.S. Mammalian sweet taste receptors. Cell 106, 381–390 (2001).
