= Havasupai Tribe v. the Arizona Board of Regents =

2010 American court case

Havasupai Tribe v. the Arizona Board of Regents was a court case involving the American Indian Havasupai tribe and the Arizona State University Board of Regents.

Between 1990 and 1994, John Martin and Therese Markow collected DNA samples from 400 members of the Havasupai tribe for a diabetes project being conducted by Arizona State University (ASU). The Havasupai are an American Indian tribe who have lived in the Grand Canyon and have high rates of type II diabetes. Because of a desire to better understand the high rates of diabetes, members of the tribe willingly gave blood samples to ASU under the assumption that it would be used for genetic testing. In 2003, a member of the Havasupai tribe named Carletta Tilousi discovered that the blood samples given to ASU were not being used for diabetes testing. Instead, they were being used for a multitude of different studies covering schizophrenia, inbreeding, and migration, to which the Havasupai had not consented.

In 2004, the Havasupai tribe filed a lawsuit against the Arizona State of Regents for misuse of their DNA samples as well as a lack of informed information regarding the intentions of ASU. In 2010, Havasupai Tribe v. Arizona Board of Regents was decided in favor of the Havasupai tribe. Although the outcome did not set any legal precedent, the tribe was given $700,000 in compensation, and their blood samples were returned. The return of the samples was the most important part for the tribe because blood and DNA are sacred material for Havasupai culture and personhood.

This case set an unofficial precedent for informed consent and brought to light indigenous vulnerability. It also forced researchers to be more transparent about the vast possibilities of information that can be gathered from DNA. Cultural implications for tribes were also brought to light through this study because of the effects this case had on the cultural traditions of the Havasupai people. Overall, bioethics were questioned with this trial, and it created a mistrust between Native American communities and the medical world. Although no legal precedent was set, this case brought to light the need for ethical research practices especially with regard to Native American communities.

== Arizona State University research ==
The research project at Arizona State University began when the tribe approached a professor at the university. John Martin, who the tribe had already established a trusting relationship with, was contacted by the tribe about their growing concerns around the rising diabetes rates among the tribe. A blood sample collected from members of the tribe was to be used to research the possible genetic link to diabetes. The tribe understood that the blood sample was only going to be used for the research of this link. Martin and fellow professor Therese Ann Markow, who had previously done work in research of other disorders, were tasked with working on the research project together. Markow expressed interest in expanding the project to include research into mental diseases; however, Martin held the belief that the tribe would have no interest in this additional research.

Before the blood could be collected, the university had a broad consent statement signed by tribe members who would be donating their blood to the research project. Most of the tribe members involved were not high school graduates and thus English was their second language. As a result, these members were under the impression that the consent statement they signed was just concerned with the diabetes research that was originally planned.

The Havasupai tribe had noticed an increase in the number of diabetes cases among members, and reached out to ASU to find out if there was a connection like several other native tribes across the United States have found. They were looking for a genetic link to Type 2 Diabetes (T2D), a disease that is highly prevalent in Native American populations. T2D is the most common serious disease found in Native American tribes today, rates of which among tribes have gone up drastically since World War II. Through research, a genetic connection has been found in several tribes relating to the occurrence of T2D among the native American population. At the conclusion of the research project at ASU, the researchers were not able to find a similar genetic link to T2D that has been found in other native tribes in the United States. After they concluded this, the research team continued with their research using the tribe member’s blood samples to research other disorders without the tribe's knowledge. The project began as a way to help a tribe that had a strong relationship with a professor at ASU, but it turned into a way for researchers, not just those from ASU, to study other medical disorders without having to face the issue of having to get new samples. Much of the additional research that was performed on the blood samples goes against tribal beliefs that were inherited from their ancestors. The Havasupai Tribe believed that a deceased member of the tribe would not be able to rest after death if any part of their physical body was not buried with them. As a result, the tribe expected to get back the blood samples that they had donated.

== Court case ==
Havasupai Tribe of Havasupai Reservation v. Arizona Board of Regents was brought to court on April 20, 2010. It was discovered that the DNA samples extracted from the Havasupai tribe members that were initially intended to go towards research regarding the genetic linkage to type 2 diabetes in the 1990s, were being used for additional studies. This case was brought to court by Carletta Tilousi, who had discovered that the DNA samples were being used for additional tests by third-party groups without the tribe's consent. In court, the Arizona Board of Regents emphasized how the defense of the Havasupai Tribe failed to bring upon their case prior to it being brought upon the court. The Havasupai Tribe had stated four separate claims; however, they were found by ASU to be past the 180-day claim period, making the claims late. The ASU defense stated that aside from the claims being filed late against ASU, the Havasupai Tribe did not support the claims with facts that portray the emotional distress or physical harm caused by the research. The main defendants on the Arizona Board side were individuals of the Arizona State research teams. The court determined there to be eight cases of misconduct carried out by the researchers of Arizona State University and Markow, as their research went beyond that in which the Havasupai tribe had consented to. These cases included the disclosure of private info in regard to the tribe's blood samples, misrepresentation of the Havasupai tribe, conversion, invasion of privacy, emotional distress, violation of civil rights, lack of informed consent, and overall negligence.

This court case resulted in many long-term effects as the Havasupai tribe gained and lost a variety of factors throughout this time period. Havasupai tribe members whose DNA was used for unconsented testing were rewarded with $700,000 compensation at court. Additionally, the blood samples were returned to the tribe members along with a detailed list of all the people who had received their blood samples throughout the time of the research. This was an important day for the Havasupai tribe members as biological matter such as DNA is sacred to Native Americans. Blood is crucial to each individual and signifies several spiritual and cultural roles within the Native American community. It was also stated that Arizona State University was to help the Havasupai tribe in extending their educational programs, health, nutrition, and economic progression. One of the main factors that was lost by the Havasupai tribe following this court case in 2010, was the idea of medical safety and security. Many Havasupai tribe members feared seeking medical attention after this court case, as they did not want to give their DNA through blood samples out of fear that additional research would be conducted.

== Effects on the Havasupai ==
Carletta Tilousi is a member of the Havasupai. She served as the White House's Environmental Justice Advisor. She also serves as an ambassador of environmental and justice issues for the Havasupai tribe. In 2003, she was the one to discover that the researchers at Arizona State University were using the DNA samples to study other health related topics such as schizophrenia, ethnic migration, and population breeding of the tribe members, instead of just the original diabetes-related research. She made it clear that members of the tribe, herself included, would never have consented to this kind of research and the use of the genetic material was without their consent. After finding out the researchers at Arizona State were using the genetic material for these studies without consent, she informed the Havasupai tribe members.

After the Havasupai tribe members discovered the use of their DNA material being used by ASU researchers, they issued a banishment order in May 2003. The members expressed the distrust they already felt for researchers, and the injustice they felt from a lack of consent. Many American tribes, including Havasupai, believe DNA is not just an object, but a sacred part of their personhood. The members also expressed that topics such as mental health and inbreeding were taboo subjects so they were never discussed amongst members, and they would never consent to their DNA being used for research on those subjects. The tribe decided to pursue legal justice and Havasupai Tribe v. Arizona Board of Regents began.

The case led many scientists to debate over the right way to arrange informed consent with participants of any study. Many scientists say that it should not be necessary to receive informed consent for every time a DNA study is conducted. David Karp, associate professor of internal medicine at the University of Texas Southwestern Medical Center stated, "Everyone wants to be open and transparent [...] the question is, how far do we have to go? Do you have to create some massive database of people’s wishes for their DNA specimens?" Many scientists agreed with Karp, mentioning that once written consent is given for DNA use, they should not have to contact the individual every couple of years for a new research study. Therese Markow, a lead researcher for the genetic project, said, "I was doing good research". She believed her research was important and that informed consent for additional use of the DNA was not required.

== Effects on medical research ==
Havasupai Tribe v. Arizona Board of Regents has affected various areas of research, from social psychology to medical research and the interactions of law and medicine. One of the most important effects of this case was the precedent set in the topic of genetic research. Although the Havasupai tribe was offered monetary compensation and the return of the blood samples, it was never officially decided in court. Consequently, Havasupai set no legal precedent pertaining to the secondary use of medical samples or informed consent procedures. However, there were many informal precedents set through this case. One of the most prevalent changes was the further development of long-term distrust of medical researchers in the Native American population.

This distrust of medical researchers and practitioners throughout the Native American population, more specifically the Havasupai, has led to the unwillingness of many minority groups to participate in medical research. Since the Havasupai case, many tribes have even prohibited participation in medical research in order to protect themselves and their cultural beliefs and values. Widespread American Indian establishment of tribal health research and institutional review boards means formal committees will now oversee medical research within these communities. This could cause problems if it results in further delays in medical research within the native population, which is already decades behind white and westernized medical research. Because of this, it is important that the relationship between medical researchers and indigenous populations is mended in the near future.

In addition to this distrust of researchers and medical practitioners, the Havasupai case emphasizes the importance of informed consent and debriefing in all research projects, especially those pertaining to health and the human body. The United States Food and Drug Administration (FDA) defines informed consent as providing a research participant with the entire purpose of the research, in understandable terms, while clearly defining the individual’s role and rights. While a similar idea, debriefing is the act of informing participants about a study after they have participated in it. Usually, these types of studies involve deception, or intentionally misleading subjects for the purpose of gathering accurate data. However, even when debriefing is used, it is also necessary to gather informed consent from all participants, and only mislead participants when absolutely necessary for the research - this is most often used in psychological research studies. In the Havasupai case, researchers from Arizona State University failed to gather informed consent and debrief their participants following the study, which are major ethical violations in medical research.

Lastly, this case emphasized the importance of providing proper education and protection to vulnerable populations, instead of exploiting them. Author Nanibaa' Garrison argues that there needs to be increased levels of education on informed consent for both researchers and study participants. This way, individuals will be more aware of their rights and less vulnerable to potential exploitation. Similarly, various other authors and academics have argued for increased justice and equity in genetic research involving indigenous populations. One of the first steps to implementing this would be acknowledging the legal implications and precedents that resulted from Havasupai v. Arizona Board of Regents. Katherine Drabiak-Syed, for example, argues for the recognition of legitimate cultural harms in research, and for processes to be implemented to avoid these injustices in the future. Lauren Kuntz similarly argues for increased cultural sensitivity when designing research on minority populations. And finally, David S. Jones argues that the ongoing persistence of American Indian health disparities in the United States signify social injustice for these populations. According to these scholars, it is necessary that medical researchers begin to put in place procedures that minimize the exploitation and abuse of native populations during studies.

== Studies with similar outcomes ==
While there are numerous academic and social leaders urging for increased equity in genetic research involving indigenous populations, there are various studies in the past and present that continue to exploit these populations without repercussions. The first of these studies is looked at in Moore v. Regents of the University of California, a 1990 court case in which the Supreme Court of California ruled that individuals are not allowed to share profit from research that was performed on their own bodily materials. In this case, a patient who had undergone leukemia treatment at the University of California claimed that his physician used blood samples in "potentially lucrative medical research" without the patient's explicit permission.

Norman-Bloodsaw v. Lawrence Berkeley Laboratory was a similar 1998 case in which the Lawrence Berkeley National Laboratory tested the blood and urine of employees for "intimate medical conditions" such as syphilis, sickle cell anemia, and pregnancy without the consent of the individuals. These cases each looked at the importance of informed consent and the secondary use of laboratory samples; however no formal precedent was put in place to prohibit medical researchers from exploiting vulnerable populations.
