= Mary Gehring =

American plant biologist

- Citizenship: American
- Education: Williams College, University of California, Berkeley (PhD) 2005
- Occupations: American plant biologist, Epigeneticist
- Employer: University of California, Berkeley
- Known for: Associate professor
- Notable work: Published extensively on genomic imprinting and demethylation in Arabidopsis thaliana, Led a laboratory focused on epigenetics at the Whitehead Institute

Mary Gehring is an American plant biologist and epigeneticist who has published extensively on genomic imprinting and demethylation in Arabidopsis thaliana. She has led a laboratory focused on epigenetics at the Whitehead Institute since 2010 and is an associate professor in the biology department at MIT. Gehring graduated from Williams College and received her PhD in 2005 from University of California, Berkeley, where she worked with Robert L. Fischer.

Gehring did postdoctoral research with Steven Henikoff at the Fred Hutchinson Cancer Research Center and was a Pew Scholar in the Biomedical Sciences. She was chosen as one of Cell's 40 under 40 for the journal's 40th anniversary.

She cites Marie Curie as the one scientist who most fascinated her, and credits "[w]anting to help feed the world" as the inspiration for getting into plant biology.
