= Robert Stuart Edgar =

American geneticist

- Born: September 15, 1930
- Died: February 1, 2016 (aged 85)
- Education: McGill University, University of Rochester
- Known for: Mechanisms by which a bacterial virus assembles its component parts into a functional virus particle
- Awards: NAS Award in Molecular Biology
- Scientific career
- Fields: Genetics
- Institutions: California Institute of Technology, University of California, Santa Cruz

Robert Stuart Edgar (September 15, 1930 – February 1, 2016) was a geneticist.

Upon graduating from McGill University, Edgar pursued graduate study at the University of Rochester. After completing his doctorate, he began teaching and doing research at the California Institute of Technology in 1957. While at Caltech he carried out research that explained the mechanisms by which bacterial viruses assemble their component parts into a functional virus particle. As part of this research he developed the important experimental strategy of using "conditional" mutants as an experimental tool to elucidate complex biological phenomena.

The isolation of conditional lethal mutants of the bacterial virus T4 (bacteriophage T4) during 1962–1964 by members of the phage group at the California Institute of Technology provided an opportunity to study the function of virtually all of the genes that are essential for growth of the bacteriophage under laboratory conditions. At the time, this was the most comprehensive analysis of the essential genes of any particular organism. One class of conditional lethal mutants, referred to as temperature-sensitive mutants, was obtained by Robert Edgar and Ilga Lielausis. Studies of these mutants led to considerable insight into numerous fundamental biologic problems. Thus understanding was gained on the functions and interactions of the proteins employed in the machinery of DNA replication, DNA repair and DNA recombination, and on how viruses are assembled from protein and nucleic acid components (molecular morphogenesis).

During this time Edgar also became interested in the processes of human communication and brought the practice of T-groups and Encounter sessions to the Caltech Biology Department.

Edgar joined the University of California, Santa Cruz faculty in 1970, where he taught and carried out research for twenty years until retirement in 1990. At UCSC he was the founding provost of Kresge College, where he helped design the campus in the style of an Italian mountain village and the student living quarters as apartments rather than the traditional dormitory bedrooms. Academically, he created programs that offered students a much greater role in the planning of the curriculum and the design of their major fields of study. After serving as Kresge provost through 1975, he became a full time member of the Biology Department at UCSC where he taught Genetics and initiated a research program involving the genetics of the roundworm C. elegans, which helped develop this organism into a primary research tool in molecular genetics, development, and neurobiology. He also founded the Worm-Breeders Gazette, which provided a rapid mechanism of communication among researchers using this organism in the days before the internet.

He received the NAS Award in Molecular Biology in 1965, and was granted membership into the National Academy of Sciences itself in 2007. He was a Guggenheim Fellow for the academic year 1974–1975. He was also a fellow of the American Academy of Arts and Sciences.
