= Hashim Al-Hashimi =

American biochemist

Hashim Al-Hashimi is a professional biochemist and professor of biochemistry and chemistry at Columbia University. He received the prestigious NAS Award in Molecular Biology in 2020. He was a professor at Duke University for several years before being recruited to Columbia University.
