= Whitehead Institute =

Non-profit biomedical research institute

Coordinates: 42.363471°N 71.089361°W

Whitehead Institute for Biomedical Research
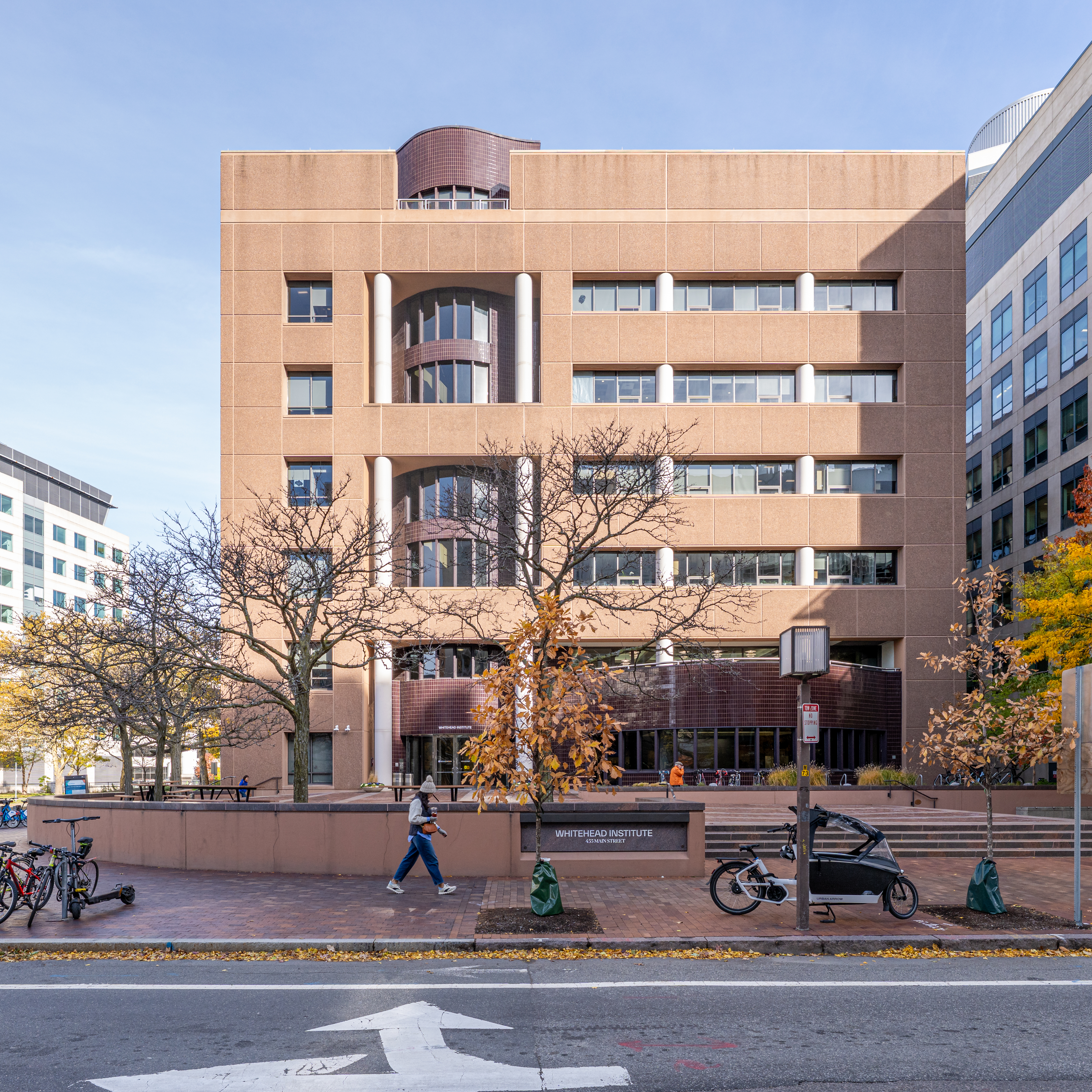
- The Whitehead Institute for Biomedical Research
- Established: 1982; 44 years ago
- Research type: A scientific community exploring biology's most fundamental questions for the betterment of human health
- Field of research: Cancer, stem cell, immunology, developmental biology, regenerative medicine, genetics, genomics
- Director: Ruth Lehmann
- Endowment: $715.8 million (2024)
- Affiliations: Massachusetts Institute of Technology
- Website: wi.mit.edu

Whitehead Institute for Biomedical Research is a non-profit research institute located in Cambridge, Massachusetts, United States, that is dedicated to improving human health through basic biomedical research. It was founded as a fiscally independent entity from the Massachusetts Institute of Technology (MIT), where its 19 members all hold faculty appointments in the MIT Department of Biology or the MIT Department of Bioengineering. As of 2025, Ruth Lehmann is its director, succeeding David C. Page in 2020.

== History ==
Whitehead Institute was founded in 1982 by industrialist and philanthropist Edwin C. "Jack" Whitehead (1920–1992), who sought to establish a research institute "dedicated to improving human health through basic biomedical science". Whitehead believed that while such an institution should be closely affiliated with an academic institution, it should remain wholly independent and self-governing. In David Baltimore (1975 Nobel Laureate in Physiology or Medicine), Whitehead found a partner who agreed that this approach would create an "optimum environment for basic research". As Whitehead Institute's founding directors, Baltimore handpicked Harvey Lodish, and Robert Weinberg from MIT, Gerald Fink from Cornell University, and Rudolf Jaenisch from University of Hamburg, Germany, to be Whitehead Institute's founders. This group then identified promising younger scientists to be the first generation of Whitehead members; and they established the Whitehead Fellows Program as a vehicle for accelerating the careers of highly promising young investigators.

Less than a decade after its founding, the Institute for Scientific Information in Philadelphia identified Whitehead as the top research institution in the world in molecular biology and genetics, based on the impact of its scientific publications. Whitehead Institute's Center for Genome Research (CGR) became the single largest contributor to the Human Genome Project, and reportedly contributed one-third of the human genome sequence announced in June 2000.

In 2004 the CGR formed the independent Broad Institute of MIT and Harvard, of which then-Whitehead Member Eric Lander was named Founding Director and President.

Whitehead Institute's influence continues - over a 10-year period, papers published by Whitehead scientists had more impact in molecular biology and genetics than those from any of the 15 leading research universities and life sciences institutes in the United States. Training and education is integral to Whitehead Institute's mission and approximately 300 undergraduates, graduate students, post-doctoral researchers, and visiting scientists are integrally engaged in its research programs. Four times since 2009, the Whitehead Institute has been ranked first as the Best Place to Work for Postdocs in USA by The Scientist magazine.

Today, Whitehead scientists run research programs in cancer biology, developmental biology, genetics and genomics, metabolism, neurodevelopment and neurodegenerative disease, and regenerative medicine. In addition, numerous biotech companies have been launched by Whitehead Members or based on intellectual property developed at the institute, such as Alnylam Pharmaceuticals, Sanofi Genzyme, Ironwood Pharmaceuticals, Rubius Therapeutics, and Verastem.

In 2019, according to the NACUBO report, the institute had an endowment of $527.9 million.

== Faculty ==
The Whitehead Institute lists its research faculty as Members and Fellows (see below).

As of July 2026, its Members were:

- David Bartel
- Iain Cheeseman
- Olivia Corradin
- Gerald Fink (emeritus)
- Mary Gehring
- Siniša Hrvatin
- Rudolf Jaenisch
- Ankur Jain
- Ruth Lehmann
- Pulin Li
- Harvey Lodish
- Sebastian Lourido
- David C. Page
- Peter W. Reddien
- Zuri Sullivan
- Ron Vale
- Robert Weinberg
- Jonathan Weissman
- Yukiko Yamashita
- Richard A. Young

=== Fellows Program ===
In addition to member-led labs, the Whitehead Fellows Program, established in 1984, provides an opportunity for highly accomplished recent PhDs and MDs to direct their own labs as Principal Investigators, rather than work in a senior researcher's lab as a traditional postdoctoral researcher. Fellows receive dedicated lab space and funds for equipment, lab operations, salary, and core staffing. More than a dozen similar programs have since been established around the country, including those at the University of California/San Francisco, Carnegie Institution, and Cold Spring Harbor Laboratory.

As of July 2026, the institute listed the following Fellows:

- Lindsey Backman
- Allison Hamilos
- Tobiloba Oni
- Aditya Raguram
- Na Sun, AI Fellow

Past Whitehead Fellows include George Q. Daley, Dean of Harvard Medical School; Angelika Amon, the late MIT professor and cancer researcher; Kathleen Rubins, NASA astronaut and space biologist; Stanford University professor Peter S. Kim, who was the former President of Merck Research Laboratories (MRL); Kipp Weiskopf, who studies activation of myeloid cells in tumors to treat cancer.

== See also ==
- Broad Institute
- Salk Institute
- Cold Spring Harbor Laboratory
