= Gerald M. Rubin =

American biotechnologist (born 1950)

Gerald Rubin
- Born: Gerald Mayer Rubin; 1950 (age 75–76); Boston, Massachusetts
- Education: MIT (BS); University of Cambridge (Ph.D)
- Awards: Wiley Prize 2026; Gruber Prize in Neuroscience 2024; Newcomb Cleveland Prize 1983 & 2000; George W. Beadle Award 2003; Member of the National Academy of Sciences 1987; Genetics Society of America Medal 1986; NAS Award in Molecular Biology1985
- Scientific career
- Fields: Genetics; Neuroscience
- Workplaces: Janelia Research Campus; Howard Hughes Medical Institute; Stanford University; University of California, Berkeley; MRC Laboratory of Molecular Biology
- Thesis: Studies on 5.8S ribosomal RNA (1974)
- Doctoral advisor: Sydney Brenner
- Website: www.hhmi.org/scientists/gerald-m-rubin

Gerald Mayer Rubin (born 1950) is an American biologist, notable for pioneering the use of transposable P elements in genetics, and for leading the public project to sequence the Drosophila melanogaster genome. Related to his genomics work, Rubin's lab is notable for development of genetic and genomics tools and studies of signal transduction and gene regulation. Rubin also served as a vice president of the Howard Hughes Medical Institute (2003–2020) and founding executive director of its Janelia Research Campus.

== Education and early life ==
Rubin was born in Boston, Massachusetts, in 1950, attending the Boston Latin School. Rubin completed his undergraduate degree in biology at MIT, working at Cold Spring Harbor Laboratory during the summer. He completed his Ph.D. at the University of Cambridge, working at the Laboratory of Molecular Biology in 1974, for studies on 5.8S ribosomal RNA supervised by Sydney Brenner.

== Career and research ==
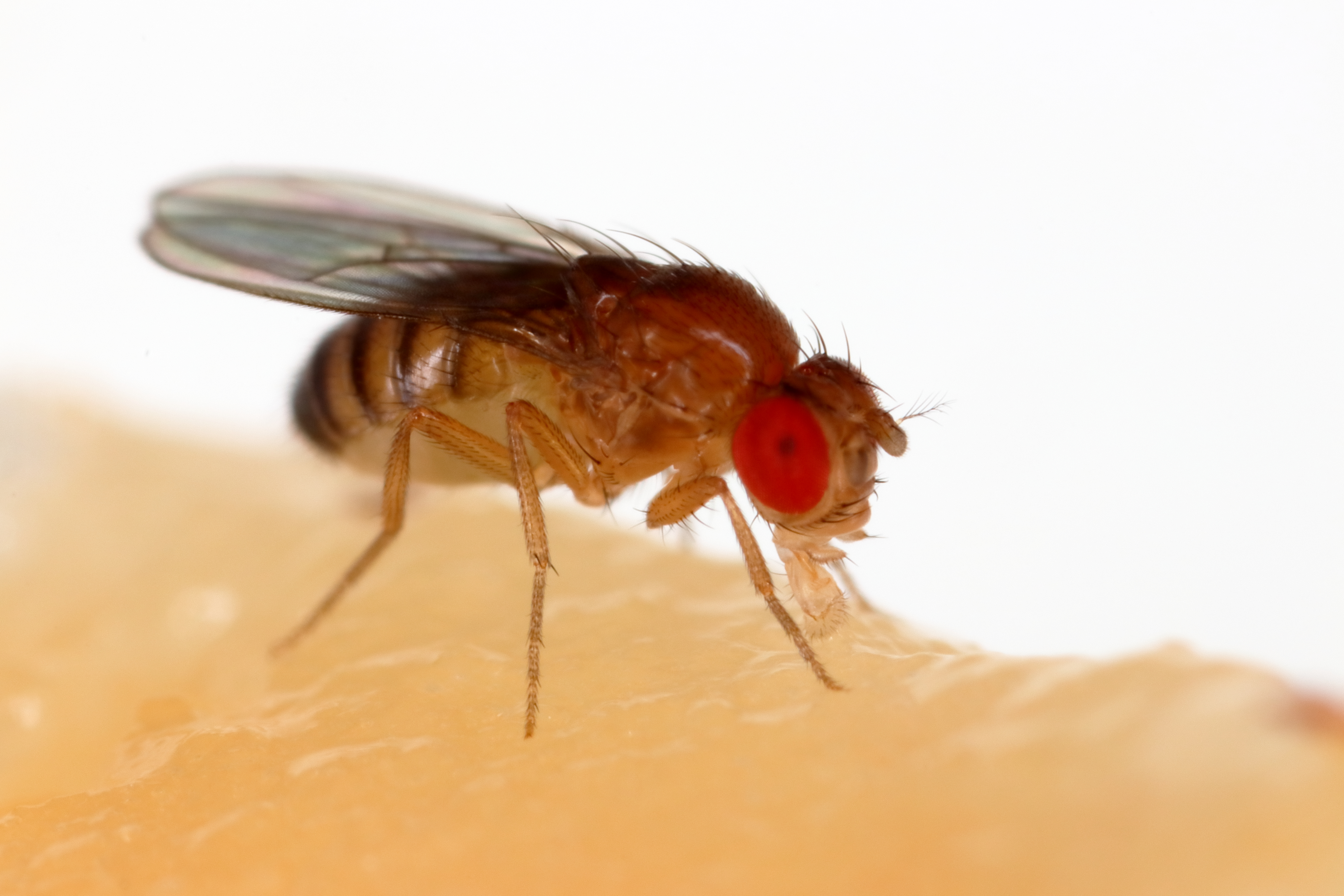
Drosophila Melanogaster, the object of Rubin's science

Following his PhD, Rubin did postdoctoral research at Stanford University with David Hogness.

Rubin's first faculty position was at Harvard Medical School, followed by the Carnegie Institution of Washington; in 1983 he accepted an appointment as the John D. MacArthur Professor of Genetics at the University of California, Berkeley. He was appointed a Howard Hughes Medical Investigator in 1987. He is currently the MacArthur Professor of Genetics emeritus, Genomics and Development, in Berkeley's Department of Molecular and Cell Biology, and a Senior Group Leader at the Janelia Research Campus.

As the director of the Berkeley Drosophila Genome Project, he led the public effort to sequence Drosophila melanogaster (fruit fly). As Vice President of the Howard Hughes Medical Institute, Rubin led the development of HHMI's Janelia Research Campus, an independent biomedical research institute in Virginia. While at Janelia Research Campus, he led the effort to complete the first Drosophila connectome.

His lab is particularly known for its development of genomics tools, studies of gene regulation and other genome-wide research, neuroanatomy, and neurogenetics.

He was one of the three scientific founders of Exelixis in 1994; the company's original business plan was to exploit genomic research in Drosophila and other model organism to discover biological targets that could be used in drug discovery.

== Awards and honours ==
Rubin has won numerous awards including:

- 1971 - Phi Beta Kappa
- 1971 – Phi Lambda Epsilon
- 1971–1973 – United States Churchill Foundation Fellow
- 1971–1974 – National Science Foundation (NSF), predoctoral Fellow
- 1974–1976 – Helen Hay Whitney Fellow
- 1983 – AAAS-Newcomb Cleveland Prize (with Allan C. Spradling for their papers describing germ-line transformation of Drosophila)
- 1983 – Co-winner, Passano Foundation Young Scientist Award
- 1985 – American Chemical Society Eli Lilly Award in Biological Chemistry
- 1985 – Co-winner, National Academy of Sciences U.S. Steel Foundation Award in Molecular Biology
- 1986 – Genetics Society of America Medal
- 1987 – Member of the National Academy of Sciences USA
- 1992 – Fellow of the American Association for the Advancement of Science
- 1992 – Fellow, American Academy of Arts and Sciences
- 1992 – Fellow, American Academy of Microbiology
- 1993 – Howard Taylor Ricketts Award from The University of Chicago
- 2000 – AAAS-Newcomb Cleveland Prize, AAAS (with Craig Venter, Mark Adams, and Susan Celniker) for his March 24, 2000, review paper on sequencing the Drosophila genome
- 2002 – Member, Institute of Medicine
- 2003 – George W. Beadle Medal (with Allan C. Spradling)
- 2006 – R&D Magazine Scientist of the Year 2006
- 2007 – Foreign Member, Royal Society (UK)
- 2017 – Member, European Molecular Biology Organization
- 2024 – Gruber Prize in Neuroscience (with Cornelia Bargmann)
- 2026 – Wiley Prize in Biomedical Sciences.
