= Tania A. Baker =

American biochemist

- Education: University of Wisconsin–Madison (B.S., 1983); Stanford University (Ph.D., 1988)
- Known for: Clp/HSP1000 ATPases
- Scientific career
- Fields: Biochemistry
- Workplaces: Massachusetts Institute of Technology
- Doctoral advisor: Arthur Kornberg

Tania Ann Baker is an American biochemist who is a Professor of Biology at the Massachusetts Institute of Technology and formerly the head of the Department of Biology. She earned her B.S. in Biochemistry from University of Wisconsin–Madison and her Ph.D. in Biochemistry from Stanford University under the guidance of Arthur Kornberg. She joined the MIT faculty in 1992 and her research is focused on the mechanisms and regulation of DNA transposition and protein chaperones. She is a member of the National Academy of Sciences, fellow of the American Academy of Arts and Sciences, and has been a Howard Hughes Medical Institute (HHMI) investigator since 1994.

== Education ==
Tania Baker started her major research when she became a graduate student at Stanford University. When she arrived at Stanford, there had already been work done to isolate 25 different enzymes and proteins. It had been determined that the role of these enzymes and proteins were to aid DNA replication at specific sequences found on the chromosome, but the individual role of each enzyme and protein had not yet been established. There had been tests to figure this out in vitro, but not in vivo. Baker eventually helped discover the sequential steps that each enzyme and protein performed in order to start DNA replication in vivo. Baker performed this research during the time it took to get her master's and Ph.D.

== Career ==
For her postdoctoral research, she worked with Kiyoshi Mizuuchi at the National Institute of Health. This time her work was with DNA transposons. DNA transposons are also known as jumping genes because they move around the chromosome and can insert themselves into different DNA sequences. The ability of these genes to move around is extremely important in DNA's flexibility and ensuring that there are different combinations of DNA in genes. These transposons can also be the source of mutations. They can also help to increase the stability of certain DNA sequences. One aspect of some transposons that is important for research is that they can help bacteria exchange antibiotic resistance genes. Baker focused on one such transposon called the mu transposon found in E. coli.

Eventually, Baker left the National Institute of Health to work as an independent researcher at MIT. Here she discovered that mu transposons behave similarly to transposons and retrotransposons involved with bacterial resistance. Retrotransposons are transposons that first transcribe the moving gene sequence into RNA. This RNA then gets retro-transcribed back into DNA, and it is this DNA that ends up being reincorporated somewhere else in the chromosome. Through her work with these different transposons, Baker started to look at unfoldases, which are a type of protein chaperone. Unfoldases serve to unfold or degrade proteins found in cells. Unfoldases are related to transposons because some of them release proteins that aid in transposition. When the proteins are released, transposition of the DNA sequence is stopped, and Baker wanted to know what caused the proteins to release from DNA.

Currently, most of Baker's work focuses on these unfoldases. She works specifically with the AAA+ unfoldase family and has done a lot of research on the ClpX unfoldase. In addition to unfoldases, she looks at adaptors, which are proteins that aid the unfoldases. The AAA+ family of unfoldases is in all organisms and plays an important role in maintaining which proteins are active within a cell. Unfoldases help to destroy proteins that have become damaged or proteins that have built up too much. They are important in ensuring that proteins are properly recycled so that cells do not constantly need new amino acids. Baker wants to figure how unfoldases work and how they are controlled by cells.
