= Harvey Lodish =

American cell biologist, born 1941

Harvey F. Lodish
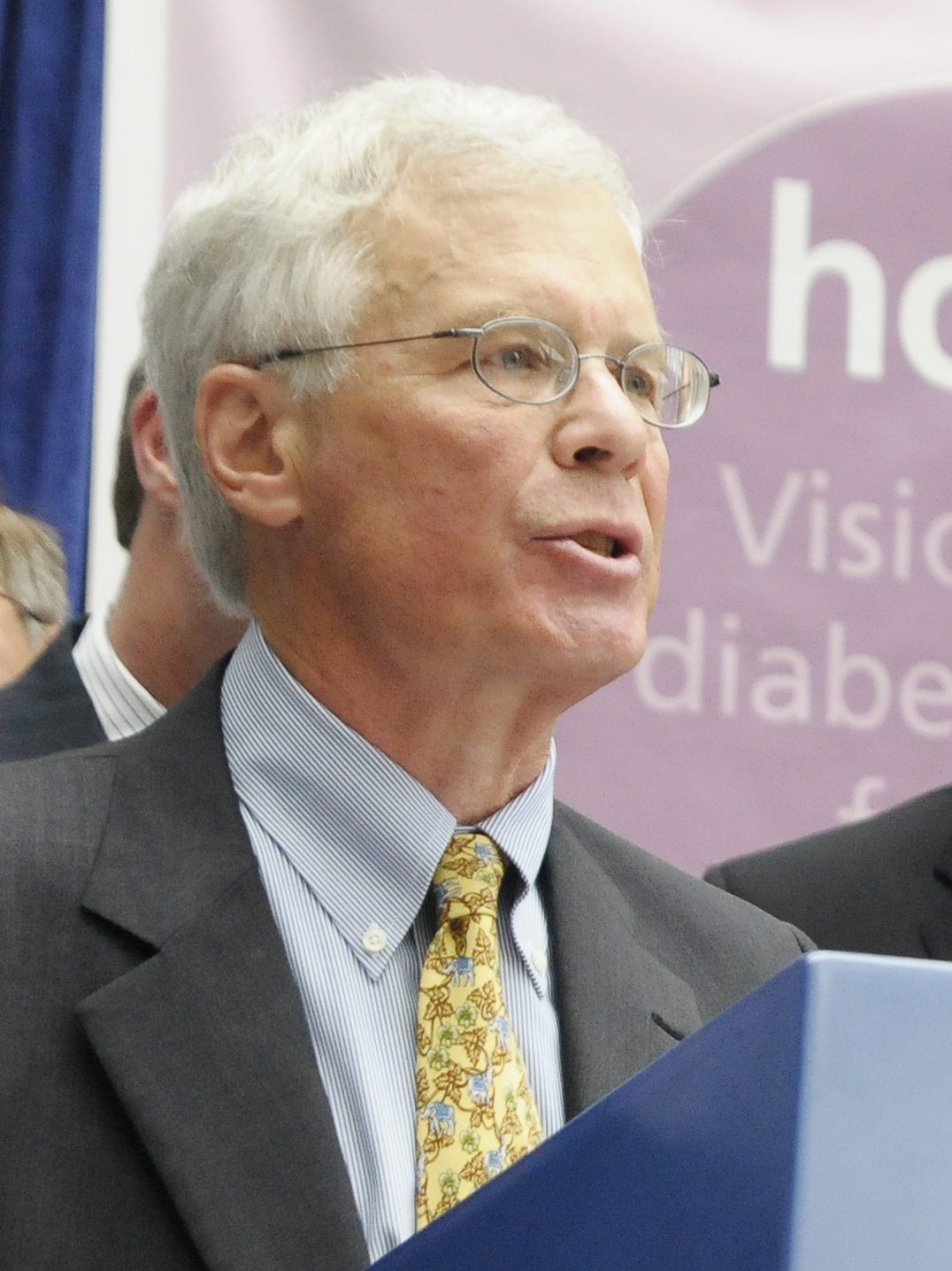
- Lodish in 2008
- Born: November 16, 1941 (age 84); Cleveland, Ohio
- Citizenship: United States
- Education: Rockefeller University; Kenyon College
- Scientific career
- Fields: Cell biology
- Workplaces: Whitehead Institute; MIT; MRC Laboratory of Molecular Biology
- Doctoral advisor: Norton Zinder
- Doctoral students: Charles Zuker; Lydia Villa-Komaroff

Harvey Franklin Lodish (born November 16, 1941) is a molecular and cell biologist, professor at the Massachusetts Institute of Technology (MIT), founding member of the Whitehead Institute for Biomedical Research, and lead author of the textbook Molecular Cell Biology. Lodish's research focused on cell surface proteins and other important areas at the interface between molecular cell biology and medicine.

== Biography ==
Lodish received his A.B. degree Summa Cum Laude and with Highest Honors in Chemistry and Mathematics, from Kenyon College in 1962, and his Ph.D. in genetics with Norton Zinder from the Rockefeller University in 1966. Following two years of postdoctoral research at the M.R.C. Laboratory of Molecular Biology with Sydney Brenner and Francis Crick (winners of the Nobel Prize in Physiology or Medicine, 2002 and 1962, respectively), he joined the faculty of the MIT Department of Biology. He was promoted to professor in 1976, and in 1983 was appointed founding member of the new Whitehead Institute for Biomedical Research by founding director David Baltimore (winner of the Nobel Prize in Physiology or Medicine, 1975). In 1999, Lodish also became professor of Biological Engineering in the new MIT Department of Biological Engineering.

Lodish has served on advisory panels for the U.S. National Institutes of Health and National Science Foundation and the American Cancer Society. He was chair of the advisory board of the Division of Basic Sciences of the Fred Hutchinson Cancer Center and of the Lerner Research Institute of the Cleveland Clinic. He has served on the advisory boards of several other institutions, including the Biozentrum of the University of Basel, the European Molecular Biology Laboratory in Heidelberg, the Center for Molecular Biology Heidelberg (ZMBH) in Germany, the Life Sciences Institute of the University of Michigan, and the PEW Scholars Program in Biomedical Sciences. He has served on the visiting ommittees of the California Institute of Technology Division of Biology and of the Engineering Division of the University of California Santa Barbara. He is currently on the advisory boards of the Chinese Organization for Rare Disorders and the Lausanne RE(ACT) Discovery Institute for rare diseases.

From 1989 through 2007 Lodish was a member of the board of trustees of Kenyon College, and currently is an emeritus trustee.

Lodish is a member of the board of trustees of Boston Children's Hospital, where he also was chair of the Research Committee of the board of trustees. From 2007 to 2014 he was chair of the Scientific Advisory Board of the Massachusetts Life Sciences Center, the group charged with oversight of the state's 10 year, $1 billion investment in the life sciences.

Lodish is the lead author of the textbook Molecular Cell Biology. The ninth edition was published in 2021 and the book has been translated into fourteen languages.

During the 2004 calendar year Lodish served as president of the American Society for Cell Biology.

Lodish was a founder and scientific advisory board member of Genzyme, Inc., Arris Pharmaceuticals, Inc., Millennium Pharmaceuticals, Inc, Allozyne, Inc., and Rubius Therapeutics. Together with two parents of children with Dravet Syndrome, he founded Tevard, a company developing novel gene therapy therapeutics for Dravet Syndrome and several other genetic brain disorders. And with two former students he founded Carmine, which develops red cell extracellular vesicles as gene delivery vehicles.

He has served on the Scientific Advisory Board for the Eisai Research Institute in Massachusetts and on the Scientific Advisory Board of Astra and then AstraZeneca Pharmaceuticals. He has testified as an expert witness in several high-profile biotechnology patent trials in federal court, notably Amgen vs. TKT Aventis in 2000, Amgen vs. Roche in 2009, and Biogen vs. Merck - Serono in 2018; he was on the winning side in all.

In 1963 he married Pamela Chentow. They have three married children and seven grandchildren.

== Research and teaching ==
Initially, Lodish's work focused on translational control of protein synthesis and on development of the cellular slime mold Dictyostelium discoideum. Beginning in 1973, his laboratory has concentrated on the biogenesis, structure, and function of several important secreted and plasma membrane glycoproteins. He defined the biosynthesis and maturation of the vesicular stomatitis virus and other plasma membrane glycoproteins, identified the intracellular organelles that mediate recycling of the asialoglycoprotein and transferrin receptors, and clarified the role of pH changes in delivery of iron to cells and recycling of the transferrin receptor. His group has elucidated steps in folding and oligomerization of several proteins within the endoplasmic reticulum, showed that exit of newly made proteins from this organelle requires that they be properly folded, and developed probes for measurement of the redox state within the endoplasmic reticulum.

His research group was the first to clone and sequence mRNAs encoding a mammalian glucose transport protein, GLUT1, and then GLUT2 and the insulin- responsive GLUT4, an anion exchange protein, a transporter for free fatty acids, the hepatic asialoglycoprotein receptors, intestinal sucrose-isomaltase, the erythropoietin receptor, two subunits of the TGFβ receptor, and several adipocyte-specific proteins including adiponectin (formerly Acrp30). These have been used to define the structure, biosynthesis, and cellular functions of these and related proteins and to identify and characterize related genes that encode proteins with important physiological functions.

He closed his laboratory in 2019; the most recent efforts of his group were focused on:

1. Erythropoiesis – activation of and signal transduction by the erythropoietin receptor in erythroid progenitor cells, and the regulation of transcription, apoptosis, cell division, and enucleation during erythropoiesis.
2. Hematopoietic stem cells – characterizing new marker cell surface proteins and new growth factors for their expansion in culture
3. The functions of adiponectin, an adipocyte-produced hormone that potently enhances glucose and fatty acid metabolism by muscle, and a family of adiponectin homologs.
4. Elucidating the roles of microRNAs and Long non-Coding RNAs in regulating hematopoiesis and fat and muscle cell development and metabolism

He has taught undergraduate courses at MIT in Molecular Biology, Cell Biology, and most recently Molecular Biotechnology. Together with Professor Andrew Lo of the MIT Sloan School of Management and several colleagues in the Biology and Biological Engineering Departments, he is currently teaching the course "Science and Business of Biotechnology" to over 80 MIT graduate students. The version he taught in 2019 is on line as an MIT EdX course and has enrolled over 28,000 students:

== Awards ==
Lodish is a member of the National Academy of Sciences, and served as chair of the National Academy Section on Cellular and Developmental Biology. He is also a fellow of the American Association for the Advancement of Science, a fellow of the American Academy of Arts and Sciences, a fellow of the American Academy of Microbiology, an associate (foreign) member of the European Molecular Biology Organization, and a foreign member of the Royal Academy of Medicine of Belgium. Lodish received a MERIT award from the National Institute of Diabetes and Digestive and Kidney Diseases. He is also a recipient of a Guggenheim Fellowship, the Stadie Award from the American Diabetes Association, and the 2010 Mentoring Award from the American Society of Hematology. In 2016 he received the American Society for Cell Biology Women In Cell Biology Sandra K. Masur Senior Leadership Award and was named a lifetime fellow by the Society. He received the 2016 Pioneer Award from the Diamond Blackfan Anemia Foundation, and the Metcalf Lifetime Achievement Award from the International Society for Experimental Hematology in 2020. In 2021 he received the Wallace H. Coulter Award for Lifetime Achievement in Hematology from the American Society of Hematology.

He is the recipient of honorary Doctorate of Science degrees from Kenyon College, the Chinese University of Hong Kong, and Case Western Reserve University.

Two former postdoctoral researchers in Lodish's laboratory have gone on to win Nobel Prizes: Aaron Ciechanover (Chemistry, 2004) and James Rothman (Physiology or Medicine, 2013). Eight of his students and fellows are elected members of the U.S. National Academies of Science or Medicine. In 1982 Lodish was elected to the Cleveland Heights High School (Cleveland Heights, Ohio) Alumni Hall of Fame, an honor he shares with his two younger brothers Leonard and Richard.

- Bard Lecture, Johns Hopkins University (2008)
