= Joseph Mougous =

American microbiologist

Joseph D. Mougous
- Born: 1976 (age 49–50)
- Education: Western Washington University (BS); University of California, Berkeley (PhD)
- Awards: Burroughs Wellcome Investigator in the Pathogenesis of Infectious Disease (2011) NAS Award in Molecular Biology (2021) Election to the National Academy of Sciences (2022)
- Scientific career
- Workplaces: University of Washington Yale University
- Website: https://mougouslab.org/

Joseph Mougous is an American microbiologist. He is the John F. Enders Professor of Microbial Pathogenesis and a Howard Hughes Medical Institute Investigator at Yale University. He previously served as a Professor of Microbiology, the Lynn M. and Michael D. Garvey Endowed Chair in Gastroenterology, the Director of the Microbial Interactions & Microbiome Center, and a Howard Hughes Medical Institute Investigator at the University of Washington. Mougous is best known for contributions to the field interbacterial antagonism, including discovering the antibacterial activity of the Type VI secretion system (T6SS).

== Education ==
Mougous graduated from Western Washington University with a BS in Chemistry in 1999. While there, he performed research in the laboratory of Professor David Patrick, using scanning tunnelling microscopy to study liquid crystals. Mougous was recognized as the Outstanding Chemistry Graduate at Western Washington University in 1999. He then pursued his Ph.D. at University of California-Berkeley under the mentorship of Carolyn Bertozzi, where he worked on the identification, characterization, and biosynthesis of sulfated metabolites in mycobacteria (including Mycobacterium tuberculosis).

After receiving his PhD in 2004, Mougous joined the laboratory of John Mekalanos at Harvard Medical School as a Damon Runyon Postdoctoral Fellow. There, he demonstrated that a previously uncharacterized gene cluster in Pseudomonas aeruginosa encodes a specialized protein secretion system (now referred to as a type VI secretion system, T6SS).

== Research and career ==
Mougous joined the faculty as an Assistant Professor in the Department of Microbiology at the University of Washington in 2008. He was the Lynn M. and Michael D. Garvey Endowed Chair in Gastroenterology and the Director of the Microbial Interactions & Microbiome Center at the University of Washington until 2025, when his laboratory relocated to Yale University.

In 2010, Mougous’ laboratory reported that the T6SS of P. aeruginosa targets toxins to other bacterial cells. Subsequently, Mougous and co-workers put forth the hypothesis that interbacterial antagonism is a general feature of the T6SS, and the Mougous lab was the first to demonstrate interspecies targeting by the T6SS. His group was also first to identify the molecular target of a T6SS antibacterial toxin, peptidoglycan, and they went on to identify numerous additional molecular targets of T6SS toxin superfamilies. The Mougous lab also contributed early findings supporting the concept that the T6SS helps shape the composition of human-associated microbial communities. In 2020, the Mougous group published a collaborative study with David R. Liu of Harvard University in which they repurposed a mutagenic antibacterial toxin from Burkholderia, DddA, into a genome editing tool designed for Mitochondrial DNA.

In addition to work on the T6SS, the Mougous lab demonstrated that the Esx pathway (also known as the Type VII secretion system) functions analogously to the T6SS in delivering toxins to competing bacterial cells. They described the genetic engineering of an epibiont from the Patescibacteria phylum (also known as the Candidate phyla radiation), and they discovered that Streptomyces and other Actinobacteria secrete large antibacterial particles named umbrella toxins.

== Honors and awards ==
- 1999 Outstanding Chemistry Graduate, Western Washington University, Bellingham, WA
- 2000 Ford Foundation Predoctoral Fellow, University of California, Berkeley, CA
- 2005 Damon Runyon Postdoctoral Fellow, Harvard Medical School, Boston, MA
- 2011 Burroughs Wellcome Investigator in the Pathogenesis of Infectious Disease, University of Washington, Seattle, WA
- 2011 Irving S. Sigal Memorial Award, American Society for Microbiology
- 2015 Investigator, Howard Hughes Medical Institute
- 2018 Finalist, Blavatnik Awards for Young Scientists
- 2019 Finalist, Blavatnik Awards for Young Scientists
- 2021 NAS Award in Molecular Biology
- 2022 Election to the National Academy of Sciences
