= Daniel E. Gottschling =

American molecular biologist

- Born: May 28, 1955 (age 71)
- Education: Augustana College (Illinois); University of Colorado Boulder
- Known for: Telomere position effect; telomerase RNA (TLC1); yeast aging
- Awards: NAS Award in Molecular Biology (1995)
- Scientific career
- Fields: Molecular biology, Genetics
- Workplaces: Fred Hutchinson Cancer Research Center; University of Chicago
- Doctoral advisor: Thomas Cech

Daniel Edward Gottschling (born May 28, 1955) is an American molecular biologist known for his research on telomeres, epigenetic gene silencing, and cellular aging in yeast. He helped establish the relationship between chromosome ends and reversible transcriptional repression, and later developed experimental systems to study replicative aging in eukaryotic cells.

He was elected to the National Academy of Sciences in 2011 and received the NAS Award in Molecular Biology in 1995 for his contributions to yeast genetics and chromosome biology. He was elected a Fellow of the American Academy of Arts and Sciences in 2010.

== Early life and education ==
Gottschling was born in Gary, Indiana, and grew up in the Midwest. He attended Augustana College, where he initially considered a career in medicine before turning to chemistry and ultimately research. He earned his PhD from the University of Colorado Boulder, where he worked with Thomas Cech and contributed to early studies on catalytic RNA.

== Career ==
After completing postdoctoral work at the Fred Hutchinson Cancer Research Center, Gottschling joined the faculty at the University of Chicago before returning to Fred Hutchinson, where he became a full member.

He was elected to the National Academy of Sciences in 2011.

== Research and contributions ==
Gottschling's early work examined the structure and function of chromosome ends (telomeres), identifying proteins that specifically recognize and protect these regions. He later demonstrated that genes located near telomeres in yeast can undergo reversible transcriptional repression, a phenomenon known as the telomere position effect, which provided a model for epigenetic regulation of gene expression. His laboratory identified key components of telomerase, including the RNA template required for chromosome end replication, helping to establish the molecular basis of telomere maintenance in eukaryotic cells.

In later work, Gottschling shifted focus to cellular aging, developing experimental systems to isolate and analyze aging yeast cells. These studies revealed molecular changes associated with replicative lifespan and genome instability, helping to link aging processes with broader questions in cell biology and disease.

== Honors and awards ==
Gottschling has received several honors for his contributions to molecular biology, including:

- National Academy of Sciences Award in Molecular Biology (1995)
- Pew Scholars Program in the Biomedical Sciences (1991–1995)
- Fletcher Scholar of the Cancer Research Foundation (1995–1997)
- Fellow of the American Academy of Arts and Sciences (2010)
