= Stephen P. Bell =

American biochemist

Stephen P. Bell is an American biochemist.

Bell earned a doctorate from the University of California, Berkeley, and teaches at the Massachusetts Institute of Technology, where he specializes in researching DNA replication and replisomes. He was named a Howard Hughes Medical Investigator in 2000. In 2009, Bell received the NAS Award in Molecular Biology and was named a member of the National Academy of Sciences itself in 2017. MIT appointed Bell the Uncas and Helen Whitaker Professor of Biology in 2018. He is a member of the Editorial Board for Genes & Development.
