= Iain Cheeseman =

- Citizenship: USA
- Education: Duke University
- Known for: Kinetochore research
- Awards: Harold W. Weintraub Graduate Student Award, Fred Hutchinson Cancer Research Center (2003); Fellow, Jane Coffin Childs Memorial Fund for Medical Research (2003); Kerr Award for Research Excellence, Ludwig Institute (2004); Smith Family New Investigator Award (2007)
- Scientific career
- Fields: Biochemistry
- Workplaces: Ludwig Institute for Cancer Research University of California, San Diego; Whitehead Institute for Biomedical Research (Cambridge, MA); Massachusetts Institute of Technology

Iain Cheeseman investigates the role of the kinetochore, a group of proteins required for cell division and chromosome segregation. This core network of proteins facilitates the attachment of chromosomes to microtubule polymers—the spindle structures that attach to the ends of cells, pulling and dividing them during cell division. The kinetochore is critical to ensuring duplication without loss or damage to the genetic material. Cheeseman is also investigating the activities of the individual molecular machines that make up this structure and how these proteins are controlled and regulated.

== Career ==
Cheeseman is noted for discovering multiple new kinetochore proteins within yeast, the Caenorhabditis elegans worm and human cells. He has focused particularly on the proteins that are required to generate connections with spindle microtubules. He recently demonstrated a critical and direct role for a protein complex called Ndc80 (coded for by the gene NDC80) in directly associating with microtubules.

Because many cancers may be driven by errors in chromosome segregation, it is hoped that Cheeseman's studies will provide payoffs in cancer research. Certain cancer drugs target the connection between chromosomes and spindle microtubules, and some of the major proteins in the kinetochore complex have been implicated in leukemia and other diseases.

Cheeseman is currently a junior Faculty Member at Whitehead Institute and a professor at MIT. He did his undergraduate training at Duke University, and his graduate work at the University of California, Berkeley, where he earned a doctorate in 2002. Cheeseman carried out his postdoctoral work in the lab of Arshad Desai at the Ludwig Institute for Cancer Research in San Diego and the University of California, San Diego.

He is a member of the editorial board for Current Biology.
