= Nanibaa' Garrison =

Navajo bioethicist, geneticist, and university professor

Náníbaaʼ Garrison
- Citizenship: Navajo
- Education: Stanford University (PhD)
- Known for: Bioethics of genetic testing in Indigenous communities
- Scientific career
- Fields: Genetics, bioethics
- Thesis: Genetic architecture of human pigmentation (2010)

Náníbaaʼ Garrison (Diné) is a bioethicist, geneticist, and professor in the Institute for Society and Genetics and Department of Internal Medicine at the University of California, Los Angeles. She is a member of the Navajo Nation, and her career has focused on studies of health conditions prevalent in, and attitudes toward genetics research among, the Navajo community.

== Education ==
Garrison earned her Ph.D. in the department of genetics at Stanford University, which was supported by a National Institutes of Health F31 fellowship. There, she studied the genetic architecture of human pigmentary variation, and afterward, she completed a postdoctoral fellowship at the university's biomedical ethics department. There, supported by her NIH F32 fellowship, she investigated the impact of the ASU Board of Regents v. Havasupai Tribe lawsuit on genetics research and Institutional Review Boards (IRBs). Notably, Garrison conducted interviews of IRB chairs and human genetics researchers with regard to the Havasupai lawsuit, and published recommendations for the structuring and regulation of future genetics research studies with Indigenous populations.

== Research and career ==
=== Research ===
She is a faculty member for the UCLA genetic counseling master's program, having formerly been an assistant professor at Vanderbilt University and the Seattle Children's Research Institute, affiliated with the University of Washington School of Medicine. Garrison joined the Division of Bioethics in the Department of Pediatrics at the University of Washington School of Medicine in 2015. The following year, she was awarded a 5-year National Institutes of Health K01 career development grant. Her project, 'Genomics and Native Communities: Perspectives, Ethics, and Engagement', aims to investigate the viewpoints of tribal leaders, physicians, scientists, and policymakers on genetic research involving Indigenous communities.

In 2019, Garrison received a grant to collaborate with pharmaceutics researcher Katrina Claw to conduct a survey of Navajo leaders, educators, and community members about their concerns regarding genetics research in tribal communities. She has also played a role in the negotiations between the Navajo Nation and the NIH that have resulted in a data-sharing agreement. This agreement will allow researchers to access health information of consenting Navajo participants; however, this does not permit access to genetic data or biological samples, which has been banned since 2002.

=== Public engagement and outreach ===
Garrison co-facilitates the Summer Internship for Indigenous Peoples (SING), which consists of an international set of workshops that focus on facilitating discussions on Indigenous people's cultural values and building capacity to increase the number of Indigenous peoples in science research, leadership and teaching careers. Garrison has served as a Member on the Advisory Council of the United States Indigenous Data Sovereignty Network.

=== Awards and honors ===
In 2009, Garrison received the 12th Annual Anne Ninham Medicine Mentorship Award from the American Indian Staff Forum at Stanford University. In 2012, she attended the Society for the Advancement of Chicanos and Native Americans in Science (SACNAS) Leadership Institute, sponsored by SACNAS and the American Association for the Advancement of Science.
