= Robert T. Sauer =

American biochemist (born 1948)

- Born: July 13, 1948 (age 78); Cornwall, New York
- Education: Amherst College (B.A.), Harvard University (Ph.D.)
- Scientific career
- Fields: Biochemistry, biophysics
- Workplaces: Massachusetts Institute of Technology

Robert Thomas Sauer (born 13 July 1948) is an American biochemist who is the Salvador E. Luria Professor of Biology at the Massachusetts Institute of Technology.

== Early life and education ==
Bob Sauer was born in Cornwall, New York, in the Hudson Valley area of New York. He attended Amherst College in Massachusetts as an undergraduate and earned his bachelor's degree in biophysics in 1972. He received his PhD in Biochemistry and Molecular Biology from Harvard University in 1979.

== Academic career ==
Sauer joined the faculty at the Massachusetts Institute of Technology in 1978, a year before he completed his PhD. He has remained at MIT for his entire academic career, becoming a full professor in 1987 and the Edwin C. Whitehead Professor in 1991. Sauer assumed his current appointment as the Salvador E. Luria Professor of Biology in 1999. He has held a number of service roles at MIT and spent five years, from 1999 to 2004, as the head of the biology department. He was the president of the Protein Society from 1997 to 1999.

Sauer was elected to the American Academy of Arts and Sciences in 1996 and to both the American Academy of Microbiology and the United States National Academy of Sciences in 1996. He has received both the Hans Neurath Award and the Stein and Moore Award from the Protein Society.

== Research ==
Sauer's research group has focused on protein structure and folding, and the relationship of structure to the molecular mechanisms of intermolecular interactions such as DNA binding. His group has made significant contributions to the study of protein degradation and its regulation in living cells.
