= Michael P. Snyder =

American genetics researcher

Michael Paul Snyder
- Born: 1955 (age 70–71); Pottstown, Pennsylvania
- Education: University of Rochester, California Institute of Technology
- Occupations: Geneticist, Stanford W. Ascherman Professor of Genetics, Former chair of the genetics department, Stanford University, Director of the Stanford Center for Genomics and Personalized Medicine
- Known for: RNA sequencing, ChIP-chip and CHIP-seq(11), genomics, pioneering multi-omic longitudinal health tracking, wearable technology, systems biology, systems medicine
- Scientific career
- Fields: Genetics, genomics, personalized medicine
- Workplaces: Yale University; Stanford University
- Doctoral advisor: Dr. Norman Davidson
- Other academic advisors: Dr. Ronald Davis

Michael Paul Snyder is an American genomicist, professor, and former chair of genetics at Stanford University School of Medicine. He also serves as the director of the Stanford Center for Genomics and Personalized Medicine.

Snyder's research focuses on "omics", the study of genomes, transcriptomes, proteomes, and other high-throughput omics datasets. His lab has contributed to understanding the genomes and transcriptomes of yeast and humans. The lab also pioneered the use of multi-omic longitudinal profiling to monitor health.

== Early life and education ==
Snyder was born in 1955 and grew up outside of Pottstown, Pennsylvania. His father, Kermit Snyder, was an accountant and his mother, Phyllis Snyder, was an elementary school teacher. He attended Owen J. Roberts High School and later earned a BA in chemistry and biology from the University of Rochester. Snyder completed a PhD in biology from the California Institute of Technology, where he trained in the laboratory of Norman Davidson. He pursued postdoctoral training at Stanford under Ronald W. Davis.

== Career and appointments ==
Snyder began his academic career at Yale University in 1986 as an assistant professor in the department of biology. He was granted tenure at Yale in 1994 and became chair of the new molecular, cellular, and developmental biology (MCDB) department from 1998 to 2004. During his tenure at Yale, he also directed the Center for Genomics and Proteomics. His research at Yale included work on chromosome segregation and cell polarity, leading to the identification of a number of related genes.

In 2009, Snyder joined Stanford University, where he chaired the genetics department until 2024 and directs the Stanford Center for Genomics and Personalized Medicine. He has also served as principal investigator of the Center of Excellence in the Genome Sciences (CEGS) from 2001 to 2011 and was co-director of the CIRM Center for Stem Cell Genomics, as well as director for the Center for Genome of Gene Regulation.

Snyder was president of the US Human Proteome Organization from 2006 to 2008, elected to the American Academy of Arts and Sciences in 2015, and president of the international Human Proteome Organization from 2017 to 2018. He led the National Institutes of Health's Encyclopedia of DNA Elements (ENCODE)'s production center for mapping regulatory regions of the human genome.

Snyder has co-founded biotechnology companies, including Personalis, SensOmics, Qbio, January AI, Filtricine, Mirvie, Protos, Protometrix (now part of Thermo Fisher Scientific), Affomix (now part of Illumina), and Iollo.

== Research ==
Snyder has made contributions to medicine, genomics, and biotechnology. Snyder's laboratory has invented a number of novel systems-wide and genomics technologies, including RNA-Seq for mapping transcriptomes, NextGen Paired end sequencing for mapping genomes, protein microarrays, and ChIP-Chip (later ChIP-Seq) for globally mapping transcription factor binding sites. Snyder's laboratory initially focused on studying the genome of the yeast Saccharomyces cerevisiae, a eukaryote model organism commonly used in genetics and molecular biology, where he launched the large scale analysis of genes and proteins. Later, the lab began to use the same techniques to look at the human genome. His laboratory performed the first multi omics analysis of a human and pioneered the field of precision health.

In 2003, the Encyclopedia of DNA Elements (ENCODE) project was launched by the US National Human Genome Research Institute (NHGRI), with the goal of identifying all functional elements in the human genome. He has been a principal investigator in the ENCODE project since its inception in 2003 and the Snyder lab has contributed a large number of data sets.

== Awards ==
In recognition for "developing and disseminating widely-used technology for the simultaneous analysis of thousands of genes, RNA molecules, and proteins" Snyder received the 2019 Genetics Society of America (GSA) George W. Beadle Award. In 2025, Snyder was awarded the Precision Medicine World Conference Pioneer Award for his contributions to Precision Medicine.
