= Therese Ann Markow =

American physical anthropologist and ecologist

- Education: Arizona State University
- Known for: Genetics; Ecology
- Awards: Presidential Award for Excellence in Science, Mathematics, and Engineering Mentoring; Genetics Society of America George Beadle Award
- Scientific career
- Workplaces: Arizona State University; University of Arizona; University of California, San Diego; National Laboratory for the Genomics of Biodiversity, Guanajuato, Mexico; Monterrey Institute of Technology and Higher Education (Fulbright Scholar)

Therese Ann Markow is the Amylin Chair in Life Sciences Emeritus at the University of California, San Diego. Her research involves the use of genetics and ecology to study the insects of the Sonoran Desert. She was awarded the Presidential Award for Excellence in Science, Mathematics, and Engineering Mentoring in 2001 and the Genetics Society of America George Beadle Award in 2012. Her continued use, without explicit informed consent, of DNA samples collected from her genetic studies of diabetes in the Havasupai tribe, highlighted the importance of obtaining a subject's consent to use DNA for broad research purposes.

== Early life and education ==
Markow studied physical anthropology at Arizona State University (ASU). She was a member of the honorary Phi Kappa Phi. She remained there for her doctoral studies, focussing on Drosophila genetics with Charles Woolf. She completed her doctorate in 1974, and spent time as a postdoctoral researcher at Indiana University in the laboratory of Anthony Mahowald. Upon returning to Arizona, she held research professor positions before being appointed an assistant professor at ASU.

== Research and career ==
Markow was appointed a professor of zoology at ASU in 1990. In 1993 she initiated the Minority Access to Research Careers program, supported by NIH, to support students from underrepresented groups pursue careers in biosciences. She served as Director of the National Science Foundation Program in Population Biology. In 1995 she was awarded a Fulbright Program fellowship, which allowed her to pass a semester at the Monterrey Institute of Technology, Campus Guaymas, in Sonora, where she conducted long-term studies on natural populations of cactophilic Drosophila. At Arizona State University she became Regents Professor, the highest honour bestowed upon a faculty member. During her last three years at Arizona State University, she served as editor-in-chief of the journal Evolution.

In 1999, Markow moved to the University of Arizona in Tucson as Regents’ Professor of Ecology and Evolutionary Biology and Director of the Center for Insect Science. Upon moving to the University of Arizona, she moved the National Drosophila Species Stock Center to Tucson, establishing annual workshops, with Patrick O’Grady of Cornell University, on the use of species other than D. melanogaster for research. Markow founded the Drosophila Species Genome Consortium, the genomes of 12 Drosophila species were sequenced, assembled, annotated, which expanded the genetic resources available to the research community.

Markow joined University of California, San Diego in 2008, where she was appointed Amylin Chair in Life Sciences and continued as Director of the Drosophila Species Stock Center which moved with her to UCSD. In 2012 she joined the National Laboratory for the Genomics of Biodiversity in Mexico, which allowed her research alongside participating in the training of Mexican graduate students. Since 2013 she has served as one of Mexico's Sistema Nacional de Investigadores (SNI III). Her research recently has focussed upon use of ecological diverse Drosophila species as a models to understand public health problems such as diabetes and obesity. In addition to her studies of ecological and evolutionary genomics of Drosophila, she undertook, with funding from the World Wildlife Fund, studies of the genetics and genomics of monarch butterflies in Mexico.

Markow also worked at the National Laboratory for the Genomics of Biodiversity, Guanajuato, Mexico, where her work included research into Drosophila reproduction.

As of 2025, Markow is the Amylin Chair in Life Sciences Emeritus at the University of California, San Diego.

=== Havasupai DNA study ===
In the early 1990s, after high rates of diabetes significantly affected the population of the Grand Canyon-based Havasupai Indian tribe, Markow and ASU colleague social anthropologist John Martin embarked on a study to look for genetic causes of the disease. Over 200 volunteers from the tribe signed a broad consent form stating that they were donating blood samples to “study the causes of behavioral/medical disorders”. Hand and fingerprints were also taken for the study. Based on Martin's additional observations that the tribe may be exhibiting symptoms of schizophrenia, Markow and Martin obtained funding to study diabetes, schizophrenia and depression in the tribe, research that was approved in 1992 by ASU's human subjects committee. The study was funded by university funds and a grant from the National Alliance for Research on Schizophrenia and Depression in New York. Later funding came from small grants from the National Science Foundation and the National Institutes of Health.

The schizophrenia research was abandoned after a psychiatrist could find no evidence of the condition in the tribe. Markow was also unable to identify a link to diabetes similar to that found in the nearby Pima tribe with a particular variant of a protein coding gene involved in immune recognition, called HLA-A2. The samples were also damaged in 1994 by a freezer failure, and in 1999, Markow had left ASU to join the University of Arizona.

In 2002, ASU graduate student Daniel Garrigan was able to salvage genetic material from the damaged cells. By analyzing DNA microsatellites, he was able to study the tribe's genetic variability. By early 2003, he had found sufficient genetic variability that would permit reassessment of genetic underpinnings to diabetes. Garrigan had a paper reporting the variability accepted by the journal Genetics. In March 2003, when he went to the podium at ASU to defend his thesis as part of his doctoral examination, Havasupai tribe member Carletta Tilousi publicly challenged his ownership of the research data. The paper was withdrawn, and the data was removed from Garrigan's thesis. Martin then complained to ASU's human subjects committee that the research had strayed beyond the original goal of diabetes research. The committee investigated and found no problems with the study.

Despite the committee's findings, the tribe filed a lawsuit claiming it had been misled about the research and its goals. Havasupai Tribe v. the Arizona Board of Regents was filed against the Arizona Board of Regents and Markow, alleging that additional research had been performed on the samples without the tribe's permission. The tribe also issued a banishment order forbidding any researchers from ASU from entering the reservation. Markow defended her research methods and attributed the tribe's concerns to a misunderstanding of how genetic research works, as well as a possible language barrier in granting broad permission to use the DNA. The tribe requested $70 million in damages, and in April 2010, the Arizona Board of Regents settled the case for $700,000, and agreed to return the blood samples.

=== Awards and honours ===
- Her awards and honours include:
- 2001 Presidential Award for Excellence in Science, Mathematics, and Engineering Mentoring
- 2005 YWCA USA Women on the Move Honoree
- 2006 Elected President of the Society for the Study of Evolution
- 2007 Arizona State University Women's Plaza of Honour
- 2008 Elected Fellow of the American Association for the Advancement of Science
- 2012 Genetics Society of America George Beadle Award

=== Selected publications ===
Her publications include:

- Markow, Therese Ann (1995). "Evolutionary Ecology and Developmental Instability". Annual Review of Entomology. 40: 105–120. doi:10.1146/annurev.en.40.010195.000541.
- Markow, Therese Ann (2005). Drosophila: A Guide to Species Identification and Use. Elsevier. ISBN 9780080454092.
- Markow, Therese Ann (2007). "Evolution of genes and genomes on the Drosophila phylogeny". Nature. 450 (7167): 203–218. Bibcode:2007Natur.450..203C. doi:10.1038/nature06341. PMID 17994087.
- Markow, Therese Ann (2008). "Biological stoichiometry from genes to ecosystems". Ecology Letters. 3 (6): 540–550. doi:10.1111/j.1461-0248.2000.00185.x.
