= Susan Celniker =

American biologist

Susan E. Celniker
- Education: Pitzer College; University of North Carolina, Chapel Hill
- Known for: Drosophila genome
- Scientific career
- Workplaces: Berkeley Lab; Caltech

Susan E. Celniker is an American biologist, a staff scientist at Lawrence Berkeley National Laboratory and an adjunct professor Comparative Biochemistry department at University of California, Berkeley. She is the co-director of the Berkeley Drosophila Genome Project.

She has pioneered Drosophila functional genomics, the use of the fruit fly as a genetic model organism for human and environmental health, and launched studies of the transcriptome for NHGRI's modENCODE (which serves as an encyclopedia of DNA Elements) project. Her work was pivotal in making the Drosophila genome one of the best curated animal genomes, and a widely used model for genomic research.

== Education ==
Celniker graduated from Pitzer College with a BA in Biology and Anthropology and her PhD in biochemistry from the University of North Carolina, Chapel Hill.

== Career ==
After completing her PhD, she started research as a postdoctoral fellow at Caltech under NIH Postdoctoral Service Award from 1983 to 1986 where she worked with Edward B. Lewis (who later became Nobel Laureate in 1995) where she explored the structure and the function of Abdominal B (Abd-B), the most distal gene in the Drosophila bithorax complex. In 1995, she was hired as a staff scientist at Lawrence Berkeley National Laboratory.

== Women in Science ==
Celniker is an advocate of Women in STEM, and she is the founder of the "Leo Celniker Fund for Women in Science," named after her father Leo Celniker, who was a physicist and a member of National Organization of Women (NOW) for 20 years.

== Awards and honors ==
- 2019 Berkeley Lab Lifetime Achievement Award
- 2016 George Beadle Award from the Genetics Society of America.
- 2001 AAAS Newcomb Cleveland Prize for "The Genome Sequence of Drosophila melanogaster.”
