= Philip Hieter =

American scientist

Philip Hieter (born in 1952) is an American scientist specializing in yeast genetics. He is currently a professor of medical genetics at the Michael Smith Laboratories at the University of British Columbia. He is a member of the National Academy of Sciences.
