= Allan C. Spradling =

American geneticist

- Born: 1949 (age 76–77)
- Education: University of Chicago, Massachusetts Institute of Technology
- Awards: Newcomb Cleveland Prize (1983); Genetics Society of America Medal (1989); Edwin Grant Conklin Medal (2003); George W. Beadle Award (2003); Gruber Prize in Genetics (2008); March of Dimes Prize in Developmental Biology (2018); Wiley Prize (2024)
- Scientific career
- Fields: Genetics
- Workplaces: Carnegie Institution for Science, Howard Hughes Medical Institute

Allan Charles Spradling is an American scientist and principal investigator at the Carnegie Institution for Science and the Howard Hughes Medical Institute who studies egg development in the model organism, Drosophila melanogaster, a fruit fly. He is considered a leading researcher in the developmental genetics of the fruit fly egg and has developed a number of techniques in his career that have led to greater understanding of fruit fly genetics including contributions to sequencing its genome. He is also an adjunct professor at Johns Hopkins University and at the Johns Hopkins University School of Medicine.

== Education ==
Spradling obtained an A.B. in physics from the University of Chicago. He earned his Ph.D. in cell biology from the Massachusetts Institute of Technology in 1975 and completed a postdoctoral fellowship at Indiana University. He joined Carnegie Institution for Science in 1980 and served as the director of the organization's former Department of Embryology between 1994 and 2016.

== Career ==
Spradling and fellow American geneticist Gerald M. Rubin are considered pioneers in the field of genetics for their work in the early 1980s with their idea to "attach" a gene to a Drosophila transposon, P elements, known to insert itself into fruit fly's chromosomes. From this research came work from other scientists on transposons as a tool for genetic alterations in organisms.

Spradling was elected to the National Academy of Sciences in 1989. In 2003 Spradling was awarded both the Beadle Medal and the Edwin G. Conklin Medal from the Society for Developmental Biology. In 2008 Spradling was awarded the Gruber Prize in Genetics for his work on the Drosophila genome and continues his work in investigating novel technological approaches to genetics, egg development and stem cells. He was elected to the American Philosophical Society in 2016. In 2024 he received the Wiley Prize.
