= Gerald Fink =

American biologist

- Born: July 1, 1940 (age 86); Brooklyn, New York, U.S.
- Education: Amherst College; Yale University (Ph.D.)
- Known for: Discovering a method to transform yeast cells
- Awards: NAS Award in Molecular Biology (1981); Genetics Society of America Medal (1982); Emil Christian Hansen Foundation Award for Microbiology, Denmark (1986); George W. Beadle Award (2001); Gruber Prize in Genetics (2010); MIT Killian Faculty Achievement Award (2019)
- Scientific career
- Fields: Biochemistry, Genetics
- Institutions: Cornell University, Yale University, Whitehead Institute, and Massachusetts Institute of Technology

Gerald Ralph Fink (born July 1, 1940) is an American biologist, who was Director of the Whitehead Institute at MIT from 1990 to 2001. He graduated from Amherst College in 1962 and received a Ph.D. from Yale University in 1965, having elucidated the histidine pathway in budding yeast, Saccharomyces cerevisiae. After postdoctoral study at the National Institutes of Health with Bruce Ames on the regulation of the histidine operon of Salmonella, in 1967 he joined Cornell University where he became a Professor of Genetics and pursued the study of the HIS4 region of yeast. In 1982 he became a founding member of the Whitehead Institute and Professor of Genetics at MIT. Dr. Fink was elected to the United States National Academy of Sciences in 1981, to the Institute of Medicine in 1996, and to the American Philosophical Society in 2003.

Fink taught a course in the Molecular Biology of Yeast at Cold Spring Harbor Laboratory for 16 years. Many of these students as well as his university students went on to have successful careers in molecular biology.

In 1977, Fink and his students Albert Hinnen and Jim Hicks, discovered a method to transform yeast cells, a procedure that allows scientists to introduce genetic material (DNA) from another organism into living yeast cells so that the expression and hereditability of the introduced DNA can be studied. This transformation procedure is not only essential for basic research, but is used to produce vaccines and other medically important products in yeast.

In 1992 Fink and his students discovered that bakers’ yeast could switch from a cellular form to a filamentous form. This switch is important for many disease-causing fungi of both plants and animals.

In 2003 Fink chaired a National Research Council Committee that resulted in a highly influential report, Biotechnology Research in an Age of Terrorism: Confronting the Dual Use Dilemma (http://download.nap.edu/cart/deliver.cgi?record_id=10827). This report recommended practices that could improve the capacity to prevent the destructive application of biotechnology research while still enabling legitimate research to be conducted.

Fink has won the National Academy of Sciences Award in Molecular Biology (1981), the Genetics Society of America Medal, (1982), the Emil Christian Hansen Award for Microbiology (1986), the George W. Beadle Award (2001), and the Gruber Prize in Genetics (2010). In 2020 he was awarded the Thomas Hunt Morgan Medal by the Genetics Society of America.

Fink is the husband of Rosalie Fink, an educator and author of books on learning disabilities. They have two daughters.
