= List of members of the National Academy of Sciences (genetics) =

This list is a subsection of the List of members of the National Academy of Sciences, which includes more than 7,000 members and international members of the United States National Academy of Sciences, both living and deceased, each affiliated with one of 31 disciplinary sections. Members are listed under their primary section, and each person's name, primary institution, and election year are given. For deceased members, the year of death is noted.

Name	Institution	Date
Victor Ambros	University of Massachusetts Medical School	2007
Angelika Amon (died 2020)	MIT	2010
Kathryn Anderson (died 2020)	Memorial Sloan-Kettering Cancer Center	2002
Thomas F. Anderson (died 1991)	University of Pennsylvania	1964
Brenda Andrews	University of Toronto	2020
Werner Arber	University of Basel	1984
Ernest B. Babcock (died 1954)	University of California, Berkeley	1946
Bruce Baker (died 2018)	Stanford University	1993
Utpal Banerjee	University of California, Los Angeles	2018
Rodolphe Barrangou	North Carolina State University	2018
Bonnie Bartel	Rice University	2016
George Beadle (died 1989)	Stanford University	1944
Hugo J. Bellen	Baylor College of Medicine	2020
Seymour Benzer (died 2007)	California Institute of Technology	1961
Sue Biggins	Fred Hutchinson Cancer Research Center	2015
Kerry Bloom	University of North Carolina at Chapel Hill	2021
Jef D. Boeke	New York University	2013
Nancy Bonini	University of Pennsylvania	2012
Charles Boone	University of Toronto	2024
David Botstein (died 2026)	Princeton University	1981
Sydney Brenner (died 2019)	Salk Institute for Biological Studies	1977
Royal Alexander Brink (died 1984)	University of Wisconsin–Madison	1947
R. Daniel Camerini-Otero	NIH	2025
Allan Campbell (died 2018)	Stanford University	1971
John Carlson	Yale University	2012
Marian Carlson	Columbia University	2009
David Catcheside (died 1994)	Australian National University	1974
L. L. Cavalli-Sforza (died 2018)	Stanford University	1978
Martin Chalfie	Columbia University	2004
Louise Chow	University of Alabama at Birmingham	2012
Thomas W. Cline	University of California, Berkeley	1996
Stanley N. Cohen	Stanford University	1979
Victor Corces	Emory University School of Medicine	2020
Elizabeth A. Craig	University of Wisconsin–Madison	1998
James F. Crow (died 2012)	University of Wisconsin–Madison	1961
Ronald W. Davis	Stanford University	1983
Joseph DeRisi	UC San Francisco	2016
August H. Doermann (died 1991)	University of Washington	1975
William Dove	University of Wisconsin–Madison	1998
Monica A. Driscoll	Rutgers University	2023
Jay Dunlap	Dartmouth College	2009
Susan K. Dutcher	Washington University in St. Louis	2025
Harrison Echols (died 1993)	University of California, Berkeley	1991
Robert Stuart Edgar (died 2016)	University of California, Santa Cruz	2007
Evan E. Eichler	University of Washington	2013
Sarah Elgin	Washington University in St. Louis	2018
Scott Emmons	Albert Einstein College of Medicine	2024
Ellis Englesberg	University of California, Santa Barbara	1986
Stanley Fields	University of Washington	2000
Gerald Fink	Massachusetts Institute of Technology	1981
Andrew Fire	Stanford University	2004
Maurice Fox (died 2020)	Massachusetts Institute of Technology	1988
Antonio García-Bellido (died 2025)	Autonomous University of Madrid	1987
Barry Ganetzky	UW Madison	2006
Alan Garen (died 2022)	Yale University	1971
Martin Gellert	National Institutes of Health	1986
Michel A. J. Georges	University of Liège	2013
Norman Giles (died 2006)	University of Georgia	1966
N. Louise Glass	University of California, Berkeley	2021
Michael M. Gottesman	National Institutes of Health	2018
Susan Gottesman	National Institutes of Health	1998
Daniel E. Gottschling	Fred Hutchinson Cancer Research Center	2011
Melvin M. Green (died 2017)	University of California, Davis	1980
Iva S. Greenwald	Columbia University	2005
Shiv Grewal	NIH	2014
Carol Gross	University of California, San Francisco	1992
Alan D. Grossman	MIT	2014
Christine Guthrie (died 2022)	University of California, San Francisco	1993
James E. Haber	Brandeis University	2010
Benjamin D. Hall (died 2019)	University of Washington	2014
Jeffrey Hall	Brandeis University	2003
Philip Hanawalt	Stanford University	1989
Caryl Parker Haskins (died 2001)	Carnegie Institution of Washington	1956
R. Scott Hawley (died 2025)	Stowers Institute for Medical Research	2011
Ulrike Heberlein	HHMI	2010
Donald Helinski	University of California, San Diego	1980
Steven Henikoff	Fred Hutchinson Cancer Research Center	2005
Tina Henkin	Ohio State University	2012
Alfred Hershey (died 1997)	Carnegie Institution of Washington	1958
Leonard Herzenberg (died 2013)	Stanford University	1982
Philip Hieter	University of British Columbia	2016
Alan Hinnebusch	NIH	2015
Ann Hochschild	Harvard Medical School	2024
Mark Hochstrasser	Yale University	2025
Alexander Hollaender (died 1986)	Associated Universities, Inc.	1957
Nancy Hopkins	Massachusetts Institute of Technology	2004
Anita Hopper	Ohio State University	2021
Norman Horowitz (geneticist) (died 2005)	California Institute of Technology	1969
H. Robert Horvitz	Massachusetts Institute of Technology	1991
David Housman	Massachusetts Institute of Technology	1994
Malcolm Robert Irwin (died 1987)	University of Wisconsin-Madison	1950
Harvey Itano (died 2010)	University of California, San Diego	1979
Francois Jacob (died 2013)	Institut Pasteur	1969
Patricia Jacobs	University of Southampton	2009
Maria Jasin	Memorial Sloan Kettering Cancer Center	2015
Nancy Jenkins	Houston Methodist Research Institute	2008
Sue Jinks-Robertson	Duke University School of Medicine	2019
Alexander D. Johnson	UC San Francisco	2011
Mark Johnston	University of Colorado School of Medicine	2022
A. Dale Kaiser (died 2010)	Stanford University	1970
Berwind P. Kaufmann (died 1975)	Cold Spring Harbor Laboratory	1952
Scott N. Keeney	Memorial Sloan Kettering Cancer Center	2020
Cynthia Kenyon	University of California, San Francisco	2003
Mary-Claire King	University of Washington	2005
Hitoshi Kihara (died 1986)	Kihara Institute for Biological Research	1958
Nancy Kleckner	Harvard University	1993
Douglas Koshland	UC Berkeley	2010
Mark Krasnow	Stanford University School of Medicine	2019
Leonid Kruglyak	University of California, Los Angeles	2023
Mitzi Kuroda	Harvard University	2013
Sydney Kustu (died 2014)	University of California, Berkeley	1993
Joshua Lederberg (died 2008)	Rockefeller University	1957
Pedro León Azofefa	Academia Nacional de Ciencias (Costa Rica)	2005
Leonard Lerman (died 2012)	Massachusetts Institute of Technology	1986
Cyrus Levinthal (died 1990)	Columbia University	1970
Edward B. Lewis (died 2004)	California Institute of Technology	1968
Michael Lichten	National Institutes of Health	2022
Susan Lindquist (died 2016)	Massachusetts Institute of Technology	1997
Dan Lindsley (died 2018)	University of California, San Diego	1974
David Lipman	National Institutes of Health	2003
John T. Lis	Cornell University	2015
Susan Lovett	Brandeis University	2021
Victoria Lundblad	Salk Institute for Biological Studies	2015
Salvador Luria (died 1991)	Massachusetts Institute of Technology	1960
Mary F. Lyon (died 2014)	Medical Research Council	1979
Boris Magasanik (died 2013)	Massachusetts Institute of Technology	1969
Harmit Malik	Fred Hutchinson Cancer Center	2019
Barbara McClintock (died 1992)	Carnegie Institution of Washington	1944
Craig Mello	University of Massachusetts Medical School	2005
M. S. Meselson	Harvard University	1968
Charles W. Metz (died 1975)	University of Pennsylvania	1948
Robert Metzenberg (died 2007)	University of California, Los Angeles	1997
Barbara Meyer	University of California, Berkeley	2000
Lois K. Miller (died 1999)	University of Georgia	1997
Beatrice Mintz (died 2022)	Fox Chase Cancer Center	1973
Danesh Moazed	Harvard Medical School	2023
Hermann Joseph Muller (died 1967)	University of Texas at Austin	1931
Andrew W. Murray	Harvard University	2014
Terry Orr-Weaver	MIT	2006
Howard Nash (died 2011)	National Institutes of Health	1990
James V. Neel (died 2000)	University of Michigan Medicine	1963
Elaine Ostrander	National Human Genome Research Institute	2019
Ray David Owen (died 2014)	California Institute of Technology	1966
David C. Page	MIT	2005
Rafael Palacios	Universidad Nacional Autonoma de Mexico	2006
Mary-Lou Pardue (died 2024)	Massachusetts Institute of Technology	1983
David Perkins (died 2007)	Stanford University	1981
Thomas Petes	Duke University	1999
Guido Pontecorvo (died 1999)	Imperial Cancer Research Fund	1983
John Preer Jr. (died 2016)	Indiana University	1976
James Priess	Fred Hutchinson Cancer Center	2017
John R. Pringle	Stanford University School of Medicine	2017
Mark Ptashne	Memorial Sloan-Kettering Cancer Center	1979
Theodore Puck (died 2005)	University of Colorado Boulder	1960
Miroslav Radman	Necker–Enfants Malades Hospital	2018
Marcus Morton Rhoades (died 1991)	Indiana University	1946
Jasper Rine	UC Berkeley	2008
Jeffrey Roberts	Cornell University	1999
Shirleen Roeder	Yale University	2009
Herschel L. Roman (died 1989)	University of Washington	1970
John Roth	University of California, Davis	1988
Lucia B. Rothman-Denes	University of Chicago	2014
Rodney Rothstein	Columbia University	2015
Gerald Rubin	Howard Hughes Medical Institute	1987
Elizabeth S. Russell (died 2001)	Jackson Laboratory	1972
Liane Russell (died 2019)	Oak Ridge National Laboratory	1986
William L. Russell (died 2003)	Oak Ridge National Laboratory	1973
Gary Ruvkun	Harvard University	2008
Ruth Sager (died 1997)	Dana–Farber Cancer Institute	1977
Margarita Salas (died 2019)	Consejo Superior de Investigaciones Cientificas (CSIC)	2007
Matthew Scott	Stanford University	1999
Julie Segre	National Human Genome Research Institute	2022
Eric Selker	University of Oregon	2012
Richard Setlow (died 2015)	Brookhaven National Laboratory	1973
Geraldine Seydoux	Johns Hopkins University	2016
Jay Shendure	University of Washington	2022
Fred Sherman (died 2013)	University of Rochester	1985
Obaid Siddiqi	Tata Institute of Fundamental Research	2003
Melvin Simon	California Institute of Technology	1985
Oliver Smithies (died 2017)	University of North Carolina at Chapel Hill	1971
Franklin Stahl (died 2025)	University of Oregon	1976
Peter Starlinger	University of Cologne	1987
Kári Stefánsson	University of Iceland	2019
George Streisinger (died 1984)	University of Oregon	1975
Gisela Storz	NIH	2012
F. William Studier	Brookhaven National Laboratory	1992
Alfred Sturtevant (died 1970)	California Institute of Technology	1930
Lorraine S. Symington	Columbia University Irving Medical Center	2020
Jiazhen Tan (died 2008)	Fudan University	1985
J. Herbert Taylor (died 1998)	Florida State University	1977
Howard Martin Temin (died 1994)	University of Wisconsin–Madison	1974
Jun-ichi Tomizawa (died 2017)	National Institute of Genetics	1995
Bik Kwoon Tye	Cornell University	2023
Anne Villeneuve (scientist)	Stanford University School of Medicine	2017
Graham C. Walker	MIT	2013
James D. Watson (died 2025)	Cold Spring Harbor Laboratory	1962
Reed Wickner	NIH	2000
Fred Winston	Harvard University	2013
Evelyn Witkin (died 2023)	Rutgers, The State University of New Jersey, New Brunswick	1977
Sewall Wright (died 1988)	University of Wisconsin-Madison	1934
Élie Wollman (died 2008)	Institut Pasteur	1991
Mariana Wolfner	Cornell University	2019
William B. Wood III (died 2024)	University of Colorado at Boulder	1972
Mitsuhiro Yanagida	Okinawa Institute of Science and Technology	2012
Charles Yanofsky (died 2018)	Stanford University	1966
Virginia Zakian	Princeton University	2018
Phillip D. Zamore	UMass Chan Medical School	2023
Norton Zinder (died 2012)	Rockefeller University	1969
