= Mascha Benya =

Russian-born Jewish singer (1908–2007)

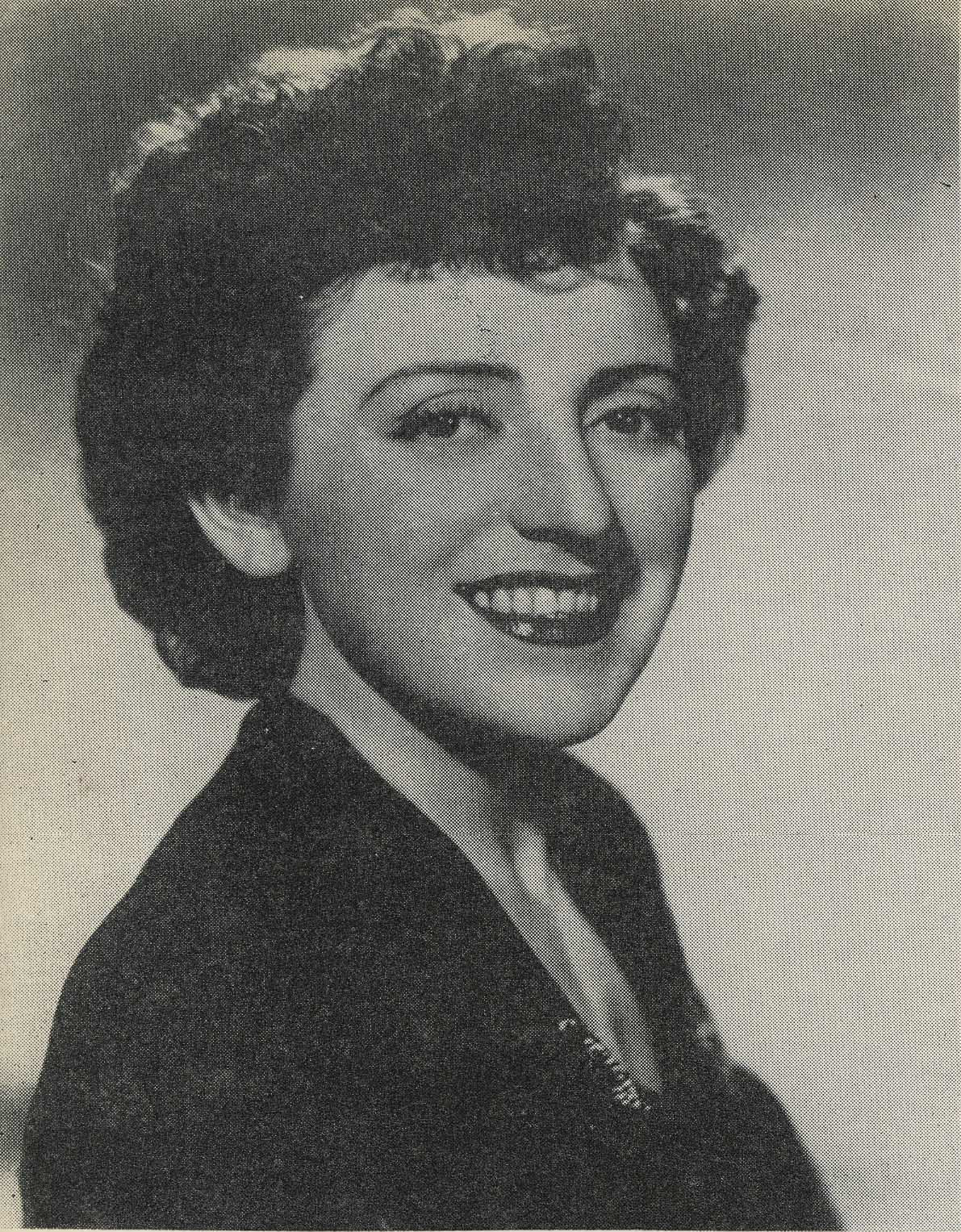
Masha Benya, c.1950

Mascha Benya (Yiddish: מאַשאַ בעניאַ, October 15, 1908 – November 4, 2007), born Masha Benyakonsky, was a Russian-born soprano known especially for her promotion and performance of Yiddish and Hebrew folk and art music in the United States after World War II. After a short career as an opera singer in the Jüdischer Kulturbund in 1930s Berlin, she emigrated to New York after Kristallnacht and became an important figure in the teaching of Yiddish and Hebrew song through the Workman's Circle, Kaufman Music Center, and other organizations, as well as a touring singer, radio performer, and recording artist.

== Biography ==
=== Early life ===
She was born Mascha Benyakonsky or Beniakonskyte in Virbalis, Suwałki Governorate, Russian Empire on October 15, 1908. She was born into a Jewish family; her father Arye Leyb was a merchant originally from Vilnius with a passion for Jewish music and Chazzans and opera in particular, and therefore Mascha grew up in a very musical family. Her mother was named Miriam and her siblings were David and Rachel. After graduating from a Hebrew language Gymnasium, she traveled to Prussia, first studying in a small town near the Russian border and then at the Stern Conservatory in Berlin. While studying there, she also worked informally as a Hebrew language teacher. Her voice teacher in Berlin was Franceschina Prevosti.

=== Music career ===
After finishing her schooling in Berlin and receiving positive reviews for her stage appearances, she came to the attention of choral director Chemjo Vinaver. He engaged her as the lead soprano in his production of Jacob Weinberg's Hehalutz. As antisemitic discrimination worsened in Nazi Germany, it was no longer possible for Jewish artists to perform for non-Jewish crowds, or to perform the work of "Aryan" composers. In the spring of 1937, Vinaver helped Mascha become involved in the Jüdischer Kulturbund, an organization that was established to support Jewish artists and to create cultural programs for Jewish audiences who were excluded from other performance venues. In that organization, she acted both as an opera performer and singer of Yiddish folksongs, as well as continuing to teach Hebrew to members who were considering emigrating to Mandatory Palestine, such as Martha Weltsch (the wife of Robert Weltsch). Among her successes in the Kulturbund were her performance of Jacques Offenbach material alongside the tenor Max Kuttner, and in stagings of Don Pasquale, Rigoletto and Si j'étais roi.

After Kristallnacht in November 1938, Mascha decided to finally leave Germany for the United States. She sailed from Cherbourg, France, to New York City in December 1938. Most of her friends and family in Lithuania were killed in the Holocaust. She soon involved herself in Jewish cultural affairs in New York City and shortened her name to Mascha or Masha Benya. Her earliest performances were at Bar mitsvahs, banquets and funerals. In February 1939 she performed as part of a benefit concert for Jewish refugees from Europe, which included such performers as Hans J. Heinz (tenor), Zina Alvers (mezzo-soprano), Sarah Gorby, and Jascha Bernstein (cellist). She also continued her vocal studies under new instructors, including Rhea Silberta, Sebastian Engelberg and Olga Ryss. The settings of her concerts became more prestigious, as she began to appear at schools, literary societies, and in front of Jewish organizations.

After the war, she turned increasingly away from opera and art music towards Yiddish folk songs and Jewish music education. She soon became recognized as a major figure in the dynamic postwar Yiddish music milieu, alongside such figures as Moishe Oysher, Jan Peerce, Seymour Rexite, Theodore Bikel, and Martha Schlamme. She became a naturalized US citizen in 1944. In 1949 she traveled to newly independent Israel and made her stage debut there. During the 1940s and 1950s she was a vocal supporter of Labor Zionism and often performed at benefits for organizations affiliated with it in the United States, such as Pioneer Women and Hadassah. She returned to Israel on another tour in 1954.

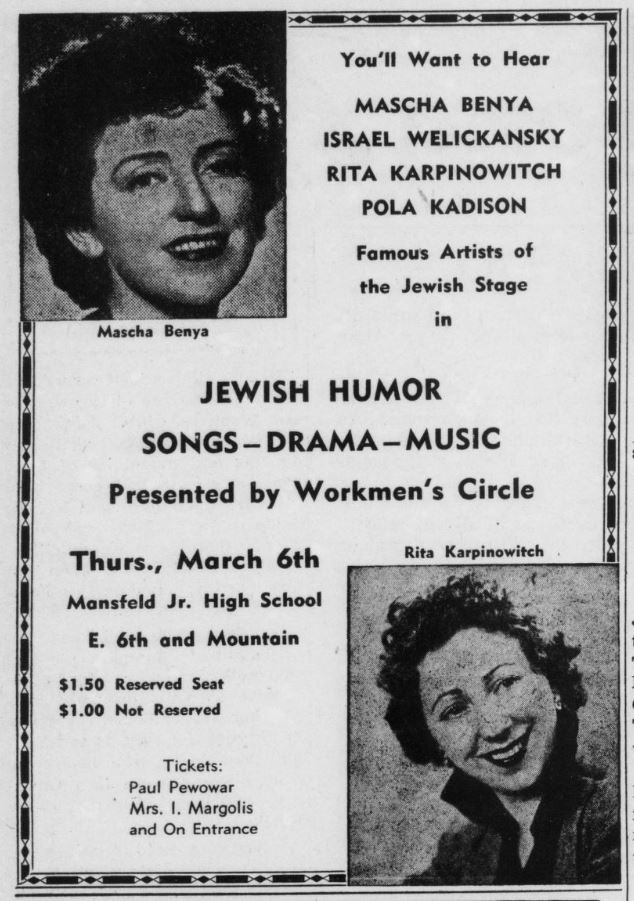
1952 advertisement for Workman's Circle tour

In the mid-1950s, she began to prepare to record an LP for ABC Records with Harry Anik accompanying her on piano, to be produced by Abe Lyman. However, both Anik and Lyman died before the album could be completed, and so it was never recorded, although rehearsal tapes for it were later released on audiocassette. In 1953 she also went on a tour of the United States and Canada with Nishka, Rita Karpinovich and the pianist Polia Kadison, followed by a 1954 tour organized by the Workmen's Circle in celebration of 300 years of Jewish life in the United States, with Israel Welichansky. She also performed in a popular radio program alongside Sidor Belarsky, created by the education department of the Workmen's Circle and Joseph Mlotek; it was eventually released as an LP in 1957 called Amol iz geven a mayse/Once Upon a Time. She had a regular Friday morning show The Folk Singer on WEVD, the station owned by the Jewish Daily Forward, from 1958 until some time in the early 1960s. In 1960 she also released another LP arranged by Joseph Mlotek, called Lomir zingen/Let's Sing A Yiddish Song! which she sang with a children's chorus.

In 1965, she married her husband Lazar Matz. She continued to tour and perform during the 1960s. In September 1970 she visited relatives in Vilnius, Lithuanian Soviet Socialist Republic, and was dismayed to see the deplorable condition of the Jewish community there.

In the 1980s and 1990s, Benya released another round of albums through Musique Internationale, a label founded by Barry Serota in 1969. It was through Serota's efforts that more of her music has been documented, including Jewish Song Treasury Vol I and Jewish Song Treasury Vol II (1984), The Art of Mascha Benya, and Mascha Benya: A Yiddish Song Recital Featuring the poetry of Itzik Manger (1997)

She was a longtime member and later a governing board member of the American Society for Jewish Music, and often gave lectures on Jewish art song at their conferences. She also became a coach, teacher and consultant for many artists and productions, especially in the New York area, on matters of Yiddish singing style, diction, and Jewish opera and art song, and an instructor at the Hebrew Arts School for Music and Dance.

She retired from the Hebrew Arts School and the Elane Kaufman Cultural Center in 1995, although she continued to coach singers until 2007. In 2005 she donated a scrapbook of photographs and clippings about her life as an artist with the Jüdischer Kulturbund to the United States Holocaust Memorial Museum. Other materials were donated to the Leo Baeck Institute.

She died in Queens, New York City, on November 4, 2007.

== Selected recordings ==
- Mascha Benya: A Yiddish Song Recital Featuring the poetry of Itzik Manger (Musique Internationale, 1997)
- Jewish Song Treasury Vol I (Musique Internationale, 1984, with accompaniment by Abraham Ellstein)
- אַמאָל איז געװען א מעתה Once Upon a Time (Artistic Enterprises, 1957, with Sidor Belarsky and Vladimir Heifetz)
- Jewish Song Treasury Vol II (Musique Internationale, 1984, with accompaniment by Abraham Ellstein)
- The Art of Mascha Benya (Musique Internationale)
- לאָמיר זינגען Let's Sing A Yiddish Song! A Treasury of Popular Children's Songs (Famous Records, arranged by Mikhl Gelbart)
- Nursery Rhymes (Kinder Velt)
- Songs for Jewish Children (Far Yiddishe Kinder Record Co.)
