= Melvin M. Green =

American geneticist (1916–2017)

- Born: Melvin Martin Green; August 24, 1916; Minneapolis, Minnesota, U.S.
- Died: October 24, 2017 (aged 101)
- Education: University of Minnesota
- Known for: Research on mutation, recombination, and transposable elements in Drosophila melanogaster
- Awards: Member, National Academy of Sciences (1980)
- Scientific career
- Fields: Genetics
- Workplaces: University of Missouri; University of California, Davis
- Thesis: (1942)
- Doctoral advisor: Clarence Paul Oliver

Melvin Martin Green (August 24, 1916 – October 24, 2017), commonly known as Mel Green, was an American geneticist known for his research on mutation, recombination, and transposable elements in Drosophila melanogaster. He was a professor of genetics at the University of California, Davis, where he was among the early members of the genetics faculty and contributed to the development of the department. He was elected a member of the National Academy of Sciences in 1980.

== Early life and education ==
Green was born in Minneapolis, Minnesota, on August 24, 1916. He attended the University of Minnesota, where he initially considered a career in history before turning to genetics after taking a course taught by Clarence Oliver. He completed a bachelor's degree in zoology and chemistry in 1938, followed by a master's degree in 1940 and a Ph.D. in zoology and biochemistry in 1942.

== Military service ==
During World War II, Green served in the United States Army. After initial assignment to basic duties, he entered officer training at the Medical Field Service School and was commissioned as a first lieutenant in 1943. He served in Europe and the Pacific, including France, Belgium, the Philippines, and Japan, and was discharged in 1946 with the rank of captain.

== Career ==
After the war, Green joined the faculty of the University of Missouri, where he began developing an independent research program in genetics. In 1950, he was recruited to the University of California, Davis as one of the early members of its genetics faculty, hired by G. Ledyard Stebbins to build the department.

At UC Davis, Green taught courses in general genetics, cytogenetics, human genetics, and the history of genetics, and mentored generations of students. He remained active in research and mentorship after his formal retirement in 1982.

== Research contributions ==
Green’s research focused on the genetic structure of genes, mutation, and recombination in Drosophila melanogaster. Early in his career, he investigated pseudoallelism, demonstrating that mutations at certain loci could behave as closely linked series rather than single functional units.

He conducted studies on radiation-induced mutation and reversion in Drosophila, demonstrating that X-rays could induce reverse mutations (reversions) as well as forward mutations, and that different classes of alleles exhibited distinct responses to irradiation.

Green is noted for his work on unstable mutations at the white locus in Drosophila, where he identified mobile genetic elements that could move within the genome. These studies provided one of the first demonstrations of transposable elements in Drosophila, extending concepts previously developed in plants by Barbara McClintock. Following this work, Green corresponded with McClintock regarding the interpretation of transposition in Drosophila, reflecting a close professional relationship between the two researchers.

He also investigated mutator systems and mechanisms of genetic instability, including elements that promoted recombination and insertional mutagenesis in natural populations. His work contributed to the understanding of gene structure, mutagenesis, and genome dynamics.

== Honors and recognition ==
Green was elected to the National Academy of Sciences in 1980 in recognition of his contributions to genetics. He received multiple fellowships, including Guggenheim and Fulbright fellowships, and held visiting appointments at institutions including Leiden University, the Max Planck Institute, and the University of Geneva.

In 2020, the UC Davis Life Sciences Building was renamed Melvin M. and Kathleen C. Green Hall in honor of the Green and his wife.

== Personal life ==
Green married Kathleen Cummings following his military service. She was also a biologist and the couple published together; she was active in civic life in Davis, California, including service on the city council. They had two sons, Jeremy and Jonathan.

Green died on October 24, 2017, at the age of 101.
