= Sydney Kustu =

Microbiologist

Sydney G. Kustu
- Born: March 18, 1943; Baltimore, Maryland
- Died: March 18, 2014 (aged 71); Berkeley, California
- Education: University of California, Davis
- Known for: discovery of bacterial two-component systems, regulation of Nitrogen metabolism in bacteria
- Awards: U.S. National Academy of Sciences (1993)
- Scientific career
- Fields: Bacteriology
- Workplaces: University of California, Berkeley
- Doctoral advisor: Jack Preiss

Sydney Govons Kustu (March 18, 1943 – March 18, 2014) was an American biologist and a professor of biochemistry at University of California, Berkeley. She is known for her pioneering research on the regulation of Nitrogen metabolism in bacteria.

== Academic career ==
At the early age of 15, she entered Radcliffe College, the all-female counterpart to Harvard, receiving her Bachelor of Arts degree in General Studies in 1963, making her among the first females to graduate from Harvard. She then studied as a technician with Saul Roseman at the University of Michigan, and received her doctorate in biochemistry from UC Davis in 1970, studying under Jack Preiss. She performed postdoctoral research at the UC Berkeley in the laboratory of Giovanna Ferro-Luzzi Ames. In 1973, UC Davis hired her as an assistant professor, and she was promoted to full professor in 1984. She was subsequently recruited to UC Berkeley in 1986, from which she retired in March 2010 and received Emeritus status.

== Scientific contributions ==
Among her contributions to microbial genetics and physiology, she worked on bacterial genes and how they are regulated due to the availability of nitrogen-containing compounds from their environment. She had found that strains of Salmonella typhimurium selected for utilization of D-histidine in place of L-histidine were frequently the result of mutations affecting glutamine synthetase (GS), a central enzyme in the pathways of nitrogen utilization.

In a series of paradigm-altering papers, Kustu along with her students proved that regulation GS synthesis and thus bacterial utilization of various nitrogen sources are mediated by a consortium of three regulatory proteins, which she named the Ntr system (for nitrogen regulatory): NtrA, NtrB, and NtrC. These proteins interact to repress or set off the synthesis of enzymes that catalyze the multiple routes of nitrogen utilization appropriate to extant conditions of the environment. Kustu also reported that NtrA was one of the first examples of an alternative sigma factor, and thus it can be claimed that Sydney was responsible for the discovery of RpoN or sigma 54, which it later became more widely known as.

== Awards and honors ==
In 1993, Sydney was elected to the U.S. National Academy of Sciences for her contributions to the field of Genetics.

Other awards include:

- elected fellow of American Academy of Arts and Sciences (AAAS) (1992)
- elected fellow of American Academy of Microbiology
- Gauss Professorship (Göttingen Academy of Sciences and Humanities|Göttingen Academy of Sciences)
- Miller Professorship (UC Berkeley) (2005-2006)
- NIH MERIT award (1986-2007)
- NSF Visiting Professorship for Women (1984)

== Death ==
On March 18, 2014, Sydney committed suicide on her 71st birthday, by swallowing the poisonous chemical, sodium azide. She was found by a maid in a room at the Berkeley City Club, along with a note to warn authorities about the dangerous substance having been used in the room, as well as a note with her personal information such as her laptop passcode. A bottle of research-grade sodium azide, likely obtained from her former laboratory, had been left on a table with its lid tightly secured. The unusual nature of her suicide prompted a major emergency response operation to evacuate the landmarked Julia Morgan-designed building. Sodium azide is a commonly used research chemical, used as a biocide to prevent unwanted bacterial growth in stock chemicals, as well as an inhibitor of cytochrome oxidase for studying the influence of oxidative respiration in gram-negative bacteria.
