= Ray Owen =

Ray Owen may refer to:

- Ray Owen (rugby league) (1940–2006), English rugby league player
- Ray Owen (politician) (1905–2003), Australian agricultural scientist and politician
- Ray David Owen (1915–2014), American teacher and scientist
- Ray Owen, vocalist with the band Juicy Lucy
