= Zinaida Alvers =

Russian singer

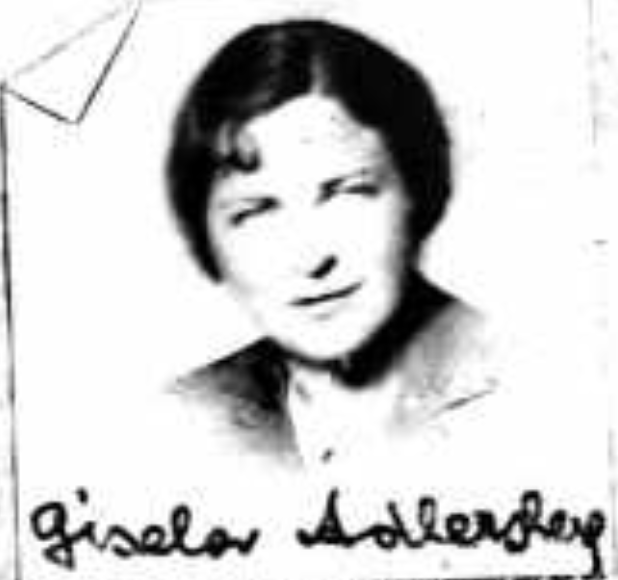
- Gisela Adlersberg, from a 1936 immigration form
- Born: Gitel Rakhel Magasanik; October 9, 1904; Berditchev, Russian Empire (now Berdychiv, Ukraine)
- Died: October 21, 1997 (aged 93)
- Other names: Zina Alvers, Zinaida Adlersberg, Gisela Magasanik, Gisela Adlersberg
- Occupation: Singer
- Relatives: Boris Magasanik (brother)

Zinaida Alvers (October 9, 1904 – October 21, 1997), also known as Zina Alvers, Gisela Magasanik, Gisela Adlersberg, and Zinaida Adlersberg, was a Russian-American contralto and mezzo-soprano singer and voice teacher.

== Early life and education ==
Alvers was born in Berditchev, Russia (now in Zhytomyr Oblast, Ukraine), the daughter of Naum Magasanik and Charlotte Schreiber Magasanik. Her younger brother Boris Magasanik was a biology professor at Massachusetts Institute of Technology. She studied voice with Walter Bricht.

== Career ==
Alvers sang at the Vienna Volksoper before she moved to New York City in the 1930s. Her voice was variously described as contralto or mezzo-soprano in its range. She was in the cast of Strauss's Salome at Lewisohn Stadium in 1937. In 1938 and 1939, she sang at benefit concerts by and for Jewish refugees at Mecca Temple, sharing the stage with singers Walter Bricht, Sidor Belarsky, Masha Benya and Sarah Gorby, violinists Arnold Eidus and Felix Galimir, writer George Backer, and others. In 1943, she appeared on Broadway in the musical revue Chauve-Souris, and in the casts the Russian operas Prince Igor, Rusalka, Eugene Onegin at Carnegie Hall.

Alvers gave concerts at New York's Town Hall venue in 1941, 1943, 1947 and 1948. In 1945, she was a soloist in a performance of Beethoven's Ninth Symphony at a music festival in South Carolina. In 1946, she was a soloist with the New York Philharmonic at Carnegie Hall, and at concerts of Russian music in Michigan and Indiana, sponsored by the American Russian Fraternal Society. She gave a concert for the Bronxville Women's Club in 1952, and an afternoon concert at Carnegie Recital Hall in 1958. "Her singing at its best has a communicative power that carries over the footlights," noted a reviewer in The New York Times.

== Personal life ==
In 1929, Alvers married physician and medical researcher David Adlersberg in Vienna; they had a daughter, Margaret. The Adlersbergs were naturalized as United States citizens in 1943. Her husband died in 1960, and she died in 1997.
