= Charles Boone =

Charles Boone may refer to:

- Charles Boone (governor) (died 1735), British governor of the Bombay Presidency, 1715–1722
- Charles Boone (composer) (born 1939), American composer
- Pat Boone (Charles Eugene Boone, born 1934), American singer, actor and writer
- Charles Boone (1652–1689), British member of parliament for Dartmouth
- Charles Boone (died 1735), British member of parliament for Ludgershall
- Charles Boone (died 1819) (1729–1819), British member of parliament for Castle Rising and Ashburton
- Lefty Boone (Charles Pernell Boone, 1920–1976), American baseball player
- Charles Boone (scientist), Canadian molecular geneticist
