= Edward Novitski Prize =

The Edward Novitski Prize is awarded by the Genetics Society of America (GSA) to recognize an extraordinary level of creativity and intellectual ingenuity in solving significant problems in genetics research.

Named in honor of Drosophila geneticist Edward Novitski (1918-2006), the award recognizes scientific achievement that stands out from the body of innovative work, that is deeply impressive to creative masters in the field, and that solves a difficult problem in genetics. It recognizes the beautiful and intellectually ingenious experimental design and execution involved in genetics scientific discovery.

The prize, established by the Novitski family, includes an engraved medal.

== Award recipients ==
- 2008 Thomas J. Silhavy
- 2009 Rodney J. Rothstein and Kent Golic
- 2010 Thomas W. Cline
- 2011 Abby F. Dernburg
- 2012 Dana Carroll
- 2013 Jonathan K. Pritchard
- 2014 Charles Boone
- 2015 Sue Biggins
- 2016 Leonid Kruglyak, HHMI and University of California, Los Angeles
- 2017 Jonathan Hodgkin
- 2018 Job Dekker
- 2019 Joseph Heitman
- 2020 Welcome Bender
- 2021 Feng Zhang
- 2022 Harmit Malik

== See also ==
- List of genetics awards
