= Thomas J. Silhavy =

American microbiologist

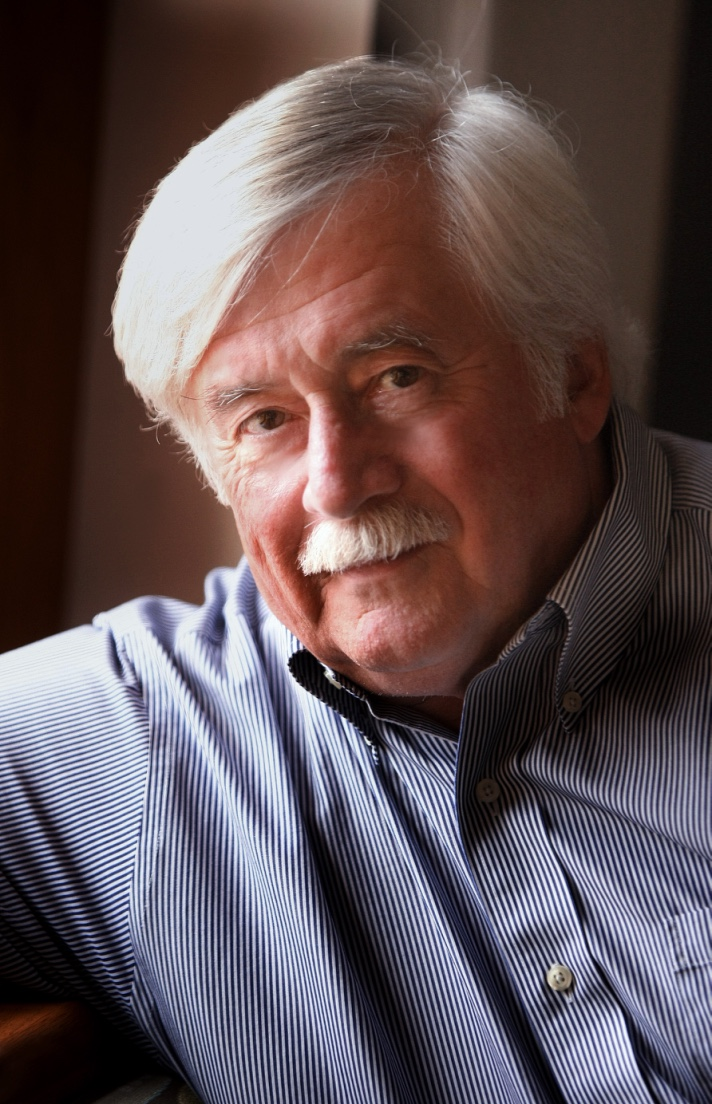
- Born: 1948 (age 77–78)
- Education: Ferris State University (BS); Harvard University (MS, PhD)
- Awards: Edward Novitski Prize in 2008
- Scientific career
- Fields: Molecular biology
- Workplaces: Princeton University

Thomas J. Silhavy (born 1948) is the Warner-Lambert Parke-Davis Professor of molecular biology at Princeton University. Silhavy is a bacterial geneticist who has made fundamental contributions to several different research fields. He is best known for his work on protein secretion, membrane biogenesis, and signal transduction. Using Escherichia coli as a model system, his lab was the first to isolate signal sequence mutations, identify a component of cellular protein secretion machinery, discover an integral membrane component of the outer membrane assembly machinery, and to identify and characterize a two-component regulatory system. Current work in his lab is focused on the mechanisms of outer membrane biogenesis and the regulatory systems that sense and respond to envelope stress and trigger the developmental pathway that allows cells to survive starvation. He is the author of more than 275 research articles and three books.

Silhavy was elected to the National Academy of Sciences in 2005.

== Honors ==
- 2019 Waksman Award for Excellence in Microbiology, ASM Theobald Smith Society
- 2016 American Society for Microbiology Lifetime Achievement Award
- 2011–2021 Editor-in-Chief, Journal of Bacteriology
- 2008 Genetics Society of America Novitski Prize
- 2008 Associate Member of the European Molecular Biology Organization (EMBO)
- 2005 Member of American Academy of Arts and Sciences
- 2005 Member of the National Academy of Sciences
- 2002 Graduate Microbiology Teaching Award from American Society for Microbiology
