= R. John Collier =

American microbiologist and biochemist

- Born: August 6, 1938 (age 88); Wichita Falls, Texas, USA
- Awards: Guggenheim Fellowship

Academic background
- Education: Rice University; Harvard University

Academic work
- Institutions: UCLA; Harvard Medical School

R. John Collier (born August 6, 1938) is an American microbiologist and biochemist. He is the Maude and Lillian Presley Professor of Microbiology and Immunobiology, Emeritus at Harvard Medical School.

== Early life and education ==
Collier was born in Wichita Falls, Texas on August 6, 1938. He earned a Bachelor of Arts from Rice University in 1959. He completed a Master of Science in 1961 and a Doctor of Philosophy in biology at Harvard University in 1964.

== Career ==
Collier was on the faculty at University of California, Los Angeles beginning in 1966. Collier held a Guggenheim Fellowship from 1973 to 1974 at Pasteur Institute. In 1984, he started at Harvard Medical School. He became the Maude and Lillian Presley Professor of Microbiology and Immunobiology in 1989. At Harvard, Collier served as the Faculty Dean for Graduate Education, Chairman of the Division of Medical Science and Acting Head of the Department of Microbiology and Molecular Genetics. He is a professor emeritus at Harvard.

== Awards and honors ==
In 1972, Collier won the Eli Lilly Award in Microbiology and Immunology from the American Society for Microbiology. He received the Paul Ehrlich and Ludwig Darmstaedter Prize in 1990. In 1991, he was elected into the National Academy of Sciences. Collier received the Selman A. Waksman Award in Microbiology in 1999. In 2003, he won the 13th Bristol-Myers Squibb Infectious Disease Research Award. Collier is an elected member of the American Academy of Arts and Sciences and the American Society for Microbiology.

== Personal life ==
Collier married in 1962 and has three daughters.
