= Thomas Hunt Morgan Medal =

Award for scientific achievement

- Awarded for: Lifetime achievement in the field of genetics
- Date: 1981
- Country: United States
- Presented by: Genetics Society of America
- Website: www.genetics-gsa.org/awards/thomashuntaward.shtml

The Thomas Hunt Morgan Medal is awarded by the Genetics Society of America (GSA) for lifetime contributions to the field of genetics.

The medal is named after Thomas Hunt Morgan, the 1933 Nobel Prize winner, who received this award for his work with Drosophila and his "discoveries concerning the role played by the chromosome in heredity." Morgan recognized that Drosophila, which could be bred quickly and inexpensively, had large quantities of offspring and a short life cycle, would make an excellent organism for genetic studies. His studies of the white-eye mutation and discovery of sex-linked inheritance provided the first experimental evidence that chromosomes are the carriers of genetic information. Subsequent studies in his laboratory led to the discovery of recombination and the first genetic maps.

In 1981 the GSA established the Thomas Hunt Morgan Medal for lifetime achievement to honor this classical geneticist who was among those who laid the foundation for modern genetics.

== Laureates ==
Source: Genetics Society of America

- 1981 Barbara McClintock (Nobel Prize in Physiology or Medicine)
  and Marcus M. Rhoades
- 1982 Sewall Wright
- 1983 Edward B. Lewis (Nobel Prize in Physiology or Medicine)
- 1984 George Wells Beadle (Nobel Prize in Physiology or Medicine)
  and R. Alexander Brink
- 1985 Herschel Roman
- 1986 Seymour Benzer
- 1987 James F. Crow
- 1988 Norman H. Giles
- 1989 Dan L. Lindsley
- 1990 Charles Yanofsky
- 1991 Armin Dale Kaiser
- 1992 Edward H. Coe, Jr.
- 1993 Ray D. Owen
- 1994 David D. Perkins
- 1995 Matthew Meselson
- 1996 Franklin W. Stahl
- 1997 Oliver E. Nelson Jr.
- 1998 Norman H. Horowitz
- 1999 Salome Waelsch
- 2000 Evelyn M. Witkin
- 2001 Yasuji Oshima
- 2002 Ira Herskowitz
- 2003 David S. Hogness
- 2004 Bruce N. Ames
- 2005 Robert L. Metzenberg
- 2006 Masatoshi Nei
- 2007 Oliver Smithies (Nobel Prize in Physiology or Medicine)
- 2008 Michael Ashburner
- 2009 John Roth
- 2010 Alexander Tzagoloff
- 2011 James E. Haber
- 2012 Kathryn V. Anderson
- 2013 Thomas D. Petes
- 2014 Frederick M. Ausubel, Harvard Medical School and Massachusetts General Hospital
- 2015 Brian Charlesworth, University of Edinburgh
- 2016 Nancy Kleckner, Harvard University
- 2017 Richard Lewontin, Harvard University
- 2018 Barbara J. Meyer, University of California, Berkeley
- 2019 Daniel Hartl, Harvard University
- 2020 David Botstein, Calico Labs and Gerald Fink, Whitehead Institute, MIT
- 2021 Ruth Lehmann, Whitehead Institute and Massachusetts Institute of Technology
- 2022 Michael Lynch, Biodesign Center for Mechanisms of Evolution, Arizona State University
- 2023 No award given
- 2024 Paul Sternberg, California Institute of Technology
- 2025 Joanne Chory, Salk Institute for Biological Studies

== See also ==
- List of genetics awards
