= Clarence Paul Oliver =

American geneticist

- Born: November 8, 1898; Dexter, Missouri
- Died: July 10, 1991 (aged 92)
- Education: University of Texas
- Known for: Human genetics and pseudoallelism
- Scientific career
- Fields: Genetics
- Workplaces: University of Minnesota; University of Texas at Austin
- Doctoral advisor: Hermann Joseph Muller

Clarence Paul Oliver (November 8, 1898 – July 10, 1991), known to his friends as "Pete", was an American geneticist. Born in Dexter, Missouri, he attended college at University of Texas receiving a BA in 1925. He continued his studies at University of Texas completing a PhD in the laboratory of Hermann Joseph Muller in 1931. From 1932 to 1946 he was a member of the faculty of University of Minnesota where future nobelist Edward B. Lewis worked in his lab as an undergraduate. From 1946 to his retirement in 1971, he was a faculty member at University of Texas, where he studied human genetics and pseudoallelism.

== Professional accomplishments ==
- Founding member of the American Society of Human Genetics (1948)
- President of the American Society of Human Genetics (1953)
- Secretary of the Genetics Society of America (1953- 1955)
- President of the Genetics Society of America (1958)
- Editor of the journal Genetics (1957-1963)
- Ashbel Smith Professor at the University of Texas

== Sources ==
- University of Texas Scholarship Page
- In Memoriam Clarence Paul Oliver, memorial resolution of the University of Texas Austin Faculty Council
