= Ralph Stoner Wolfe =

American microbiologist (1921–2019)

- Born: 18 July 1921; New Windsor, Maryland
- Died: 26 March 2019 (aged 97); Urbana, Illinois
- Education: Bridgewater College (B.S.); University of Pennsylvania (M.S., PhD)
- Awards: Selman A. Waksman Award in Microbiology (1995)
- Scientific career
- Fields: Microbiology
- Workplaces: University of Illinois Urbana-Champaign

Ralph Stoner Wolfe (July 18, 1921, New Windsor, Maryland – March 26, 2019, Urbana, Illinois) was an American microbiologist, who contributed to the discovery of the single-celled archaea as the third domain of life. He was a pioneer in the biochemistry of methanogenesis.

== Biography ==
Wolfe graduated in 1942 with a bachelor's degree in biology from Bridgewater College, where his father was a teacher. Ralph Wolfe earned a master's degree in bacteriology from the University of Pennsylvania and then worked for several years in a laboratory. He returned to the University of Pennsylvania and graduated there in 1953 with a Ph.D. in bacteriology. In the department of bacteriology at the University of Illinois at Urbana–Champaign, he became an instructor in 1953, an assistant professor in 1955, an associate professor in 1957, and a full professor in 1961, retiring as professor emeritus in 1991.

His major research interests concerned anaerobic microbes and he developed methods and designed tools that enabled research on these organisms. Research conducted in his laboratory elucidated the biochemistry of methanogenesis, the metabolic process by which a unique group of anaerobes make methane. These studies led to the discovery of new organisms and unique metabolic pathways that involve six novel coenzymes and unprecedented biochemistry. The methanogens were the first organisms to be recognized as belonging to a new third domain of life, the Archaea. (This work was done in collaboration with Carl Woese.)

His 1979 paper written in collaboration with Woese and 3 other microbiologists has over 3,000 citations.

Wolfe was awarded Guggenheim Fellowships for the academic years 1960–1961 and 1975–1976. In 1981, he was elected to the National Academy of Sciences, as well as the American Academy of Arts and Sciences. In 1995, the National Academy of Sciences gave him the Selman A. Waksman Award in Microbiology for "elucidating the biochemical pathway of the reduction of carbon dioxide to methane in microorganisms and in the course of this work defining new biochemical pathways, enzymes, and cofactors." The American Society of Microbiology gave hime three awards.

He married Gretka Young in September 1950. Upon his death he was survived by his widow, a daughter, two sons, four grandchildren, and one great-grandchild.

== Selected publications ==
- Valentine, R. C.; Brill, W. J.; Wolfe, R. S. (1962). "Role of Ferredoxin in Pyridine Nucleotide Reduction". Proceedings of the National Academy of Sciences. 48 (10): 1856–1860. Bibcode:1962PNAS...48.1856V. doi:10.1073/pnas.48.10.1856. PMC 221051. PMID 16591011.
- Fox, G. E.; Magrum, L. J.; Balch, W. E.; Wolfe, R. S.; Woese, C. R. (1977). "Classification of methanogenic bacteria by 16S ribosomal RNA characterization". Proceedings of the National Academy of Sciences. 74 (10): 4537–4541. Bibcode:1977PNAS...74.4537F. doi:10.1073/pnas.74.10.4537. PMC 431980. PMID 16592452.
- Ellefson, W. L.; Whitman, W. B.; Wolfe, R. S. (1982). "Nickel-containing factor F430: Chromophore of the methylreductase of Methanobacterium". Proceedings of the National Academy of Sciences. 79 (12): 3707–3710. Bibcode:1982PNAS...79.3707E. doi:10.1073/pnas.79.12.3707. PMC 346495. PMID 6954513.
- Nagle, D. P.; Wolfe, R. S. (1983). "Component a of the methyl coenzyme M methylreductase system of Methanobacterium: Resolution into four components". Proceedings of the National Academy of Sciences. 80 (8): 2151–2155. Bibcode:1983PNAS...80.2151N. doi:10.1073/pnas.80.8.2151. PMC 393775. PMID 6403944.
- Escalante-Semerena, J. C.; Leigh, J. A.; Rinehart, K. L.; Wolfe, R. S. (1984). "Formaldehyde activation factor, tetrahydromethanopterin, a coenzyme of methanogenesis". Proceedings of the National Academy of Sciences. 81 (7): 1976–1980. Bibcode:1984PNAS...81.1976E. doi:10.1073/pnas.81.7.1976. PMC 345419. PMID 16593444.
- Noll, K. M.; Rinehart, K. L.; Tanner, R. S.; Wolfe, R. S. (1986). "Structure of component B (7-mercaptoheptanoylthreonine phosphate) of the methylcoenzyme M methylreductase system of Methanobacterium thermoautotrophicum". Proceedings of the National Academy of Sciences. 83 (12): 4238–4242. Bibcode:1986PNAS...83.4238N. doi:10.1073/pnas.83.12.4238. PMC 323707. PMID 3086878.
- Ossmer, R.; Mund, T.; Hartzell, P. L.; Konheiser, U.; Kohring, G. W.; Klein, A.; Wolfe, R. S.; Gottschalk, G.; Mayer, F. (1986). "Immunocytochemical localization of component C of the methylreductase system in Methanococcus voltae and Methanobacterium thermoautotrophicum". Proceedings of the National Academy of Sciences. 83 (16): 5789–5792. Bibcode:1986PNAS...83.5789O. doi:10.1073/pnas.83.16.5789. ISSN 0027-8424. PMC 386380. PMID 16593743.
- Hartzell, P. L.; Wolfe, R. S. (1986). "Requirement of the nickel tetrapyrrole F430 for in vitro methanogenesis: Reconstitution of methylreductase component C from its dissociated subunits". Proceedings of the National Academy of Sciences. 83 (18): 6726–6730. Bibcode:1986PNAS...83.6726H. doi:10.1073/pnas.83.18.6726. PMC 386582. PMID 3462721.
- Bobik, T. A.; Wolfe, R. S. (1988). "Physiological importance of the heterodisulfide of coenzyme M and 7-mercaptoheptanoylthreonine phosphate in the reduction of carbon dioxide to methane in Methanobacterium". Proceedings of the National Academy of Sciences. 85 (1): 60–63. Bibcode:1988PNAS...85...60B. doi:10.1073/pnas.85.1.60. PMC 279481. PMID 3124103.
- Metcalf, W. W.; Zhang, J. K.; Apolinario, E.; Sowers, K. R.; Wolfe, R. S. (1997). "A genetic system for Archaea of the genus Methanosarcina: Liposome-mediated transformation and construction of shuttle vectors". Proceedings of the National Academy of Sciences. 94 (6): 2626–2631. Bibcode:1997PNAS...94.2626M. doi:10.1073/pnas.94.6.2626. PMC 20139. PMID 9122246.
- Mukhopadhyay, B.; Johnson, E. F.; Wolfe, R. S. (2000). "A novel p_{H_{2}} control on the expression of flagella in the hyperthermophilic strictly hydrogenotrophic methanarchaeaon Methanococcus jannaschii". Proceedings of the National Academy of Sciences. 97 (21): 11522–11527. Bibcode:2000PNAS...9711522M. doi:10.1073/pnas.97.21.11522. PMC 17233. PMID 11027352.
