= Yasuji Oshima =

Japanese geneticist

Yasuji Oshima (born 1932) is a Japanese geneticist.

== Academics ==
Oshima graduated from Osaka University's Department of Fermentation Technology in 1955, and later received his doctorate in 1960 from the same program. For postdoctoral research, Oshima traveled to Carbondale, Il to work with Dr. Carl Lindegren in the emerging field of yeast genetics between 1963-1965. After the research concluded, Oshima returned to Japan and worked for Suntory ltd. as a researcher from 1965-1970.

In 1970, Oshima returned to Osaka University as a faculty member in the Department of Fermentation Technology. Later in 1990, he became the director of the International Center of Cooperative Research and Development in Biotechnology at Osaka University, later becoming a professor at Kansai University in 1996, where he has stayed through to the present day.

Starting in 1973, he has also served as director and active member of the Society of Fermentation and Bio-engineering.

== Awards ==
Yasuji Oshima was awarded the GSA Thomas Hunt Morgan Medal in 2001, which recognizes a lifetime contribution to the field of genetics.
