= Selman A. Waksman Award in Microbiology =

Award conferred by the U.S. National Academy of Sciences

The Selman A. Waksman Award in Microbiology is awarded by the U.S. National Academy of Sciences "in recognition of excellence in the field of microbiology." Named after Selman Waksman, it was first awarded in 1968. A $5000 prize is included in the honor.

== Winners ==
Source: National Academy of Sciences

- Rotem Sorek (2025) for groundbreaking discoveries on the immune system of bacteria.
- Nancy A. Moran (2023)
- Pascale Cossart (2021)

For her pioneering contributions to the field of cellular microbiology and her fundamental work uncovering novel mechanisms that govern the interplay between the pathogenic intracellular bacterium Listeria and its mammalian host, as well as her many contributions to supporting microbiology worldwide.

- Sharon R. Long (2019)

For pioneering research defining the molecular mechanisms underlying the important nitrogen-fixing symbiosis between Rhizobium and legumes, research that has had major implications for microbe-host interactions in general.

- Bernard Roizman (2017)

For his many seminal contributions to understanding the mechanisms by which herpes viruses replicate and cause disease.

- Susan Gottesman (2015)

For transforming our understanding of post-transcriptional regulation in bacteria through mechanisms of controlled proteolysis and small RNAs.

- Jeffrey Gordon (2013)

For his pioneering interdisciplinary studies on the human microbiome and for defining the genomic and metabolic foundations of its contributions to health and disease.

- Carol A. Gross (2011)

For her pioneering studies on mechanisms of gene transcription and its control, and for defining the roles of sigma factors during homeostasis and under stress.

- Jonathan Beckwith (2009)

For fundamental contributions to gene regulation, protein targeting and secretion, and disulfide biochemistry, and also for the development of gene fusions as an experimental tool.

- Richard M. Losick (2007)

For discovering alternative bacterial sigma factors and his fundamental contributions to understanding the mechanism of bacterial sporulation.

- Lucy Shapiro (2005)

For her pioneering work revealing the bacterial cell as an integrated system with transcriptional circuitry interwoven with the 3-D deployment of regulatory and morphological proteins.

- Stanley Falkow (2003)

For his many contributions to understanding the mechanisms by which bacteria cause infection and disease.

- Norman R. Pace (2001)

For revolutionizing microbiology by developing methods by which microorganisms can be directly detected, identified, and phylogenetically related without the need for cultivation in the laboratory.

- R. John Collier (1999)

For his seminal contribution to the understanding of bacterial pathogenesis by the elucidation of the action of the diphtheria toxin.

- Carl R. Woese (1997)

For discovering a kingdom of life, the Archaea—using ribosomal RNA sequences for phylogenetic studies of microorganisms—which has influenced concepts of evolution and microbial ecology and has had major technical and industrial applications.

- Ralph S. Wolfe (1995)

For elucidating the biochemical pathway of the reduction of carbon dioxide to methane in microorganisms and in the course of this work defining new biochemical pathways, enzymes, and cofactors.

- Boris Magasanik (1993)

For his contributions to our understanding of catabolite repression, amino acid metabolism, and regulation of nitrogen metabolism in bacteria.

- Melvin I. Simon (1991)

For his discoveries in the field of bacterial chemotaxis, including the elucidation of flagellar phase variation and of flagellar motor activation by receptor-mediated signals transmitted through protein-phosphoryl-group transfers.

- Bernard D. Davis (1989)

For his ingenious development of the penicillin technique for isolating mutants and leadership in its application to microbial physiology.

- Harland G. Wood (1986)

For his classic studies in mechanisms of carbon dioxide fixation in heterotrophic bacteria, which have spanned a half century and have revolutionized our understanding of the biochemical roles of carbon dioxide.

- Purnell W. Choppin (1984)

For his discoveries of new mechanisms in the replication of myxo- and paramyxoviruses, in viral pathogenesis, and in viral gene expression.

- Irwin C. Gunsalus (1982)

For his pioneering studies in microbial biochemistry.

- Julius Adler (1980)

For his pioneering studies on motility and chemotaxis in bacteria.

- Howard Green (1978)

For his fundamental contributions to the biology of cultured animal cells.

- Sidney Pestka (1977)

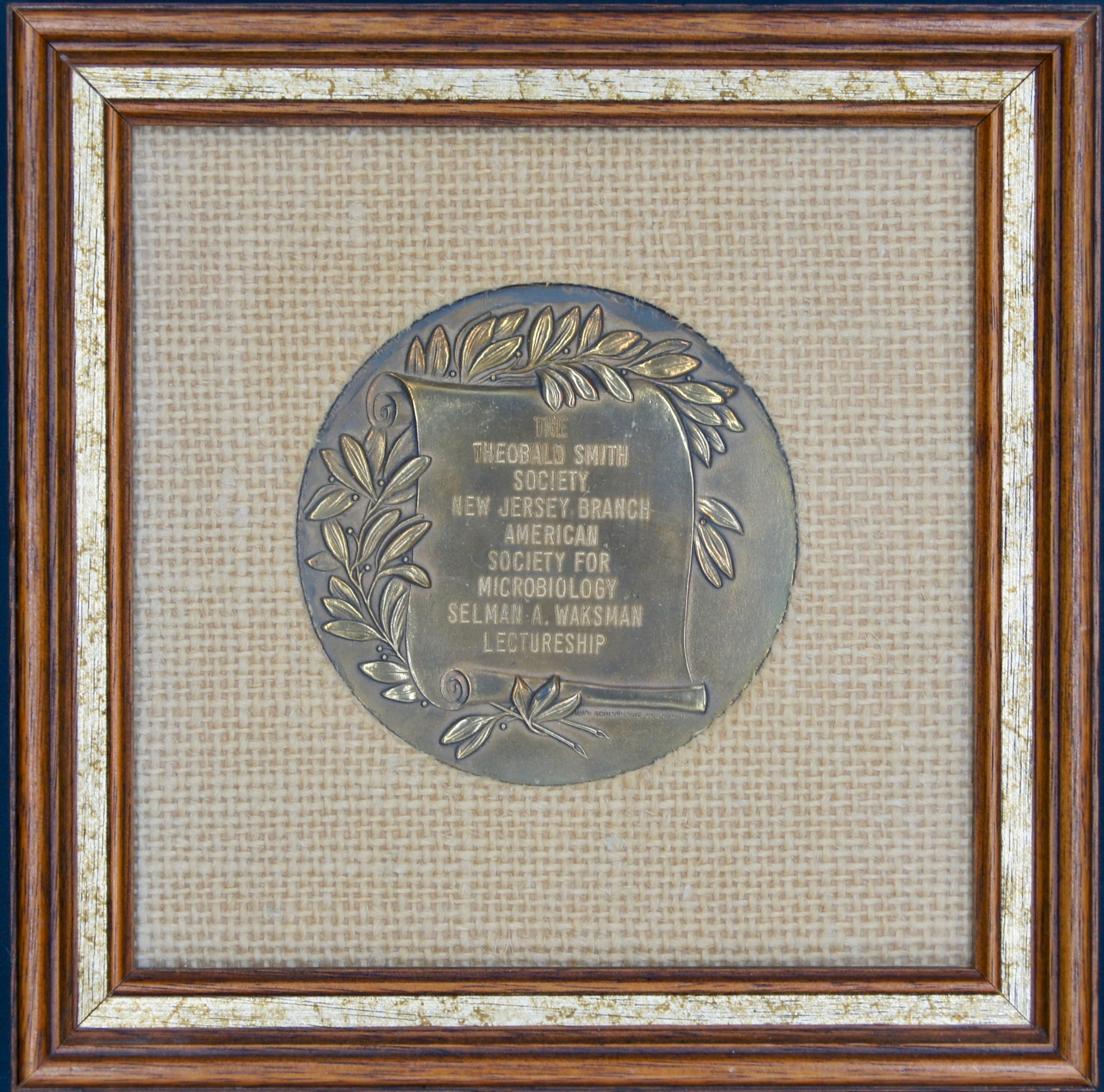
1977 Selman A. Waxman Award Medal - Front View

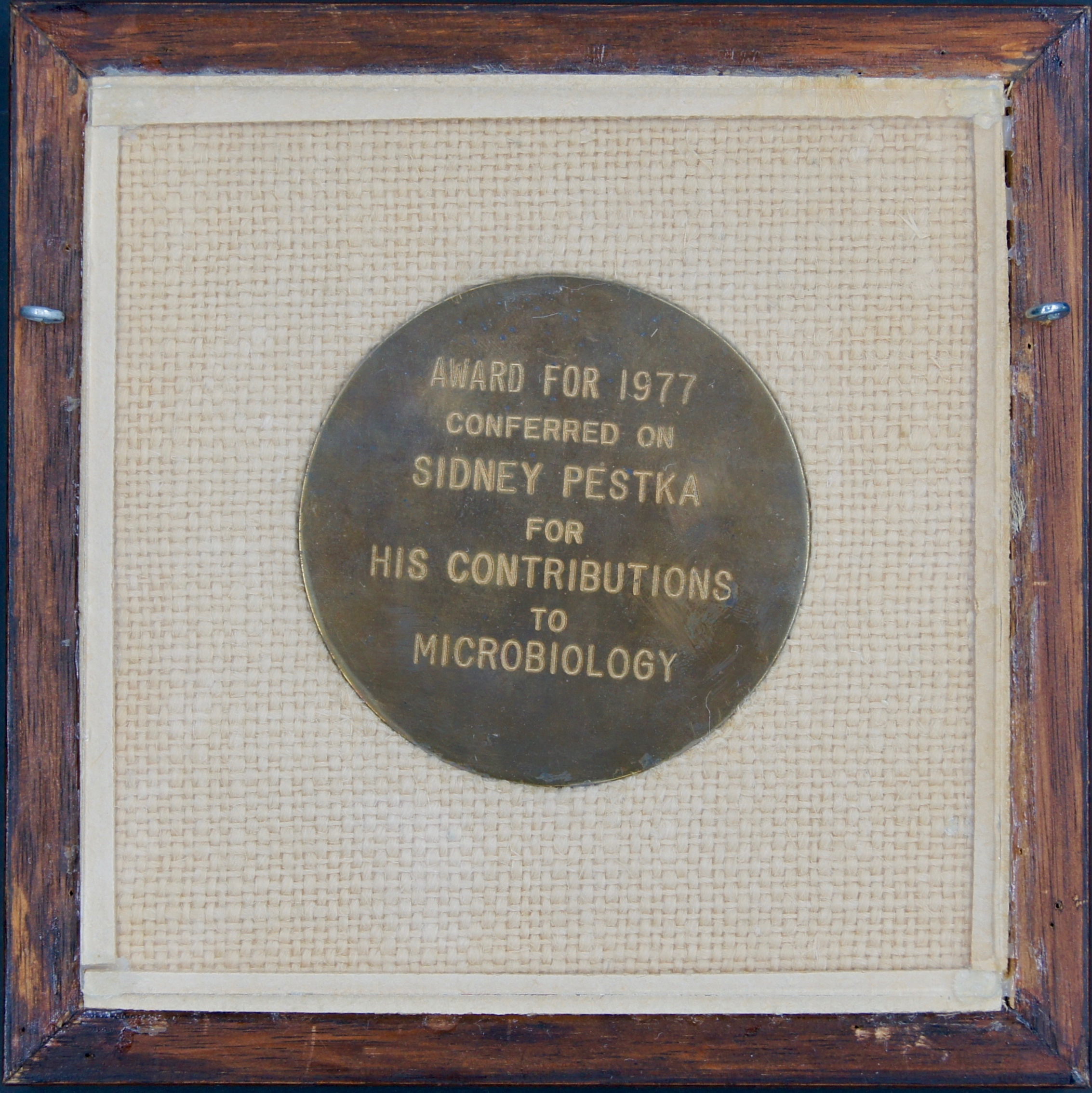
1977 Selman A. Waxman Award Medal - Rear View

For his contributions to microbiology.

- Wallace P. Rowe (1976)

For his fundamental contributions to our understanding of the biology of oncogenic viruses.

- Renato Dulbecco (1974)

For his extension to animal viruses the precise quantitative methods that had been developed with bacterial viruses, thereby revealing the integration of tumor viruses into host chromosomes.

- Charles Yanofsky (1972)

For his outstanding contributions to many aspects of microbial and molecular genetics.

- Earl Reece Stadtman (1970)

For his outstanding contributions in the field of microbial biochemistry.

- Jack L. Strominger (1968)

For his elegant studies on the biosynthesis of the bacterial cell wall and the mode of action of antibiotics.

== See also ==
- List of biology awards
- Prizes named after people
