= Edward Novitski =

American geneticist

- Born: July 24, 1918; Wilkes-Barre, Pennsylvania
- Died: June 29, 2006 (aged 87)
- Education: Purdue University, California Institute of Technology (Caltech)
- Known for: Work on Drosophila genetics
- Awards: Guggenheim Fellowship; the Edward Novitski Prize was named in his honour
- Scientific career
- Fields: Drosophila genetics
- Institutions: University of Rochester, University of Missouri, Caltech, University of Oregon, Oak Ridge National Laboratory

Edward Novitski (July 24, 1918 – June 29, 2006) was an American geneticist. He won a Guggenheim Fellowship in 1945, and 1974. The Edward Novitski Prize was named for him.

== Life ==
He was born in Wilkes-Barre. He experimented with Drosophila in high school, and his later research mainly concerned Drosophila genetics, both at the beginning of his career, and also at the end. He graduated from Purdue University, and California Institute of Technology. He did research at the University of Rochester, University of Missouri, and at Caltech. From 1951 to 1956, he taught at the University of Missouri. He led the Drosophila genetics group at Oak Ridge National Laboratory. From 1958 to 1983, he taught at the University of Oregon.

In addition to his work on Drosophila genetics, Novitski also concerned himself with more general matters, such as R. A. Fisher's conclusion that Mendel's results with the garden pea were "too good to be true".

== Works ==
- Genetics and biology of Drosophila, 1976
- Human genetics, 1977
- Sturtevant and Dobzhansky Two Scientists at Odds, 2005
