= Carol Gross =

American molecular biologist

- Education: Cornell University; Brooklyn College; University of Oregon
- Spouse: Harrison Echols
- Scientific career
- Workplaces: University of Wisconsin Madison; University of California San Francisco

Carol A. Gross is a molecular biologist and professor of cell and tissue biology at the University of California San Francisco (UCSF). Her research focuses on transcriptional regulation in bacteria.

== Research and career ==
At UCSF Dr. Carol A. Gross runs a lab that takes genetic, biochemical, and systems approaches to study regulatory mechanisms of E. coli stress responses, protein interactions in the bacterial transcription apparatus, and genome-wide control of gene expression. She is a Member of the National Academy of Sciences, a Fellow of the American Academy of Arts and Sciences, and a Fellow of the American Association for the Advancement of Science (AAAS)

Among her notable contributions to the field of microbiology was the discovery, in collaboration with several other scientists, of the Extracytoplasmic Function (ECF) σ factors, proteins that subsequently emerged as the largest group of alternative σ factors and one of the three major pillars of signal transduction in bacteria, alongside one- and two-component systems.

Gross studied botany at Cornell University, then obtained a masters' degree in science education at Brooklyn College. She then went on to earn a PhD in 1968 from the University of Oregon at the Institute of Molecular Biology under the biophysicist Aaron Novick.

As of mid-2023 Gross had authored or co-authored 176 academic publications dating back to 1974. Her most recent co-authored scientific journal article was published in April 2023. She serves as Principal Investigator for a study funded by the National Institutes of Health studying cellular homeostasis pathways in bacteria.

As a distinguished professor and researcher Gross has been recognized for her commitment to and advocacy for diversity in STEM education.

Before working at UCSF, Gross was a postdoctoral researcher and then faculty member at the University of Wisconsin Madison.

== Personal life ==
Gross grew up in Brooklyn, New York, and was encouraged to pursue her scientific interests by a high school biology teacher.

Gross married Harrison Echols, also a molecular biologist. After his death in 1993 she edited and published his book, Operators and Promoters: The Story of Molecular Biology and Its Creators, about the birth and early development of the field of molecular biology.

Gross told an interviewer in 2017 that she is Jewish, that her family "wasn't very wealthy," and that she "didn't grow up thinking that life was fair." She recounted: "When I went to Cornell, I ended up taking the worst physics course, and one semester of the organic chemistry course because I couldn’t afford to pay more to take additional classes." Gross gave birth soon after starting her PhD studies, and recalls that her advisor warned her that it was not possible to be both a good scientist and a good mother, but that he supported her when she said she would not give up. After she finished her PhD, he told her: “Carol, you really changed my mind.” Informed by her own life experiences she started a faculty diversity committee at UCSF and helped reconfigure a basic sciences summer program for diverse students.

== Awards ==
- 1992 Elected to the National Academy of Sciences
- 1993 American Association for the Advancement of Science Mentoring Award
- 2011 Selman A. Waksman Award in Microbiology
- 2016 Alice C. Evans Award for Advancement of Women, American Society for Microbiology
- 2019 Lifetime Achievement Award, American Society for Microbiology
