= Sue Biggins =

American cell biologist

- Born: 1968 (age 57–58)
- Education: Stanford University, Princeton University
- Awards: American Academy of Arts & Sciences; Edward Novitski Prize
- Scientific career
- Fields: Cell biology
- Workplaces: Fred Hutchinson Cancer Research Center, University of Washington

Sue Biggins (born 1968) is an American cell biologist who studies kinetochores and the transfer of chromosomes during cell division. Her team isolated kinetochores from cells, enabling them to be studied separately under laboratory conditions. They also discovered that tension helps kinetochores to attach to microtubules and move from the mother cell to the daughter cells when cells divide. The methodology and concepts she developed for yeast kinetochores are being adopted in laboratories around the world. Biggins was elected to the American Academy of Arts & Sciences (AAAS) in 2018.

== Education ==
Biggins received her BS in biology in 1990 from Stanford University and her Ph.D. in Molecular Biology in 1995 at Princeton University.

== Career ==
Biggins is currently the director and a full member of the basic sciences division at Fred Hutchinson Cancer Research Center as well as an affiliate professor for the department of biochemistry at the University of Washington.

She was elected to the National Academy of Sciences in 2015 and to the American Academy of Arts & Sciences in 2018. She received the National Academy of Sciences Award in Molecular Biology in 2013.

Biggins has also received a Beckman Young Investigators Award in 2003. Biggins is also a Howard Hughes Medical Institute Investigator. She was awarded the Novitski Prize of the Genetics Society of America in 2015.
