= Robert Metzenberg =

American geneticist

Robert L. Metzenberg
- Born: June 11, 1930; Chicago, Illinois
- Died: July 15, 2007 (aged 77); Los Angeles, California
- Education: California Institute of Technology
- Known for: Genetics of Neurospora crassa RFLP mapping Meiotic silencing
- Awards: Thomas Hunt Morgan Medal (2005)
- Scientific career
- Fields: Genetics
- Workplaces: University of Wisconsin–Madison

Robert Lee Metzenberg (June 11, 1930 – July 15, 2007) was an American geneticist known for his work on genetic regulation and metabolism with Neurospora crassa.

== Education and early life ==
Robert Lee Metzenberg was born in Chicago, Illinois, USA. In 1951 Metzenberg graduated from Pomona College in California where he had specialised in chemistry with physics and biology as minor subjects. He then studied at the California Institute of Technology and was awarded a Ph.D. in 1955. 1951 and 1955, he earned a PhD at California Institute of Technology in the Division of Biological Sciences supervised by Herschel K. Mitchell. During this time he met and was influenced by several geneticists including George Beadle, Alfred Sturtevant, Herschel K. Mitchell and Max Delbrück.

== Career ==
In 1955 Metzenberg was appointed as a professor at the University of Wisconsin where he remained until he retired in 1996. In 1977 he was appointed the John Bascom Professor by the University of Wisconsin Board of Regents. From 1996 he was a research professor at Stanford University and was also an adjunct professor at California State University Northridge, from 2005. He continued laboratory research at his home until the day he died in 2007. He was funded by the National Institutes of Health and the National Science Foundation continuously from 1961 until his death.

His research, using the fungus Neurospora crass, was essential for its continued development as a model organism in the latter half of the twentieth century, and he became a central point in the research community. Metzenberg and his collaborators studied sulphur and phosphate assimilation, uncovering the complex genetic control of these pathways. They also created the first molecular map of the Nurospora genome, making use of the dispersed 5S rRNA genes and technology that was an early independent implement of RFLP analysis. This led to the application of molecular genetic technologies to advance understanding of Neurospora. It became the first filamentous fungus to have a fully sequenced genome. His research group characterised the mating-type A allele of N. crassa. From the mid-1990s he also uncovered a novel gene-silencing mechanism, meiotic silencing of unpaired DNA (MSUD), that was related to RNAi and explained many previously unexplained aberrations in meiosis in Neurospora and other fungi.

== Awards and honors ==
He was awarded the Thomas Hunt Morgan Award from Caltech in 1954 and the American Cancer Society and John and Mary Markle postdoctoral awards during his postdoctoral research. He received a U.S. Public Health Service Research Career Development Award for the period 1963–1973. He was president of the Genetics Society of America in 1990 and elected as a fellow of the American Academy of Microbiology in 1996. He was elected a member of the National Academy of Sciences in 1997. In 2005 he was awarded the Thomas Hunt Morgan Medal by the Genetics Society of America for his lifetimes achievements.

== Personal life ==
He met Helene Fox from California, while he was studying for his Ph.D. They married in 1954. Together, they had two children. After his retirement, they returned to California in 2002.

== Legacy ==
In 2004, the Neurospora research community established an award in his name. This is awarded every 2 – 4 years for innovative research that has significantly advanced understanding of Neurospora and biology in general by a researcher at any stage of career development. Awardees have included N. Louise Glass in 2019.
