= Harmit Malik =

Indian American evolutionary biologist

Harmit Singh Malik
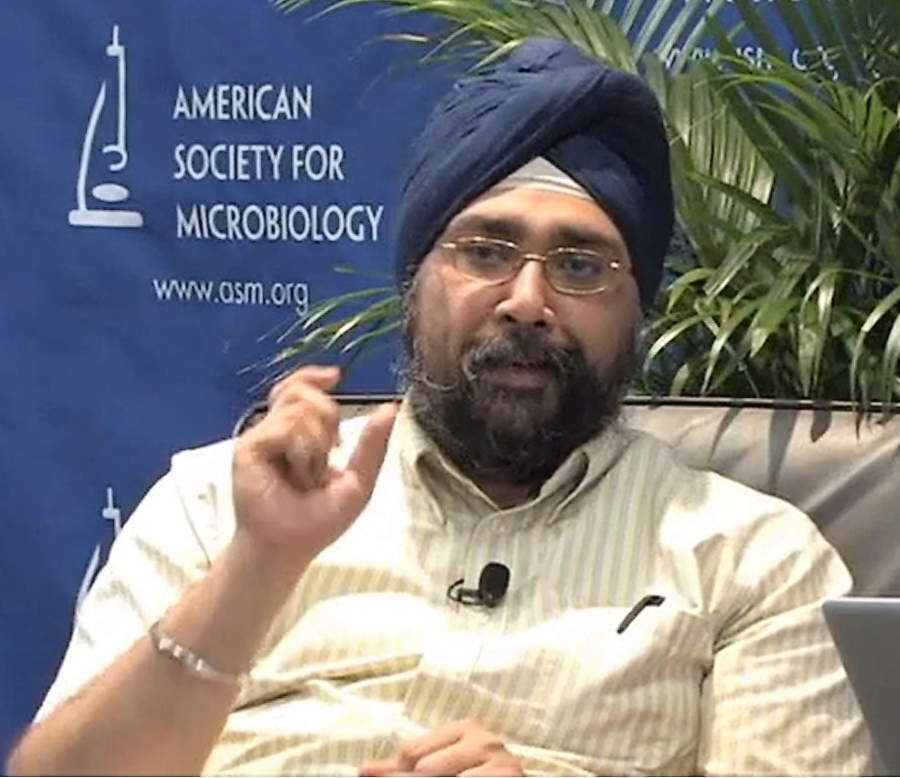
- Malik at the 2011 American Society for Microbiology General Meeting in New Orleans
- Born: 1973 (age 52–53)
- Education: University of Rochester; Indian Institutes of Technology
- Scientific career
- Workplaces: Fred Hutchinson Cancer Research Center
- Thesis: Evolutionary strategies of retrotransposable elements (1999)
- Website: Malik Lab

Harmit Singh Malik (born 1973) is an Indian American evolutionary biologist who is a professor and associate director at the Fred Hutchinson Cancer Research Center. He was awarded the 2022 Genetics Society of America Edward Novitski Prize.

== Early life and education ==
Malik earned his bachelor's degree in chemical engineering at the Indian Institutes of Technology. He became interested in molecular biology after being taught by K. K. Rao and reading Richard Dawkins' The Selfish Gene. He moved to the University of Rochester for graduate studies, where he worked toward a doctorate in biology. His PhD research considered the evolutionary strategies of retrotransposable elements. In 1999, he moved to Seattle to join the Fred Hutchinson Cancer Research Center, where he worked under the supervision of Steven Henikoff.

== Research and career ==
Malik is interested in genetic conflict, the competition between genes and proteins with opposing function. This conflict drives evolutionary change. He is also interested in the evolutionary processes that determine how human bodies interact with viruses. For example, together with Lisa Kursel, Malik identified genes at the centre of conflict between cell types in Drosophila virilis. As these processes typically take place over very slow timescales, they are complicated and challenging to unravel. To understand the genetic conflicts that occur between different genomes – and different components of the same genomes – Malik turns to fossils. Viral fossils in animal genomes can be used to monitor intense episodes of gene adaption. Malik has expanded this research field, so-called paleovirology, developing the capabilities to describe the functional outcomes of molecular arms races.

Working with Steven Henikoff, Malik developed the concept of centromere-drive, a mechanism that explains the unusual genetic conflicts that arise during meiosis. Centromere-drive describes an evolutionary process in which centromeric repeats expand, which results in the recruitment of kinetochore proteins and segregation of the expanded centromere to the egg during female asymmetric meiosis.

As associate director at the Fred Hutchinson Cancer Research Center, Malik has worked on various initiatives to improve diversity, equity and inclusion. He was awarded the 2022 Genetics Society of America Edward Novitski Prize for his work on evolution and chromosome biology.

== Awards and honors ==
- 2008 Presidential Early Career Award for Scientists and Engineers
- 2009 Early Career Scientist of the Howard Hughes Medical Institute
- 2010 Vilcek Prize for Creative Promise in Biomedical Science
- 2011 Great Immigrants Recipient
- 2013 Full Investigator at the Howard Hughes Medical Institute
- 2017 Eli Lilly Prize in Microbiology
- 2019 Elected member of the National Academy of Sciences
- 2022 Genetics Society of America Edward Novitski Prize

== Selected publications ==
- David E Gordon; Gwendolyn M Jang; Mehdi Bouhaddou; et al. (30 April 2020). "A SARS-CoV-2 protein interaction map reveals targets for drug repurposing". Nature. 583 (7816): 459–468. doi:10.1038/s41586-020-2286-9. ISSN 1476-4687. PMC 7431030. PMID 32353859. Wikidata Q94470555.
- Henikoff S; Ahmad K; Harmit Singh Malik (1 August 2001). "The centromere paradox: stable inheritance with rapidly evolving DNA". Science. 293 (5532): 1098–1102. doi:10.1126/science.1062939. ISSN 0036-8075. PMID 11498581. Wikidata Q34332859.
- Harmit Singh Malik; Steven Henikoff (1 November 2003). "Phylogenomics of the nucleosome". Nature Structural Biology. 10 (11): 882–891. doi:10.1038/nsb996. ISSN 1072-8368. PMID 14583738. Wikidata Q35570334.
