= Melvin I. Simon =

American molecular biologist and geneticist

Melvin Isaac Simon (born February 8, 1937, in New York City) is an American molecular biologist, molecular geneticist, and microbiologist.

== Biography ==
After secondary education at Manhattan's Yeshiva University High School for Boys, he graduated in 1959 with a B.S. from City College of New York and in 1963 with a Ph.D. from Brandeis University. From 1963 to 1965 he was a postdoc at Princeton University. From 1965 to 1982 he was a faculty member of the biology department of the University of California, San Diego (UCSD). In 1982 he and UCSD professor John Abelson founded the Agouron Institute. In 1982 Simon and Abelson both moved to California Institute of Technology (Caltech). In the Division of Biology of Caltech, Simon was Biaggini Professor of Biological Sciences from 1982 to 2013, when he retired from Caltech as professor emeritus. At Caltech he was the chair of his department from 1995 to 2000. At the UC San Diego School of Medicine, was an adjunct professor of pharmacology from 2013 when he retired from UCSD.

Simon is the author or coauthor of over 350 scientific publications. Simon's group at UCSD did important research on bacterial movement and chemotaxis. Michael Robert Silverman (born in 1943) and Melvin Simon are credited with the discovery that bacterial flagella are based in rotary motors. Silverman was Simon's doctoral student.

Simon's laboratory group at Caltech played an important role in the Human Genome Project (HGP) and built many of the initial libraries that provided the basic material for the HGP. Simon's group invented in 1992 bacterial artificial chromosomes (BACs) and in 1994 phage artificial chromosomes (PACs) using the P1 phage. The group's scientists were among the main developers of the maps of human chromosome 16 and human chromosome 22. In 2002 Simon and colleagues determined the complete genome sequence of Pyrobaculum aerophilum, a hyperthermophilic archaeum. Simon and his Caltech group gained an international reputation for their research on G-proteins and the molecular mechanisms of how these proteins are essential for transmitting signals detected on cellular surfaces into cellular interiors. Simon and colleagues demonstrated how various genetic mutations in bacteria, nematodes, and mice cause various abnormalities and diseases.

Simon has been involved with a number of non-profit organizations and commercial corporations. He was one of the founders of Agouron Pharmaceuticals, Inc., which was acquired by Warner-Lambert in 1999. He was also one of the founders of the Diversa Corporation, which was merged with the Celunol Corporation in 2007 to form the Verenium Corporation. He was one of the founders for Agouron Institute and served as President from its founding in 1978 and became Chairman of the Board from 1987 through 2024. He was a co-editor of Methods in Enzymology from 1987 to 2010.

Simon was a Guggenheim fellow for the academic year 1978–1979. He was elected a member of the National Academy of Sciences in 1985 and a fellow of the American Academy of Arts and Sciences in 1986. In 1991 he received the Selman A. Waksman Award in Microbiology.

In June 1959 in the Bronx, he married Linda Fried. They have two sons and a daughter.

== Selected publications ==
=== Articles ===
- Hess J, Oosawa K, Kaplan N, Simon M (1988). "Phosphorylation of three proteins in the signaling pathway of bacterial chemotaxis". Cell. 53 (1): 79–87. doi:10.1016/0092-8674(88)90489-8. PMID 3280143. S2CID 24813653.
- Strathmann M, Simon MI (1990). "G protein diversity: A distinct class of alpha subunits is present in vertebrates and invertebrates". Proceedings of the National Academy of Sciences. 87 (23): 9113–9117. Bibcode:1990PNAS...87.9113S. doi:10.1073/pnas.87.23.9113. PMC 55114. PMID 2123549.
- Gautam N, Northup J, Tamir H, Simon MI (1990). "G protein diversity is increased by associations with a variety of gamma subunits". Proceedings of the National Academy of Sciences. 87 (20): 7973–7977. Bibcode:1990PNAS...87.7973G. doi:10.1073/pnas.87.20.7973. PMC 54874. PMID 2122451.
- Simon MI, Strathmann MP, Gautam N (1991). "Diversity of G Proteins in Signal Transduction". Science. 252 (5007): 802–808. Bibcode:1991Sci...252..802S. doi:10.1126/science.1902986. PMID 1902986. S2CID 19110329. (over 2700 citations)
- Swanson RV, Alex LA, Simon MI (1994). "Histidine and aspartate phosphorylation: Two-component systems and the limits of homology". Trends in Biochemical Sciences. 19 (11): 485–490. doi:10.1016/0968-0004(94)90135-X. PMID 7855892.
- Kim UJ, Birren BW, Slepak T, Mancino V, Boysen C, Kang HL, Simon MI, Shizuya H (1996). "Construction and Characterization of a Human Bacterial Artificial Chromosome Library". Genomics. 34 (2): 213–218. doi:10.1006/geno.1996.0268. PMID 8661051. 1996 (over 500 citations)
- Chen CK, Wieland T, Simon MI (1996). "RGS-r, a retinal specific RGS protein, binds an intermediate conformation of transducin and enhances recycling". Proceedings of the National Academy of Sciences. 93 (23): 12885–12889. Bibcode:1996PNAS...9312885C. doi:10.1073/pnas.93.23.12885. PMC 24015. PMID 8917514.
- Offermanns S, Toombs CF, Hu YH, Simon MI (1997). "Defective platelet activation in Gα_{q}-deficient mice". Nature. 389 (6647): 183–186. Bibcode:1997Natur.389..183O. doi:10.1038/38284. PMID 9296496. S2CID 4423109.
- Chen CK, Burns ME, Spencer M, Niemi GA, Chen J, Hurley JB, Baylor DA, Simon MI (1999). "Abnormal photoresponses and light-induced apoptosis in rods lacking rhodopsin kinase". Proceedings of the National Academy of Sciences. 96 (7): 3718–3722. Bibcode:1999PNAS...96.3718C. doi:10.1073/pnas.96.7.3718. PMC 22360. PMID 10097103.
- Yi TM, Huang Y, Simon MI, Doyle J (2000). "Robust perfect adaptation in bacterial chemotaxis through integral feedback control". Proceedings of the National Academy of Sciences. 97 (9): 4649–4653. Bibcode:2000PNAS...97.4649Y. doi:10.1073/pnas.97.9.4649. PMC 18287. PMID 10781070. 2000 (over 1100 citations)
- Chen CK, Burns ME, He W, Wensel TG, Baylor DA, Simon MI (2000). "Slowed recovery of rod photoresponse in mice lacking the GTPase accelerating protein RGS9-1". Nature. 403 (6769): 557–560. Bibcode:2000Natur.403..557C. doi:10.1038/35000601. PMID 10676965. S2CID 4430802.
- Han SK, Dong X, Hwang JI, Zylka MJ, Anderson DJ, Simon MI (2002). "Orphan G protein-coupled receptors MrgA1 and MrgC11 are distinctively activated by RF-amide-related peptides through the Gα_{q/11} pathway". Proceedings of the National Academy of Sciences. 99 (23): 14740–14745. Bibcode:2002PNAS...9914740H. doi:10.1073/pnas.192565799. PMC 137489. PMID 12397184.

=== Books ===
- Simon, Nelvin, Herskowitz, Ira, eds. (1985). Genome rearrangement: proceedings of the UCLA symposium held at Steamboat Springs, Colorado, April 7-13, 1984. New York: Liss. ISBN 0-8451-2619-9. LCCN 84029716.
- Simon, Melvin I., Crane, Brian R., Crane, Alexandrine, eds. (2007). Two-component signaling systems. San Diego, Calif.: Academic Press. LCCN 2008357338; 2 volumes, illustrated
  - ——, ——, ——, eds. (2007). Two-component signaling systems. Methods in Enzymology: Part A. Vol. 422. ISBN 978-0-12-373851-6.
  - ——, ——, ——, eds. (2007). Two-component signaling systems. Methods in Enzymology: Part B. Vol. 423. ISBN 978-0-12-373852-3.
