= Leonid Kruglyak =

American scientist

- Education: Princeton University; University of California at Berkeley
- Awards: Edward Novitski Prize (2016)
- Scientific career
- Fields: Genetics
- Workplaces: David Geffen School of Medicine; Fred Hutchinson Cancer Research Center; Whitehead Institute

Leonid Kruglyak is a scientist focusing on evolutionary genetics. He is the Chair of the Department of Human Genetics, a Distinguished Professor in the Departments of Human Genetics and Biological Chemistry and was appointed in 2020 The Diller-von Furstenberg Endowed Chair in Human Genetics at the David Geffen School of Medicine at the University of California Los Angeles.

Kruglyak received a bachelor's degree from Princeton University and a masters and doctorate from the University of California at Berkeley in physics. After working as faculty at the Whitehead Institute and Fred Hutchinson Cancer Research Center, he returned to Princeton as a professor of ecology and evolutionary biology in 2005. He has been an HHMI investigator since 2008.

He received an NIH MERIT award in 2002. He was elected a fellow of the American Association for the Advancement of Science in 2007. He received the Curt Stern Award in 2015 and the Edward Novitski Prize in 2016.

He married Hilary Coller in 1999, also a medical researcher at UCLA.
