= N. Louise Glass =

US academic microbial scientist

- Education: University of California, Davis, USA
- Scientific career
- Workplaces: University of California, Berkeley, USA
- Thesis: Cloning of the IAA-Lysine Synthetase Gene and Its Role in Regulating IAA Pool Size and Virulence of Pseudomonas syringae subsp. savastanoi (Conjugates, Olive Knot) (1986)

Nancy Louise Glass is the Fred E. Dickinson Chair of Wood Science and Technology at the University of California, Berkeley. She specialises in plant and microbial biology, particularly fungal cell biology and genetics

== Education ==
Glass gained her Ph.D. in plant pathology from the University of California, Davis in 1986.

== Career ==
Her career and research has been in fungal cell biology and genetics and how these can be applied to biofuels and biotechnology.

After graduation she worked with Robert Metzenberg on fungal genetics and molecular biology at the University of Wisconsin, Madison. In 1989 Glass was appointed as an assistant professor at the University of British Columbia Biotechnology Laboratory where she worked on genetic and molecular analyses of mating type, nonself recognition and programmed cell death in filamentous fungi. In 1999 she was recruited to the Plant and Microbial Biology Department at University of California, Berkeley, where she holds the UCB Fred E. Dickinson Chair of Wood Science and Technology.

Her research areas continue to include the sensing and response to carbon sources by fungi, which has applications in the production of biofuels through the use of fungi to degrade plant cell walls to bioethanol. She has also studied self-recognition in fungi, the way in which fungi can recognise self and non-self hyphae.

== Awards ==
In March 2019 she was awarded the Robert L. Metzenberg Award in Fungal Genetics by the Neurospora research community. In 2021 she was elected a member of the National Academy of Sciences.

Glass is a fellow of the American Association for the Advancement of Science from 2005, elected a fellow of the American Academy of Microbiology in 2010 and elected as a fellow of the Mycological Society of America in 2017.

In 2021, she was elected member of the U. S. National Academy of Sciences.

== Publications ==
Glass is the author or co-author of at least 150 scientific papers, book chapters and patents. These include:

- A. Pedro Gonçalves, Jens Heller, Asen Daskalov, Arnaldo Videira and N. Louise Glass (2017) Regulated forms of cell death in fungi. Frontiers in Microbiology 8 article number 1837
- Christian P. Kubicek, Trevor L Starr and N. Louise Glass (2014) Plant cell wall-degrading enzymes and their secretion in plant-pathogenic fungi.Annual Review of Phytopathology 52 427-451
- N. Louise Glass, Monika Schmoll, Jamie H. D. Cate and Samuel Coradetti (2013) Plant cell wall deconstruction by ascomycete fungi. Annual Review of Microbiology 67 477 - 498
- Samuel T. Coradetti, James P. Craig, Yi Xiong, Teresa Shock, Chaoguang Tian and N. Louise Glass (2012) Conserved and essential transcription factors for cellulase gene expression in ascomycete fungi. Proceedings of the National Academy of Sciences, USA 109 7397 - 7402
- Suk-Jin Haa, Jonathan M. Galazkac, Soo Rin Kim, Jin-Ho Choi, Xiaomin Yang, Jin-Ho Seo, N. Louise Glass, Jamie H. D. Cate and Yong-Su Jin (2011) Engineered Saccharomyces cerevisiae capable of simultaneous cellobiose and xylose fermentation. Proceedings of the National Academy of Sciences, USA 108 504 - 509
- N. Louise Glass and 12 others (2010) Methods and compositions for improving sugar transport, mixed sugar fermentation, and production of biofuels. US Patent number US8431360B2
- Jay C. Dunlap, Katherine A. Borkovich and 34 other authors including N. Louise Glass (2007) Enabling a community to cissect an organism: Overview of the Neurospora Functional Genomics Project. Fungal Genomics 57 49 - 96
