= Genetic interaction network =

Genetic interaction networks represent the functional interactions between pairs of genes in an organism and are useful for understanding the relation between genotype and phenotype. The majority of genes do not code for particular phenotypes. Instead, phenotypes often result from the interaction between several genes. In humans, "Each individual carries ~4 million genetic variants and polymorphisms, the overwhelming majority of which cannot be pinpointed as the single cause for a given phenotype. Instead, the effects of genetic variants may combine with one another both additively and synergistically, and each variant's contribution to a quantitative trait or disease risk could depend on the genotypes of dozens of other variants. Interactions between genetic variants, along with the environmental conditions, are likely to play a major role in determining the phenotype that arises from a given genotype." Genetic interaction networks help to understand genetic interactions by identifying such interactions between pairs of genes.

Because genetic interactions provide insight into how genotype connects to phenotype in an organism, improved knowledge of genetic interactions in humans could provide crucial insight into complex diseases. Unfortunately, due to the impossibility of isolating subjects with single genetic variants, it is not possible to directly map the genetic interaction networks in humans. Researchers hope that learning about the characteristics of genetic interaction networks in suitable organisms will provide tools for constructing the genetic interaction network of humans.

== Overview ==
A genetic interaction occurs when the interactions between two or more genes results in a phenotype that differs from the phenotype expected if the genes were independent of each other. In the context of genetic interaction networks, a genetic interaction is defined as "the difference between an experimentally measured double-mutant phenotype and an expected double-mutant phenotype, the latter of which is predicted from the combination of the single-mutant effects, assuming the mutations act independently." In this context, a commonly studied phenotype is fitness which measures the relative reproduction rate of a mutant. A strong phenotype refers to a low level of fitness while a weak phenotype refers to a level of fitness close to that of the non-mutant strain.

A negative genetic interaction occurs when the phenotype of the double mutant is stronger than expected. A special case is a synthetic lethal interaction which occurs when the removal of individual genes does not significantly harm an organism but the removal of both genes results in an inviable organism. A positive genetic interaction occurs when the phenotype of the double mutant is weaker than expected. A special case is genetic suppression which occurs when the phenotype of the double mutant is weaker than that of the least-fit single mutant.

In order to measure the interaction between two genes, one must have some standard for the expected phenotype if the genes do not interact. Some common models for how the phenotypes of independent genes combine include the min, additive, and multiplicative models. In the min model, the expected fitness resulting from the mutation of two independent genes is the same as the fitness of the least-fit single mutant. In the additive model, the expected phenotype resulting from the mutation of two independent genes is the sum of the phenotypes due to the individual mutations. In the multiplicative model, the expected phenotype resulting from the mutation of two independent genes is the product of the phenotypes due to the individual mutations. Which model is best depends on the situation. It turns out in the case that fitness is used as the phenotype, the multiplicative model is best option.

Methods exist to measure genetic interactions even when one of the genes is essential to an organism.

== Properties of genetic interaction networks ==
Genetic interaction networks have been studied extensively in several organisms including Saccharomyces cerevisiae, Schizosaccharomyces pombe, Escherichia coli, Caenorhabditis elegans, and Drosophila melanogaster. These studies have given insight into properties of genetic interaction networks, including the topology of genetic interaction networks, how genetic interaction networks provide information about gene function, and what characteristics of genetic interaction networks are conserved by evolution. Researchers hope that an understanding of the general properties of genetic interaction networks as well as how they relate to other biological information such as protein-protein interaction networks will make it possible to infer the genetic interaction networks in organisms such as humans for which it is not possible to determine genetic interaction networks directly.

The hubs of genetic interaction networks tend to be essential proteins.

When two genes interact with a similar set of neighbors, this, along with the particular nature of those interactions, provides information about how the functions of the two genes are related. For example, genes that share a common set of synthetic lethal interactions tend to be involved in the same biological pathway. The set of genes with which a gene interacts and the type of those interactions (i.e. synthetic lethal) make up that gene's interaction profile. This information allows the creation of a genetic profile similarity network from a genetic interaction network. In a genetic profile similarity network, edges connect genes with similar interaction profiles. The result is a network consisting of clusters of genes that tend to be involved in the same biological process and where the connections between these clusters provide information about the interdependencies of these biological processes. This can provide a powerful tool for predicting the function of uncharacterized genes.

Some studies have looked into how genetic networks are conserved across evolutionary distance. While it is not clear the degree to which individual gene-gene interactions are conserved, the general properties of genetic interaction networks appear to be conserved such as the network hubs and the ability of genetic interaction profiles to predict biological function.

== Biological implications ==
Genetic interactions have important implications for the connection between genotype and phenotype. For example, they have been proposed as an explanation for missing heritability. Missing heritability refers to the fact that the genetic sources of many heritable phenotypes are yet to be discovered. While a variety of explanations have been proposed, genetic interactions could majorly decrease the amount of missing heritability by increasing the explanatory power of known genetic sources. Such genetic interactions would most likely go beyond the pairwise interactions considered in genetic interaction networks.
