= NtrC =

Name of the protein necessary for prokaryotic regulation

NtrC (Nitrogen regulatory protein C) is the name of the protein necessary for the prokaryotic regulation transcription factor sigma N (sigma 54) to form an open complex with RNA polymerase in order to activate glnA transcription. The closed -> open conformational change of the sigma N-RNA polymerase complex around the glutamine synthetase gene promoter requires ATP and involves the formation of a loop between the enhancer and the promoter regions, which may be facilitated by DNA-bending proteins (such as IHF). The NtrC proteins bind at two sites located -160 and -80 upstream from the point of gene transcription.
