= Boris Magasanik =

- Born: December 19, 1919; Kharkiv, Ukrainian SSR, Russian SFSR (now in Ukraine)
- Died: December 25, 2013 (aged 94); Cambridge, Massachusetts
- Education: Columbia University
- Awards: Selman A. Waksman Award in Microbiology (1993)
- Scientific career
- Fields: Microbiology, biochemistry, molecular biology
- Workplaces: Harvard Medical School, MIT
- Doctoral advisor: Erwin Chargaff

Boris Magasanik (December 19, 1919 – December 25, 2013) was a microbiologist and biochemist who was the Jacques Monod Professor Emeritus of Microbiology in the Department of Biology at the Massachusetts Institute of Technology. After moving from Harvard Medical School in 1960, Magasanik spent the rest of his research career at MIT, including an influential decade as the head of the Department of Biology from 1967–77. Magasanik's research interests focused on gene regulation, including study of nitrogen metabolic regulation in bacteria, catabolite repression, and intracellular signaling via two-component systems. Magasanik retired in 1990 and died in 2013.

== Early life and education ==
Magasanik was born in Kharkiv, Ukraine on December 19, 1919, to a family he later described as "belonging to the capitalist class" and who left for Vienna after Kharkiv was captured by Communist forces during the then-ongoing Ukrainian civil war. Raised in Vienna, Magasanik began his university education studying chemistry in 1937, but was unable to continue due to the Anschluss in 1938, in which Jews were expelled from Austrian universities. He then emigrated to New York City, where his sister, a singer known as Zina Alvers, and her husband David Adlersberg, a medical researcher, had moved a year prior, and there completed his studies at the City College of New York, from which he graduated in 1941.

Magasanik began graduate education at Pennsylvania State University, but was interrupted by the United States' entry into World War II. As Magasanik later recalled, other recent chemistry graduates of the period were able to find jobs in the defense industry, but as he was not yet eligible for American citizenship, he was instead drafted into the army and ultimately spent four years serving as a medical technician.

After leaving the army Magasanik returned to Ph.D. studies, this time at Columbia University under the direction of Erwin Chargaff. Magasanik received his Ph.D. in 1948. Asked years later to write a brief autobiography about his life in science, Magasanik described his early life as "almost entirely determined by the political events of the period between the two world wars and by World War II."

== Academic career ==
Magasanik was recruited to a position at Harvard Medical School by J. Howard Mueller and began his faculty career there in 1949, advancing to a tenured position in the Department of Bacteriology and Immunology in 1958. During this period he spent a sabbatical at the Pasteur Institute with Jacques Monod thanks to a Guggenheim Fellowship. In 1960, Magasanik was recruited from Harvard to MIT by noted microbiologist Salvador Luria, who sought to raise the MIT Department of Biology's profile in molecular biology.

In 1967, Magasanik became the head of the Department of Biology, a position in which he served until 1977. His leadership during this period, especially in decision-making about new faculty hires, has been widely cited as contributing to the success of the department in the molecular biology field.

Magasanik became the Jacques Monod Professor of Biology in 1977. After being succeeded by Gene Brown as department head, Magasanik concentrated on research and teaching rather than administrative work until his retirement in 1990, when he became professor emeritus.

In 1969, Magasanik became a member of the United States National Academy of Sciences, from which he received the Selman A. Waksman Award in Microbiology in 1993.

== Teaching ==
Magasanik was known as a skilled and committed educator of undergraduates, and in fact cited the opportunity to teach undergraduate courses as one reason for his move from Harvard Medical School to MIT. During his career at MIT he was engaged in redevelopment of the undergraduate biology curriculum and continued to teach undergraduate courses for several years after his retirement.

== Personal life ==
Magasanik met his first wife, Adele Karp, when both were graduate students at Columbia; they were married in 1949. Karp was also a researcher at Harvard and later worked with Magasanik at MIT, though she retired from science in the early 1960s to care for her elderly mother. The couple became avid art collectors, with particular interest in African art, and also enjoyed opera and extensive travel. Karp died of lung cancer in 1991. Magasanik married Helen Donis-Keller, a scientist and artist, in 1996. On December 25, 2013, Magasanik died in Cambridge, Massachusetts at age 94.
