= Charles Boone (scientist) =

Canadian scientist

- Occupation: Professor
- Known for: Molecular genetics

Charles Boone is a Canadian molecular geneticist and researcher who is currently Professor at the University of Toronto. His research is focused on mapping the genetic interactions of all yeast genes where he has pioneered an automated form of yeast genetics, synthetic genetic array (SGA) analysis.

He has been appointed to the National Academy of Sciences as an International Member. In 2014, he was the recipient of the Genetics Society of America (GSA) Edward Novitski Prize, for creativity in genetics.
