= John Roth (geneticist) =

American geneticist

John Roger Roth
- Born: March 14, 1939 (age 87); Winona, Minnesota
- Education: Harvard University (BA); Johns Hopkins University (PhD); Umeå University (PhD Honoris Causa)
- Occupation: Distinguished Professor of Biology
- Spouse: Shery G. Roth
- Awards: Genetics Society of America Thomas Hunt Morgan Medal (2009); American Society for Microbiology Lifetime Achievement Award (2015)
- Scientific career
- Fields: DNA rearrangements Bacterial genetics evolution
- Workplaces: University of California, Berkeley; University of Utah; University of California, Davis
- Doctoral advisor: Phil Hartman

John Roger Roth (born 14 March 1939) is an American geneticist, bacterial physiologist, and evolutionist. He is a Distinguished Professor of Biological Sciences at the University of California, Davis.

He became well known for his early studies on the structure and regulation of the his operon of Salmonella, and went on to investigate regulation in systems as diverse as suppression by tRNA, NAD biosynthesis, and the Vitamin B12-dependent metabolism of small molecules such as ethanolamine and propanediol. In collaboration with David Botstein and Nancy Kleckner, he developed the use of transposons as genetic tools. As a by-product of his study of transposons, he developed an interest in chromosomal duplications, which are frequent in bacteria. He has recently authored several papers on the involvement of such small-effect mutations on evolution under selection.

As instructors of the summer Advanced Bacterial Genetics course at Cold Spring Harbor Laboratory, John Roth, David Botstein, and Ron Davis taught many scientists how to use transposons and other modern molecular genetic tools for analysis of bacteria.

In 1988, he became a member of the National Academy of Sciences. In 2009, he was awarded the Thomas Hunt Morgan Medal of the Genetics Society of America, and in 2015, the American Society for Microbiology Lifetime Achievement Award. In 2011, ASM Press published a festschrift in his honor ("The Lure of Bacterial Genetics: A Tribute to John Roth").
