= Edward B. Lewis =

American biologist (1918-2004)

Edward Lewis ForMemRS
- Born: Edward Butts Lewis; May 20, 1918; Wilkes-Barre, Pennsylvania, US
- Died: July 21, 2004 (aged 86); Pasadena, California, US
- Education: University of Minnesota (B.A., 1939); California Institute of Technology (PhD, 1942, M.S., 1943)
- Known for: Research into genetics of the common fruit fly
- Awards: Thomas Hunt Morgan Medal (1983); Wolf Prize in Medicine (1989); Louisa Gross Horwitz Prize (1992); Albert Lasker Award for Basic Medical Research (1991); Nobel Prize in Medicine (1995)
- Scientific career
- Fields: Genetics; Developmental biology; Embryology
- Thesis: A genetic and cytological analysis of a tandem duplication and its included loci in Drosophila melanogaster (1942)
- Doctoral advisor: Alfred Sturtevant
- Doctoral students: Mark M. Davis

Edward Butts Lewis (May 20, 1918 – July 21, 2004) was an American geneticist, a corecipient of the 1995 Nobel Prize in Physiology or Medicine. He helped to found the field of evolutionary developmental biology.

== Early life ==
Lewis was born in Wilkes-Barre, Pennsylvania, the second son of Laura Mary Lewis (née Histed) and Edward Butts Lewis, a watchmaker-jeweler. His full name was supposed to be Edward Butts Lewis Jr., but his birth certificate was incorrectly filled out with "B." as his middle name.

Lewis graduated from E. L. Meyers High School.

== Education and career ==
He received a BA in Biostatistics from the University of Minnesota in 1939, where he worked on Drosophila melanogaster in the lab of C.P. Oliver. In 1942 Lewis received a PhD from California Institute of Technology (Caltech), working under the guidance of Alfred Sturtevant. In 1939, Edward B. Lewis arrived at Caltech and finished his PhD within three years. Lewis enrolled in the U.S. Army Air Corps training program in meteorology in 1942 and later received his master's degree in the area a year later. As he left for military service in 1943, he was told by the university president Robert A. Millikan that he had a position as an instructor at Caltech when he returned. He served working mostly as a weather forecaster in Hawaii and Okinawa for four years. Lewis returned in 1946 and took his position at Caltech where his duties included helping in the laboratory for an introductory genetics course. He was promoted in 1956 to a professor and became the Thomas Hunt Morgan Professor of Biology in 1966.

== Personal life ==
In 1946, Edward B. Lewis met Pamela Harrah (1925–2018). She was an accomplished artist, but also shared Lewis' interests in animal life. She had gone to Stanford and studied genetics and later discovered the mutant Polycomb, that now is important in the understanding of gene regulation. They married and had three sons named Glenn, Hugh, and Keith. Pam developed an infection that caused her to have a visual and physical, partial unilateral paralysis, which limited her mobility.

Lewis maintained a constant exercise routine in his day, as he started his mornings with breakfast and exercise, until he suffered from cancer. Lewis would normally have lunch with his faculty members at the Anthenaeum, then take a nap and return to the laboratory in the evening. The most constant part of his daily routine was that he would do most of his work at night. He also enjoyed playing the flute and would allow himself to have time to play the flute at night. In addition, Lewis appreciated other aspects of life even though they interrupted his typical schedule. Some other things he did with his time include: jogging, swimming, playing on the beach, playing chamber music with friends, going to see movies, and attending opera performances. Edward B. Lewis was a humble man who did not always receive attention for his works. Over time, his work with Drosophila became more appreciated and he began to attract more attention.

== Career and research ==
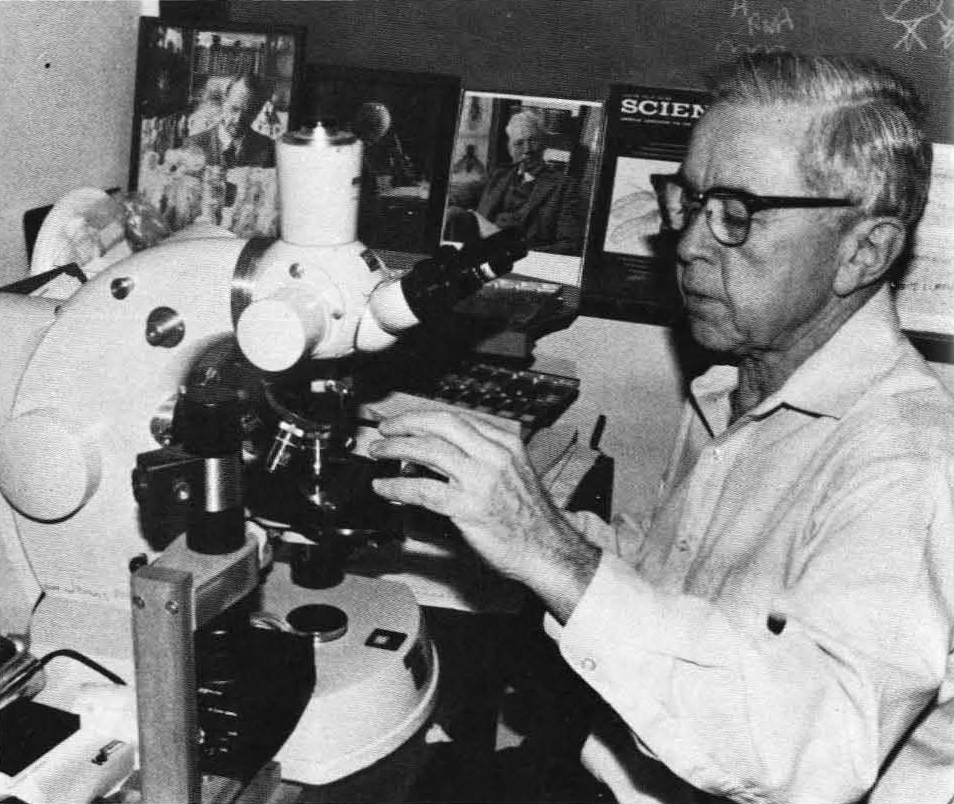
Lewis in 1986

His Nobel Prize–winning studies with Drosophila, including the discovery of the Drosophila Bithorax complex of homeotic genes and the elucidation of its function, helped found the field of evolutionary developmental biology and laid the groundwork for modern understanding of conserved mechanisms of animal development. He is credited with development of the complementation test. A collection of his key publications and perspectives is presented in the edited volume Genes, Development and Cancer: The Life and Work of Edward B. Lewis.

In the 1940s and 1950s, Lewis carried out foundational studies on closely linked mutations in Drosophila, introducing the concept of pseudoallelism. Through analysis of loci such as white and apricot, he demonstrated that mutations previously thought to represent multiple alleles of a single gene could in fact be separated by recombination, revealing that genes could consist of multiple closely linked functional elements. These studies helped establish the concept of intragenic recombination and challenged the classical view of genes as indivisible units, laying the groundwork for his later work on gene complexes such as the Bithorax complex.

During the 1950s, Lewis studied the effects of radiation from X-rays, nuclear fallout and other sources as possible causes of cancer. He reviewed medical records from survivors of the atomic bombings of Hiroshima and Nagasaki, as well as radiologists and patients exposed to X-rays. Lewis concluded that "health risks from radiation had been underestimated". Lewis published articles in Science and other journals and made a presentation to a Congressional committee on atomic energy in 1957.

At the scientific level of the debate, the crucial question was whether the "threshold theory" was valid or whether, as Lewis insisted, the effects of radioactivity were "linear with no threshold", where every exposure to radiation had a long-term cumulative effect.

The issue of linearity versus threshold re-entered the debate on nuclear fallout in 1962, when Ernest Sternglass, a Pittsburgh physicist, argued that the linearity thesis was confirmed by the research of Alice Stewart. (See also John Gofman )

On November 20, 2001, Lewis was interviewed by Elliot Meyerowitz in the Kerckhoff Library at the California Institute of Technology, Pasadena, California. This interview was released on DVD in 2004 as "Conversations in Genetics: Volume 1, No. 3 – Edward B. Lewis; An Oral History of Our Intellectual Heritage in Genetics" 67 min; Producer Rochelle Easton Esposito; The Genetics Society of America.

== Awards and honors ==
- Member of the National Academy of Sciences (1968)
- Honorary doctorate, University of Umeå, Sweden (1981)
- Thomas Hunt Morgan Medal (1983)
- Gairdner Foundation International award (1987)
- Wolf Foundation prize in medicine (1989)
- Rosenstiel award (1990)
- National Medal of Science (1990)
- Albert Lasker Basic Medical Research Award (1991)
- Louisa Gross Horwitz prize (Columbia University) (1992)
- Honorary doctorate, University of Minnesota (1993)
- Nobel Prize in Physiology or Medicine (1995) (with Christiane Nüsslein-Volhard and Eric Wieschaus)
