= Harrison Echols =

American molecular biologist, biochemist and geneticist

Harrison "Hatch" Echols
- Born: Gessner Harrison Echols Jr. May 1, 1933; Charlottesville, Virginia
- Died: April 11, 1993 (aged 59); Berkeley, California
- Education: University of Virginia (BA 1955); University of Wisconsin, Madison (MA 1957, PhD 1959)
- Known for: identifying the genetic make-up and functions of bacteriophage lambda
- Spouse: Carol Gross
- Awards: Member of the National Academy of Sciences (1991); Guggenheim Fellow (1981)
- Scientific career
- Fields: biochemistry, molecular biology, genetics
- Workplaces: University of Wisconsin, Madison; University of California, Berkeley
- Thesis: An X-ray Scattering Study of Protein Denaturation (1959)
- Academic advisors: John William Anderegg; Cyrus Levinthal
- Doctoral students: Sankar Adhya

Gessner Harrison "Hatch" Echols Jr. (May 1, 1933 – April 11, 1993) was an American molecular biologist, biochemist, and geneticist, whose work on the lambda phage advanced the understanding of viral infections and gene regulation inside the cell.

== Early life and education ==
Harrison Echols was born in Charlottesville, Virginia in 1933, and attended the Episcopal High School in Alexandria, Virginia. He graduated in 1955 from the University of Virginia, where his grandfather William Holding Echols had been an influential professor of mathematics. He had initially intended to become a writer but ultimately completed his BA, MA, and PhD in physics.

He earned his PhD in 1959 from the University of Wisconsin, Madison, where he would subsequently return as a professor the following year.

== Research and career ==
In 1959, Echols was first introduced to genetics as a postdoctoral student at Cyrus Levinthal's lab at MIT, where he uncovered the mechanism of regulation of the bacterial enzyme alkaline phosphatase. In contrast to Francois Jacob and Jacques Monod's 1960 operon theory that prescribed a single repressor model for regulation, Echols discovered that there were two separate genes acting on the enzyme: one positively (to promote) and one negatively (to repress).

After completing his postdoctoral work, he returned to the University of Wisconsin, Madison as professor of biochemistry, where he taught from 1960 to 1969. He spent the remainder of his life as a professor of molecular biology at the University of California, Berkeley, from 1969 to 1993, chairing the department of molecular biology from 1978 to 1980.

Echols was an early pioneer in scientific ethics, teaching courses on the subject long before it was common practice. In 1970 at a Phage Group meeting, he laid out a proposal for a more collaborative approach to science, wherein each paper in a given field would be coauthored by all scientists working in that field, so that scientific publications would better reflect the communal nature of science.

=== Areas of study ===
At the University of Wisconsin, Echols began to study the lambda phage – in particular, the regulatory processes that determined when the phage would follow the lytic cycle or lysogenic cycle based on its conditions, continuing the work on gene regulation that he had begun with his study of alkaline phosphatase at MIT.

Echols also performed pioneering work in determining how phage DNA moves in and out of a host cell's DNA during infection. According to Randy Schekman, "these studies were influential in suggesting how certain human tumor viruses may combine with a cell's chromosome."

Later in his career, Echols became interested in factors controlling fidelity of DNA replication and the SOS response caused by DNA damage. He spent a sabbatical year in 1981–1982 in Arthur Kornberg's group at Stanford University, where he gained experience with the then-novel approaches of enzymology and electron microscopy. Using his broad palette of techniques, he wrote a number of papers of "virtuosic science" starting in 1982 studying DNA polymerase III and SOS mutagenesis.

=== Honors ===
In 1981, Echols was awarded the Guggenheim Fellowship. In 1991, he was elected a Member of the National Academy of Sciences.

== Personal life ==
Echols was married four times, and at the time of his death was married to cell biologist Carol Gross. He had four children with his first wife, Jean Crutchfield (m. 1954): Cathy, Elizabeth, Jean, and Robert.

Echols was an accomplished tennis player. He played tennis at University of Virginia and won multiple trophies at a Madison, Wisconsin tournament in 1961. Mark Ptashne recounts a tennis match against Echols:

"Hatch presented himself as the archetypal Californian: tie-dyed shirt, hair in a ponytail, hesitant of speech—in short, way laid-back. At a Gordon Conference, I fell for this ruse and found myself on a tennis court with him. Hatch's demeanor didn't change much, but the balls came over the net with lethal speed and precision. It was something like being a civilian taking a stroll through Jurassic Park. I took up golf." – Mark Ptashne

The Hatch Echols Memorial Tennis Tournament is held in his honor every year at the Molecular Genetics of Bacteria and Phages Meeting at the University of Wisconsin, Madison.

Echols died of lung cancer on April 11, 1993, in Berkeley, California.

== Selected works ==
- Operators and Promoters: The Story of Molecular Biology and Its Creators (written 1986–1992, published 2001), a narrative history of molecular biology, edited by Carol Gross after Echols's death and published posthumously
