= Bithorax complex =

Homeobox gene expression in Drosophila melanogaster

The Bithorax complex (BX-C) is one of two Drosophila melanogaster homeotic gene complexes, located on the right arm of chromosome 3. It is responsible for the differentiation of the posterior two-thirds (posterior thorax and each abdominal segment) of the fly by the regulation of three genes within the complex: Ultrabithorax (Ubx), abdominal A (abd-A), and Abdominal B (Abd-B).

A complete deletion of this complex results in the posterior segments of the Drosophila embryo becoming copies of the second thoracic segment.

== History ==
The first homeotic mutation to be isolated was the bithorax (bx) mutant in 1915 by Calvin Bridges, which was later worked on and better characterized as a gene cluster by Edward B. Lewis. Lewis found that BX-C contained genes that code for proteins controlling the levels of thoracic and abdominal development, and postulated that at least four of these genes were regulated by cis-regulatory elements, as well as a separate locus (Polycomb) that acted as a repressor. However, subsequent research has found that the complex only contains three genes that are differentially expressed in each parasegment. Lewis’ work on BX-C earned him the Nobel Prize in Physiology or Medicine in 1995.

== Gene information ==
The gene complex is located on the right arm of chromosome 3 alongside the other homeotic gene complex, the Antennapedia (Antp) complex. It is over 300 kb long and contains nine distinct cis-regulatory domains. The three transcription units, Ubx, abd-A, and Abd-B, are spread out evenly on the complex. A mutant embryo with a triple knock-out of Ubx, abd-A, and Abd-B has a phenotype that is identical to that of an embryo with a complete BX-C deletion, suggesting that the three transcription units are the only functional protein-coding units in the complex. This was confirmed when the entire complex was eventually sequenced in 1995. Only about 1.4% of the BX-C sequence codes for proteins.

Deletion of the entire complex results in death of the embryo late in development. It also shows changes in the segmentation of the embryonic cuticle, with all abdominal segments and the third thoracic segment resembling the second thoracic segment. Individual mutations within the complex also result in segmental changes, though not as dramatic as the entire deletion of the complex.

== Patterning ==
BX-C controls the differential patterning of the posterior thoracic segment (T3) and all 8 of the abdominal segments (A1-A8) of Drosophila. During embryonic development, regulation of BX-C expression occurs on the level of units called parasegments. The parasegments are slightly misaligned with the anatomical segments, each comprising the posterior part of one segment and the anterior part of the adjacent segment.

The parasegment-specific expression patterns of the BX-C genes are controlled by large and complex cis-regulatory regions. 9 functionally distinct cis-regulatory sub-domains have been identified: abx/bx, bxd/pbx, iab-2, iab-3, iab-4, iab-5, iab-6, iab-7, and iab-8,9. They are arranged along the chromosome in the same order as the parasegments that they act in. Loss-of-function mutations of one sub-domain will result in a target parasegment becoming a copy of the parasegment that is immediately anterior to it.
