= James Haber =

American molecular biologist

- Born: James E. Haber; 1943; Pittsburgh, Pennsylvania
- Education: Harvard University, AB; University of California, Berkeley, Ph.D. 1970
- Known for: DNA repair mechanisms
- Awards: Thomas Hunt Morgan Medal of the Genetics Society of America
- Scientific career
- Fields: Biochemistry, Genetics
- Workplaces: University of Wisconsin, Brandeis University
- Academic advisors: Daniel E. Koshland, Jr.

James E. Haber is an American molecular biologist known for discoveries in the field of DNA repair, in particular for his contributions to understanding the mechanisms of non-homologous end joining and microhomology-mediated end joining, as well as homologous recombination.

== Early life ==
Haber was born in Pittsburgh, Pennsylvania in 1943.

== Education ==
Haber obtained his AB at Harvard University, and his Ph.D. at the University of California, Berkeley, under the supervision of Daniel E. Koshland, Jr., working at that time on subunit interactions in proteins such as hemoglobin, as well as more general aspects of protein structure. After obtaining his doctorate he moved to the Laboratory of Molecular Biology, University of Wisconsin, Madison, Wisconsin for post-doctoral work in the group of Harlyn Halvorson, when he studied the cell cycle dependence of sporulation in yeast.

== Career at Brandeis University ==
After his postdoctoral research Haber moved to Brandeis University, where he became the Abraham and Etta Goodman Professor of Biology, and Director of the Rosenstiel Basic Medical Sciences Research Center, and where he has spent his career. There he studied various aspects of DNA repair, including mechanisms of non-homologous end-joining in yeast. He has also worked on histone chaperones and the regulation of histone traffic.

== Distinctions ==
Haber was elected to the National Academy of Sciences in 2010. In 2011 he received the Thomas Hunt Morgan Medal of the Genetics Society of America. He is a Fellow of the American Association for the Advancement of Science, the American Academy of Microbiology and the American Academy of Arts and Sciences.
