= Victor Corces =

Geneticist

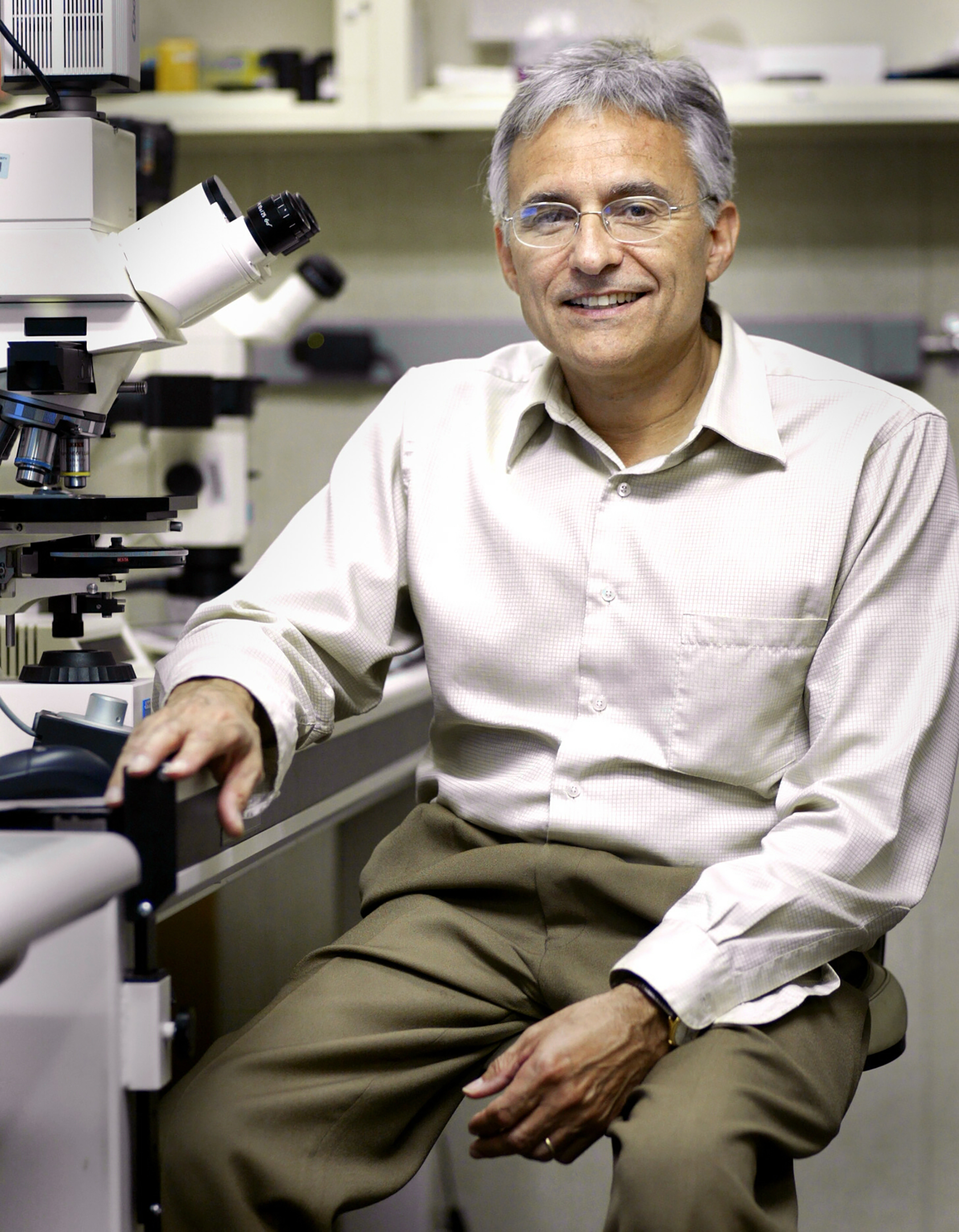

Victor Corces (born August 16, 1952, in Asturias, Spain) is a Professor of Human Genetics at Emory University. His work has focused on understanding the mechanisms by which chromosomes are folded in the three-dimensional nuclear space. He was elected to the National Academy of Sciences for pioneering work in epigenetics, genomics, and computational biology. He is also a member of the Spanish Royal Academy of Sciences.

== Education ==
Corces obtained a BS in Chemistry at the Universidad Complutense in Madrid, Spain in 1975. He obtained a PhD in Chemistry at the Universidad Autónoma de Madrid in 1978. He carried out postdoctoral work in the laboratory of Mathew Meselson in the Department of Biochemistry and Molecular Biology at Harvard University.

== Research and career ==
Corces was Assistant, Associate and Full Professor in the Department of Biology at the Johns Hopkins University between 1982 and 2007. He was the Chair of the Biology Department from 1998 to 2003. He is responsible for the identification of the first type of a DNA sequence called insulator element and the identification and characterization of proteins that bind to this sequence in Drosophila. Using cellular and molecular approaches, he found that insulator sequences and their associated proteins form loops in the cell nucleus. Based on these results, he proposed that the role of insulator sequences is to organize the three-dimensional architecture of the DNA in the nucleus.

Corces moved to Emory University in 2007, where he is currently the William P. Timmie Professor of Human Genetics in the School of Medicine. While at Emory, Corces used chromosome conformation capture to describe the subdivision of chromosomes into self-associating domains, and he used the heat shock response as a paradigm to study the relationship between 3D organization and gene expression. He also contributed to the development of new computational tools, including tools to analyze 5C and Hi-C data and to map CTCF loops. He used mouse models and differentiation of human embryonic stem cells to approach questions on the functional role of chromatin 3D organization, including the role of CTCF and cohesin during the differentiation of embryonic stem cells into neurons and pancreatic cells. He also showed that DNA hemimethylation is inherited through cell division and serves to regulate CTCF and cohesin function in ESCs. Work from his lab suggests that sperm chromatin may not be as inert as previously thought, and that RNAPII, CTCF, and transcription factors remain bound to the sperm genome creating a 3D configuration very similar to that found in embryonic stem cells. This has led us to the idea that environmental insults may affect the distribution of transcription factors in the germ line, and that these alterations may be transmitted to the progeny causing defects in cell differentiation leading to disease states. His lab has studied the effects of BPA on chromatin structure and organization in the gametes and their effect in the development of obesity. Based on results from this work, his lab found that exposure to BPA results in epigenetic modifications in the Fto gene at enhancers found to be affected by sequence variants in humans.
