= Pseudoalleles =

Pseudoallelism refers to a genetic phenomenon in which two or more functionally related loci are so closely linked on a chromosome that they were historically interpreted as alleles of a single gene.

Pseudoalleles typically affect the same phenotype and may fail to complement in some genetic tests, leading early geneticists to classify them as multiple alleles of one gene. However, recombination between such rare loci demonstrates that they are distinct genetic units.

The concept was developed in the mid-twentieth century through studies of closely linked mutations in Drosophila. Notably, Edward B. Lewis introduced the term "pseudoalleles" to describe loci that behaved as alleles genetically but could be separated by crossing over, demonstrating that what had been considered a single gene could consist of multiple closely linked functional elements.

Lewis’s work on loci such as Star and asteroid in Drosophila showed that recombination could occur within what had been assumed to be a single gene, leading to the concept of intragenic recombination and refining the classical gene concept. Similarly, Lewis demonstrated pseudoallelism at the white locus in Drosophila, showing that recombination could occur between closely linked functional units previously thought to be alleles.

In his analysis of the bithorax complex in Drosophila, Lewis described a cluster of closely linked, functionally related loci behaving as pseudoalleles, which together control segmental identity during development.

Pseudoallelism was historically important because it challenged the early view, associated with Thomas Hunt Morgan, that genes were discrete, indivisible units. Instead, it suggested that genes could be structurally complex and that genome organization might influence gene function.

Characteristics of pseudoalleles include:

- Extremely close genetic linkage, with rare recombination between loci
- Effects on the same phenotype or biological function
- Apparent allelism in complementation tests despite being distinct genetic loci

== Modern interpretation ==
With the advent of molecular genetics, most classical cases of pseudoallelism are now understood as tightly linked but distinct genes, often arising through gene duplication. These genes may retain related or partially redundant functions and can form part of larger gene clusters, such as the Hox gene complexes.

As a result, the term pseudoallelism is now largely of historical interest, reflecting an intermediate stage in the development of the modern gene concept rather than a distinct molecular mechanism.

== Examples ==
- The white and apricot loci in Drosophila
- The Star and asteroid loci described by Lewis
- Gene clusters such as the Hox gene complexes were historically interpreted as systems of pseudoalleles.

== See also ==
- Gene duplication
- Complementation (genetics)
