= Shirleen Roeder =

American geneticist

G. Shirleen Roeder
- Education: University of Toronto
- Scientific career
- Thesis: Recombination, maturation and packaging of the bacteriophage T7 chromosome (1978)

Glenna Shirleen Roeder is a geneticist known for identifying and characterizing the yeast genes that regulate the process of meiosis with particular emphasis on synapsis.

== Education and career ==
Roeder has a B.Sc. from Dalhousie University (1973) and earned her Ph.D. in 1978 from the University of Toronto. Following her Ph.D. she was a postdoctoral fellow at Cornell University before moving to the faculty at Yale University in 1981. In 2001 she was named the Eugene Higgins Professor of Genetics in the Molecular, Cellular, and Developmental Biology Department at Yale University. Roeder retired in 2012 and, as of 2021, she is Professor Emeritus at Yale University.

== Research ==
Roeder used budding yeast as a model system to examine meiosis. She discovered the Zip1 protein, and discovered two distinct processes that regulate the recombination between chromosomes in meiosis and also a process inhibiting recombination.

== Selected publications ==
- Roeder, G. Shirleen (15 October 1997). "Meiotic chromosomes: it takes two to tango". Genes & Development. 11 (20): 2600–2621. doi:10.1101/gad.11.20.2600. ISSN 0890-9369. PMID 9334324.
- Sym, Mary; Engebrecht, JoAnne; Roeder, G. Shirleen (12 February 1993). "ZIP1 is a synaptonemal complex protein required for meiotic chromosome synapsis". Cell. 72 (3): 365–378. doi:10.1016/0092-8674(93)90114-6. ISSN 0092-8674. PMID 7916652. S2CID 6174855.
- Roeder, G. Shirleen; Bailis, Julie M. (1 September 2000). "The pachytene checkpoint". Trends in Genetics. 16 (9): 395–403. doi:10.1016/S0168-9525(00)02080-1. ISSN 0168-9525. PMID 10973068.
- Ross-Macdonald, Petra; Roeder, G. Shirleen (16 December 1994). "Mutation of a meiosis-specific MutS homolog decreases crossing over but not mismatch correction". Cell. 79 (6): 1069–1080. doi:10.1016/0092-8674(94)90037-X. ISSN 0092-8674. PMID 8001134. S2CID 28539509.

== Awards and honors ==
In 1984, Roeder received a Young Investigator award from the National Science Foundation. She was named an HHMI investigator in 1997, and was elected to the National Academy of Sciences in 2009. In 2010, she was chosen as a Fellow of the American Association for the Advancement of Science and elected to the American Academy of Microbiology.
