= Ray David Owen =

American scientist and immunologist

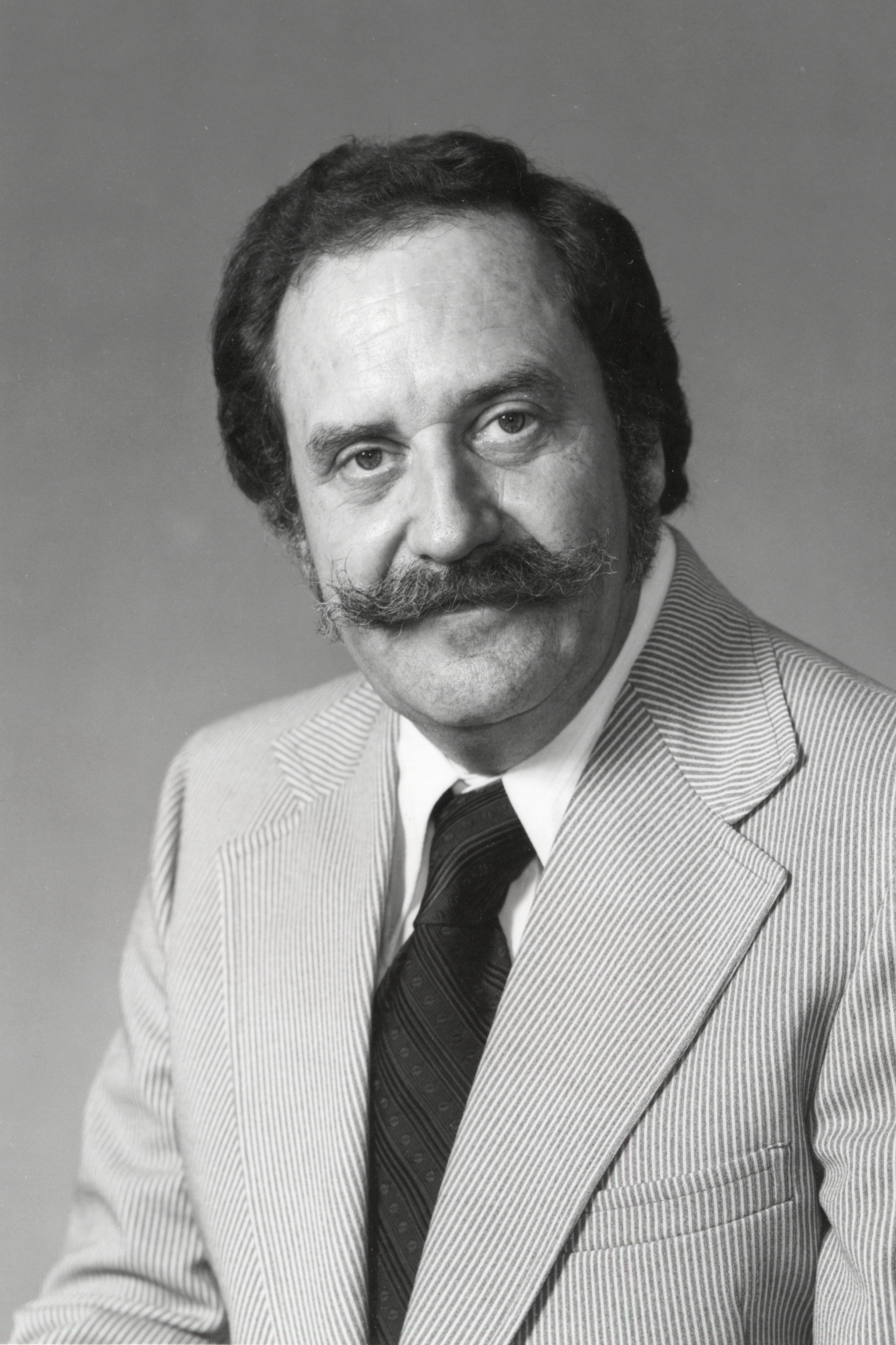
- Ray David Owen, 1979
- Born: October 30, 1915; Genesee, Wisconsin
- Died: September 21, 2014 (aged 98); Pasadena, California
- Education: Carroll College, University of Wisconsin–Madison (Ph.D. 1941)
- Known for: General Genetics (1952)
- Spouse: June Weissenberg
- Children: David, Griffin
- Awards: Thomas Hunt Morgan Medal, Peter Medawar Medal and Prize
- Scientific career
- Fields: Teaching, immunology, organ transplantation
- Workplaces: University of Wisconsin, California Institute of Technology

Ray David Owen (October 30, 1915 – September 21, 2014) was a teacher and scientist whose discovery of unusual, “mixed,” red blood cell types in cattle twins in 1945 launched the fields of modern immunology and organ transplantation. Owen's 1945 findings were published in the journal Science. This observation demonstrated that self was “learned” by the immune system during development and paved the way for research involving induction of immune tolerance and early tissue grafting. When Frank Macfarlane Burnet and Sir Peter Brian Medawar were awarded their 1960 Nobel Prize in Physiology or Medicine for the discovery of acquired immunological tolerance, Owen was not mentioned in the prize. However, in a letter to Owen, Medawar stated that he believed Owen should have also been included in the prize. Owen also led the successful effort to admit women as California Institute of Technology (or Caltech) undergraduates.

== Early life and education ==
Owen was born and raised on a dairy farm in Genesee, Wisconsin, on October 30, 1915. He attended school at the two-room Genesee State Graded School for eight years. He continued his education at a high school in Waukesha, commuting the eight miles to and from school every day from his family's farm. In 1937 Owen received a BS in biology from Carroll University (then Carroll College). In 1941 Owen received a PhD in genetics from the University of Wisconsin–Madison, where he continued to work as a postdoctoral researcher and assistant professor for several years. It was during this time that Owen conducted his seminal work in twin calves. In 1946 Owen moved to Pasadena, California, to join the biology department at Caltech as a Gosney Fellow.

== Research ==
As a PhD student Owen studied mainly birds; his thesis was on the sterility of species hybrids. As a postdoctoral fellow in the Immunogenetics Laboratory at the University of Wisconsin, Owen's research interests moved from fowl to cattle. The lab studied blood samples from cattle all over the world, investigating genetic markers and the inheritance of red blood cell antigens. This research led Owen to investigate a genetic situation involving twin calves fathered by different sires. Each calf expressed both sets of paternal blood group antigens. Owen's “analyses revealed that the twins were chimeric, each containing their own blood cells as well as those derived from their twin sibling.” These twins were immunologically compatible.

Owen's findings were published with little attention until Frank Macfarlane Burnet and Frank Fenner published their monograph “The Production of Antibodies” in 1949. It was through Burnet and Fenner's work that Peter Medawar learned of Owen's findings and used it to help explain his findings that dizygotic twin calves accept each other's skin grafts after birth. This eventually led to Burnet and Medawar's 1960 Nobel Prize in Physiology or Medicine for the discovery of acquired immunological tolerance. Owen's research continued in the field of immunology and genetics, especially tolerance and stem cells. He co-authored papers that described “the use of radiation as a means of blocking or resetting the immune system before transplantation of bone marrow or other tissues.”

== Career at Caltech ==
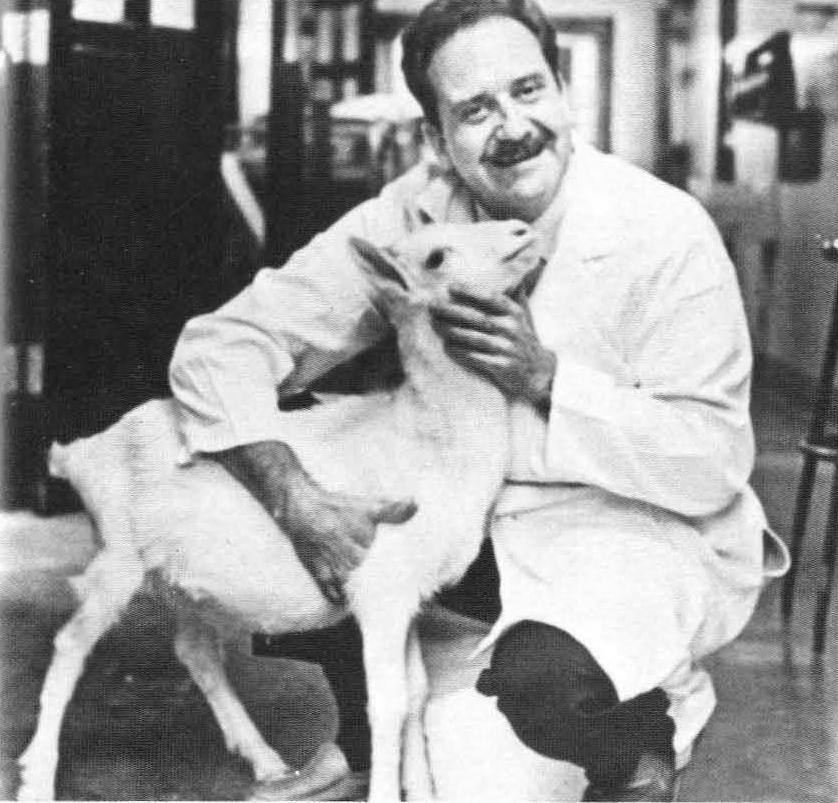
Owen in 1986

Caltech offered Owen an assistant professorship in biology in 1947. He earned full professorship in 1953 and was named professor emeritus in 1983. From 1961 to 1968, Owen served as chairman of the Caltech Division of Biology.

While Owen maintained an active research program, his teaching, mentoring and administrative undertakings became an important part of his academic career. Owen co-authored (with Adrian Srb) "General Genetics", published in 1952. It was the most widely read genetics textbook of its time.

In the early 1960s Owen chaired Caltech's ad hoc “Committee on the Freshman Year.” The committee's recommendations were adopted in 1964, including a pass/fail grading system for freshmen and the introduction of electives into the freshman curriculum. This committee also worked to allow women admission at Caltech; the university's first female undergraduate students enrolled in 1970. Owen also served as vice president for student affairs and dean of students from 1975 to 1980.

He was a supportive mentor and teacher to all learners. In an interview with the University of Wisconsin, Owen's son David opined that his father's rural upbringing influenced his career in many ways –- his work ethic, his skill at working with animals, and his support for women, minorities and other who faced undue obstacles on the path to careers in science. “He knew that talented people come from all backgrounds,” David Owen stated.

== Personal life ==
Owen met June Weissenberg—his wife of 74 years—at Carroll University. June died in August 2013. The couple had two sons, David and Griffin; Griffin died in a car accident in 1970.

== Notable awards ==
- Mendel Medal, 1966
- Elected Member, National Academy of Sciences (US), 1966
- Elected Member, American Philosophical Society, 1984
- Distinguished Alumnus Award for Professional Achievement from Carroll University, 1986
- Thomas Hunt Morgan Medal, 1993
- American Association of Immunologists Excellence in Mentoring Award, 1999
- Peter Medawar Medal and Prize, 2000
- Waukesha South High School Wall of Fame Induction, 2009

== Notable service ==
- President, Genetics Society of America, 1962
- Member (1958–1961), chairman (1961–1963), Genetics Study Section of the NIH
- Member (1966–1967), chairman (1967–1970), Immunobiology Study Section of the NIH
- Chairman, Genetics Section of the NAS, 1969-1972
- President's Cancer Panel, 1972-1975
