= Sarah Gorby =

Sarah Gorby (Russian: Сара Горби or Горбач, Sara Gorbi or Gorbach; Yiddish: שׂרה גאָרבי, Sarah Gorbi; 1900–1980) was a French singer (contralto) known for her performance of Jewish songs, Russian and Romany romances, and the work of French and Soviet composers. Her recording career spanned the 1940s to the 1970s.

== Early life ==
Sarah Gorby (Gorbach) was born in 1900 in Kishinev in Bessarabia Governorate, Russian Empire (today Chișinău, Moldova). Her parents, Zeylik Khaimovich Gorbach (originally from Stara Ushytsia) and his wife Beyla Kipelman, registered their marriage in Kishinev in 1898. During her childhood, the Gorby house was largely Yiddish-speaking. Gorby left Kishinev at age 17 to study music in Iași, Romania, where she married Joseph Goldstein, a publisher who spoke both Romanian and Yiddish.

Due to this cosmopolitan background, in her life she spoke many languages fluently. Her main languages were Yiddish and Russian, and she also spoke French, Romanian, Italian, Spanish, Portuguese, German, and English well. She moved to Rome and then to Paris in the 1920s, but returned to Iași every summer until the outbreak of World War II to visit her husband. She also toured South America regularly during the 1930s. For a time in the 1930s she performed with her husband's last name (Sarah Goldstein) before switching to the stage name Sarah Gorby.

She died in 1980 in Paris.

== Music career ==
In 1940, Gorby and her husband emigrated to Haiti and Gorby continued on to the United States. Around 1949, Gorby returned to Paris; upon her husband's death in Haiti in the 1950 she settled permanently in Paris.

After settling in Paris she recorded quite a lot under the label Eledisc, which was then releasing many Yiddish language singers. She also continued to tour regularly and spent months of the year away from France in places such as Mexico, South America, South Africa, and Israel. A noteworthy feature of her music was that she continued to sing in her native Bessarabian Yiddish dialect for much of her career.
