= White Collar-2 =

Protein in Neurospora crassa

The white collar--2 (wc-2) gene in Neurospora crassa encodes the protein White Collar-2 (WC-2). WC-2 is a GATA transcription factor necessary for blue light photoreception and for regulating circadian rhythms in Neurospora. In both contexts, WC-2 binds to its non-redundant counterpart White Collar-1 (WC-1) through PAS domains to form the White Collar Complex (WCC), an active transcription factor.

The WCC has two major and distinct roles in the cell. In the light, the WCC acts as a photoreceptor to mediate acute regulation of light-induced genes involved in various physiological processes such as carotenoid (type of pigment) biosynthesis and conidiation. In a separate and distinct role in the dark, WCC acts as the positive element in the autoregulatory transcription-translation negative feedback loop that controls circadian rhythmic behaviors in Neurospora. In this context, WCC regulates expression of the Frequency (FRQ) gene, a light-induced clock protein.

== Discovery ==
In 1959, Pittendrigh et al. discovered biological rhythms in asexual spore development in Neurospora. Later experiments revealed that the intrinsic period of Neurospora was 22 hours at 25°C and was temperature compensated. The period was also found to be nutritionally compensated and pH compensated. Since then, Neurospora has become a model organism for studying circadian clocks and rhythms.

WC-1 was first discovered from a wc-1 mutant that inhibited carotenoid biosynthesis in mycelia but not in conidia. Conidia produce carotenoid constitutively and don't require regulation by light, unlike mycelia which require light-induction. This mutant created a phenotype in which these strains of Neurospora developed conidia with pigmentation, but with no pigmentation in the mycelium. The conidia then appeared as if it had a non-pigmented border (or white collar) of mycelia around the conidia. WC-2 was later discovered when a second mutant caused the same phenotype as mutant wc-1. In 1982, Perkins et al. mapped all the gene loci of Neurospora crassa and located the wc-2 gene.

== Protein structure ==
WC-2 is a nuclear protein (56,895 Da) composed of 530 amino acids (aa).

WC-2 has a GATA-family Zinc finger (ZnF) DNA-binding motif that allows the WCC to bind to promoter elements of light-induced genes such as frq. The ZnF region of WC-2 has been shown to be very similar to that of WC-1. While WC-2 and WC-1 are a 26% identity match (47.5% similarity in sequence), these regions/functional domains have even higher identity matches, ranging from 33-62%. WC-2 also possesses a PAS domain that allows protein-protein interactions. WC-2 and WC-1 heterodimerize using homologous PAS domains to form the WCC in vivo.

The WCC binds to different types of DNA elements. In the promoter of the frq gene, there are two regions that can be bound by the WCC: a distal region that confers circadian regulation on frq that is known as the Clock Box and a site near the transcription start site that confers light regulation, known as the Proximal Light Regulatory Region, or PLRE. Both the Clock Box and PLRE are involved in achieving maximal light induction, and the Clock Box is essential for maintaining rhythmicity in darkness. Only the ZnF region of WC-2 is required for binding to the PLRE whereas the ZnF regions of both WC-1 and WC-2 are required for binding to the Clock Box.

== Function in circadian regulation ==
=== Role of WC-2 ===
WC-2 has been proven to be necessary for both clock-driven and light-driven expression of frq. Light-driven expression of frq relies on light as an input, occurs during daytime, and is mediated by the PLRE. Clock-driven expression occurs in dark conditions during the night and is mediated by a separate region of the frq promoter, the Clock Box. Prior to definitive gene knockouts for WC-1 and WC-2, there was some confusion in literature due to the use of alleles thought to be null mutants but that actually retained function (e.g. supposed WC-2 null allele ER33). However, definitive null alleles of either wc-1 or wc-2 are completely photo-blind and arrhythmic.

Experiments have shown that partial mutation of the WC-2 ZnF region leads to partial induction of frq expression, whereas complete knockout of the ZnF region leads to no expression. WC-2 mutants with altered ZnF sequences failed to bind to the frq promoter via the Clock Box, a DNA promoter element. This causes both FRQ expression and DNA binding activity to be significantly impaired. Therefore, these ZnF regions are essential for FRQ expression in light conditions and for WCC circadian function.

WC-2 plays a vital role in maintaining the rhythmicity of the circadian pacemaker in fungi. wc-2 null mutants prevent proper frq expression and cause arrhythmicity within the organism. Partial loss-of-function wc-2 alleles alter temperature compensation, an intrinsic clock property, and lengthen the period of Neurospora as temperature increases. While WC-1 can always be found in the promoter region of frq, WC-2 enters the promoter region to form the WCC and increase frq expression. WC-2 then dissociates once transcription of frq has been completed. It is thought that CK1 and CK2 are kinases that phosphorylate the WCC and reduce WC-2 binding after promotion from FRQ during mid-subjective day. This was determined via experiments reducing or extinguishing CK1 and/or CK2 activity which showed increased levels of WCC binding to the frq promoter.

WC-1 and WC-2 are thought to be the only non-redundant and non-essential genes that are involved in the positive regulation of light-induced mechanisms in Neurospora crassa. WC-1 and WC-2 are analogous to Bmal and Clock proteins in the Mouse and Drosophila circadian systems in their positive functions in the circadian loops.

WC-1 and WC-2 deletion strains show evidence of other light input pathways but these have not yet been identified.

=== Formation of White Collar Complex (WCC) ===
WC-1 and WC-2 are bound together to form the White Collar Complex (WCC) in cultures maintained in both light or dark. Of the two proteins, it is WC-1 that actually perceives light. WC-1 is a photoreceptor that binds flavin adenine dinucleotide (FAD) as a cofactor in a specialized PAS domain known as a LOV domain. FAD absorbs blue light and initiates the conformational change in WC-1 that leads to the organism's response to light. After exposure to light, a cysteine residue in the FAD binding pocket of WC-1 covalently bonds to FAD resulting in FAD changing its hydrogen bonding partner. This leads to other structural changes within WC-1 that eventually lead to the release of an alpha helix on the surface of WC-1, exposing a protein-protein interaction domain. It is then assumed that general transcription factors will initiate gene expression although the exact mechanism for this interaction is presently unknown. Nevertheless, the WCC drives expression of the frq gene and other light-dependent genes. WC-1 is always found at the frq promoter so promotion depends on the binding of WC-2. The general mechanism of interaction between WC-1 and WC-2 has been determined by looking at similar genes with LOV domains, such as VVD (Vivid) another blue light sensor used for photoadaptation. Vivid responds to changes in light intensity and can silence the expression of WC related genes.

In light conditions, WCC takes on the L-WCC conformation, a heterotrimer consisting of two WC-1s and one WC-2. In dark conditions, the WCC adopts a heterodimer conformation, (D-WCC) consisting of WC-1 and WC-2.

As described above, the WCC binds to the promoter of the frq gene in a cyclic manner due to phosphorylation of the WCC which reduces levels of WC-2 binding to the promoter when phosphorylated. The lowest level of WC-2 binding occurs at mid subjective day.

== Current research ==
More research is being done to elucidate the mechanism of interaction between WC-2 and other transcriptions factors as well as to thoroughly describe the interaction with WC-1 to form the White Collar Complex. The Dunlap and Loros laboratories are conducting further work to fully understand the circadian system of Neurospora crassa and believe it may be the first detailed molecular understanding of a complex circadian system.

== See also ==
- White Collar-1
- Frequency gene
- Neurospora crassa
