= Jennifer Loros =

Chronobiologist

- Born: 15 April 1950 (age 76); San Mateo, California
- Other name: JJ Loros
- Spouse: Jay Dunlap
- Awards: National Science Foundation Merit Award and Creativity Award, Aschoff's Ruler
- Scientific career
- Fields: Chronobiology, Biochemistry, Cell Biology, Molecular and Systems Biology

Jennifer Loros, also known as J.J. Loros, is a chronobiologist leading the field in the study of circadian rhythms in Neurospora. Her research focuses on circadian oscillators and their control of gene expression in living cells. Currently, Loros is a professor of Biochemistry, Cell Biology, and Molecular and Systems Biology at the Giesel School of Medicine.

== Biography ==
=== Education ===
Loros is from Los Altos, California. She attended Homestead High School and graduated in 1968. Loros then attended both Cabrillo College and Monterey Peninsula College and received two associate degrees in Biology by 1971.

By 1979, Loros received her bachelor's degree in Biology from UC Santa Cruz. She went on to complete her PhD in Genetics from Dartmouth Medical School.

=== Career (1988-present) ===
In 1988, Loros began her career in biology at Dartmouth Medical School as a postdoctoral researcher in Biochemistry. By 1994, Loros earned the position of Research Associate Professor of Biochemistry and then accepted the position of associate professor of Biochemistry in 1996. She then became Professor of Biochemistry and Professor of Genetics in 2000 and 2001 respectively.

Loros also leads research at the Dunlap and Loros Laboratories with her husband Jay Dunlap, a fellow chronobiologist and researcher. Her focus is on the circadian clock in Neurospora and its application to the genetic mechanisms of the clock in other organisms. Loros, along with Jay Dunlap and Patricia J. DeCoursey, co-authored the text book "Chronobiology: Biological Timekeeping " which was published on June 1, 2004. The text chronicles the field of chronobiology by exploring both past and current discoveries and their relevance to modern society.

== Scientific career ==
=== Advancements in methodology ===
Dr. Loros contributed to advancing research techniques by developing a targeted gene disruption technique for use in Neurospora, which had the effect of amplifying gene markers in such a manner as to make identification of low homologous recombination rates possible, which had previously not been the case when using traditional techniques such as Southern Blot tests. Gene identification in Neurospora was additionally progressed by Loros’ lab when it produced a high density SNP map for Neurospora.

Lastly, continuing on with an idea from her post-doc work, Loros resynthesized a gene that codes for firefly luciferase. Since Neurospora has long been a key model organism in the chronobiology field, modifying this tool has been key in further research. Before this, codon bias prevented effective usage of firefly luciferase in Neurospora, problematic as firefly luciferase serves as a reporter to measure transcription in cells. By modifying the firefly luciferase gene, Loros was able to achieve several orders more of light production in Neurospora, revolutionizing transcription measurements in N. cell cultures. Moreover, her modification to this reporter allowed the FRQ/WCC feedback loop to be monitored in real time without disturbing the overt rhythms of the system. This in turn provided the tool to distinguish between oscillators not directly in the clock and the circadian clock itself.

=== Research into clock-controlled genes and frq ===
After joining the faculty of the Giesel School of Medicine, Loros continued her post-doc research into the regulation of messenger RNA by circadian clocks. Through sequential rounds of subtractive hybridization, Loros found 2 such genes that are responsible for transcription in morning specific cultures of Neurospora. Loros named these two, unlinked, genes ccg-1 and ccg-2, with the initialisms standing for clock-controlled genes, a term which, now prevalent in the circadian clock dialogue, Loros claims to have coined herself. Moreover, her work on the negative feedback loop involved in the FRQ pathway demonstrated that the phosphorylation of negative elements of the clock are not as important in controlling the period as once thought. Loros and her collaborators showed that the nature of the FRQ allele controlled the pace of the clock, not the rate of phosphorylation and degradation of clock elements.

=== Research into photobiology, the White-Collar Complex, and Aspergillus fumigatus ===
During her post-doc work, Loros remarked upon the possibility of frq being light induced, which was later confirmed by a post-doc fellow. Turning her attention to the governing body for this light induction, Loros began experimenting with wc-1 finding that it not only was the mediator for said light induction, but was also necessary for Neurospora’s clock in the absence of light.

Wc-1, in conjunction with its partner protein, wc-2, was found to be the first described positive element regulator in a circadian feedback loop, with the norm being that of negative regulators. This led to the precedent of the PAS-PAS heterodimers in both animals and fungi alike.

=== The role of metabolism in the circadian system ===
Recently, Loros has worked on examining the reciprocal relationship between metabolism and circadian rhythm. Using Neurospora as her model organism, Loros’ work has revealed how interconnected these two crucial systems are in fungi. These links include both the outputs of each system and how metabolism can directly influence the rhythms set by the clock.
