= FMN-binding fluorescent protein =

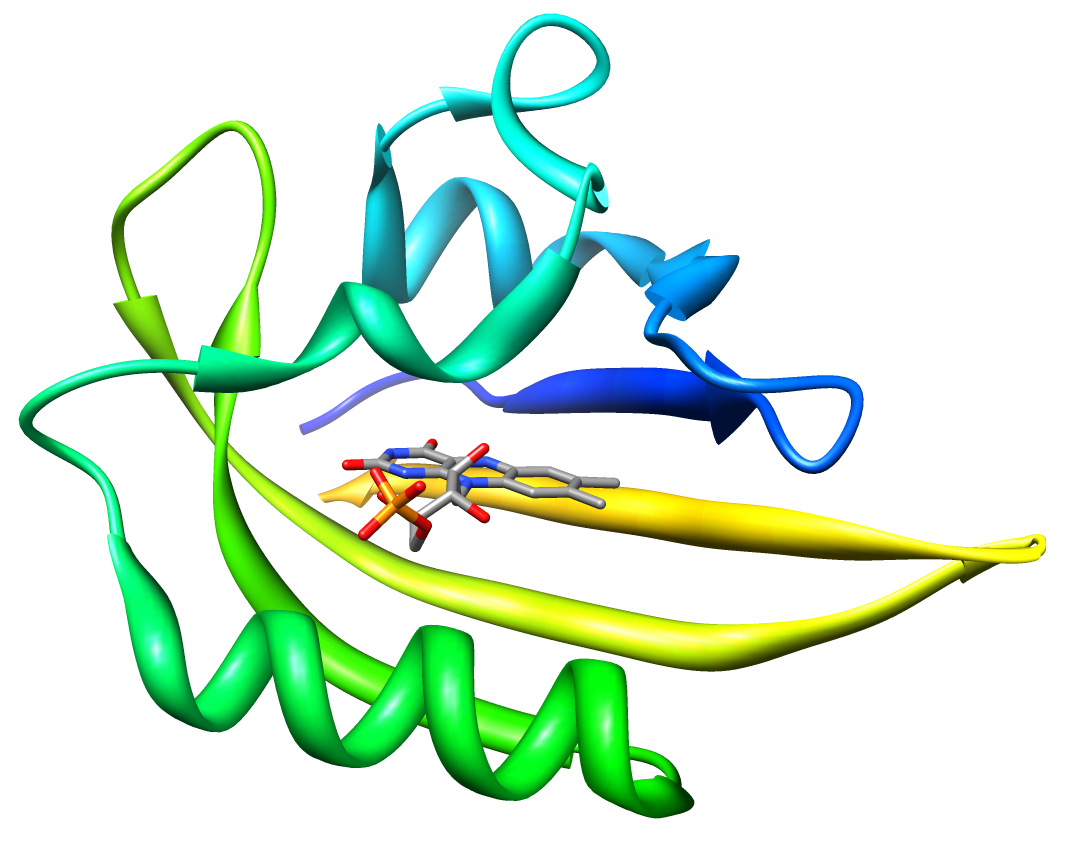
Typical core-domain of an FbFP (PDB: 2PR5)

A FMN-binding fluorescent protein (FbFP), also known as a LOV-based fluorescent protein, is a small, oxygen-independent fluorescent protein that binds flavin mononucleotide (FMN) as a chromophore.

They were developed from blue-light receptors (so called LOV-domains) found in plants and various bacteria. They complement the GFP-derivatives and –homologues and are particularly characterized by their independence of molecular oxygen and their small size. FbFPs absorb blue light and emit light in the cyan-green spectral range.

== Development ==
LOV-domains are a sub-class of PAS domains and were first identified in plants as part of Phototropin, which plays an essential role in the plant's growth towards light. They noncovalently bind Flavin mononucleotide (FMN) as cofactor. Due to the bound FMN LOV-domains exhibit an intrinsic fluorescence, which is however very weak. Upon illumination with blue light, LOV-domains undergo a photocycle, during which a covalent bond is formed between a conserved cysteine-residue and the FMN. This causes a conformational change in the protein that is necessary for signal propagation and also leads to the loss of fluorescence. The covalent bond is energetically unfavorable and is cleaved with a protein specific time constant ranging from seconds to hours. In order to make better use of the fluorescence properties of these proteins, the natural photocycle of these LOV-domains was abolished by exchanging the conserved cysteine against an alanine on a genetic level. Thus, upon blue light irradiation, the protein remains in the fluorescent state and also exhibits a brighter fluorescence.

The first FbFPs that were generated in this fashion were subsequently further optimized using different methods of mutagenesis. Especially the brightness but also the photostability of the proteins were enhanced and their spectral characteristics altered.

== Spectral characteristics ==
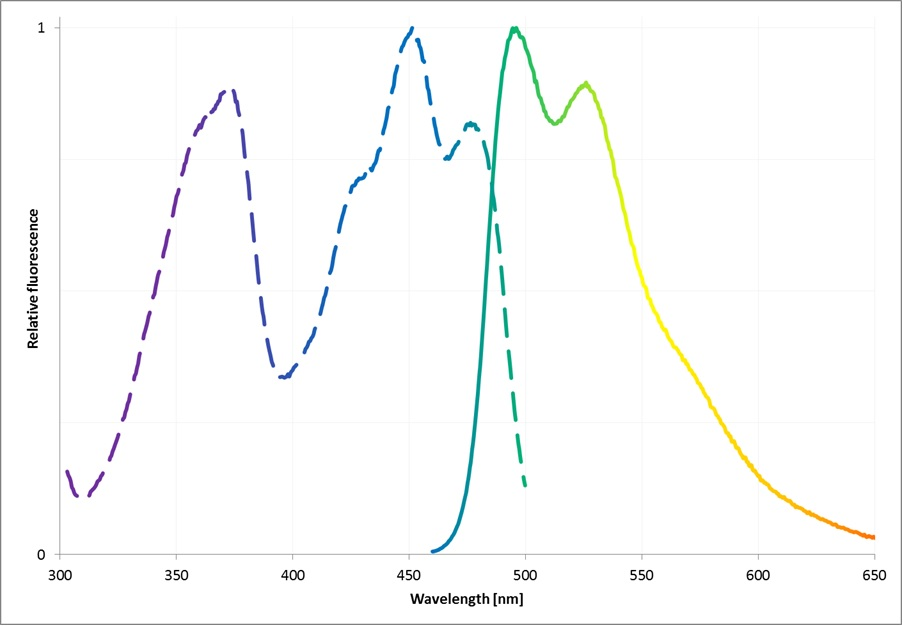
Typical excitation and emission spectrum of FMN-binding fluorescent proteins (FbFPs)

Typically FbFPs have an excitation maximum at a wavelength of approximately 450 nm (blue light) and a second distinct excitation peak around 370 nm (UV-A light). The main emission peak is at approx. 495 nm, with a shoulder around 520 nm. One variant of Pp2FbFP (Q116V) exhibits a 10 nm blue shift in both the excitation and emission spectra. Rationally designed variants of iLOV and CagFbFP exhibit 6 and 7 nm red shifts, respectively.

== Photophysical properties ==
The photophysical properties of the FbFPs are determined by the chromophore itself and its chemical surrounding in the protein. The extinction coefficient (ε) is around 14.200 M^{−1}cm^{−1} at 450 nm for all described FbFPs, which is slightly higher than that of free FMN (ε = 12.200 M^{−1}cm^{−1}). The Fluorescence-Quantum yield (Φ) varies significantly between different FbFPs and ranges from 0.2 (phiLOV2.1) to 0.44 (EcFbFP and iLOV). This represents an almost twofold increase compared to free FMN (Φ = 0.25).
The difference to free FMN is even more significant in the case of the photostability, the proteins resistance to bleach out during prolonged and intense irradiation with blue light. Based on the bleaching-halftime (the times it takes to reduce the initial fluorescence intensity to 50% upon illumination) the genetically engineered variant phiLOV2.1 is approximately 40x as stable as free FMN. This stabilizing effect can be observed for almost all FbFPs, although it is usually in the range of 5x - 10x.
The average fluorescence lifetime of FbFPs is in the range of 3.17 (Pp2FbFP) and 5.7 ns (e.g. EcFbFP). They are thereby much longer than the ones of GFP derivatives, which are usually between 1,5 and 3 ns. FbFPs are therefore well suited as donor domains in Förster resonance energy transfer (FRET) systems in conjunction with GFP derivatives like YFP as acceptor domains.

== Advantages and disadvantages ==
The main advantage of FbFPs over GFP is their independence of molecular oxygen. Since all GFP derivatives and homologues require molecular oxygen for the maturation of their chromophore, these fluorescent proteins are of limited use under anaerobic or hypoxic conditions. Since FbFPs bind FMN as chromophore, which is synthesized independently of molecular oxygen, their fluorescence signal does not differ between aerobic and anaerobic conditions.
Another advantage is the small size of FbFPs, which is typically between 100 and 150 amino acids. This is about half the size of GFP (238 amino acids). It could for example be shown that this renders them superior tags for monitoring tobacco mosaic virus infections in tobacco leaves.
Due to their extraordinary long average fluorescence lifetime of up to 5.7 ns they are also very well suited for the use as donor domains in FRET systems in conjunction with e.g. YFP (see photophysical properties). A fusion of EcFbFP and YFP was e.g. used to develop the first genetically encoded fluorescence biosensor for oxygen (FluBO)

The main disadvantage compared to GFP variants is their lower brightness (the product of ε and Φ). The commonly used EGFP (ε = 55,000 M^{−1}cm^{−1}; Φ = 0.60) for example is approximately five times as bright as EcFbFP.
Another disadvantage of the FbFPs is the lack of color variants to tag and distinguish multiple proteins in a single cell or tissue. The largest spectral shift reported for FbFPs so far is 10 nm. Although this variant (Pp2FbFP Q116V) can be visually distinguished from the others with the human eye, the spectral differences are too small for fluorescence microscopy filters.
