= David J. L. Luck =

American cell biologist

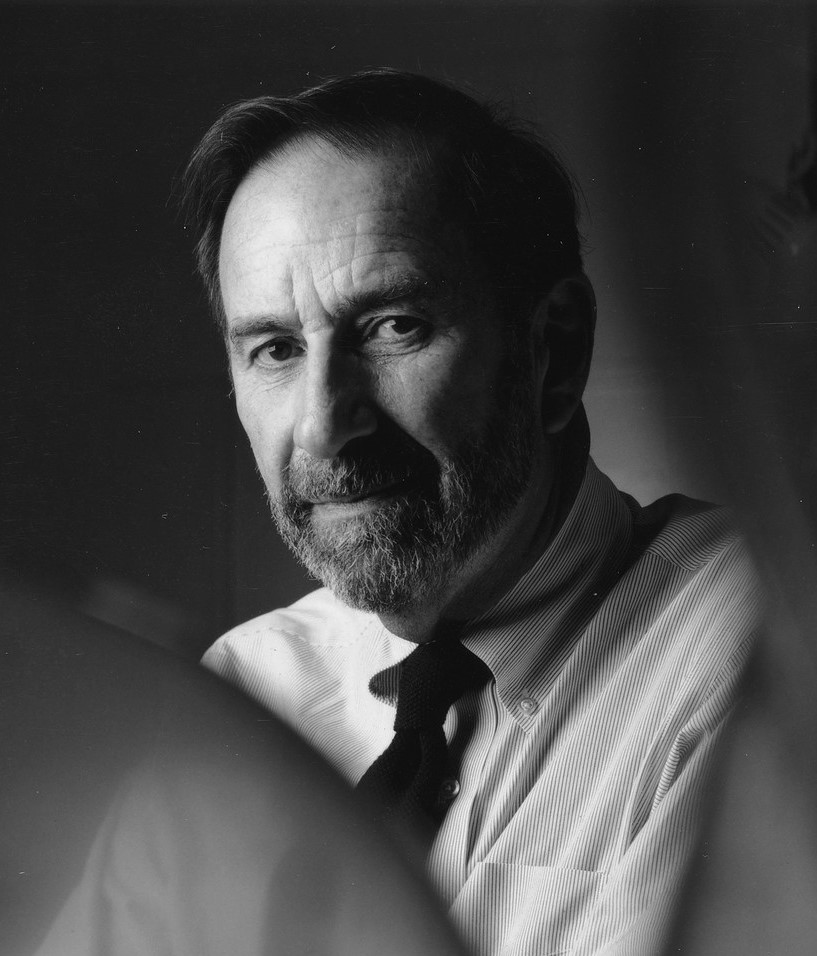
David J. L. Luck, ca. 1994

David J. L. Luck (January 7, 1929 – May 23, 1998) was an American cell biologist known for his work on flagella and mitochondrial DNA. He was a longtime professor at Rockefeller University and a member of the U.S. National Academy of Sciences.

== Early life and education ==
David Jonathan Lewis Luck was born January 7, 1929, in Milwaukee. He had an early interest in science, perhaps influenced by his aunt and uncle who were a chemist and physician respectively. Luck graduated from the University of Chicago in 1949, then earned his M.D. from Harvard Medical School in 1953. Following his M.D., Luck was an intern at Massachusetts General Hospital, from which he was drafted into the Army Medical Corps. In 1957, he returned to Massachusetts General.

In 1958, Luck moved to Rockefeller University with the aim of completing a PhD. He worked in the laboratory of George Palade on glycogen particles in the liver, defending his thesis in 1961. Following his PhD, Luck worked with Edward Tatum on the mitochondria of the mold Neurospora crassa. Along with Tatum's student Ed Reich, Luck was the first to isolate mitochondrial DNA and show that it was inherited maternally when Neurospora mate.

== Academic career ==
In 1964, Luck was promoted to research associate and professor at Rockefeller. Luck's research group went on to show that the ribosomal RNAs in mitochondria were synthesized in the mitochondria (rather than in the cell nucleus). By 1970, Luck was promoted to full professor. In 1972, with student Paul Lizardi, Luck's group showed that in contrast to the ribosomal RNAs, mitochondrial ribosome-associated proteins were made in the cytoplasm and transported into the mitochondria. In the mid-1970s, Luck's group pivoted to focus on the single-celled alga Chlamydomonas reinhardtii, where he focused on centrioles and basal bodies, the microtubule organizing structures that underlie the mitotic spindle and formation of flagella. Luck's group identified around a dozen flagellar proteins, as well as numerous mutations that affected flagellar structure and function.

Luck was elected to the U.S. National Academy of Sciences in 1984.

== Death ==
Luck died of lymphoma at New York Hospital on May 23, 1998.
