= Plant nucleus movement =

Plant nucleus movement is the movement of the cell nucleus in plants by the cytoskeleton.

== In response to stimuli ==
An important aspect of plant behavior includes responding to directional stimuli, which requires changes in the cellular signaling to control spatial elements. The integration of the stimuli in plant cells is not fully understood, but the movement of the cell nucleus provides one example of a cellular process that underlies plant behavior, and highlights the importance of the cytoskeleton in solving spatial problems within the plant cell. Unlike the static nature typically depicted in textbooks, the plant cell nucleus is a highly dynamic structure, constantly moving around cells via actin networks and myosins. The nucleus undergoes a characteristic program during cell division to guide asymmetric cell division, but there are several stimuli that have been demonstrated to cause movements of the nucleus in the plant cell.

=== Blue light ===
A well-studied stimulus is strong blue light, which drives movement of nuclei to anticlinal (perpendicular to the plane of the leaf) cell walls in mesophyll and epidermal cells of Arabidopsis thaliana plants. Chloroplasts moving in response to blue light associate with the nucleus to move the nucleus to the appropriate location. This is highly dependent on the blue light receptor phototropin and the actin cytoskeleton, as actin bundles are seen to form along the anticlinal wall in blue light. A protein called ANGUSTIFOLIA was also recently discovered to regulate nucleus movement in the dark by forming a complex that adjusts the alignment of actin filaments. The movement of the nucleus in response to blue light may serve several physiological purposes. The first is to avoid damaging mutations caused by UV radiation, as the nucleus stores the genetic material of a cell. A key problem faced as photosynthetic organisms transitioned from ocean to land was avoiding excessive mutations caused by UV radiation, but by moving the nucleus in response to light, damage caused by UV light could be limited. Another purpose may be to localize the nucleus near key receptors, such as phytochrome, to facilitate spatial integration and transduction of cellular signals into the nucleus, especially when considering the necessity of phytochrome import into the nucleus for changes in gene expression in response to red light.

=== Mechanical stimulation ===
Nuclear movement also occurs in response to mechanical stimulation. The nuclei of cultured ovule parenchyma tobacco cells were found to move directly to the site of probing by a fine glass pipette via cytoplasmic strands, which contain actin filaments specialized to carry out cytoplasmic streaming. This is likely a response co-opted from cytoplasmic streaming, but a receptor or other downstream signaling components underlying this cellular response have not been identified. Nonetheless, mechanical stimulation is a potent signal resulting in nuclear movement, and suggests that nuclear movement may be a process important for integration of mechanical stimulation during thigmotropism, gravitropism, or cellular interactions during development.

=== Symbionts ===
Recognition of microbial organisms also results in nuclear movement. During colonization by beneficial rhizobia, which begins at the root hair tip, the nucleus moves to the site of colonization and guides the formation and direction of movement of the infection thread, a structure that houses the colonizing rhizobium. This requires large scale cytoskeletal rearrangement, as well as cytoskeleton-mediated movement of the nucleus. Similarly, arbuscular mycorrhizae symbiosis involves extensive nuclear movement, which appears to guide formation of microtubule structures that steers penetration by the fungal hypha.

=== Pathogens ===
Importantly, cytoskeleton-mediated nuclear movement is critical for response of plants to pathogenic microorganisms. This is best studied in oomycetes, a devastating pathogenic organism. In potato cells, oomycete contact results in rapid movement of the nucleus to the site of contact, which initiates rapid deposition of cell wall material and restructuring of the cytoplasmic elements. This can block invasion by the oomycete, or if the oomycete successfully penetrates the cell, can initiate a hypersensitive response, killing the cell and preventing further propagation of the pathogen. However, in plants that are not resistant to oomycete infection, the nucleus does not move to the site of oomycete contact, and the oomycete proceeds to devastate the plant, indicating the importance of nuclear transport for resistance against oomycete pathogens.

These examples of nuclear movement in response to the biotic and abiotic stimuli highlight the role of the nucleus as a highly mobile command center necessary for the integration of cell signaling and also emphasize the importance of cytoskeletal structure in mediating the transduction of signaling from outside the cell to the nucleus. However, there is still a great deal left unknown in how exactly an extracellular stimulus leads to cytoskeletal rearrangement, nuclear movement, and ultimately integration of stimuli to guide plant behavior.
