= SMAP1 =

Protein-coding gene in humans

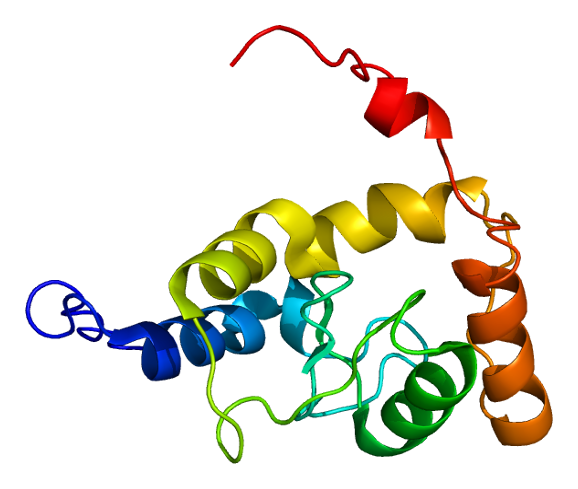

Identifiers
- Aliases: SMAP1, SMAP-1, small ArfGAP 1
- External IDs: OMIM: 611372; MGI: 2138261; GeneCards: SMAP1
Available structures
PDB	Ortholog search: PDBe RCSB
PDB	List of PDB id codes 2CRR

Gene location (Human)
Chr.	Chromosome 6 (human)
Band	6q13	Start	70,667,776 bp
Band	6q13	End	70,862,011 bp

Gene location (Mouse)
Chr.	Chromosome 1 (mouse)
Band	1|1 A5	Start	23,883,927 bp
Band	1|1 A5	End	23,961,398 bp
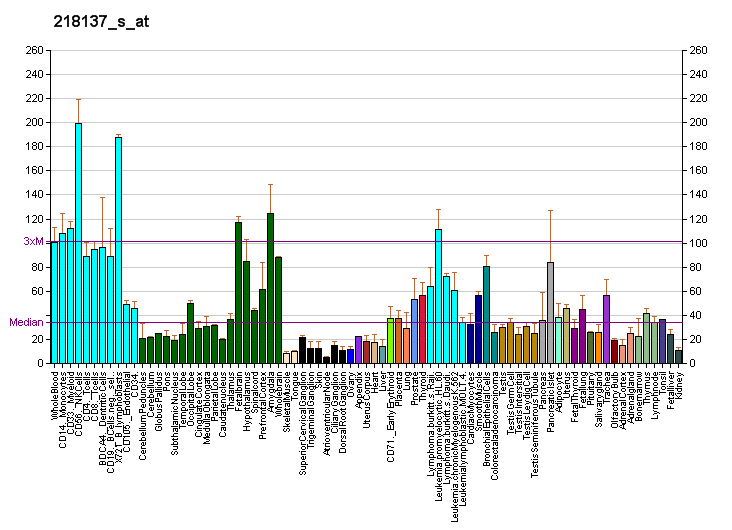
RNA expression pattern
Bgee	Human / Mouse (ortholog); Top expressed in: jejunal mucosa; mucosa of sigmoid colon; oral cavity; pons; mucosa of pharynx; duodenum; skin of thigh; skin of hip; islet of Langerhans; ganglionic eminence / Top expressed in: blood; genital tubercle; tail of embryo; seminiferous tubule; spermatid; dentate gyrus of hippocampal formation granule cell; neural layer of retina; superior frontal gyrus; calvaria; gastrula; More reference expression data
BioGPS	More reference expression data
Gene ontology
Molecular function	clathrin binding; metal ion binding; GTPase activator activity
Cellular component	cytoplasm; plasma membrane; membrane
Biological process	positive regulation of GTPase activity; regulation of clathrin-dependent endocytosis; positive regulation of erythrocyte differentiation
Sources:Amigo / QuickGO
Orthologs
Databases	NCBI: entry; OMA: entry
Species	Human	Mouse
Entrez	60682	98366
Ensembl	ENSG00000112305	ENSMUSG00000026155
UniProt	Q8IYB5	Q91VZ6
RefSeq (mRNA)	NM_001044305; NM_001281439; NM_001281440; NM_021940	NM_001290683; NM_028534; NM_001357395
RefSeq (protein)	NP_001037770; NP_001268368; NP_001268369; NP_068759	NP_001277612; NP_082810; NP_001344324
Location (UCSC)	Chr 6: 70.67 – 70.86 Mb	Chr 1: 23.88 – 23.96 Mb
PubMed search
- Wikidata
View/Edit Human	View/Edit Mouse

Stromal membrane-associated protein 1 is a protein that in humans is encoded by the SMAP1 gene.

The protein encoded by this gene is similar to the mouse stromal membrane-associated protein-1. This similarity suggests that this human gene product is also a type II membrane glycoprotein involved in the erythropoietic stimulatory activity of stromal cells. Alternate splicing results in multiple transcript variants encoding different isoforms.
