= WC2 =

WC2 may stand for:

- WC2, a postcode district in the WC postcode area for central London
- White Collar-2, a blue light photoreceptor in fungi
- Wing Commander II: Vengeance of the Kilrathi, a 1991 space combat simulation video game
- Warcraft II: Tides of Darkness, a 1995 real-time strategy video game
  - Warcraft II: Beyond the Dark Portal, expansion pack to Tides of Darkness
- WC2 University Network, a network of universities around the world
