= WC1 =

WC1 can refer to:

- Warcraft: Orcs and Humans, the first Warcraft computer game
- WC1, a postcode district in the WC postcode area for central London
- Wing Commander (video game), the first Wing Commander video game
- White Collar-1, a blue light photoreceptor in fungi
