= David Perkins (geneticist) =

American geneticist

David Dexter Perkins
- Born: May 2, 1919
- Died: January 2, 2007 (aged 87)
- Education: Columbia University
- Occupation: Geneticist
- Awards: Thomas Hunt Morgan Medal (1994)

David Dexter Perkins (May 2, 1919 – January 2, 2007) was an American geneticist, a member of the faculty of the Department of Biology at Stanford University for more than 58 years, from 1948 until his death in 2007. He received his PhD in Zoology in 1949 from Columbia University. A member of the National Academy of Sciences, he served as president of the Genetics Society of America in 1977. In a scientific career that spanned more than six decades, Perkins collaborated on more than 300 papers. His associates included many graduate students and postdoctoral fellows who went on to scientific careers throughout the world.

== Scientific career ==
Upon his arrival at Stanford, he began a collaboration with Edward Tatum, who had been working with Neurospora crassa since 1941 in collaboration with George Beadle. In this way, he was connected to the very earliest research with Neurospora. Throughout his career, he continued to work with Neurospora crassa, which he often championed as a model organism. At the time that he died in 2007, a substantial percentage of all researchers in the world who were working with Neurospora crassa had either trained with or collaborated with Perkins or one of his students or associates.

Perkins is best known for his research into the control and regulation of cell division and sexual reproduction in fungi. One of the advantages to Neurospora as a model organism is that it undergoes both sexual and asexual reproduction.

- Working with associates, Perkins identified many of the genes that control meiotic cell division in Neurospora crassa. In the process, he made fundamental discoveries about the cellular regulation and control of meosis.
- Building on his discoveries about meiosis, Perkins carried out investigations into ascospore genesis. Ascospore genesis, a form of sexual reproduction common to many fungi, has parallels with oogenesis and spermatogenesis in mammals and other chordates. Many of his papers in this area were concerned with genetic recombination, with the rearrangement of genes on paired chromosomes that occurs during reproduction, a phenomenon known as crossing over. Perkins developed techniques for mapping genes and centromeres on chromosomes based on the occasional errors, such as duplications and translocations, that occur in recombination.
- He trained many scientists to work with Neurospora crassa, and wrote several papers on working with, caring for, and maintaining Neurospora under laboratory conditions. He was instrumental in establishing and supporting the Fungal Genetics Stock Center. In 1968, he began a project to obtain wild type Neurospora at tropical and subtropical sites throughout the world. Perkins and his associates surveyed and collected more than 5,000 specimens of Neurospora and other fungi growing in the wild. Later, he initiated work on what would eventually become a worldwide resource for geneticists, The Neurospora Compendium: Chromosomal Loci. Published most recently in 2001, it serves as a reference for mutations and their loci in the Neurospora genome.
