= Gene product =

Biochemical material

A gene product is the biochemical material, either RNA or protein, resulting from the expression of a gene. A measurement of the amount of gene product is sometimes used to infer how active a gene is. Abnormal amounts of gene product can be correlated with disease-causing alleles, such as the overactivity of oncogenes, which can cause cancer. A gene is defined as "a hereditary unit of DNA that is required to produce a functional product". Regulatory elements include:

- Promoter region
- TATA box
- Polyadenylation sequences
- Enhancers

These elements work in combination with the open reading frame to create a functional product. This product may be transcribed and be functional as RNA or is translated from mRNA to a protein to be functional in the cell.

== RNA products ==
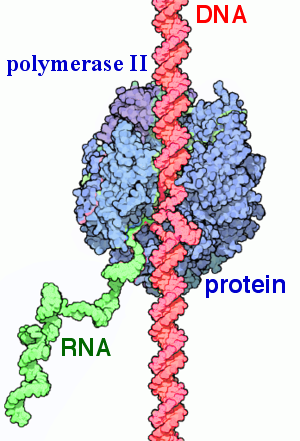
Transcription of DNA to RNA using the protein RNA polymerase II.

RNA molecules that do not code for any proteins still maintain a function in the cell. The function of the RNA depends on its classification. These roles include:

- aiding protein synthesis
- catalyzing reactions
- regulating various processes.

Protein synthesis is aided by functional RNA molecules such as tRNA, which helps add the correct amino acid to a polypeptide chain during translation, rRNA, a major component of ribosomes (which guide protein synthesis), as well as mRNA which carry the instructions for creating the protein product.

One type of functional RNA involved in regulation is microRNA (miRNA), which works by repressing translation. These miRNAs work by binding to a complementary target mRNA sequence to prevent translation from occurring. Short-interfering RNA (siRNA) also works by negative regulation of transcription. These siRNA molecules work in RNA-induced silencing complex (RISC) during RNA interference by binding to a target DNA sequence to prevent transcription of a specific mRNA.

== Protein products ==
Proteins are the product of a gene that are formed from translation of a mature mRNA molecule. Proteins contain 4 elements in regards to their structure: primary, secondary, tertiary and quaternary. The linear amino acid sequence is also known as the primary structure. Hydrogen bonding between the amino acids of the primary structure results in the formation of alpha helices or beta sheets. These stable foldings are the secondary structure. The particular combination of the primary and secondary structures form the tertiary structure of a polypeptide. The quaternary structure refers to the way multiple chains of polypeptides fold together.

=== Protein functions ===
Proteins have many different functions in a cell and the function may vary based on the polypeptides they interact with and their cellular environment. Chaperone proteins work to stabilize newly synthesized proteins. They ensure the new protein folds into its correct functional conformation in addition to making sure products do not aggregate in areas where they should not. Proteins can also function as enzymes, increasing the rate of various biochemical reactions and turning substrates into products. Products can be modified by attaching groups such as phosphate via an enzyme to specific amino acids in the primary sequence. Proteins can also be used to move molecules in the cell to where they are needed, these are called motor proteins. The shape of the cell is supported by proteins. Proteins such as actin, microtubules and intermediate filaments provide structure to the cell. Another class of proteins are found in plasma membranes. Membrane proteins can be associated with the plasma membrane in different ways, depending on their structure. These proteins allow the cell to import or export cell products, nutrients or signals to and from the extracellular space. Other proteins help the cell to perform regulatory functions. For example, transcription factors bind to DNA to help transcription of RNA.

== Genetic code ==
In 1941, American geneticist George Beadle and biochemist Edward Tatum proposed, on the basis of their study of mutants of the fungus Neurospora sitophila, that genes control specific biochemical reactions. They suggested that the functioning of an organism depends on an integrated system of chemical reactions controlled in some manner by genes. They further noted that "It is entirely tenable to suppose that these genes, which are themselves a part of the system, control or regulate specific reactions in the system either by acting directly as enzymes or by determining the specificity of enzymes." This line of reasoning gave rise to the "one gene–one enzyme hypothesis".

In a retrospective article, Beadle discussed the status of the one gene-one enzyme hypothesis 10 years after it was proposed. Beadle commented on the Cold Spring Harbor Symposium meeting of biologists in 1951. He noted "I have the impression that the number whose faith in one gene-one enzyme remained steadfast could be counted on the fingers of one hand—with a couple of fingers left over." However, by the early 1960s, the concept that the DNA base sequence of a gene specifies the amino acid sequence of a protein became well established on the basis of numerous experiments. For example, an experiment by Crick, Brenner, Barnett, and Watts-Tobin in 1961 demonstrated that each amino acid in a protein is encoded by a corresponding sequence of three bases in DNA, called a codon. Soon after this, the specific codon assignments for each amino acid were determined.
