= White Collar-1 =

Blue light photoreceptor in fungi

Identifiers
- Organism: N. crassa
- Symbol: wc-1
- Entrez: 3875924
- RefSeq (mRNA): XM_011396849
- RefSeq (Prot): XP_011395151
- UniProt: Q01371
Search for
- Structures: Swiss-model
- Domains: InterPro

White Collar-1 (wc-1) is a gene in Neurospora crassa encoding the protein WC-1 (127 kDa). WC-1 has two separate roles in the cell. First, it is the primary photoreceptor for Neurospora and the founding member of the class of principle blue light photoreceptors in all of the fungi. Second, it is necessary for regulating circadian rhythms in FRQ. It is a key component of a circadian molecular pathway that regulates many behavioral activities, including conidiation. WC-1 and WC-2, an interacting partner of WC-1, comprise the White Collar Complex (WCC) that is involved in the Neurospora circadian clock. WCC is a complex of nuclear transcription factor proteins, and contains transcriptional activation domains, PAS domains, and zinc finger DNA-binding domains (GATA). WC-1 and WC-2 heterodimerize through their PAS domains to form the White Collar Complex (WCC).

== Discovery ==
The Neurospora circadian clock was discovered in 1959, when Pittendrigh et al. first described timing patterns in the asexual development of spores. They noticed that in the region of the growing front, mycelia laid down between the late night to early morning formed aerial hyphae, whereas those laid down at other times did not. This aerial growth pattern at subjective circadian times served as tentative support for the presence of circadian oscillators.

White Collar-1 was described in the 1960s by geneticists who saw a strain of Neurospora which the mycelia were albino, but the conidia were normally pigmented.

The mutant gene was designated white collar (wc), for the white coloration of the mycelia below the pigmented conidia on agar slants. The gene wc-1 was classified during the mapping of the chromosomal loci of Neurospora crassa (1982 by Perkins et al.).

== Protein structure ==
WC-1 and WC-2 are transcription factors encoded by the genes wc-1 and wc-2. Zinc finger DNA-binding domains (GATA) allow WC-1 and WC-2 to bind to DNA and act as transcription factors.

Both WC-1 and WC-2 have PAS domains that allow them to bind to other proteins. WC-1 and WC-2 typically heterodimerize in vivo to form the White Collar Complex (WCC), which acts as a transcription factor complex. In vitro, WC-1 can also homodimerize with itself and heterodimerize with other PAS proteins.

Protein sequencing has revealed WC-1 to also contain a LOV domain, a chromophore-binding peptide region. This binding site is highly conserved, and is sequentially similar to the chromophore-binding domains of phototropins in plants.

WC-1 and WC-2 bind to the promoter elements of the genes that they transcriptionally activate.

== Function in the circadian clock ==
=== Photoreception ===
WC-1 has been shown to be a blue-light photoreceptor, and is a necessary component of the Neurospora light-induced response pathway. Genetic screens of light-insensitive Neurospora mutant strains have repeatedly demonstrated abnormalities in the wc-1 gene. In functional Neurospora, the WC-1 LOV domain binds to the flavin adenine dinucleotide (FAD) chromophore, which is responsible for the conversion of light to mechanical energy. FAD displays maximum absorption of light at 450 nm, thus explaining WC-1's maximal sensitivity to blue light.

Light-induced responses are completely eliminated in WC-1 LOV knockout Neurospora mutants, although WC-1's transcription activation role persists in the dark. WC-1 is widely conserved among fungi where it appears to be the principle blue light photoreceptor for the entire kingdom.

=== Circadian regulation ===
Simplified Representation of Neurospora Circadian Clock. WC-1 and WC-2 (WCC) act as positive activators of frq transcription. FRQ protein binds to an RNA helicase, FRH, and to CK1 forming a complex. This complex interacts with WCC, promoting phosphorylation of WCC. Phosphorylation stabilizes WCC and promotes its export to the cytoplasm, effectively down-regulating frq transcription.

The White Collar Complex (WCC), the heterodimer of WC-1 and WC-2, acts as a positive element in the circadian clock. WCC serves as an activator of frq gene transcription by binding to two DNA promotor elements in the nucleus: the Clock box (C box) and the Proximal Light-Response Element (PLRE). PLRE is required for maximal light induction, while the C box is required for both maximal light induction and maintaining circadian rhythmicity in constant darkness.

In addition, light-activated WCC is shown to induce the transcription of VIVID, a small flavin-binding blue-light photoreceptor that is required for adaptation to light-induced responses in the transcription of light-induced genes, including wc-1 and frq. VIVID is a negative regulator of light responses, although its mechanism is not yet known.

As part of the transcription-translation negative feedback-loop (TTFL), FRQ protein enters the nucleus and interacts with FRQ-interacting RNA Helicase (FRH) to promote the repression of WCC activity. This FRQ–FRH complex is suggested to recruit protein kinases such as casein kinase (CK I) and CK II to phosphorylate WCC. The phosphorylation of the WCC stabilizes WCC, preventing it from binding and activating frq transcription. Protein phosphatases PP2A and PP4 are known to counterbalance kinase activity and support the reactivation and nuclear entry of WCC.

FRQ has also been shown to interact with WC-2 in vitro, and a partial loss-of-function allele of wc-2 yields Neurospora with a long period length and altered temperature compensation, which is a key characteristic of circadian pacemakers.

Only WC-1 is required for transient light-induction, but both WC-1 and WC-2 are required for the circadian clock to run. Because the core of the clock is based on a rhythmic expression of frq, the acute light-induction pathway provides a direct way to reset the clock. Mammalian clocks can be reset through a similar mechanism, via the light-induction of the mammalian per genes within the SCN.

Several WC-1 mutants are known. The rhy-2 mutation was localized to the polyglutamine region of the WC-1 gene product. The rhy-2 mutant is arrhythmic with regard to conidiation in constant darkness, but rhythmic in a light-dark cycle. Rhy-2 is also only weakly sensitive to light, suggesting that the polyglutamine region may be essential for both clock function and light sensing in Neurospora.

== See also ==
- Frequency gene
- LOV domain
- Oscillating gene
- PAS domain
