= Light-oxygen-voltage-sensing domain =

A Light-oxygen-voltage-sensing domain (LOV domain) is a protein sensor used by a large variety of higher plants, microalgae, fungi and bacteria to sense environmental conditions. In higher plants, they are used to control phototropism, chloroplast relocation, and stomatal opening, whereas in fungal organisms, they are used for adjusting the circadian temporal organization of the cells to the daily and seasonal periods. They are a subset of PAS domains and exhibit a wide diversity in their light-activation and dark-recovery kinetics across taxa.

== Chromophore ==
Common to all LOV proteins is the blue-light sensitive flavin chromophore, which in the signaling state is covalently linked to the protein core via an adjacent cysteine residue. In multidomain LOV proteins, formation of this cysteinyl–flavin adduct can trigger conformational changes that propagate to adjacent effector domains, thereby coupling photochemistry to diverse downstream outputs. LOV domains are e.g. encountered in phototropins, which are blue-light-sensitive protein complexes regulating a great diversity of biological processes in higher plants as well as in micro-algae. Phototropins are composed of two LOV domains, each containing a non-covalently bound flavin mononucleotide (FMN) chromophore in its dark-state form, and a C-terminal Ser-Thr kinase.

Upon blue-light absorption, a covalent bond between the FMN chromophore and an adjacent reactive cysteine residue of the apo-protein is formed in the LOV2 domain. This subsequently mediates the activation of the kinase, which induces a signal in the organism through phototropin autophosphorylation.

While the photochemical reactivity of the LOV2 domain has been found to be essential for the activation of the kinase, the in vivo functionality of the LOV1 domain within the protein complex still remains unclear.

== Fungus ==
In case of the fungus Neurospora crassa, the circadian clock is controlled by two light-sensitive domains, known as the white-collar-complex (WCC) and the LOV domain vivid (VVD-LOV). WCC is primarily responsible for the light-induced transcription on the control-gene frequency (FRQ) under day-light conditions, which drives the expression of VVD-LOV and governs the negative feedback loop onto the circadian clock. By contrast, the role of VVD-LOV is mainly modulatory and does not directly affect FRQ.

== Natural and engineered functions of LOV domains ==
LOV domains have been found to control gene expression through DNA binding and to be involved in redox-dependent regulation, like e.g. in the bacterium Rhodobacter sphaeroides. Notably, LOV-based optogenetic tools have been gaining wide popularity in recent years to control a myriad of cellular events, including cell motility, subcellular organelle distribution, formation of membrane contact sites, microtubule dynamics, transcription, and protein degradation.

== See also ==
- FMN-binding fluorescent proteins
