= Fluffy transcription factor =

Mold gene required for asexual reproduction

Conidial development protein fluffy

Identifiers
- Organism: Neurospora crassa
- Symbol: fl
- Alt. symbols: NCU08726, acon
- Entrez: 3879750
- Orthologs: NCBI: entry; OMA: entry
- RefSeq (mRNA): XM_958494
- RefSeq (Prot): XP_963587
- UniProt: O13360

Other data
- Chromosome: II: 3.81 - 3.81 Mb
Search for
- Structures: Swiss-model
- Domains: InterPro

Fluffy (fl) is a gene found in Neurospora crassa, a type of red bread mold. It is required for asexual sporulation and encodes an 88 kDa polypeptide containing a typical fungal Zn2Cys6 DNA-binding motif.
