= One gene–one enzyme hypothesis =

Theory in genetics

The one gene–one enzyme hypothesis is the idea that genes act through the production of enzymes, with each gene responsible for producing a single enzyme that in turn affects a single step in a metabolic pathway. The concept was proposed by George Beadle and Edward Tatum in an influential 1941 paper on genetic mutations in the mold Neurospora crassa, and subsequently was dubbed the "one gene–one enzyme hypothesis" by their collaborator Norman Horowitz. In 2004, Horowitz reminisced that "these experiments founded the science of what Beadle and Tatum called 'biochemical genetics.' In actuality they proved to be the opening gun in what became molecular genetics and all the developments that have followed from that." The development of the one gene–one enzyme hypothesis is often considered the first significant result in what came to be called molecular biology. Although it has been extremely influential, the hypothesis was recognized soon after its proposal to be an oversimplification. Even the subsequent reformulation of the "one gene–one polypeptide" hypothesis is now considered too simple to describe the relationship between genes and proteins.

== Origin ==
Mention of Beadle and Tatum's 1958 Nobel prize on the monument at the American Museum of Natural History in New York City.

Although some instances of errors in metabolism following Mendelian inheritance patterns were known earlier, beginning with the 1902 identification by Archibald Garrod of alkaptonuria as a Mendelian recessive trait, for the most part genetics could not be applied to metabolism through the late 1930s. Another of the exceptions was the work of Boris Ephrussi and George Beadle, two geneticists working on the eye color pigments of Drosophila melanogaster fruit flies in the Caltech laboratory of Thomas Hunt Morgan. In the mid-1930s they found that genes affecting eye color appeared to be serially dependent, and that the normal red eyes of Drosophila were the result of pigments that went through a series of transformations; different eye color gene mutations disrupted the transformations at a different points in the series. Thus, Beadle reasoned that each gene was responsible for an enzyme acting in the metabolic pathway of pigment synthesis. However, because it was a relatively superficial pathway rather than one shared widely by diverse organisms, little was known about the biochemical details of fruit fly eye pigment metabolism. Studying that pathway in more detail required isolating pigments from the eyes of flies, an extremely tedious process.

After moving to Stanford University in 1937, Beadle began working with biochemist Edward Tatum to isolate the fly eye pigments. After some success with this approach—they identified one of the intermediate pigments shortly after another researcher, Adolf Butenandt, beat them to the discovery—Beadle and Tatum switched their focus to an organism that made genetic studies of biochemical traits much easier: the bread mold Neurospora crassa, which had recently been subjected to genetic research by one of Thomas Hunt Morgan's researchers, Carl C. Lingegren. Neurospora had several advantages: it required a simple growth medium, it grew quickly, and because of the production of ascospores during reproduction it was easy to isolate genetic mutants for analysis. They produced mutations by exposing the fungus to X-rays, and then identified strains that had metabolic defects by varying the growth medium. This work of Beadle and Tatum led almost at once to an important generalization. This was that most mutants unable to grow on minimal medium but able to grow on "complete" medium each require addition of only one particular supplement for growth on minimal medium. If the synthesis of a particular nutrient (such as an amino acid or vitamin) was disrupted by mutation, that mutant strain could be grown by adding the necessary nutrient to the medium. This finding suggested that most mutations affected only a single metabolic pathway. Further evidence obtained soon after the initial findings tended to show that generally only a single step in the pathway is blocked. Following their first report of three such auxotroph mutants in 1941, Beadle and Tatum used this method to create series of related mutants and determined the order in which amino acids and some other metabolites were synthesized in several metabolic pathways. The obvious inference from these experiments was that each gene mutation affects the activity of a single enzyme. This led directly to the one gene–one enzyme hypothesis, which, with certain qualifications and refinements, has remained essentially valid to the present day. As recalled by Horowitz et al., the work of Beadle and Tatum also demonstrated that genes have an essential role in biosyntheses. At the time of the experiments (1941), non-geneticists still generally believed that genes governed only trivial biological traits, such as eye color, and bristle arrangement in fruit flies, while basic biochemistry was determined in the cytoplasm by unknown processes. Also, many respected geneticists thought that gene action was far too complicated to be resolved by any simple experiment. Thus Beadle and Tatum brought about a fundamental revolution in our understanding of genetics, for which they were awarded a Nobel Prize in Physiology or Medicine in 1958.

The nutritional mutants of Neurospora also proved to have practical applications; in one of the early, if indirect, examples of military funding of science in the biological sciences, Beadle garnered additional research funding (from the Rockefeller Foundation and an association of manufacturers of military rations) to develop strains that could be used to assay the nutrient content of foodstuffs, to ensure adequate nutrition for troops in World War II.

== The hypothesis and alternative interpretations ==
In their first Neurospora paper, published in the November 15, 1941, edition of the Proceedings of the National Academy of Sciences, Beadle and Tatum noted that it was "entirely tenable to suppose that these genes which are themselves a part of the system, control or regulate specific reactions in the system either by acting directly as enzymes or by determining the specificities of enzymes", an idea that had been suggested, though with limited experimental support, as early as 1917; they offered new evidence to support that view, and outlined a research program that would enable it to be explored more fully. By 1945, Beadle, Tatum and others, working with Neurospora and other model organisms such as E. coli, had produced considerable experimental evidence that each step in a metabolic pathway is controlled by a single gene. In a 1945 review, Beadle suggested that "the gene can be visualized as directing the final configuration of a protein molecule and thus determining its specificity." He also argued that "for reasons of economy in the evolutionary process, one might expect that with few exceptions the final specificity of a particular enzyme would be imposed by only one gene." At the time, genes were widely thought to consist of proteins or nucleoproteins (although the Avery–MacLeod–McCarty experiment and related work was beginning to cast doubt on that idea). However, the proposed connection between a single gene and a single protein enzyme outlived the protein theory of gene structure. In a 1948 paper, Norman Horowitz named the concept the "one gene–one enzyme hypothesis".

Although influential, the one gene–one enzyme hypothesis was not unchallenged. Among others, Max Delbrück was skeptical only a single enzyme was actually involved at each step along metabolic pathways. For many who did accept the results, it strengthened the link between genes and enzymes, so that some biochemists thought that genes were enzymes; this was consistent with other work, such as studies of the reproduction of tobacco mosaic virus (which was known to have heritable variations and which followed the same pattern of autocatalysis as many enzymatic reactions) and the crystallization of that virus as an apparently pure protein. At the start of the 1950s, the Neurospora findings were widely admired, but the prevailing view in 1951 was that the conclusion Beadle had drawn from them was a vast oversimplification. Beadle wrote in 1966, that after reading the 1951 Cold Spring Harbor Symposium on Genes and Mutations, he had the impression that supporters of the one gene–one enzyme hypothesis "could be counted on the fingers of one hand with a couple of fingers left over." By the early 1950s, most biochemists and geneticists considered DNA the most likely candidate for physical basis of the gene, and the one gene–one enzyme hypothesis was reinterpreted accordingly.

=== One gene–one polypeptide ===
In attributing an instructional role to genes, Beadle and Tatum implicitly accorded genes an informational capability. This insight provided the foundation for the concept of a genetic code. However, it was not until the experiments were performed showing that DNA was the genetic material, that proteins consist of a defined linear sequence of amino acids, and that DNA structure contained a linear sequence of base pairs, was there a clear basis for solving the genetic code.

By the early 1950s, advances in biochemical genetics—spurred in part by the original hypothesis—made the one gene–one enzyme hypothesis seem very unlikely (at least in its original form). Beginning in 1957, Vernon Ingram and others showed through electrophoresis and 2D chromatography that genetic variations in proteins (such as sickle cell hemoglobin) could be limited to differences in just a single polypeptide chain in a multimeric protein, leading to a "one gene–one polypeptide" hypothesis instead. According to geneticist Rowland H. Davis, "By 1958 – indeed, even by 1948 – one gene, one enzyme was no longer a hypothesis to be resolutely defended; it was simply the name of a research program."

Presently, the one gene–one polypeptide perspective cannot account for the various spliced versions in many eukaryote organisms which use a spliceosome to individually prepare a RNA transcript depending on the various inter- and intra-cellular environmental signals. This splicing was discovered in 1977 by Phillip Sharp and Richard J. Roberts

== Possible anticipation of Beadle and Tatum's results ==
Historian Jan Sapp has studied the controversy in regard to German geneticist Franz Moewus who, as some leading geneticists of the 1940s and 50s argued, generated similar results before Beadle and Tatum's celebrated 1941 work. Working on the algae Chlamydomonas, Moewus published, in the 1930s, results that showed that different genes were responsible for different enzymatic reactions in the production of hormones that controlled the organism's reproduction. However, as Sapp skillfully details, those results were challenged by others who found the data 'too good to be true' statistically, and the results could not be replicated.

== See also ==
- Edward Lawrie Tatum
- George Wells Beadle
- Neurospora crassa
- Norman Horowitz (geneticist)
- Central dogma of molecular biology
