= Fungal Genetics Stock Center =

US institute for research into fungi

Established in 1960, the Fungal Genetics Stock Center is the main open repository for genetically characterized fungi. The FGSC is a member of the World Federation for Culture Collections and is a leading collection in the US Culture Collection Network Research Coordination Network .

== Holdings ==
The FGSC distributes strains of Neurospora and Aspergillus, as well as limited numbers of Fusarium, Magnaporthe and many strains from current fungal genome projects.

In the 1980s and 1990s the FGSC added molecular materials including cloned genes, cloning vectors and gene libraries to the collection.

As more fungal genomes have been sequenced, the FGSC has re-evaluated the definition of a genetic system. This has led them to expand the collection, with additional materials including strains from genome programs and mutant collections for organisms such as Neurospora crassa, Aspergillus nidulans, Cryptococcus neoformans, and Candida albicans.

As a genetic repository, the FGSC has always endeavored to represent the diversity of genetic materials available. To that end, they hold large numbers of strains of a few different species. More specifically, strains from 76 different species representing 23 different genera. Of these, there are more than ten strains for only nineteen different species. These strains have been deposited by 310 different individuals, 64 of whom have deposited only one strain. The FGSC also holds a number of non-accessioned strains including the wild-type strain collection of Dr. David Perkins as well as Neurospora strains from a number of other researchers who have retired. These are held with the understanding that they will keep them as long as space is available. They are not curated and are available on an as-is basis. Other strain collections include Allomyces (pdf), Aspergillus niger, Ustilago madis, and Neurospora strains from the historical Tatum lab collection

== Distribution ==
In the period from January 1998 to December 2018, the FGSC distributed over 630,000 cultures including nearly 5,000 individual mutants and over 20,000 gene deletion mutants arrayed in 96-well format. Since the development of the FGSC database in 1987, the FGSC has sent out over 650,000 strains.

== History ==
The FGSC was founded in 1960 at Dartmouth College with a grant from the US National Science Foundation. Dr. R. Barratt was the first Director of the FGSC. The FGSC has moved three times since then and has been housed at Humboldt State University, the University of Kansas Medical Center the University of Missouri–Kansas City, and since 2014, Kansas State University . At KU Med Center Dr. J. Kinsey was director and he worked on genetics of amino acid metabolism and later identified the transposon "Tad" in a Neurospora crassa strain from Adiopodoume, Ivory Coast. At UMKC, Dr. Michael Plamann who worked on cytoskeleton dynamics was the director. Since 2014, Dr. John Leslie of the Kansas State University Department of Plant Pathology has been Director.

The FGSC has had three curators since it was established. William (Bill) Ogata was the first curator, serving until he retired in 1981. He was succeeded by Craig Wilson at Humboldt. Mr. Wilson moved with the collection to Kansas City where in 1995 Dr. Kevin McCluskey became the curator. Since 1995 the FGSC holdings grew from 8,000 strains to well over 25,000 strains. Similarly, best practice guides for culture collections became available and were integrated into the FGSC practices.

== Support ==
For many years the FGSC was supported by the US National Science Foundation under their Living Stock Collection program. Beginning in 2015, the FGSC has been supported by the Kansas State University College of Agriculture and by fees paid by clients.

== Additional services ==
One of the main goals of the FGSC is to make research with filamentous fungi (mold) more accessible. To that end the FGSC web-site hosts extensive protocols for Neurospora and Aspergillus. Other materials and services are available on a case-by-case basis.

== Research ==
Most research activities at the FGSC are aimed at adding value to the materials in the collection. Specific projects have included strain improvement, identification of unknown markers and production of multiply marked strains. Recent work includes the characterization of otherwise anonymous temperature sensitive mutations in Neurospora and characterization of otherwise anonymous classical mutants in collaboration with the US Department of Energy JGI.

The FGSC was a part of the Neurospora Functional Genomics program. and accessioned over 13,000 gene deletion mutants together comprising a whole genome deletion set between 2006 and 2014.
