= Franz Moewus =

Franz Moewus (died May 30, 1959) was a German biologist who studied the algae Chlamydomonas, one species of which is named for him (Chlamydomonas moewusii). His work was later called into question due to other scientists being unable to reproduce his results.
