= Frequency (gene) =

Frequency clock protein

Identifiers
- Symbol: FRQ
- Pfam: PF09421
- InterPro: IPR018554
Available protein structures:
- PDB: IPR018554 PF09421 (ECOD; PDBsum)
- AlphaFold: IPR018554; PF09421

The frequency (frq) gene encodes the protein frequency (FRQ) that functions in the Neurospora crassa circadian clock. The FRQ protein plays a key role in circadian oscillator, serving to nucleate the negative element complex in the auto regulatory transcription-translation negative feedback-loop (TTFL) that is responsible for circadian rhythms in N. crassa. Similar rhythms are found in mammals, Drosophila and cyanobacteria. Recently, FRQ homologs have been identified in several other species of fungi. Expression of frq is controlled by the two transcription factors white collar-1 (WC-1) and white collar-2 (WC-2) that act together as the White Collar Complex (WCC) and serve as the positive element in the TTFL. Expression of frq can also be induced through light exposure in a WCC dependent manner. Forward genetics has generated many alleles of frq resulting in strains whose circadian clocks vary in period length.

== Discovery ==
The frq locus was discovered by Jerry F. Feldman. Feldman had been a graduate student with Colin Pittendrigh at Princeton and went to Caltech in 1967 to begin genetic screens for circadian clock mutants. The screening was aided by recent work that improved the expression of the rhythm in Neurospora. Colin Pittendrigh and his colleagues had confirmed in 1959 that the daily cycle of asexual development, described in Neurospora crassa earlier by Brandt, was in fact due to regulation by a circadian clock. In work published not long before Feldman arrived at Caltech, Malcolm L. Sargent, Winslow R. Briggs and Dow O. Woodward at Stanford University reported that overt expression of the developmental rhythm in conidiation was enhanced in a strain of Neurospora called Timex. (This strain contained a mutation in the locus band (bd), later shown to encode a mildly hyperactive allele of ras-1 so strains are now known as ras-1[bd]. Because rhythms in strains that include ras-1[bd] are easier to detect, ras-1[bd] is often incorporated into strains used for studies of circadian biology in Neurospora.). Outputs of the Neurospora circadian clock include carotenoid synthesis as well as the asexual spore formation seen on race tubes, and recent evidence suggests that thousands of genes are under circadian control.

Feldman used nitrosoguanidine as a mutagen and used race tubes to screen individual strains surviving the mutagenesis for their circadian period length. Race tubes are long hollow glass tubes bent at either end to hold an agar growth medium. When Neurospora is inoculated at one end of a tube it will grow to the other end, and in constant darkness the daily circadian cycle of growth and development is manifest. Although Feldman's screens were successful he was slow to publish so the identity of mutant genes frq[1], frq[2], and frq[3] were not reported until 1973. In 1986, frq was cloned by Jay Dunlap and his colleagues using a strategy that involved a long chromosome walk and successful application of the then-untried strategy of rescuing an arrhythmic behavioral mutant through transformation of exogenous DNA arising from the chromosome walk. The success of this strategy and of the cloning of a clock gene sparked interest in further research and understanding of the N. crassa circadian clock. The expression of frq was later shown to rhythmically cycle; furthermore, when strains of Neurospora were engineered in which frq expression could be driven from a region distinct from the resident wild type gene, it was found that FRQ repressed its own expression and that no level of constant expression could support a circadian clock. These experiments were the first to manipulate the expression of a clock gene through means that did not themselves affect the clock and established that autoregulatory negative feedback giving rise to cyclical clock gene expression lay at the core of the circadian oscillator.

== Structure and function ==
Simplified Representation of Neurospora Circadian Clock

Reflecting its role as a core clock protein, deletion of the frq gene results in arrhythmicity, and in Neurospora, the only function of FRQ is in the circadian clock. The frq gene can be activated from two distinct cis-acting sequences in its promoter, a distal site, the clock-box, used in the context of circadian regulation, and a site close to the principal transcription start site that is used for light-induced expression (the proximal light-regulatory element or PLRE). These frq transcripts both have capacity to encode two FRQ proteins, a long form of 989 amino acids (lFRQ) and a short form of 890 amino acids (sFRQ); both lFRQ and sFRQ are required for strong rhythmicity although the clock is able to persist at certain temperatures, albeit with a weaker rhythmicity, with just one of the proteins present. The choice of which protein is made is the result of temperature-dependent splicing of the primary transcript such that it includes or excludes the ATG start codon for lFRQ. The two forms of FRQ provide the Neurospora clock a greater range of temperatures over which it can operate optimally. An increase in temperature leads to increased expression of lFRQ, while sFRQ is unaffected. Warmer temperatures induce more efficient splicing of an intron in the translation start site. Because sFRQ favors a longer period than lFRQ, free running rhythms in wild type Neurospora are somewhat decreased with increased temperature.

FRQ has also been shown to interact with several other proteins. It interacts at all times with FRH (FRQ-interacting RNA helicase; an essential DEAD box-containing RNA helicase in Neurospora) to form a FRQ/FRH complex (FFC). FRQ also stably interacts with casein kinase 1 (CK1) although the strength of the interaction changes with time of day. Additional interactions with other kinases including PRD-4 (CHK2) and casein kinase 2 (CKII) are known.

Structural prediction programs suggest that only a few regions of FRQ are likely to fold into stable structures, and consistent with this a variety of experimental data indicate that FRQ is an intrinsically disordered protein. In the absence of its partner FRH, FRQ is very unstable. The myriad time-of-day specific phosphorylation that characterize FRQ are predicted to provide structure to this otherwise disordered protein. There is no known domain structure to FRQ because of its highly disordered structure.

Typically, proteins show a codon usage bias where they are more likely to choose synonymous codons that are more available in their tRNA pool. Neurospora crassa has a relatively strong codon usage bias compared to S. cerevisiae, a commonly used organism for codon-optimization analysis. However, because FRQ is an intrinsically disordered protein, it does not have demonstrate codon usage bias. In fact, when its codons are optimized, the protein loses its function and the clock is disturbed. This is not the case for cyanobacterial clock genes, kaiB and kaiC, which both led to more robust clock function.

== Regulation ==
Relative peaks of frq mRNA, FRQ protein and WC-1 protein. Demonstrates how WC-1 activates subsequent transcription of frq.

A description of the regulation of frq and FRQ requires a description of the clock cycle. The molecular basis of the circadian oscillator in Neurospora begins with two protein complexes. One is the FFC, the negative element complex composed of two copies of FRQ, FRH, and Casein kinase 1 as well as, probably, other less strongly bound proteins. The other complex which acts as the positive element in the feedback loop includes WC-1 and WC-2; they are GATA transcription factors that, together, form the heterodimeric WCC via their PAS domains. When WCC is released from the FFC negative element complex during subjective night, it binds to the clock-box within frequency (frq) gene promoter and activates frq transcription. It has recently been shown that the Histone H3 Lysine 36 Methyltransferase, SET-2, is responsible for methylation of the frq gene to establish a chromatin state that will allow for transcription of frq by the WCC.

The frequency (FRQ) protein accumulates and is progressively phosphorylated by CKI, CKII, and a calcium/calmodulin-dependent kinase (CAMK-1), and additional kinases, reaching its peak around mid-subjective day. Kinase inhibitors reduce degradation of FRQ by preventing phosphorylation. FRQ is phosphorylated at more than 100 sites based on in vitro analyses using mass spectrometry of lFRQ peptides. These sites appear within the protein in a highly reproducible manner indicating that the timing of the phosphorylations is important. Moreover, mutation of the sites shows that they work in domains, with some phosphorylations serving to lengthen period and others to shorten period.

FRQ recruits kinases such as casein kinase 1a (CK-1a) that phosphorylate WCC, although the function of these phosphorylations is unclear as hyperphosphorylated WCC remains active. Eventually, repression is relieved when FRQ becomes so highly phosphorylated that the FFC no longer interacts with the WCC. This process occurs with a periodicity of around 22 hours in constant conditions. At a later time, and with kinetics that do not influence the circadian cycle, this hyperphosphorylated FRQ is degraded through the ubiquitin/proteasome pathway. Heavily phosphorylated FRQ undergoes a conformational change that is detected by the FWD-1 protein, which is part of the SCF type E3 ligase.

FRQ forms a homodimer via its coiled-coil domain located near the N-terminus. This dimerization is required for FRQ to interact with the WCC and repress its own expression. Deletion of the WCC leads to an inability to form the homodimer, which causes frq to no longer be negatively regulated by FRQ concentration. This leads to arrhythmicity.

A positive feedback loop between FRQ and WCC has been proposed but details are not yet known. It is believed that WCC is degraded when it is transcriptionally active, and that prevention of this caused by the FFC allows for an accumulation of WCC. This proposed mechanism has been shown to possibly be more complex in that FRQ may regulate WC-1 and WC-2 independently. Recently the transcription factor ADV-1 was identified as a necessary transducer of clock outputs, including circadian rhythmicity in genes critical to somatic cell fusion.

The frq gene is strongly induced by short duration exposure to light. Because the core of the clock is based on rhythmic expression of frq, acute light-induction provides a straightforward way to reset the clock. Mammalian clocks are reset by light by a nearly identical mechanism, with mPer1 transcripts being induced by short flashes of light outside of the subjective day. The mPer1 mechanism in the mammalian clock draws closer similarities to the mechanism in Neurospora than to the mechanism of its homolog in Drosophila, per.

== Mutations ==
Forward genetics has been used to create Neurospora clock mutants with varied periods of conidiation. Although nine alleles have been described as having come from forward genetics, sequence analysis subsequent to the cloning of frq showed that frq[2] ,frq[4], and frq[6] shared the same single base change, and likewise frq[7] and frq[8] had the same single base change, so the redundant alleles have been dropped. The periods of various frq mutants that arose from forward screens are as follows when measured at 25 °C, although because frq[3] and frq[7] result in clocks with altered temperature compensation, periods will be different at other temperatures:

Neurospora crassa, organism used to study the FRQ/WCC oscillator

Period of frq mutants at 25˚C
Mutant	frq[1]	frq[2]	frq[3	frq[7]	frq[9]
Period (hr)	16.5	19.3	24.0	29.0	Arrhythmic

== FRQ-less oscillator (FLO) ==
A number of identifiably distinct oscillators outside of the FRQ/WCC system have been discovered; however, none of these FRQ-less oscillations (FLOs) satisfy the characteristics to be classified as circadian oscillators. The circadian FRQ-WCC Oscillator (FWO) has been shown, via luciferase reporting, to continue running even when a FLO (the CDO or choline deficiency oscillator that controls conidiation under conditions of choline limitation) controls conidiation. In the frq[9] mutant Neurospora crassa, a non-temperature compensated rhythm of conidiospore development was still observed in constant darkness (DD). The period for frq null mutants varied from 12 to 35 hours but could be stabilized by the addition of farnesol or geraniol. However, this mechanism is not well understood. Although this FRQ-less rhythm lost certain clock characteristics such as temperature compensation, temperature pulses were sufficient to reset the clock. Another FLO is the NRO or Nitrate Reductase Oscillator that appears under conditions of nitrate starvation and is thought to arise from feedback loops within the nitrate assimilation pathway; it has a period length of about 24 hours but is not temperature compensated. In short, there is much evidence to support FRQ-less oscillators in Neurospora crassa. One way to rationalize this is to assume that many are "slaves" to the frequency/white collar oscillator; they do not possess all of the characteristics of a circadian clock on their own because this is supplied by the FWO. However, rhythms in clock-controlled gene-16 (ccg-16) are coupled to the FWO but function autonomously, demonstrating that Neurospora crassa contains at least 2 potential pacemakers, but only one that can be reset by light and temperature while maintaining temperature compensation. The FRQ-less oscillator has never been proven to affect the true circadian clock. The mechanism and significance for FRQ-less oscillators (FLO) are still under research.

== Evolution ==
The FRQ protein is conserved within the Sordariacea but diverges outside of this group. Nonetheless, bona fide FRQ-based circadian cocks have been found in organisms other than Neurospora both within the Sordariacea, for instance, in the salient fungal pathogen Botrytis, and also as far afield as Pyronema within the Pezizomycetes, an early-diverging lineage of filamentous ascomycetes. Frq was even found in non-Dikarya group of fungi. The finding of frq and conserved circadian clock mechanism inside non-Dikarya, Arbuscular Mycorrhizal Fungi expanded the evolutionary history of this gene in Fungal kingdom. frq seems to diverge very quickly during its evolution. A part of the reason why the FRQ primary amino acid sequence diverges so quickly may be because it is an intrinsically disordered protein and as a result lacks the structural constraints that limit sequence changes. Since codon optimization of the frq gene results in impaired circadian feedback loop function, frq displays non-optimal codon usage bias across its open reading frame in contrast to most other genes. FRQ is an intrinsically disordered protein that is not well conserved, even across fungi. Unlike FRQ, however, WC-1 is very well conserved. It is the founding member of the family of blue light photoreceptors used in the entire Kingdom of fungi. Moreover, it is similar in structure and function to BMAL1. Casein kinase 2 is conserved in the circadian oscillators of plants (Arabidopsis) and flies (Drosophila). A similar form of CKI is necessary for the degradation of period (PER) proteins in Drosophila and mammals. The Drosophila gene slimb is orthologous to FWD1 in Neurospora, both of which are crucial for clock protein degradation. In general, the TTFLs found in fungi and animals share a similar regulatory architecture, with a single step negative feedback loop, PAS-PAS heterodimeric activators that are conserved, and negative element proteins that largely lack structure and are much less well conserved. A similar palette of kinases modifies the clock proteins in all cases.

== See also ==
- Negative feedback
- White Collar-1
