= PAS domain =

Protein domain

PAS fold
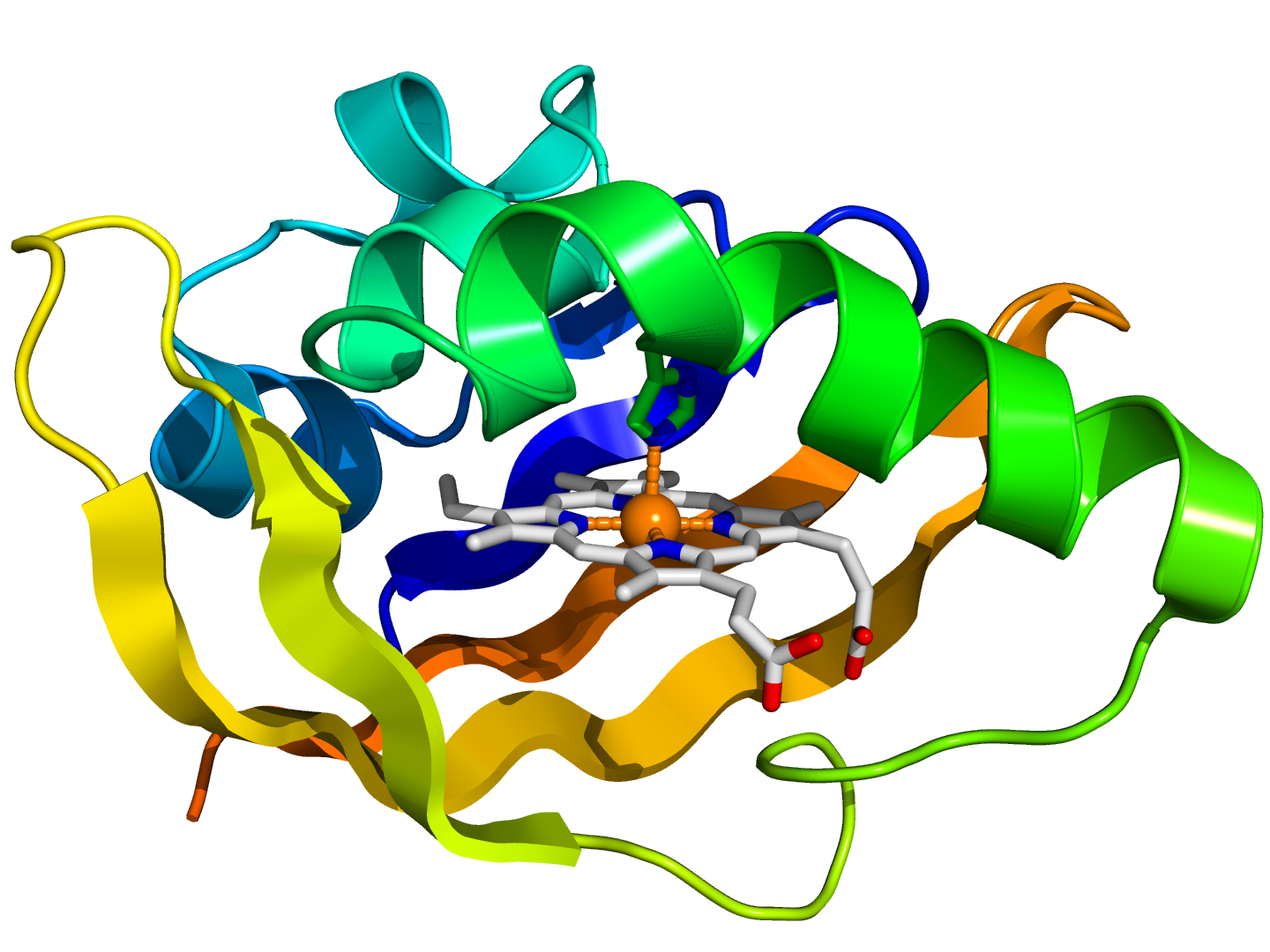
- Crystallographic structure of the PAS domain of the bacterial oxygen sensor protein fixL. The protein is depicted as a rainbow colored cartoon (N-terminus = blue, C-terminus = red) while the heme ligand is shown as sticks (carbon = white, nitrogen = blue, oxygen = red, iron = orange).

Identifiers
- Symbol: PAS
- Pfam: PF00989
- Pfam clan: CL0183
- ECOD: 223.1.1
- InterPro: IPR013767
- SMART: PAS
- PROSITE: PDOC50112
- SCOP2: 2phy / SCOPe / SUPFAM
- CDD: cd00130
Available protein structures:
- PDB: 1byw, 1d06, 1d7e, 1dp6, 1dp8, 1dp9, 1drm, 1ew0, 1f98, 1f9i, 1gsv, 1gsw, 1gsx, 1kou, 1ll8, 1lsv, 1lsw, 1lsx, 1lt0, 1mzu, 1nwz, 1odv, 1ot6, 1ot9, 1ota, 1otb, 1otd, 1ote, 1oti, 1s1y, 1s1z, 1s4r, 1s4s, 1s66, 1s67, 1t18, 1t19, 1t1a, 1t1b, 1t1c, 1ts0, 1ts6, 1ts7, 1ts8, 1ugu, 1uwn, 1uwp, 1v9y, 1v9z, 1vb6, 1wa9, 1xfn, 1xfq, 1xj2, 1xj3, 1xj4, 1xj6, 1y28, 2d01, 2d02, 2phy, 2pyp, 2pyr, 3phy, 3pyp IPR013767 PF00989 (ECOD; PDBsum)
- AlphaFold: IPR013767; PF00989

A Per-Arnt-Sim (PAS) domain is a protein domain found in all kingdoms of life. Generally, the PAS domain acts as a molecular sensor, whereby small molecules and other proteins associate via binding of the PAS domain. Due to this sensing capability, the PAS domain has been shown as the key structural motif involved in protein-protein interactions of the circadian clock, and it is also a common motif found in signaling proteins, where it functions as a signaling sensor.

== Discovery ==
PAS domains are found in a large number of organisms from bacteria to mammals. The PAS domain was named after the three proteins in which it was first discovered:

- Per – period circadian protein
- Arnt – aryl hydrocarbon receptor nuclear translocator protein
- Sim – single-minded protein

Since the initial discovery of the PAS domain, a large quantity of PAS domain binding sites have been discovered in bacteria and eukaryotes. A subset called PAS LOV proteins are responsive to oxygen, light and voltage.

== Structure ==
Although the PAS domain exhibits a degree of sequence variability, the three-dimensional structure of the PAS domain core is broadly conserved. This core consists of a five-stranded antiparallel β-sheet and several α-helices. Structural changes, as a result of signaling, predominantly originate within the β-sheet. These signals propagate via the α-helices of the core to the covalently-attached effector domain. In 1998, the PAS domain core architecture was first characterized in the structure of photoactive yellow protein (PYP) from Halorhodospira halophila. In many proteins, a dimer of PAS domains is required, whereby one binds a ligand and the other mediates interactions with other proteins.

== Examples of PAS in organisms ==
The PAS domains that are known share less than 20% average pairwise sequence identity, meaning they are surprisingly dissimilar. PAS domains are frequently found on proteins with other environmental sensing mechanisms. Also, many PAS domains are attached to photoreceptive cells.

=== Bacteria ===
Often in the bacterial kingdom, PAS domains are positioned at the amino terminus of signaling proteins such as sensor histidine kinases, cyclic-di-GMP syntheses and hydrolases, and methyl-accepting chemotaxis proteins.

=== Neurospora ===
In the presence of light, White Collar-1 (WC-1) and White Collar-2 (WC-2) dimerizes via mediation by the PAS domains, which activates translation of FRQ.

=== Drosophila ===
In the presence of light, CLK and CYC attach via a PAS domain, activating the translation of PER, which then associates to Tim via the PER PAS domain. The following genes contain PAS binding domains: PER, Tim, CLK, CYC.

=== Arabidopsis ===
A PAS domain is found in the ZTL and NPH1 genes. These domains are very similar to the PAS domain found in the Neurospora circadian-associated protein WC-1.

=== Mammals ===
The circadian clock that is currently understood for mammals begins when light activates BMAL1 and CLK to bind via their PAS domains. That activator complex regulates Per1, Per2, and Per3 which all have PAS domains that are used to bind to cryptochromes 1 and 2 (CRY 1,2 family). The following mammalian genes contain PAS binding domains: Per1, Per2, Per3, Cry1, Cry2, Bmal, Clk, Pasd1.

==== Other mammalian PAS roles ====
Within Mammals, both PAS domains play important roles. PAS A is responsible for the protein-protein interactions with other PAS domain proteins, while PAS B has a more versatile role. It mediates interactions with chaperonins and other small molecules like dioxin, but PAS B domains in NPAS2, a homolog of the Drosophila clk gene, and the hypoxia inducible factor (HIF) also help to mediate ligand binding. Furthermore, PAS domains containing the NPAS2 protein have been shown to be a substitute for the Clock gene in mutant mice who lack the Clock gene completely.

The PAS domain also directly interacts with BHLH. It is typically located on the C-terminus of the BHLH protein. PAS domains containing BHLH proteins form a BHLH-Pas protein, typically found and encoded in HIF, which require both the PAS domain and BHLH domain and the Clock gene.

== Related sensor domains ==
=== GAF domain ===
GAF domain

Identifiers
- Symbol: GAF
- Pfam clan: CL0161
- ECOD: 223.1.1

These cGMP-binding domains are found in diverse phototransducing proteins across eukaryotes and eubacteria. They are present in plant and cyanobacterial phytochromes, vertebrate and invertebrate cGMP-stimulated phosphodiesterases (PDEs) and some non-photosynthetic eubacteria.

=== Cache domain ===
Cache domain

Identifiers
- Symbol: Cache
- Pfam clan: CL0165
- ECOD: 223.1.1

These extracellular signaling domains are homologous to PAS domains but distinct. They are common to animal calcium (Ca^{2+}) channel subunits and certain prokaryotic chemotaxis receptors and play a role in small-molecule recognition across various species, suggesting a conserved mechanism of ligand binding. As opposite to the intracellular PAS and GAF domains, they show a long extra N-terminal alpha helix.

== Other sensor domains ==
=== Hpt domain ===
Hpt domain

Identifiers
- Symbol: Hpt
- Pfam: PF01627
- ECOD: 601.3.1
- InterPro: IPR036641
Available protein structures:
- PDB: IPR036641 PF01627 (ECOD; PDBsum)
- AlphaFold: IPR036641; PF01627

Also known as histidine phosphotransfer domains and histidine phosphotransferases, these domains are protein domains involved in the "phosphorelay" form of two-component regulatory systems.

=== HAMP domain ===
HAMP

Identifiers
- Symbol: HAMP
- Pfam: PF00672
- Pfam clan: CL0681
- ECOD: 4168.1.1
- InterPro: IPR003660
Available protein structures:
- PDB: IPR003660 PF00672 (ECOD; PDBsum)
- AlphaFold: IPR003660; PF00672

The HAMP domain (present in histidine kinases, adenylate cyclases, methyl accepting proteins, and phosphatases) is an approximately 50-amino acid alpha-helical region that forms a dimeric, four-helical coiled coil.
