= Edward Tatum =

American geneticist (1909–1975)

- Born: Edward Lawrie Tatum; December 14, 1909; Boulder, Colorado, U.S.
- Died: November 5, 1975 (aged 65); New York City, U.S.
- Education: University of Chicago; University of Wisconsin–Madison
- Known for: Gene regulation of biochemical events within cells
- Awards: Nobel Prize in Physiology or Medicine
- Scientific career
- Fields: Genetics
- Workplaces: Stanford University; Yale University; Rockefeller Institute
- Doctoral students: Joshua Lederberg; Carolyn Slayman
- Other notable students: Esther M. Lederberg

Edward Lawrie Tatum (December 14, 1909 – November 5, 1975) was an American geneticist. He shared half of the Nobel Prize in Physiology or Medicine in 1958 with George Beadle for showing that genes control individual steps in metabolism. The other half of that year's award went to Joshua Lederberg. Tatum was an elected member of the United States National Academy of Sciences, the American Philosophical Society, and the American Academy of Arts and Sciences.

== Education ==
Edward Lawrie Tatum was born on December 14, 1909, in Boulder, Colorado to Arthur L. Tatum and Mabel Webb Tatum. Arthur L. Tatum was a chemistry professor, who by 1925 was a professor of pharmacology at the University of Wisconsin at Madison.

Edward Lawrie Tatum attended college at the University of Chicago for two years, before transferring to the University of Wisconsin–Madison, where he received his BA in 1931 and PhD in 1934. His dissertation was Studies in the biochemistry of microorganisms (1934).

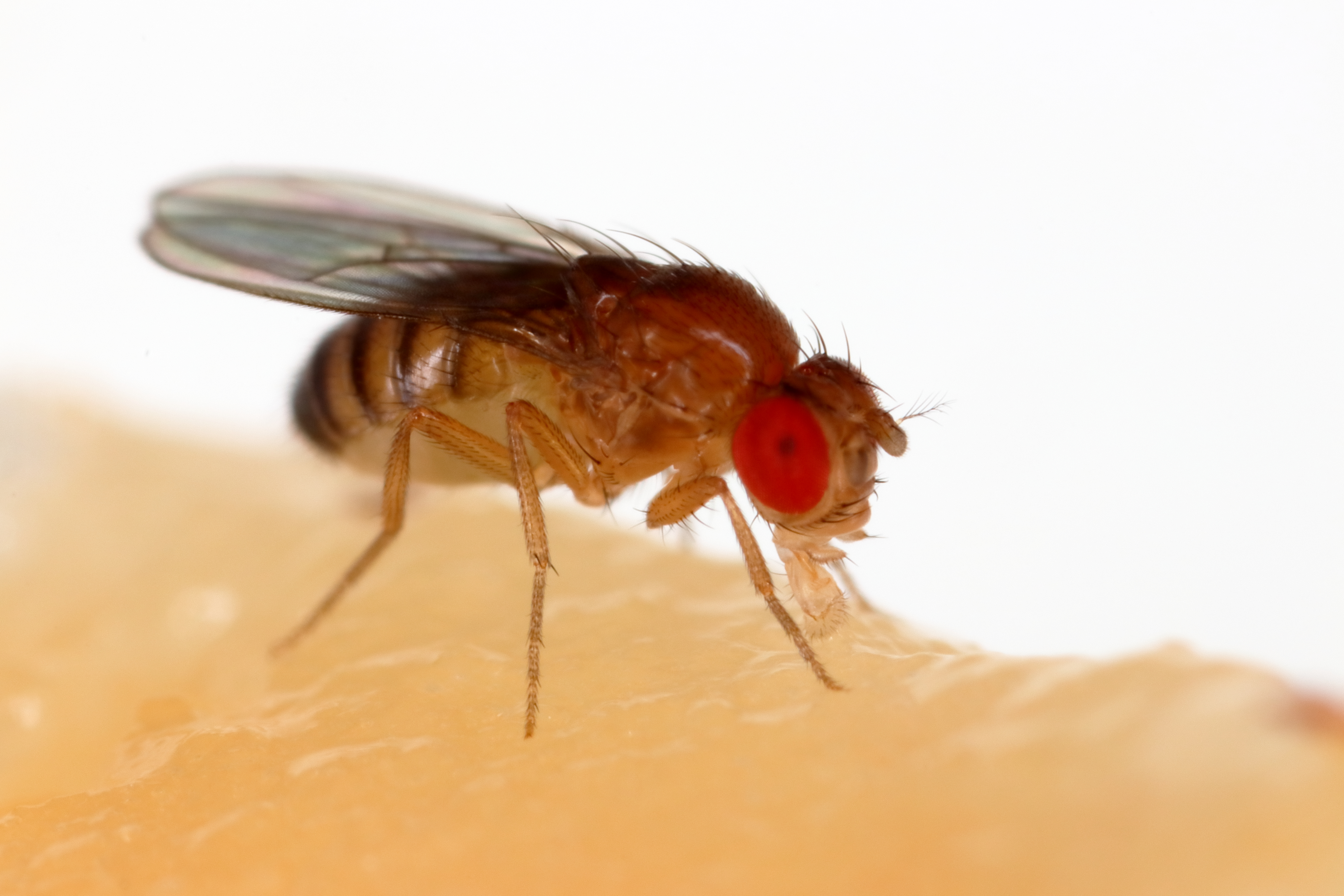
Drosophila Melanogaster, the object of Tatum's early science

== Career ==
Starting in 1937, Tatum worked at Stanford University, where he began collaborating with George Beadle on their work on fruit flies (Drosophila melanogaster). He then moved to Yale University in 1945 where he mentored Lederberg. He returned to Stanford in 1948 and then joined the faculty of Rockefeller Institute in 1957. He remained there until his death on November 5, 1975, in New York City. A heavy cigarette smoker, Tatum died of heart failure complicated by chronic emphysema. His last wife Elsie Bergland died in 1998.

== Research ==
Tatum and Beadle carried out pioneering studies of biochemical mutations in Neurospora, published in 1941. Their work provided a prototype of the investigation of gene action and a new and effective experimental methodology for the analysis of mutations in biochemical pathways. Beadle and Tatum's key experiments involved exposing the bread mold Neurospora crassa to x-rays, causing mutations. In a series of experiments, they showed that these mutations caused changes in specific enzymes involved in metabolic pathways. This led them to propose a direct link between genes and enzymatic reactions, known as the "one gene, one enzyme" hypothesis.

Tatum spent his career studying biosynthetic pathways and the genetics of bacteria. An active area of research in his laboratory was to understand the basis of Tryptophan biosynthesis in Escherichia coli. Tatum and his student Joshua Lederberg showed that E. coli could share genetic information through recombination.

== Awards and honors ==
- 1959, Member, American Academy of Arts and Sciences.
- 1958, Nobel Prize in Physiology or Medicine (with George Beadle and Joshua Lederberg) for showing that genes control individual steps in metabolism.
- 1957, Member, American Philosophical Society,
- 1952, Member, United States National Academy of Sciences,
