= Conidiation =

Fungal reproductive process

Conidiation is a biological process in which filamentous fungi reproduce asexually from spores. Rhythmic conidiation is the most obvious output of fungal circadian rhythms. Neurospora species are most often used to study this rhythmic conidiation. Physical stimuli, such as light exposure and mechanical injury to the mycelium trigger conidiation; however, conidiogenesis itself is a holistic response determined by the cell's metabolic state, as influenced by the environment and endogenous biological rhythms.

== See also ==
- Conidium
