= Phototropin =

Class of photoreceptor proteins in plants

Phototropins are blue light photoreceptor proteins (more specifically, flavoproteins) that mediate phototropism responses across many species of algae, fungi and higher plants. Phototropins can be found throughout the leaves of a plant. Along with cryptochromes and phytochromes they allow plants to respond and alter their growth in response to the light environment. When phototropins are hit with blue light, they induce a signal transduction pathway that alters the plant cells' functions in different ways.

Phototropins are part of the phototropic sensory system in plants that causes various environmental responses in plants. Phototropins specifically will cause stems to bend towards light and stomata to open. In addition phototropins mediate the first changes in stem elongation in blue light prior to cryptochrome activation. Phototropins are also required for blue light mediated transcript destabilization of specific mRNAs in the cell.

Phototropins also regulate the movement of chloroplasts within the cell, notably chloroplast avoidance. It was thought that this avoidance serves a protective function to avoid damage from intense light, however an alternate study argues that the avoidance response is primarily to increase light penetration into deeper mesophyll layers in high light conditions. Phototropins may also be important for the opening of stomata.

In green algae, Phototropins have been shown to be involved in process such as photoprotection, starch metabolism and phototactic behavior. Even though some of the processes the algal phototropins affect are similar to those in plants, the mode of action differs in the different types of organisms. In general, light activation of algal photoropins cause major transcriptional changes of target genes, which is not the case in plants.

== Enzyme activity ==
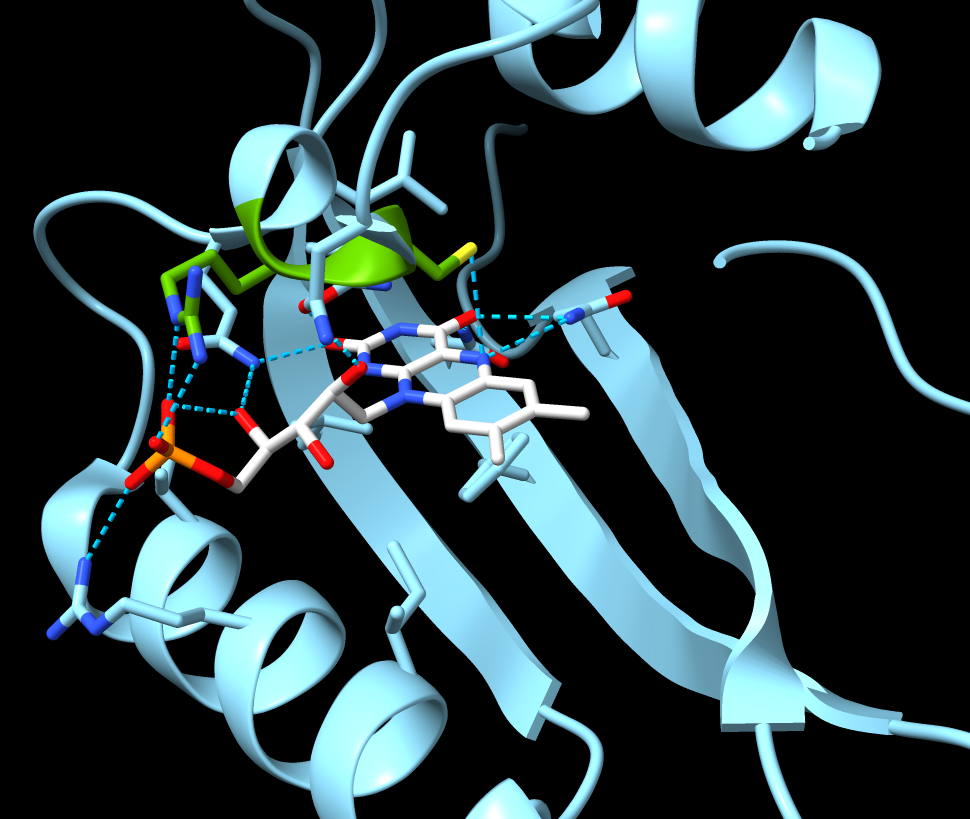
The crystal structure of the LOV2 domain of Phototropin-2 of Arabidopsis thaliana, generated using ChimeraX. Part of the LOV2 domain is hidden for clarity of the active site containing FMN. The dotted blue lines represent hydrogen bonds predicted as important in binding. In green are Cys426 and Arg427 residues which are crucial in photoactivity and FMN binding, respectively, with mutations resulting in total loss of function of the protein. Upon photoexcitation, the sulfur (yellow) of Cys426 forms a covalent bond with the carbon 4 of FMN. (PDBe: 4EEP)

Phototropins have two distinct light, oxygen, or voltage regulated domains (LOV1, LOV2) that each bind flavin mononucleotide (FMN). The FMN is noncovalently bound to a LOV domain in the dark, but becomes covalently linked upon exposure to suitable light. The formation of the bond is reversible once light is no longer present. The forward reaction with light is not dependent on temperature, though low temperatures give increased stability of the covalent linkage, leading to a slower reversal reaction.

Light excitation will lead to a conformational change within the protein, which allows for kinase activity. There is also evidence to suggest that phototropins undergo autophosphorylation at various sites across the enzyme. Phototropins trigger signaling responses within the cell, but it is unknown which proteins are phosphorylated by phototropins, or exactly how the autophosphorylation events play a role in signaling.

Phototropins are typically found on the plasma membrane, but some phototropins have been found in substantial quantities on chloroplast membranes. One study found that phototropins on the plasma membrane play a role in phototropism, leaf flattening, stomatal opening, and chloroplast movements, while phototropins on the chloroplasts only partially affected stomatal opening and chloroplast movement, suggesting that the location of the protein in the cell may also play a role in its signaling function.

== Other sources ==
- Briggs WR, Olney MA (January 2001). "Photoreceptors in plant photomorphogenesis to date. Five phytochromes, two cryptochromes, one phototropin, and one superchrome". Plant Physiol. 125 (1): 85–8. doi:10.1104/pp.125.1.85. PMC 1539332. PMID 11154303.
- Peter E, Dick B, Baeurle SA (2010). "Mechanism of signal transduction of the LOV2-Jα photosensor from Avena sativa". Nat Commun. 1 (8) 122. Bibcode:2010NatCo...1..122P. doi:10.1038/ncomms1121. PMID 21081920.
- Christie JM (2007). "Phototropin Blue-Light Receptors". Annual Review of Plant Biology. 58 (1): 21–45. Bibcode:2007AnRPB..58...21C. doi:10.1146/annurev.arplant.58.032806.103951. PMID 17067285.
