= Larry Sandler =

American geneticist

- Born: 1929
- Died: 1987 (aged about 58)
- Education: Cornell University, University of Missouri (PhD)
- Known for: Elucidating meiotic drive
- Spouse: Iris Sandler
- Scientific career
- Institutions: Oak Ridge National Laboratory, University of Wisconsin, University of Washington
- Doctoral advisor: Ed Novitski
- Other academic advisors: James F. Crow

Laurence Marvin Sandler (1929–1987) was a "leading Drosophila geneticist", active during the mid-20th century. Sandler is best known for his work establishing and elucidating the phenomenon of meiotic drive. (Meiotic drive is when one copy of a gene is passed on to offspring more than the expected 50% of the time.)

Sandler earned a B.S. at Cornell University and did his doctoral work with Ed Novitski at the University of Missouri, where he collaborated with Gerry Braver. Braver and Sandler discovered that meiotic chromosomal loss was one driver of allelic variation in natural populations, (Sandler & Braver 1954.) a phenomenon coined "meiotic drive" in a follow-up paper by Sandler and Novitski. (Sandler & Novitski 1957.) Sandler also collaborated with Iris Sandler, his wife and fellow scientist, who also worked as a graduate student in Novitski's lab.

In 1956, Sandler briefly joined the Biology Division at Oak Ridge National Laboratory, where Sandler and Dan Lindsley worked on sperm dysfunction.

After joining the lab of Jim Crow at the University of Wisconsin, Sandler and Yuichiro Hiraizumi began working on segregation distortion, publishing several papers together.

Sandler moved to the University of Washington in 1962. There he supervised numerous graduate students who joined the field, including Bruce Baker, Adelaide T. Carpenter, Ian Duncan, Barry Ganetzky, Larry Goldstein, Kent Golic, Jeff Hall, Scott Hawley, Jim Mason, John Merriam, Joe O'Tousa, Leonard Robbins, Paul Szauter, Bill Sullivan, Jon Tomkiel, and Glenn Yasuda.

Sandler was professionally active, involved in the founding of the Drosophila Research Conference, and transferring it to the Genetics Society of America. He was also involved with other conferences, including the International Congress of Genetics, and as editor with numerous genetics journals, including Annual Review of Genetics and Genetics.

Sandler was married to fellow scientist Iris Sandler, who ultimately became a historian of science. The couple had two children, Jack and Dee Sandler. He died in 1987.

== Significant papers ==
- Sandler & Braver 1954, "The meiotic behavior of grossly deleted X chromosomes in Drosophila melanogaster", Genetics v.43, pp. 547–563.
- Sandler & Novitski 1957, "Meiotic drive as an evolutionary force," American Naturalist v.91, pp. 105–110.
- D. L. Lindsley & L. Sandler, 1958, "The meiotic behavior of grossly deleted X chromosomes in Drosophila melanogaster", Genetics, 43:547-563.
- Larry Sandler and Yuichiro Hiraizumi, 1960, "Meiotic drive in natural populations of Drosophila melanogaster", Genetics, 45:1671-1689 ("On the nature of the SD region").

== Awards and recognition ==
- Honoree of the Larry Sandler Memorial Award, for the best Drosophila-related dissertation
- 1991 Memorial Symposium on Meiotic Drive, published in American Naturalist (1991)
- Annual Sandler Lecture hosted by the genetics department at the University of Washington
