= Larry Sandler Memorial Award =

Biology award

The Larry Sandler Memorial Award is an international award given for research in the Drosophila community. The award is given for the best dissertation of the preceding year, and is given at the annual Drosophila Research Conference. Awardees may be nominated only by their graduate advisors.

The awardees give the Larry Sandler Memorial Lecture at the annual Drosophila Research Conference. The award honors Dr. Larry Sandler.

== Award recipients ==
- 1988 Bruce Edgar
- 1989 Kate Harding
- 1990 Michael Dickinson
- 1991 Maurice Kernan
- 1992 Doug Kellogg
- 1993 David Schneider
- 1994 Kendal Broadie
- 1995 David Begun
- 1996 Chaoyong Ma
- 1997 Abby Dernburg
- 1998 Nir Hacohen
- 1999 Terence Murphy
- 2000 Bin Chen
- 2001 James Wilhelm
- 2002 Matthew C. Gibson
- 2003 Sinisa Urban
- 2004 Sean McGuire
- 2005 Elissa Hallem
- 2006 Daniel Ortiz-Barrientos
- 2007 Yu-Chiun Wang
- 2008 Adam A. L. Friedman
- 2009 Timothy T. Weil
- 2010 Leonardo B. Koerich
- 2011 Daniel Babcock
- 2012 Stephanie Turner Chen
- 2013 Weizhe Hong
- 2014 Ruei-Jiun Hung
- 2015 Zhao Zhang
- 2016 Alejandra Figueroa-Clarevega
- 2017 Danny E. Miller
- 2018 Lucy Liu
- 2019 Laura Seeholzer
- 2020 Balint Kacsoh
- 2021 Ching-Ho Chang
- 2022 Lianna Wat
- 2023 James O'Connor
- 2024 Sherzod A. Tokamov
- 2025 Peiwei Chen

== Former chairs of the Award ==
- 1988 Chair: Barry Ganetzky
- 1989 Chair: Barry Ganetzky
- 1990 Chair: Barry Ganetzky
- 1991 Chair:
- 1992 Chair:
- 1993 Chair:
- 1994 Chair:
- 1995 Chair:
- 1996 Chair: Margaret Fuller ("Minx" Fuller)
- 1997 Chair: Larry Goldstein
- 1998 Chair: R. Scott Hawley
- 1999 Chair: Bill Sullivan
- 2000 Chair: Bill Saxton
- 2001 Chair: Lynn Cooley
- 2002 Chair: Steve DiNardo
- 2003 Chair: Amanda Simcox ("Mandy Simcox")
- 2004 Chair: Ross Cagan
- 2005 Chair: Gerold Schübiger
- 2006 Chair: R. Scott Hawley
- 2007 Chair: Helen Salz
- 2008 Chair: Mariana Wolfner
- 2009 Chair: John Carlson
- 2010 Chair: Robin Wharton
- 2011 Chair: Claude Desplan
- 2012 Chair: Richard Mann
- 2013 Chair: Kenneth Irvine
- 2014 Chair: Marc Freeman
- 2015 Chair: Erika Bach
- 2016 Chair: Daniela Drummond-Barbosa
- 2017 Chair: Bob Duronio
- 2018 Chair: Kim McCall
- 2019 Chair: Daniel Barbash
- 2020 Chair: Barbara Mellone
- 2021 Chair: Guy Tanentzapf
- 2022 Chair: Alissa Armstrong
- 2023 Chair: Tim Mosca
- 2024 Chair: Elizabeth Rideout
- 2025 Chair: Li Zhao

== See also ==
- List of biology awards
