= 1966 Dartmouth Literacy Conference =

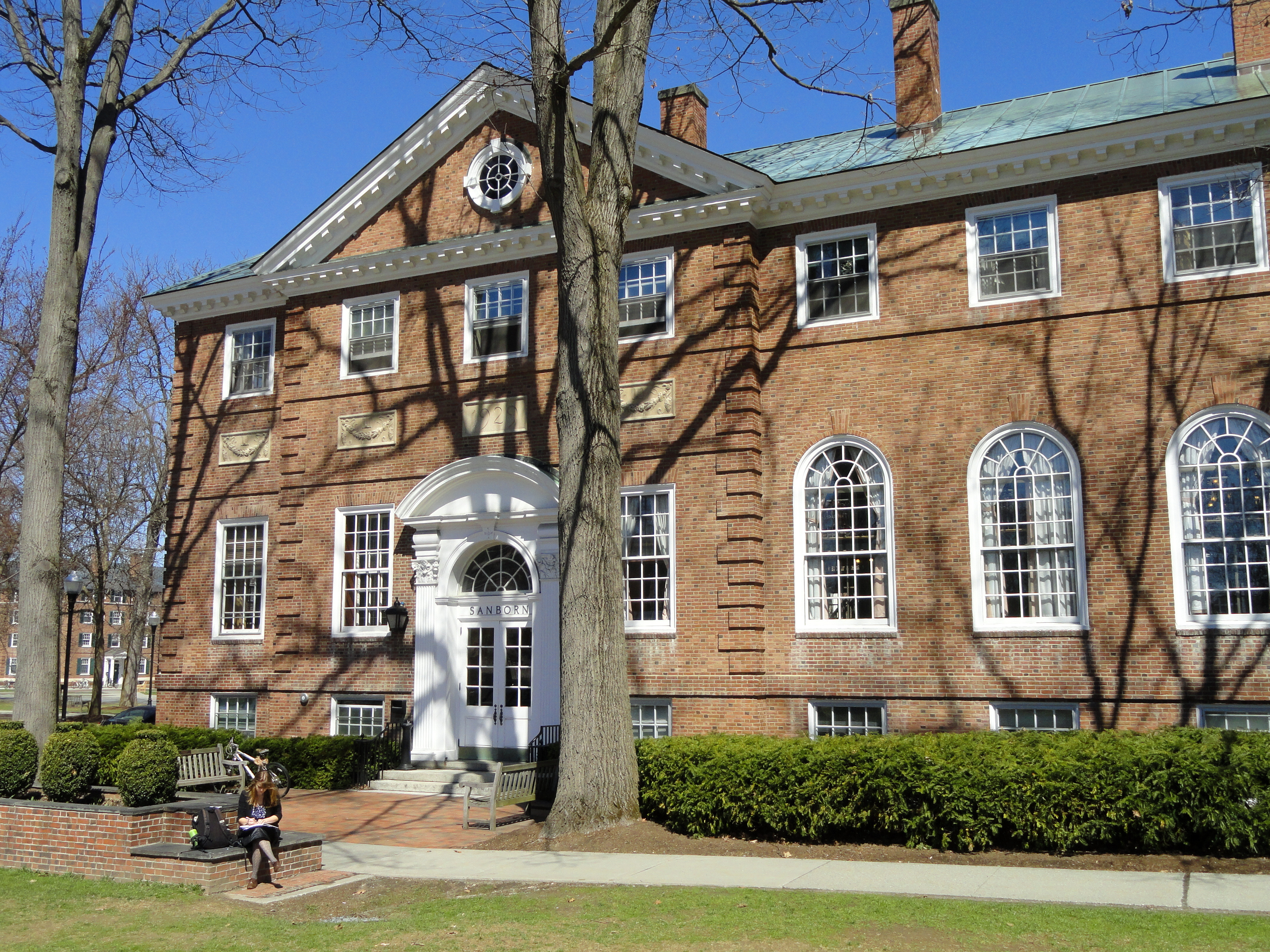
Location of the 1966 Dartmouth Literacy Conference

The Dartmouth Literacy conference started on August 20, 1966, and lasted a little over three weeks until September 16, 1966. The meetings original name was "Anglo-American Conference on the Teaching and Learning of English", but with the conference occurring at Dartmouth college it became widely known as "The Dartmouth Seminar". The Seminar was the foundation of change for the teaching of English and literature in the United States and the United Kingdom.

== Conference ==
The Seminar was in Sanborn Hall, which is still the English Department at Dartmouth college. The purpose of the conference was to rework how English was taught as a whole, and to determine the purpose of classes in English. The conference consisted of teachers from the United States, the United Kingdom, and a few teachers from Canada. The conference had a big variety of people who taught different levels of education. It ranged from teachers who taught elementary school all the way to college professors. There were about 70 people who took part in the Dartmouth literacy conference with about 50 English teachers and 20 others. The educators had degrees in linguistics, literature, English, and others. Even after the seminar the people continued to work on important issues with the English curriculum.

The organizer of the conference was Jim Squire. He received help from Arthur Jensen, a professor at Dartmouth, who was in charge of things locally, Albert Marckwardt, who was a linguist from Princeton, and Frank Whitehead from Sheffield University in the United Kingdom. The seminar formed the foundation for the teaching and writing of English in schools today.

== Leading up to the Conference ==
The decision to have a conference about literacy was because of the standards that were beginning to fall in the United states schools. The differences between the way teaching in the United States and the United Kingdom also rose the question of whether or not the education was adequate especially for English education. The things that American professors found surprising is that British educators do not have any written curriculum. The massive curriculum that the Americans were using surprised the British educators as well.

When selecting a location of the conference they wanted to find a place where the members would not be distracted easily. The decision of Dartmouth college was taken because the college was in a rural area and it would keep the participant away from the city nightlife. When leading up to the conference, it was decided that Herbert Muller and John Dixon would write about the conference. Although they were the only ones who reported on the conference, there was no formal agreement that the other participants could not give their point of view of the conference. Many of the participants had done studies and test before the conference which led them to have useful information to share with the others, An example is Albert Kitzhaber, who had done multiple different studies in the 1950s and the early 1960s that lead to the conclusion that they used poor textbooks, and had many other confusions in the curriculum. Leading up to the conference they decided on some topics of concern that everybody had towards the teaching of English. They came up with eleven topics of concern: "... the role and significance of the learner in the English classroom, the activities, subject matter, and conditions of the English classroom, the training-- both pre-service and in-service-- of the classroom teacher, and the importance of educating the public on what is meant by good English and what is meant by good English teaching." These concerns came from different levels of English education where some topics were more focused on elementary level English while others focus on college level English.

== At the Conference and afterwards ==
The conference was set up to have everyone split up into group of five or six people, and they would go over certain topics, and then they would reconvene with everyone else and discuss. The conference had three main topics being the place of literature in the school curriculum, the definition of English as a classroom subject, and the training of English teachers. The definition of English as a classroom subject was further broken down into other topics of interest like the meaning of "standard English", the interaction between speech and writing, the attention to process, and the role of technology effecting English.

Another question that needed an answer was what is the definition of English? They noticed that at the conference everyone could come up with relatively similar answers, but nobody could agree on the methodology that it should be taught. After combining the information that they knew they came to the conclusion that everyone learns in their own ways, but most people pick up language and grammar at earlier ages of around 5 to 6 years old. This helped to determine the new curriculum when teaching children to read and write.

The third topic that was discussed later on in the conference is instead of focusing on the process of English, they needed to focus on the product of it. Dixon who was at the conference stated "that this was an issue for some of the people are the conference." Literature in the English curriculum was one of the three main topics of the seminar. This topic had some disputed opinion on what should be done, but the overall consensus was that regarding literature a teacher should select topics that are diverse with information and knowledge to allow students to experience numerous perspectives. They also went on to say that the goal for the teacher is to make literature a joy for others. With teachers making literature and English more of a joy for other, it will make children more willing and likely to learn the subjects.

The topics of the conference so far have mainly focused on lower level English education, but there were multiple topics of college and university level English discussed. They went on to discuss how when people go to college they simply go for the degree for a better life down the road versus actually learning the material. They discussed ways for English educations to be different in colleges or universities, but they came up with mixed results.

Another one of the main three topics discussed at the conference was the training of the teachers or professors in both pre-service and in-service. This was the part of conference where it set up checkpoints for the English teachers to learn. Some of the requirements for the English teachers is that they should be familiar with who they are teaching, know the history of language, and they should be able to teach multiple types of literature like teaching speaking, dramatics, and creative writing. This would allow for teachers to have a better understanding of how they should teach English or literature depending on their students.

The Conference had a very big impact on how English and literature were taught in the United States and the United Kingdom for multiple years after the conference. There was no consensus curriculum although they had originally planned for it after the conference. Although they didn't create any curriculum many papers and books were written after attending the conference.

The US report of the conference was written by Herbert J. Muller, and the British report was written by John Dixon.

== People at the Conference ==
The Dartmouth literacy conference consisted of 47 core participants and 22 consultants who would attend from "time to time". It included linguists, teachers of English language and education, lecturers, primary school teachers, curriculum designers, and more. In the two major reports on the seminar, Uses of English and Growth through English, Herbert J. Muller and John Dixon write two lists: a list of "participants" and a list of "consultants." Both groups are included in the list below, with their status indicated. Some of the descriptions of the following people are from Muller's and Dixon's descriptions.

=== Participants ===
- David Abercrombie - Professor and Head of Phonetics Department at the University of Edinburgh. Author of Studies in Phonetics and Linguistics.
- Anthony Adams - Head of the English Department at Churchfields Comprehensive School in Birmingham.
- George Allen - Professor of Education at the University of Sussex. Muller writes he was formerly "Her Majesty's Staff Inspector in the Department of Education and Science."
- J. Jeffery Auer - Chairman and Professor in the Department of Speech and Theater at Indiana University.
- Douglas Barnes - Lecturer in Education at Leeds University. Chairman of National Association for the Teaching of English (NATE) 1967-1968.
- Wayne C. Booth - Dean of the College and George M. Pullman Professor of English at the University of Chicago. Member of the National Council of Teachers of English's (NCTE) Commission on Literature.
- James Nimmo Britton - Head of the English Department at the University of London Institute of Education.
- Frederic G. Cassidy - Professor of English at the University of Wisconsin. Editor of A Dictionary of American Regional English and Dictionary of Jamaican English.
- Merron Chorny - Assistant professor of English Education at the University of Calgary. Former principal at Grimshaw Public School and Chairman of the Standing Committee on the Formation of a Canadian Council of Teachers of English.
- Bernice Marks Christenson - Curriculum supervisor of Elementary English in Los Angeles Public Schools. Chariman of the NCTE Committee to Develop Dialect Recordings for Elementary Schools.
- Benjamin DeMott - Professor of English and Chairman of the English Department at Amherst College.
- John Dixon - Senior Lecturer in English at Bretton Hall College of Education in Yorkshire, and former head of the English Department at Walworth Comprehensive School in London. Wrote a summary of the conference proceedings, Growth through English.
- Wallace W. Douglas - Professor of English and Education, Northwestern University. Director of Northwestern Curriculum Study Center in English. Member of the English Materials Center Committee, Modern Language Association (MLA).
- Arthur M. Eastman - Professor English at the University of Michigan. Member of the NCTE Commission on the English Curriculum.
- John Hurt Fisher - Executive Secretary of MLA, Professor of English at New York University.
- Boris Ford - Dean of the School of Educational Studies at the University of Sussex. Chariman of NATE 1963-1964. He was an associate (and eventual enemy) of F. R. Leavis.
- W. Nelson Francis - Professor of Linguistics and English at Brown University. Trustee of the NCTE Research Foundation.
- Alfred H. Grommon - Professor of English and Education at Stanford University. First Vice President of the NCTE.
- Denys W. Harding - Professor of Psychology at the University of London. Former editor of Scrutiny, F. R. Leavis's journal.
- Barbara Hardy - Professor of English Language and Literature, Royal Holloway College, University of London.
- David Holbrook - Poet, novelist, and author of English for Maturity and English for the Rejected.
- Arthur E. Jensen - Professor of English at Dartmouth College. Chairman of the Dartmouth Seminar. Former chairman of the Committee on Examinations and Commission of English at College Entrance Examination Board (CEEB, now College Board).
- Esmor A. R. Jones - Honorary Secretary of NATE. Formerly Head of the English Department at Ashmead County Secondary School.
- Albert R. Kitzhaber - Professor of English at the University of Oregon, Director of the Oregon Curriculum Study Center in English. Former president of the NCTE. Muller occasionally misnames him as "Alfred" in Uses of English.
- Robert J. Lacampagne - Director of Special Projects and Achievement Awards, NCTE. Former high school teacher of English and drama.
- Albert L. Lavin - Supervisor of English and Teacher of Advanced Placement English, Tamalpais High School District in California.
- Evan Glyn Lewis, - Her Majesty's Staff Inspector, Department of Education and Science, London. Muller notes he was the Staff Inspector for the Welsh Office, specifically.
- Walter Loban - Associate Professor of Education, University of California, Berkeley.
- David D. Mackay - Nuffield Research Fellow, University College, London. Formerly a headmaster of a primary school in London.
- Albert H. Marckwardt - Director of the Dartmouth Seminar. Professor of English and Linguistics at Princeton University. President of the NCTE, former president of the Linguistic Society of America and the American Dialect Society. Writer of the foreword of Dixon's report.
- James E. Miller Jr. - Professor of English at the University of Chicago. Former editor of College English (1960-1966).
- James P. Moffett - Research Associate in English at the Harvard Graduate School of Education (1966-1967). Former teacher of French and English at Phillips Exeter Academy.
- Herbert J. Muller - Distinguished Service Professor of Government at Indiana University. Writer of Uses of English, one of the two large reports on the Dartmouth Seminar.
- Charles Muscatine - Professor of English at University of California, Berkeley.
- Paul A. Olson - Professor of English at the University of Nebraska. Director of the University of Nebraska Curriculum Study Center in English.
- Wayne A. O'Neil - Associate Professor of Education and Linguistics, Harvard University. Former Director of the Oregon Curriculum Study Center.
- William Wallace Robson - Fellow of Lincoln College, University of Oxford.
- Connie Rosen - Lecturer in Education, Goldsmiths College, University of London. Formerly headmistress of a primary school in London. Wife of Harold Rosen.
- Harold Rosen - Lecturer in Education at the University of London Institute of Education. Husband of Connie Rosen.
- John Sinclair - Professor of Modern English Language, University of Birmingham. Previously taught linguistics at the University of Edinburgh.
- James R. Squire - Professor of English, University of Illinois. Executive Secretary of the NCTE.
- Barbara M. H. Strang - Professor of English Language and General Linguistics, University of Newcastle upon Tyne.
- Geoffrey Summerfield - Lecturer in Education and English at the University of York. Formerly head of the English Department of the Churchfields Comprehensive School near Birmingham.
- Denys Thompson - Editor of The Use of English (not to be confused with Muller's report on the seminar, The Uses of English) since its foundation in 1948. Vice chairman of NATE from 1965 to 1967.
- Frank Whitehead - Senior Lecturer in English at the University of Sheffield Institute of Education. Chairman of NATE from 1965 to 1967.
- Reed Whittemore - Poet, staff member of the National Institute of Public Affairs. Formerly Consultant in Poetry to the Library of Congress and a Professor of English at Carleton College.
- Miriam E. Wilt - Professor of Early Childhood and Elementary Education, Temple University.

=== Consultants ===
- Dorothy K. Balfour - Elementary School Teacher, McKee Elementary School, Edmonton, Alberta. Dixon does not mention her in his report.
- Basil Bernard Bernstein - Reader in the Sociology of Education, University of London Institute of Education. Published widely on linguistics.
- Peter J. Caws - Chairman of the Department of Philosophy at Hunter College of the City University of New York. Consultant for the Carnegie Corporation of New York.
- Richard Corbin - Chairman of the English Department of Hunter College High School. President of the NCTE in 1965.
- Muriel Crosby - Assistant Superintendent for Educational Programs, Wilmington, Delaware. President of the NCTE in 1966.
- Eldonna L. Evertts - Associate Professor of Education at the University of Illinois. Assitant Executive Secretary of the NCTE.
- Joshua A. Fishman - University Research Professor of Social Sciences at Yeshiva University.
- Robin S. Harris - Professor of Higher Education at the University of Toronto, and the Principal of Innis College.
- Patrick D. Hazard - Chairman of the English Department at Beaver College.
- Robert F. Hogan - Associate Executive Secretary, NCTE.
- Frank McTeague - Head of the English Department at Mimico High School in Toronto.
- John J. Marcatante - Chairman of the English Department at Astonia Junior High School in Toronto.
- Susan Meyer Markle - Professor of Psychology, Bureau of Instructional Resources, University of Illinois, Chicago Circle.
- Sybil Marshall - Lecturer in Primary Education, Institute of Education, University of Sheffield.
- Walter H. Miner - Teacher of English at East High School in Cheyenne, Wyoming.
- Walter J. Ong, S.J. - Professor of English, Saint Louis University.
- Harley W. Parker - Head of Design at the Royal Ontario Museum at the University of Toronto.
- Henry Dan Piper - Dean of the College of Liberal Arts and Sciences at Southern Illinois University.
- Alan C. Purves - Associate Examiner in the Humanities, Educational Testing Service.
- Dorothy O. Saunders - Elementary School Teacher at Brookmont Elementary School in Bethesda, Maryland.
- Michael F. Shugrue - Assistant Secretary for English at the MLA.
- William Work - Executive Secretary for the Speech Association of America.
