= Bruce Baker (geneticist) =

American geneticist (1945–2018)

Bruce Stewart Baker (December 20, 1945 – July 1, 2018) was an American geneticist.

Baker was born to William K. Baker and Margaret I. Stewart in Swannanoa, North Carolina, on December 20, 1945, while his father served in the United States military. The first Drosophila Research Conference was hosted by his parents in 1958. Baker attended high school in Chicago. He enrolled at Reed College before graduating and earned his bachelor's degree in 1966. Baker then pursued graduate study at the University of Washington under Larry Sandler, receiving his doctorate in 1971. Baker remained at UW alongside Sandler before working with James F. Crow. In 1974, Baker began teaching at the University of North Carolina, Chapel Hill. He joined the University of California, San Diego faculty in 1976, before moving to Stanford University in 1986. In 1993, Baker was named a National Academy of Sciences member. That same year, Baker began his term as vice president of the Genetics Society of America, and was named president of the GSA in 1994. Stanford appointed Baker as Dr. Morris Herzstein Professor of Biological Sciences in 2001. He left the university in 2008 for a position at the Howard Hughes Medical Institute's Janelia Research Campus. Baker retired in 2016, and died at the age of 72 on July 1, 2018.
