= Kathleen Collins (disambiguation) =

Kathleen Collins (1942–1988) was African-American writer, filmmaker, and educator.

Kathleen Collins may also refer to:

- Kathleen Collins (actress) (1903–1994), American silent film actress
- Bo Derek (Mary Cathleen Collins, born 1956), American actress, credited as Kathleen Collins in the 1981 film Fantasies
- Kathleen Collins (scientist), American biophysicist and professor
- Katie Shea Collins (born 2005), American soccer player
