= Hermann Joseph Muller =

American biologist (1890–1967)

Hermann Joseph Muller ForMemRS
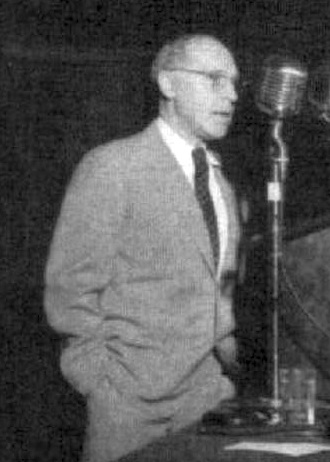
- Muller in 1952
- Born: December 21, 1890; New York City, U.S.
- Died: April 5, 1967 (aged 76); Indianapolis, Indiana, U.S.
- Education: Columbia University
- Known for: The genetic effects of radiation
- Spouses: Jessie Marie Jacobs (m. 1923); Dorothea Kantorowicz (m. 1939)
- Children: 2, including David E. Muller
- Relatives: Mala Htun (granddaughter)
- Awards: 1927: Newcomb Cleveland Prize; 1946 Nobel Prize in Physiology or Medicine; Linnean Society of London's Darwin–Wallace Medal (1958); 1963 Humanist of the Year (American Humanist Association)
- Scientific career
- Fields: Genetics, molecular biology
- Doctoral advisor: Thomas Hunt Morgan
- Doctoral students: Charlotte Auerbach; H. Bentley Glass; Clarence Paul Oliver; Elof Axel Carlson; Wilson Stone; Guido Pontecorvo

Hermann Joseph Muller (December 21, 1890 – April 5, 1967) was an American geneticist who was awarded the 1946 Nobel Prize in Physiology or Medicine "for the discovery of the production of mutations by means of X-ray irradiation". Muller warned of long-term dangers of radioactive fallout from nuclear war and nuclear testing, which resulted in greater public scrutiny of these practices.

== Early life ==
Muller was born in New York City, the son of Frances (Lyons) and Hermann Joseph Muller Sr., an artisan who worked with metals. Muller was a third-generation American whose father's ancestors were originally Catholic and came to the United States from Koblenz. His mother's family was of mixed Jewish (descended from Spanish and Portuguese Jews) and Anglican background, and had come from Britain. Among his first cousins was Alfred Kroeber (father of Ursula Le Guin) and first cousins once removed was Herbert J. Muller. As an adolescent, Muller attended a Unitarian church and considered himself a pantheist; in high school, he became an atheist. He excelled in the public schools. At 16, he entered Columbia College. From his first semester, he was interested in biology; he became an early convert of the Mendelian-chromosome theory of heredity—and the concept of genetic mutations and natural selection as the basis for evolution. He formed a biology club and also became a proponent of eugenics; the connections between biology and society would be his perennial concern. Muller earned a Bachelor of Arts degree in 1910.

Muller remained at Columbia (the pre-eminent American zoology program at the time, due to E. B. Wilson and his students) for graduate school. He became interested in the Drosophila genetics work of Thomas Hunt Morgan's fly lab after undergraduate bottle washers Alfred Sturtevant and Calvin Bridges joined his biology club. In 1911–1912, he studied metabolism at Cornell University, but remained involved with Columbia. He followed the drosophilists as the first genetic maps emerged from Morgan's experiments, and joined Morgan's group in 1912 (after two years of informal participation).

In the fly group, Muller's contributions were primarily theoretical—explanations for experimental results and ideas and predictions for new experiments. In the emerging collaborative culture of the drosophilists, however, credit was assigned based on results rather than ideas; Muller felt cheated when he was left out of major publications.

== Career ==
In 1914, Julian Huxley offered Muller a position at the recently founded William Marsh Rice Institute, now Rice University; he hurried to complete his Doctor of philosophy degree and moved to Houston for the beginning of the 1915–1916 academic year (his degree was issued in 1916). At Rice, Muller taught biology and continued Drosophila lab work. In 1918, he proposed an explanation for the dramatic discontinuous alterations in Oenothera lamarckiana that were the basis of Hugo de Vries's theory of mutationism: "balanced lethals" allowed the accumulation of recessive mutations, and rare crossing over events resulted in the sudden expression of these hidden traits. In other words, de Vries's experiments were explainable by the Mendelian-chromosome theory. Muller's work was increasingly focused on mutation rate and lethal mutations. In 1918, Morgan, short-handed because many of his students and assistants were drafted for the U.S. entry into World War I, convinced Muller to return to Columbia to teach and to expand his experimental program.

At Columbia, Muller and his collaborator and longtime friend Edgar Altenburg continued the investigation of lethal mutations. The primary method for detecting such mutations was to measure the sex ratios of the offspring of female flies. They predicted the ratio would vary from 1:1 due to recessive mutations on the X chromosome, which would be expressed only in males (which lacked the functional allele on a second X chromosome). Muller found a strong temperature dependence in mutation rate, leading him to believe that spontaneous mutation was the dominant mode (and to initially discount the role of external factors such as ionizing radiation or chemical agents). In 1920, Muller and Altenburg coauthored a seminal paper in Genetics on "modifier genes" that determine the size of mutant Drosophila wings. In 1919, Muller made the important discovery of a mutant (later found to be a chromosomal inversion) that appeared to suppress crossing over, which opened up new avenues in mutation-rate studies. However, his appointment at Columbia was not continued; he accepted an offer from the University of Texas and left Columbia after the summer of 1920.

Muller taught at the University of Texas from 1920 until 1932. Soon after returning to Texas, he married mathematics professor Jessie Marie Jacobs, whom he had courted previously. In his early years at Texas, Muller's Drosophila work was slow going; the data from his mutation rate studies were difficult to interpret. In 1923, he began using radium and X-rays, but the relationship between radiation and mutation was difficult to measure because such radiation also sterilized the flies. In this period, he also became involved with eugenics and human genetics. He carried out a study of twins separated at birth that seemed to indicate a strong hereditary component of I.Q. Muller was critical of the new directions of the eugenics movement (such as anti-immigration), but was hopeful about the prospects for positive eugenics. In 1932, at the Third International Eugenics Congress, Muller gave a speech and stated, "eugenics might yet perfect the human race, but only in a society consciously organized for the common good".

=== Discovery of X-ray mutagenesis ===
In 1926, a series of major breakthroughs began. In November, Muller carried out two experiments with varied doses of X-rays, the second of which used the crossing over suppressor stock ("ClB") he had found in 1919. A clear, quantitative connection between radiation and lethal mutations quickly emerged. Muller's discovery created a media sensation after he delivered a paper entitled "The Problem of Genetic Modification" at the Fifth International Congress of Genetics in Berlin; it would make him one of the better-known public intellectuals of the early 20th century. By 1928, others had replicated his dramatic results, expanding them to other model organisms, such as wasps and maize. In the following years, he began publicizing the likely dangers of radiation exposure in humans (such as physicians who frequently operate X-ray equipment or shoe sellers who radiated their customers' feet).

His lab grew quickly, but it shrank again following the onset of the Great Depression. Especially after the stock market crash, Muller was increasingly pessimistic about the prospects of capitalism. Some of his visiting lab members were from the USSR, and he helped edit and distribute an illegal leftist student newspaper, The Spark. It was a difficult period for Muller both scientifically and personally; his marriage was falling apart, and he was increasingly dissatisfied with his life in Texas. Meanwhile, the waning of the eugenics movement, ironically hastened by his own work pointing to the previously ignored connections between environment and genetics, meant that his ideas on the future of human evolution had reduced impact in the public sphere. Muller's speech before the Third International Eugenics Conference in New York has been credited with marking the end of Galtonism, and perhaps even eugenics itself, as a popular movement in the sciences. H. Bentley Glass, a contemporary observer and Ph.D. student of Muller's, would say Muller's speech "just about finished the activity of the Eugenics Society". Muller told the assembled that eugenic ideals could no longer be achieved, because the capitalistic system produces the wrong motives of individual action, and he disdained the natures of the dominant class, and the type of society they were creating.

=== Work in Europe ===
In September 1932, Muller moved to Berlin to work with the Russian expatriate geneticist Nikolay Timofeeff-Ressovsky; a trip intended as a limited sabbatical stretched into an eight-year, five-country journey. In Berlin, he met two physicists who would later be significant to the biology community: Niels Bohr and Max Delbrück. The Nazi movement was precipitating the rapid emigration of scientific talent from Germany, and Muller was particularly opposed to the politics of National Socialism. The FBI was investigating Muller because of his involvement with The Spark, so he chose instead to go to the Soviet Union (an environment better suited to his political beliefs). In 1933, Muller and his wife reconciled, and their son David E. Muller and she moved with Hermann to Leningrad. There, at the Institute of Genetics, he imported the basic equipment for a Drosophila lab—including the flies—and set up shop. The institute was moved to Moscow in 1934, and Muller and his wife were divorced in 1935.

In the USSR, Muller supervised a large and productive lab, and organized work on medical genetics. Most of his work involved further explorations of genetics and radiation. There he completed his eugenics book, Out of the Night, the main ideas of which dated to 1910. By 1936, however, Joseph Stalin's repressive policies and the rise of Lysenkoism was making the USSR an increasingly problematic place to live and work. Muller and many of the Russian genetics community did what they could to oppose Trofim Lysenko and his Larmarckian evolutionary theory, but Muller was soon forced to leave the Soviet Union after Stalin read a translation of his eugenics book and was "displeased by it, and...ordered an attack prepared against it." By this time, Muller had already asked for a leave of absence. News of the Lysenko trials had reached the United States, and his son David was being raised there, after his divorce. In the official declaration by the institute, biological determinism was rejected: "The development of society is subject not to biological laws but to higher social laws. Attempts to spread to humanity the laws of the animal kingdom are an attempt to lower the human being to the level of beasts."

Muller, with about 250 strains of Drosophila, moved to University of Edinburgh in September 1937, after brief stays in Madrid and Paris. In 1938, with war on the horizon, he began looking for a permanent position back in the United States. He also began courting Dorothea "Thea" Kantorowicz, a German refugee; they were married in May 1939. The Seventh International Congress on Genetics was held in Edinburgh later that year; Muller wrote a "Geneticists' Manifesto" in response to the question: "How could the world's population be improved most effectively genetically?" He also engaged in a debate with the perennial genetics gadfly Richard Goldschmidt over the existence of the gene, for which little direct physical evidence existed at the time.

=== Later career ===
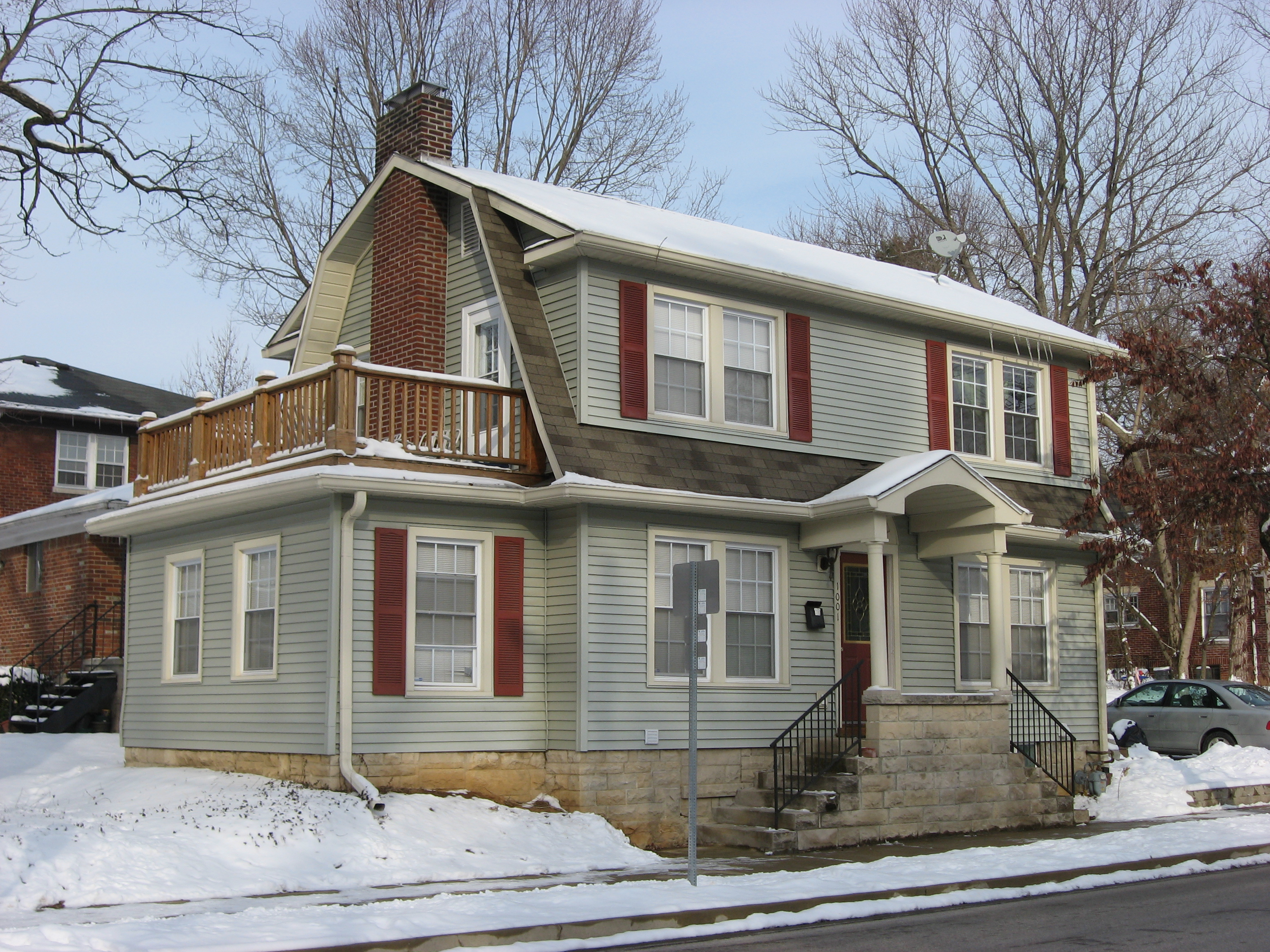
Muller's house in Bloomington, Indiana

When Muller returned to the United States in 1940, he took an untenured research position at Amherst College, in the department of Otto C. Glaser. After the U.S. entry into World War II, his position was extended indefinitely and expanded to include teaching. His Drosophila work in this period focused on measuring the rate of spontaneous (as opposed to radiation-induced) mutations. Muller's publication rate decreased greatly in this period, from a combination of lack of lab workers and experimentally challenging projects. However, he also worked as an adviser in the Manhattan Project (though he did not know that was what it was), as well as a study of the mutational effects of radar. Muller's appointment was ended after the 1944–1945 academic year, and despite difficulties stemming from his socialist political activities, he found a position as professor of zoology at Indiana University. Here, he lived in a Dutch Colonial Revival house in Bloomington's Vinegar Hill neighborhood.

In 1946, Muller was awarded the Nobel Prize in Physiology or Medicine, "for the discovery that mutations can be induced by X-rays". Genetics, and especially the physical and physiological nature of the gene, was becoming a central topic in biology, and X-ray mutagenesis was a key to many recent advances, among them George Beadle and Edward Tatum's work on Neurospora that established in 1941 the one gene-one enzyme hypothesis. In Muller's Nobel Prize lecture, he argued that no threshold dose of radiation existed that did not produce mutagenesis, which led to the adoption of the linear no-threshold model of radiation on cancer risks.

The Nobel Prize, in the wake of the atomic bombings of Hiroshima and Nagasaki, focused public attention on a subject Muller had been publicizing for two decades - the dangers of radiation. In 1952, nuclear fallout became a public issue; since Operation Crossroads, more and more evidence had been leaking out about radiation sickness and death caused by nuclear testing. Muller and many other scientists pursued an array of political activities to defuse the threat of nuclear war. With the Castle Bravo fallout controversy in 1954, the issue became even more urgent. In 1955, Muller was one of 11 prominent intellectuals to sign the Russell–Einstein Manifesto, the upshot of which was the first 1957 Pugwash Conference on Science and World Affairs, which addressed the control of nuclear weapons. He was a signatory (with many other scientists) of the 1958 petition to the United Nations, calling for an end to nuclear weapons testing, which was initiated by the Nobel Prize-winning chemist Linus Pauling.

Muller's opinions on the effect of radiation on mutagenesis were used by Rachel Carson in her book Silent Spring, however, his opinions have been criticized by some scientists; geneticist James F. Crow called Muller's view "alarmist" and wrote that it created in the public "an irrational fear of low-level radiation relative to other risks". It has been argued that Muller's opinion was not supported by studies on the survivors of the atomic bombings, or by research on mice, and that he ignored another study that contradicted the linear no-threshold model he supported, thereby affecting the formulation of policy that favored this model. He was also accused of suppressing opposing views and of being part of a US National Academy of Sciences Committee that misrepresented the research record to secure continued funding and strengthen his influence on US health policy.

Muller was elected to the American Academy of Arts and Sciences in 1942 and the American Philosophical Society in 1947 Muller was awarded the Linnean Society of London's Darwin-Wallace Medal in 1958 and the Kimber Genetics Award of the U.S. National Academy of Sciences, of which he was a member, in 1955. He served as president of the American Humanist Association from 1956 to 1958. The American Mathematical Society selected him as its Gibbs Lecturer for 1958. He retired in 1964. The Drosophila basic units of inheritance, their chromosomal arms, are named "Muller elements" in Muller's honor. He died in 1967.

H. J. Muller and science fiction writer Ursula K. Le Guin were first cousins once removed; his father (Hermann J. Muller Sr.) and her father's mother (Johanna Muller Kroeber) were siblings, the children of Nicholas Müller, who immigrated to the United States in 1848, and at that time dropped the umlaut from his name. Another cousin was Herbert J. Muller, whose grandfather Otto was another son of Nicholas and a sibling of Hermann Sr. and Johanna.

=== Legacy ===
In a retrospective article about Muller's contribution, James Haber wrote as follows:

Drosophila geneticist, Hermann Muller, envisioned the fundamental principles that such a molecule must have: to be auto-assembling and to be mutable but then again stable. He followed his prescient review of these properties with a remarkable prediction: learning about the hereditary material and its properties would not come from studying Drosophila, but from studying bacteria and their bacteriophages.

== Global policy ==
He was one of the signatories of the agreement to convene a convention for drafting a world constitution. As a result, for the first time in human history, a World Constituent Assembly convened to draft and adopt a Constitution for the Federation of Earth.

== Personal life ==
Muller had a daughter, Helen J. Muller, now a professor emerita at the University of New Mexico. Her daughter, Mala Htun, formerly of the New School in NYC, was also a professor at the University of New Mexico until her death in January 2025. Muller's son, David E. Muller, professor emeritus of mathematics and computer science at the University of Illinois and at New Mexico State University, died in 2008 in Las Cruces, New Mexico. David's children include Kenneth J. Muller, professor of neurobiology at U. of Miami, and Chandra L. Muller, professor of sociology at U. of Texas, Austin. David's mother was Jessie Jacobs Muller Offermann (1890–1954), Hermann's first wife. Helen's mother was Dorothea Kantorowicz Muller (1909–1986), Hermann's second wife, who came to the U.S. in 1940 as a German Jewish refugee. He had a brief affair with Milly Bennett.

== Notable former students ==
- Raissa L. Berg
- Elof Axel Carlson
- H. Bentley Glass
- C. P. Oliver
- Wilson Stone
- James Watson

Former postdoctoral fellows

- George D. Snell

Worked in lab as undergraduates

- Carl Sagan

== Bibliography ==
- Hermann Joseph Muller, Modern Concept of Nature (SUNY Press, 1973). ISBN 0-87395-096-8.
- Hermann Joseph Muller, Man's Future Birthright (SUNY Press, 1973). ISBN 0-87395-097-6.
- H. J. Muller, Out of the Night: A Biologist's View of the Future (Vanguard Press, 1935).
- H. J. Muller, Studies in Genetics: The Selected Papers of H. J. Muller (Indiana University Press, 1962).

== See also ==
- Mutagenesis
- Bateson–Dobzhansky–Muller model
- Repository for Germinal Choice
- Muller's ratchet
- Muller's morphs
- History of biology
- History of genetics
- History of model organisms
- List of Jewish Nobel laureates
