= Anne Villeneuve =

Anne Villeneuve may refer to:

- Anne Villeneuve (illustrator) (born 1966), Canadian writer and illustrator
- Anne Villeneuve (scientist), American geneticist

== See also ==
- Annie Villeneuve (born 1983), French-Canadian pop singer-songwriter
