= Daniela Drummond-Barbosa =

Brazilian-American geneticist

- Born: Daniela Drummond Barbosa; Los Angeles, California, U.S.
- Education: Federal University of Minas Gerais; Yale University
- Scientific career
- Workplaces: Johns Hopkins Bloomberg School of Public Health; University of Wisconsin-Madison
- Thesis: Requirements for bovine papillomavirus E5-induced mitogenic signaling through the platelet-derived growth factor beta receptor (1995)

Daniela Drummond-Barbosa is a Brazilian-American geneticist who is a professor of genetics at the University of Wisconsin–Madison. She works as an investigator of regenerative biology at Morgridge Institute for Research. Drummond-Barbosa earned her bachelor's degree at Federal University of Minas Gerais and her P.h.D at Yale University. Her research focuses on germline stem cell lineage metabolism and maintenance as well as the physiology of Drosophila melanogaster. These contributions have broader implications detailing diet and temperature's impacts on fertility.

== Early life and education ==
Drummond-Barbosa was born in Los Angeles, California, and grew up in Belo Horizonte in Brazil. She earned her undergraduate degree in biochemistry and immunology at the Federal University of Minas Gerais in 1991. She moved to New Haven, Connecticut, for her graduate studies at Yale University. Her graduate studies took place at the Genetics Program, where she received her M.Phil. in 1993. Drummond-Barbosa pursued further education where she worked with Daniel DiMaio for her P.h.D. research. Her doctoral research focused on the interactions between platelet-derived growth factor receptors and the bovine papillomavirus E5 protein. She received her P.h.D. from Yale University in 1995.

Drummond-Barbosa completed postdoctoral training at the Carnegie Institution for Science studying Drosophila melanogaster with Allan C. Spradling. Her post doctoral research focused on the adult tissue stem cell regeneration of fruit flies and she first identified that stem cells and their derivatives responded to diet.

== Research and career ==
=== Vanderbilt ===
Drummond-Barbosa continued to study the regulation of stem cells as she started her independent career, as an assistant professor, at Vanderbilt University in 2002. During this time, she focused on how germline stem cells are regulated by diet and the control of meiotic maturation in the model organism, Drosophila.

=== Johns Hopkins ===
In 2009 Drummond-Barbosa was appointed to Johns Hopkins Bloomberg School of Public Health as an investigator and professor, where she eventually achieved tenure status. There, she continued her research considering adult stem cells' ability to sense and respond to external and systemic environments such as manipulated diets, temperature, and other stressors. She has focused on the ovarian stem cells of Drosophila and how they respond to diet, concentrating specifically on hormones, insulin and adipose tissue.

=== University of Wisconsin–Madison ===
Drummond-Barbosa left Johns Hopkins University in 2022 and is currently teaching and investigating further at University of Wisconsin–Madison in the Morgridge Institute for Research.

=== Memberships and organizations ===
Drummond-Barbosa is attributed with co-organizing the Genetics Society of America's 55th annual Drosophila research conference in 2014. Soon after, she served as a selection committee member, then chair, of the Larry Sandler Memorial Award given by the Genetics Society of America (2015–2016) As well, she served as chair of the peer review committee for the American Cancer Society until 2017. Recently (2016-2020), she served as a member of the national institutes of health within the Cellular Mechanisms in Aging and Development section of study.

Most recently, Drummond-Barbosa has been acting as an associate editor for Genetics (journal).

=== Implications ===
Drummond-Barbosa's research introduces a novel study surrounding the control and maintenance of germline stem cells in Drosophila, allowing for broader impacts such as infertility, obesity, and climate change to be understood. For example, she has facilitated research implying that the increased temperatures associated with climate change may impact oogenesis and spermatogenesis negatively. As well, her work has illustrated a link between infertility and diet.

== Awards ==
- 1990 Conselho Nacional de Pesquisas Scientific Initiation Fellowship
- 1997 National Institutes of Health National Research Service Award
- 2006 Vanderbilt University Chancellor's Award for Research
- 2007 American Cancer Society Research Scholar
- 2014 Elected Fellow of the American Association for the Advancement of Science
- 2017 Johns Hopkins University Shikani/El Hibri Prize for Discovery & Innovation

== Selected publications ==
Below is a list of publications that Daniela Drummond-Barbosa did at the beginning of her career, co-authored in, and articles that contributed to the scientific community as a whole.

- Spradling, Allan; Drummond-Barbosa, Daniela; Kai, Toshie (2001-11-01). "Stem cells find their niche". Nature. 414 (6859): 98–104. doi:10.1038/35102160. ISSN 1476-4687. PMID 11689954. S2CID 2904709.
- Drummond-Barbosa, Daniela; Spradling, Allan C. (2001-03-01). "Stem Cells and Their Progeny Respond to Nutritional Changes during Drosophila Oogenesis". Developmental Biology. 231 (1): 265–278. doi:10.1006/dbio.2000.0135. ISSN 0012-1606. PMID 11180967.
- LaFever, Leesa; Drummond-Barbosa, Daniela (2005-08-12). "Direct Control of Germline Stem Cell Division and Cyst Growth by Neural Insulin in Drosophila". Science. 309 (5737): 1071–1073. doi:10.1126/science.1111410. ISSN 0036-8075. PMID 16099985. S2CID 9740455.
- Hsu, Hwei-Jan; Drummond-Barbosa, Daniela(2009-01-27). Insulin levels control female germline stem cell maintenance via the niche in Drosophila. PNAS. 106 (4): 1117-1122. https://doi.org/10.1073/pnas.0809144106.
- P.Gandara, Anna; Drummond-Barbosa, Daniela (2022-03-07), "Development", Warm and cold temperatures have distinct germline stem cell lineage effects during Drosophila oogenesis, vol. 149, no. 5, The Company of Biologist. doi:https://doi.org/10.1242/dev.200149
- Dutra Nunes, Rodrigo; Drummond-Barbosa, Daniela (2023-06-13), "Development", A high-sugar diet, but not obesity, reduces female fertility in Drosophila melanogaster, vol. 150, no. 20, The Company of Biologists. doi:https://doi.org/10.1242/dev.201769
- P.Gandara, Ana Caroline (2023-06-30), "Nature", Chronic exposure to warm temperature causes low sperm abundance and quality in Drosophila melanogaster, vol. 13, no. 12331, Nature, Scientific Reports. doi: https://doi.org/10.1038/s41598-023-39360-7v
