= Susan Meyer =

Susan Meyer may refer to:

- Susan Sauvé Meyer, Canadian philosopher and professor of philosophy
- Susan Mayer, a fictional character played by Teri Hatcher on the American TV series Desperate Housewives
- Susan E. Mayer, behavioral economist and sociologist
- Susan Meyer Markle (1928–2008), American psychologist
