= Early Career Life Scientist Award =

ASCB Early Career Life Scientist Award
- Description: Recognition for outstanding early-career scientists in cell biology
- Country: United States
- Presented by: American Society for Cell Biology (ASCB)
- Rewards: Monetary prize & Speaking slot at Annual Meeting
- Website: www.ascb.org/award/early-career-life-scientist-award/

The ASCB Early Career Life Scientist Award is awarded by the American Society for Cell Biology to an outstanding scientist who earned his doctorate no more than 12 years earlier and who has served as an independent investigator for no more than seven years. The winner speaks at the ASCB Annual Meeting and receives a monetary prize.

== Awardees ==
Source: American Society for Cell Biology

- 2025 Itay Budin
- 2024 Monther Abu-Remaileh
- 2023 Sichen (Susan) Shao
- 2022 Dorothy Lerit
- 2021 Rushika Perera
- 2020 James Olzmann
- 2019 Cignall Kadoch
- 2018 Sergiu Pasca
- 2017 Meng Wang
- 2016 Bo Huang;Valentina Greco
- 2015 Vladimir Denic
- 2014 Manuel Thery
- 2013 Douglas B. Weibel
- 2012 Iain Cheeseman
- 2012 Gia Voeltz
- 2011 Maxence V. Nachury
- 2010 Anna Kashina
- 2009 Martin W. Hetzer
- 2008 Arshad B. Desai
- 2007 Abby Dernburg
- 2006 Karsten Weis
- 2005 Eva Nogales
- 2004 No award this year
- 2003 Frank Gertler
- 2002 Kathleen Collins and Benjamin Cravatt
- 2001 Daphne Preuss
- 2000 Erin O'Shea
- 1999 Raymond Deshaies

== See also ==
- List of biology awards
