= Thomas W. Cline =

American geneticist (born 1946)

- Born: May 6, 1946 (age 80)
- Known for: Research on sex determination in Drosophila melanogaster and the Sex-lethal (Sxl) gene
- Spouse: Barbara J. Meyer
- Awards: NAS Award in Molecular Biology (1992); Edward Novitski Prize (2010)
- Scientific career
- Fields: Genetics, developmental biology
- Institutions: University of California, Berkeley

Thomas W. Cline (born May 6, 1946) is an American geneticist known for his research on the genetic mechanisms of sex determination in the fruit fly Drosophila melanogaster. He is a professor emeritus at the University of California, Berkeley. His work focused particularly on the regulation and function of the master regulatory gene Sex-lethal (Sxl), which controls sexual development and dosage compensation in flies.

Cline's research helped understand how chromosomal signals determine sexual identity during early development and how these signals regulate RNA splicing and gene expression pathways controlling sex determination. His work also explored the evolutionary dynamics of sex-determination systems.

Cline was elected to the National Academy of Sciences in 1996 in recognition of his contributions to genetics.

== Career ==
Before joining the faculty at the University of California, Berkeley, Cline was a tenured professor at Princeton University, while his wife, geneticist Barbara J. Meyer, was a faculty member at the Massachusetts Institute of Technology. The two jointly moved to Berkeley.

Cline and Meyer collaborated scientifically, including co-authoring review articles comparing mechanisms of sex determination in different organisms.

== Research ==
Cline's research focused on the genetic mechanisms that determine sexual development and dosage compensation in Drosophila melanogaster. His early work used classical genetics to analyze maternal-effect mutations affecting sex determination, including studies of the gene daughterless, which demonstrated temperature-sensitive and sex-specific developmental effects during embryogenesis. Further genetic analysis by Cline demonstrated that mutations in the gene Sex-lethal (Sxl) could transform genetically male tissue toward female development, helping establish Sxl as the central regulatory switch controlling sex determination and dosage compensation in Drosophila. These observations helped establish the genetic hierarchy controlling sex determination and dosage compensation.

Subsequent work by Cline helped clarify the role of daughterless as a maternally supplied regulatory factor required for activation of the master sex-determination gene Sex-lethal (Sxl). These studies demonstrated that the gene plays multiple developmental roles and functions differently in germ-line and somatic tissues.

Cline also contributed to identifying the molecular signals that communicate the X chromosome–to–autosome ratio that determines sex in flies. Work with colleagues showed that components of the achaete–scute complex encode transcription factors that act as X-linked signal elements regulating the activation of Sxl.

Later publications identified additional components of the signaling network controlling Sxl, including factors acting through the JAK/STAT signaling pathway, demonstrating that extracellular signaling molecules can function as elements of the sex-determination signal.

== Honors and awards ==
- NAS Award in Molecular Biology (1992)
- Fellow, American Academy of Arts and Sciences (1994)
- Member, National Academy of Sciences (1996)
- Edward Novitski Prize (2010)

== Personal life ==
Cline is married to geneticist Barbara J. Meyer.
