= Michael Dickinson (biologist) =

American biologist (born 1963)

- Born: Michael H. Dickinson; 1963 (age 62–63); Seaford, Delaware, U.S.
- Education: Brown University (BS); University of Washington (PhD)
- Occupation: Biologist
- Awards: Larry Sandler Memorial Award (1990)
- Scientific career
- Fields: Biological engineering; Neuroscience

Michael H. Dickinson (born 1963) is an American fly bioengineer and neuroscientist, and Zarem Professor of Biology and Bioengineering at the California Institute of Technology. He studies Drosophila flight control systems and sensory processing and was dubbed the Fly Guy by The Scientist.

== Early life and education ==
Dickinson was born in Seaford, Delaware, in 1963 but grew up in Baltimore before moving to Philadelphia. He graduated from Brown University with a B.S. in 1984, and from University of Washington with a Ph.D. in 1989. He did his postdoctoral work with Karl Georg Götz at the University of Tübingen.

== Career and Research ==
He was an assistant professor at the University of Chicago in 1991, before moving to the University of California, Berkeley, in 1996. He was at California Institute of Technology from 2002 to 2011 before moving to the University of Washington from 2010 to 2014. He is now back at Caltech.

He is a Monitoring Editor at the Journal of Experimental Biology. He was a course director of the Neural Systems and Behavior course at the Marine Biological Laboratory.

== Awards ==
- 1990 Larry Sandler Memorial Award
- 2001 MacArthur Fellows Program
- 2008 American Academy of Arts and Sciences

== Sources ==
- "Micro Warfare", Popular Mechanics, Feb 2001
- "Flyorama", Popular Science, Dec 2002
