= John Thomas Patterson (geneticist) =

American geneticist (1878–1960)

- Born: November 3, 1878; Piqua, Ohio, US
- Died: December 4, 1960
- Education: College of Wooster, University of Chicago
- Alma mater: College of Wooster; University of Chicago
- Known for: The mechanism by which a pigeon embryo forms
- Spouse: Alice Jane Tozer
- Awards: Daniel Giraud Elliot Medal
- Scientific career
- Fields: Embryology, Genetics
- Institutions: University of Texas at Austin

John Thomas Patterson (November 3, 1878 – December 4, 1960) was an American geneticist and professor at the University of Texas.

== Early life ==
Patterson was born from James and Anna Patterson in a family of 5 children on a farm near Piqua, Ohio on November 3, 1878.

As a child he attended a nearby county school, completing 9 grades before contracting pneumonia. He returned to his studies in his late teens at a school in Ada, Ohio. in 1900 he began his studies as a B.A. undergraduate at the College of Wooster.

He had aspired to study medicine and as such enrolled at the University of Chicago to better prepare himself. But there he was only allowed to study zoology as they were the only courses available in the summer quarter. He was persuaded to stay on as a researcher and subsequently completed his Ph.D. in June 1908.

While teaching at Buena Vista College he met his future spouse Alice Jane Tozier, a teacher in English and Latin, with whom he bought a house in Woods Hole, Massachusetts.

== Career ==
At the University of Texas Patterson undertook his first problem, an investigation of the embryology of the armadillo. He organised collections of fauna specimens through expeditions to the west coast of the US as well as Central America. Through these he managed to study over 150 species. Alongside his research he also undertook the task of lecturing zoology students at the university, earning himself the nickname "Dr. Pat" through his close ties to his students and what they described as his "friendly" and "helpful" attitude.

His first significant contribution was a problem proposed by Professor Charles Otis Whitman, titled 'the process of gastrulation in the pigeon's egg. Through his research he managed to prove the mechanism by which a pigeon's embryo will form.

He helped make many reforms to the course structure at the University of Texas, ensuring adequate training was given to undergraduates through the use of an integrated series. He also helped the university to form a department Library for Biology students. In 1928 Patterson was designated Director of Research in Zoology at the university.

When Muller managed to prove that X-rays cause mutations in Drosophila, Patterson shifted his focus towards the field of genetics and speciation. Patterson used the X-rays on larvae to prove that embryos mutate following irradiation. He published papers on the subject from the years of 1932 to 1935.

In 1937 he was appointed distinguished professor of zoology at the University of Texas, and the year after he was given an honorary D.Sc. by his alma mater College of Wooster.

He served as president of the American Society of Zoologists in 1939.

He was elected to the National Academy of Sciences in 1941 and made the vice president of the American Association for the Advancement of Science, Section F. In 1947 he received the Daniel Giraud Elliot Medal for his paper on isolation mechanisms and elected constitutional president of the International Society for the Study of Evolution.

In 1952 Patterson published, with coauthor Wilson S. Stone, his greatest work, entitled Evolution in the Genus Drosophila detailing geographic isolation's role in genetics.

In 1954 he was elected president of the Genetics Society of America.

He was very active in his research, publishing a total of 122 papers between the years of 1907 and 1954. Mostly in embryology and generics, with a few dealing with the topics of local fauna and Indian artifacts.
