= Barbara J. Meyer =

American biologist

- Born: 1949 (age 76–77)
- Education: Stanford University; Harvard University; University of California, Berkeley
- Spouse: Tom Cline
- Scientific career
- Workplaces: MIT; UC Berkeley; MRC Laboratory of Molecular Biology
- Academic advisors: Mark Ptashne, Sydney Brenner
- Notable students: Anne Villeneuve

Barbara Jean Meyer (born 1949) is a biologist and geneticist, noted for her pioneering research on lambda phage, a virus that infects bacteria; discovery of the master control gene involved in sex determination; and studies of gene regulation, particularly dosage compensation. Meyer's work has revealed mechanisms of sex determination and dosage compensation—that balance X-chromosome gene expression between the sexes in Caenorhabditis elegans that continue to serve as the foundation of diverse areas of study on chromosome structure and function today.

Dr. Meyer is an HHMI investigator, a genetics, genomics and development professor at UC Berkeley, and an adjunct professor in the biochemistry and biophysics department at University of California, San Francisco (UCSF)'s School of Medicine. Her current research focuses on the molecular networks controlling dynamic chromosome behaviors during cell development which endure genome stability.

== Biography ==
Meyer is a native Californian, born and raised in Stockton. Meyer completed her undergraduate BS at Stanford University, working with David Clayton. She began her PhD at the University of California, Berkeley and completed her graduate studies in 1979 at Harvard University in the lab of Mark Ptashne, working on gene regulation in lambda phage, a bacterial virus which infects bacteria E. coli. In 1979 Meyer began postdoctoral research at the MRC Laboratory of Molecular Biology, studying how chromosomes determine sex at the laboratory of Sydney Brenner, who later won a Nobel Prize for establishing the nematode worm Caenorhabditis elegans as an important model organism for research on development. Switching from virus to Caenorhabditis elegans (C. elegans), a roundworm, Meyer still studies gene regulation, but turning to sex determination. Meyer discovered the master gene involved in sex determination.

Meyer's early work focused on how C. elegans "counts" the number of X chromosomes and sets of autosomes to determine its sex, as well as how it adjusts to the imbalance in the number of X chromosomes between the two sexes. In C. elegans, individuals with two X chromosomes are self-fertilizing hermaphrodites; those with only one X chromosome are males. A popular hypothesis when Meyer began her postdoctoral work was that the worms compensate for the difference in the number of copies of genes on the X chromosome between the two sexes. But it wasn't clear whether the worms accomplished this by upregulating genes on the X chromosome in males or by downregulating genes on the X chromosome in hermaphrodites. Meyer established her first lab at MIT after leaving the MRC, starting with the question of how the nematode specifies its sex. Further analysis of the mechanism underlying dosage compensation produced many key insights into gene regulation.

In 1990, Meyer and her husband Tom Cline gave up their tenured positions (she at MIT, he at Princeton) -she accepted a full faculty appointment at the University of California, Berkeley. In 1997, Meyer becomes an HHMI investigator. Her lab identified a gene they named xol-1 as the master switch for sex determination. Meyer's group also found that transcription factors encoded by both the X chromosome and the autosomes battle to control whether xol-1 is transcriptionally active or inactive.

She became a member of ASCB (American association of cell biology) in 1995. She was also elected as a member to AAAS (American academy of Arts and Sciences) in 1995. In 2014, Meyer was elected to the American Philosophical Society.

In 2018, Meyer was honored with the E.B. Wilson Medal by American Society for Cell Biology's (ASCB) highest honor for science, for her significant and far-reaching contributions to cell biology over a lifetime in science. Meyer was also honored with 2018 Thomas Hunt Morgan Medal which is awarded for lifetime achievement in genetics. This honor is given in recognition of her groundbreaking work on chromosome behaviors that govern gene expression, development, and heredity. At the same year, Meyer was elected to the National Academy of Medicine, considered one of the highest honors in health and medicine, "for groundbreaking work on chromosome dynamics that impact gene expression, development and heredity using the nematode as a model organism.

== Notable papers ==
- McDonel, Patrick; Jans, Judith; Peterson, Brant K.; Meyer, Barbara J. (2006). "Clustered DNA motifs mark X chromosomes for repression by a dosage compensation complex". Nature. 444 (7119). Springer Science and Business Media LLC: 614–618. Bibcode:2006Natur.444..614M. doi:10.1038/nature05338. ISSN 0028-0836. PMC 2693371. PMID 17122774.
- Chu, Diana S.; Liu, Hongbin; Nix, Paola; Wu, Tammy F.; Ralston, Edward J.; Yates III, John R.; Meyer, Barbara J. (August 30, 2006). "Sperm chromatin proteomics identifies evolutionarily conserved fertility factors". Nature. 443 (7107). Springer Science and Business Media LLC: 101–105. Bibcode:2006Natur.443..101C. doi:10.1038/nature05050. ISSN 0028-0836. PMC 2731558. PMID 16943775.
- Cline and, Thomas W.; Meyer, Barbara J. (1996). "VIVE LA DIFFÉRENCE:Males vs Females in Flies vs Worms". Annual Review of Genetics. 30 (1). Annual Reviews: 637–702. doi:10.1146/annurev.genet.30.1.637. ISSN 0066-4197. PMID 8982468.
- Meyer, B. J.; Kleid, D. G.; Ptashne, M. (December 1, 1975). "Lambda repressor turns off transcription of its own gene". Proceedings of the National Academy of Sciences. 72 (12): 4785–4789. Bibcode:1975PNAS...72.4785M. doi:10.1073/pnas.72.12.4785. ISSN 0027-8424. PMC 388816. PMID 1061069.
- Meyer, Barbara J. (2018). "Sex and death: from cell fate specification to dynamic control of X-chromosome structure and gene expression". Molecular Biology of the Cell. 29 (22). American Society for Cell Biology (ASCB): 2616–2621. doi:10.1091/mbc.e18-06-0397. ISSN 1059-1524. PMC 6249838. PMID 30376434.
- Yang Q, Lo TW, Brejc K, Schartner C, Ralston EJ, Lapidus DM, Meyer BJ. X-chromosome target specificity diverged between dosage compensation mechanisms of two closely related Caenorhabditis species. Elife. 12. PMID 36951246 DOI: 10.7554/eLife.85413

== Awards ==
- 1995 Elected Member, American Academy of Arts and Sciences
- 2000 – Member, National Academy of Sciences
- 2010 – Genetics Society of America Medal
- Elected Member, American Academy of Microbiology
- 2013 selected Miller Senior Fellow of the Miller Institute at the University of California Berkeley
- 2017 Francis Amory Prize in Medicine and Physiology from the American Academy of Arts and Sciences
- 2018 Thomas Hunt Morgan Medal awarded for lifetime achievement in genetics "in recognition of her groundbreaking work on chromosome behaviors that govern gene expression, development, and heredity."
- 2018 E.B. Wilson Medal from the American Society for Cell Biology, (ASCB) highest honor for science
- 2018 Elected to the National Academy of Medicine
