= Elof Axel Carlson =

American geneticist (1931–2025)

- Born: 1931; New York City, U.S.
- Died: December 17, 2025 (aged 94); Vancouver, Washington, U.S.
- Scientific career
- Fields: Genetics
- Workplaces: Queen's University (Canada); University of California, Los Angeles; State University of New York at Stony Brook
- Doctoral advisor: Hermann Joseph Muller

Elof Axel Carlson (1931 – December 17, 2025) was an American geneticist who was a distinguished teaching professor emeritus at State University of New York at Stony Brook, as well as being a historian of science. Carlson earned his B.A. in 1953 from New York University, and his PhD in 1958 in zoology from Indiana University Bloomington under the mentorship of Hermann Joseph Muller. Carlson was a past recipient of the E. Harris Harbison Award for excellence in teaching given by the Danforth Foundation.

Carlson was a visiting professor at the University of Minnesota, San Diego State University, and Tougaloo College. He was also a McMurrin Visiting Professor at the University of Utah. He also taught on several voyages of Semester at Sea.

Carlson died in Vancouver, Washington, on December 17, 2025, at the age of 94.

== Bibliography ==
- The Gene: a Critical History (1989) ISBN 978-0-8138-1406-3
- Genes, Radiation, and Society. The Life and Work of H. J. Muller (Cornell Univ. Press, 1981)
- The Unfit: A history of a bad idea (2001) ISBN 978-0-87969-587-3
- Mendel's Legacy: The origin of classical genetics (2004) ISBN 978-0-87969-675-7
- Times of Triumph, Times of Doubt: Science And the Battle for Public Trust (2006) ISBN 978-0-87969-805-8
- Neither Gods Nor Beasts: How Science is changing who we think we are (2008) ISBN 978-0-87969-786-0
- Mutation: The History of an Idea from Darwin to Genomics (2011) ISBN 978-1-936113-30-9
- The 7 Sexes: Biology of Sex Determination (2013) ISBN 9780253006455 (cl: alk. paper); ISBN 9780253006547 (eb)
- How Scientific Progress Occurs Incrementalism and the Life Sciences (2018) ISBN 9781621822974 (hardcover)
- How to Construct your Intellectual Pedigree A History of Mentoring in Science (2021) ISBN 9789811215827 (hardcover)
- What Is Science A Guide for Those Who Love It, Hate It, or Fear It (2021) ISBN 9789811228711 (hardcover)

=== Scholarly works co-written ===
Demerec, M., Kaufmann, B. P., & Carlson, E. A. (1986). Drosophila guide: introduction to the genetics and cytology of Drosophila melanogaster. Washington, D.C.: Carnegie Institute of Washington.
