= F. W. Bateson =

English literary scholar and critic

Frederick (Noel) Wilse Bateson (1901 – 1978) was an English literary scholar and critic.

== Life ==
Bateson was born in Cheshire, and educated at Charterhouse and at Trinity College, Oxford, where he took a BA in English (second class), and then the B.Litt., which he completed in 1927. From 1927 to 1929 he held a Commonwealth Fund Fellowship at Harvard, and from 1929 to 1940 he worked in England, editing the Cambridge Bibliography of English Literature, and occasionally lecturing for the Workers Educational Association (WEA). During the Second World War he worked as a statistical officer for the Buckinghamshire War Agricultural Executive.

He is best remembered for his work of the post-war years. In 1951, together with William Wallace Robson, he founded the Oxford journal Essays in Criticism. He edited it until 1972, when he entrusted the editorship to Stephen Wall and Christopher Ricks. Bateson was sceptical of 'scientific' approaches to literary criticism, and of historicist approaches.

He became a fellow of Corpus Christi College in 1963, and was made an Emeritus Fellow on his retirement. In 1931 he married Jan Cancellor; they had two children, a son and a daughter. He died on 16 October 1978.

Bateson is often mis-quoted as having asked the following rhetorical question:

If the Mona Lisa is in the Louvre, where are Hamlet and "Lycidas"?

The question is a paraphrase by James McLaverty of Bateson's comparison between the spatial presence of the Mona Lisa and the temporal experience of Hamlet and Lycidas. He is noted also for his 1959 essay The English School in a Democracy. He is commemorated in Oxford by the annual Bateson lecture, which is published in Essays in Criticism.

== Works ==
- Oxford Poetry (1923) editor
- English Comic Drama 1700-1750 (1929)
- Works of Congreve (1930) editor
- The Cambridge Bibliography of English Literature (1941) five volumes, to 1957
- Towards a Socialist Agriculture (1946) Fabian studies, editor
- English Poetry: A Critical Introduction (1950)
- Twickenham edition of Alexander Pope, Vol. 3.2, Epistles to Several Persons (Moral Essays) (1951) editor
- Wordsworth: A Re-Interpretation (1954)
- English poetry and the English Language (1961)
- A Guide to English Literature (1963)
- A Guide to English and American Literature (1970) with Harrison T. Meserole
- The scholar-critic: An introduction to literary research (1972)
- Essays in Critical Dissent (1972)
- The School for Scandal (1979) editor

== Notes ==
- Essays in Criticism XXIX (1979) Bateson volume
- "Mr F. W. Bateson" (obituary), The Times, 18 Oct. 1978.
