= Wilson Stone (scientist) =

American scientist

- Born: 1907; Junction, Texas
- Died: 1968 (aged 60–61)
- Scientific career
- Fields: Genetics
- Workplaces: University of Texas
- Doctoral advisor: Hermann Joseph Muller

Wilson Stuart Stone (October 6, 1907 – February 28, 1968) was an American geneticist and zoologist. Stone received his bachelor, Masters and PhD at the University of Texas and joined the department of zoology in 1932. Stone mentors were J. T. Patterson, H.J. Muller, and Theophilus Painter. Stone's work was primarily in radiation genetics, drosophila speciation, and population genetics. In 1946 along with Wyss and Hass demonstrated the indirect of effects of ultraviolet radiation causing mutations in bacteria.

- Helped found the genetics foundation at University of Texas in 1952
- Chairman of the department of zoology at University of Texas (1959–1963)
- Was vice-Chancellor of the university system
- Consultant for Atomic Energy Commission
- Elected to National Academy of Sciences (1960)
- Co-editor of Genetics (1957–1963)
- Associate editor of Radiation Research (1960–1963)
- Secretary of American Society of Naturalists (1947–1949)

== In Memoriam awards ==
Wilson S. Stone Memorial Award was created in 1971 to recognize young researchers who have made outstanding contributions to biomedical sciences in the United States and presented at the annual Symposium on Fundamental Cancer Research sponsored by The University of Texas M. D. Anderson Cancer Center.
