= Abby Dernburg =

American biologist

- Education: University of California, Berkeley, BA; University of California, San Francisco, PhD
- Spouse: Gary Karpen
- Scientific career
- Fields: Cell biology, Genetics
- Workplaces: University of California, Berkeley; Lawrence Berkeley National Laboratory; Howard Hughes Medical Institute
- Academic advisors: Clayton Heathcock; Dan Koshland; John Sedat; Anne Villeneuve
- Website: Research website

Abby F. Dernburg is a professor of molecular and cell biology at the University of California, Berkeley, an Investigator of the Howard Hughes Medical Institute, a Faculty Senior Scientist at Lawrence Berkeley National Laboratory and one of two professors at UC Berkeley who was recognized into The National Academy of Sciences.. She is the principal investigator of The Dernburg Lab, specializing in cell reproduction studies.

Abby F. Dernburg was elected to the National Academy of Sciences, alongside Professor Ramamoorthy Ramesh, bringing the total number of active members to 2,617. In 2025, Dernburg was also elected into the American Association for the Advancement of Science (AAAS) within the Biosciences Area along with her fellow scientist Blake Simmons. Dernburg's research examines how chromosomes pair with their corresponding partners and exchange genetic material during meiosis, helping explain how chromosomes are properly separated during reproductive cell division. She developed three dimensional DNA analysis imaging methods.

== Education and early career ==
Dernburg received her Bachelor of Arts in Biochemistry in 1987 from the University of California, Berkeley. After earning her bachelor’s degree in biochemistry from UC Berkeley in 1987, Dernburg went on to earn her Ph.D. in biochemistry and biophysics from the University of California, San Francisco, in 1996. She later completed postdoctoral research at Stanford University School of Medicine. She began working in the lab in 2001. There, she worked in an organic chemistry lab before she joined Dan Koshland's laboratory, studying bacterial chemotaxis, or how cells and organisms move in response to a chemical stimulus. Following graduation, she spent a year working as a research technician in Koshland's lab, where she co-authored a study analyzing the structure of a bacterial sensory receptor.

Growing up, Professor Dernburg was always interested in the microscopic worlds but found early science toys a little frustrating. The first exciting experience she remembers is bringing Lily of the Valley from her yard at home into a high school biology lab to look at under the microscope. She then began her career in the biological processes of meiosis. Dernburg then entered the Tetrad Program at the University of California, San Francisco for her doctoral work. She received her PhD in 1996 working in the laboratory of John Sedat studying several aspects of chromosomes organization and function. She developed fluorescence in situ hybridization (FISH) methods to study the genetic content of cells and to investigate how chromosomes are organized within cell nuclei. Using these tools she investigated how chromosome organization within the nucleus can affect transcription, and how chromosomes interact to separate from each during the process of meiosis, using the fly Drosophila as a model organism. The University of California Berkley says, "Meiosis creates a genetic diversity and make sexual reproduction possible, however, there can be many consequences such as, infertility, pregnancy loss, and chromosomal conditions." Specifically, she used FISH to monitor the chromosomal position of regions of heterochromatin—a tightly packed region of DNA associated with non-expressed genes—and of a fly gene called brown, which codes for the red pigment that gives the flies their red eyes; when the brown gene is turned off, flies have brown eyes. Heterochromatic regions of chromosomes tend to associate together in a specific compartment of the nucleus. Dernburg found that when a region of heterochromatin was inserted near the brown gene, the gene would associate with a heterochromatic region of the nucleus and would thus be inactivated, giving flies with this insertion brown eyes. The study demonstrated the effect of chromosomal positioning on gene expression. Dernburg also studied the role heterochromatin plays in chromosome segregation during meiosis, finding that the heterochromatic regions of homologous chromosomes remain associated with one another until metaphase I, or the stage at which chromosomes line up along the center of the nucleus prior to the first round of meiotic division. This association ensures that the resulting daughter cells have the appropriate number of chromosomes. She completed her dissertation, called Nuclear Architecture in Drosophila melanogaster, documenting this work in 1996. Her thesis received the Larry Sandler Memorial Award in 1997 from the Genetics Society of America, which recognizes the most outstanding dissertation in the area of Drosophila genetics and biology.

For her postdoctoral research, Dernburg joined the laboratory of Anne Villeneuve at Stanford University, where she transitioned to working on the nematode worm Caenorhabditis elegans. There, focused on the process of meiosis, which she continues to study in her own lab, she adapted FISH methods to study the cytology of chromosome pairing in the worm. In 1998, she published a study documenting how meiosis in the worm is distinct from meiosis in many other eukaryotic organisms. In most eukaryotes, double-strand breaks in the DNA are required for pairing and synapsis between homologous chromosomes during meiosis. Especially in 2005, she discovered a "synapsis checkpoint", altogether this showed that egg cells will die if chomosomes fail to properly synapsis during meiosis. Dernburg found that in Caenorhabditis elegans, double-strand breaks are required for recombination and for chromosome segregation during meiosis, but not for homologous pairing and synapsis. The finding suggested that there may be more diversity in meiotic mechanisms than was previously expected.

== Research ==
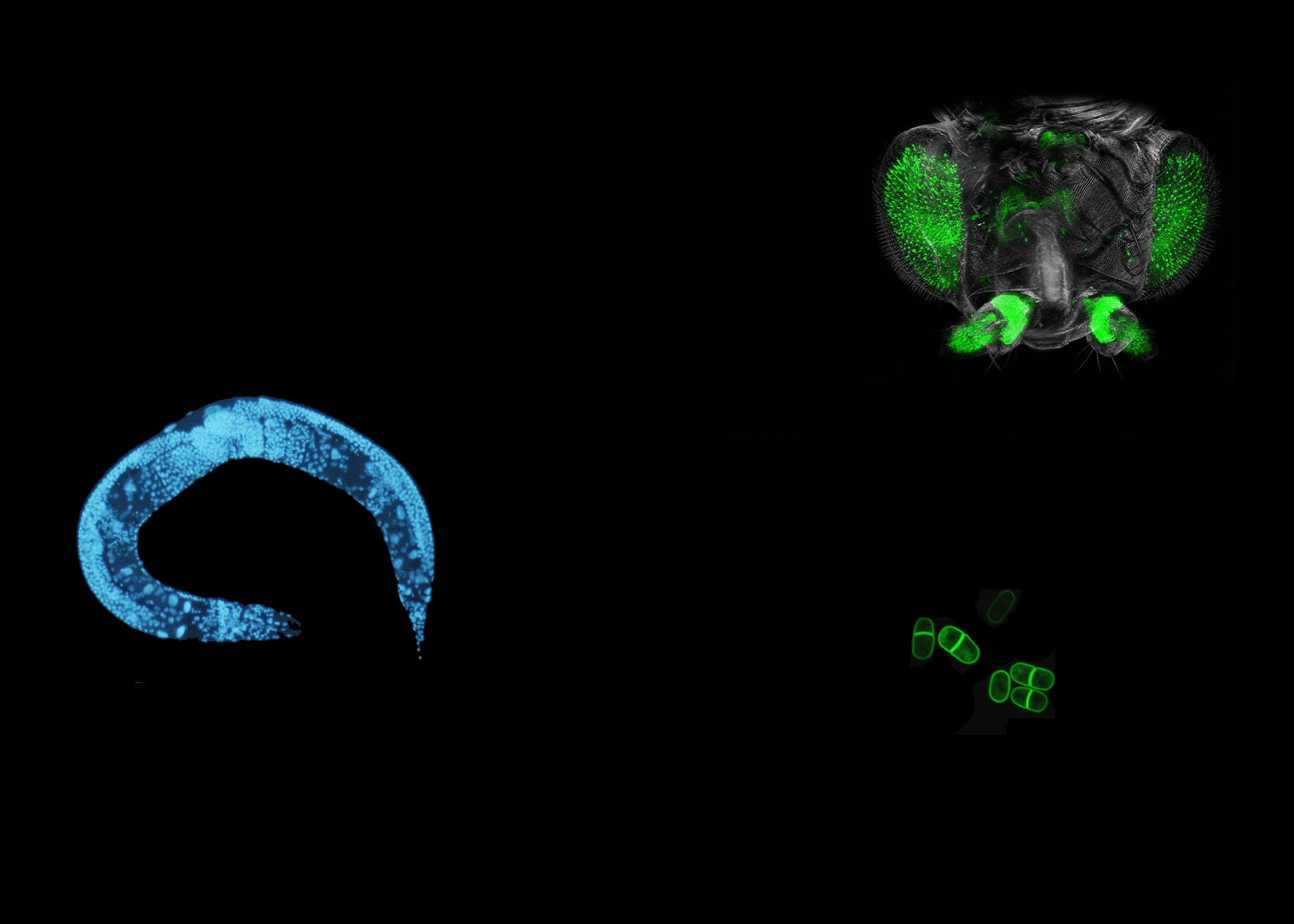
C. elegans Fluorescent Dye Meiosis and Reproduction Research

The laboratory combines genetics, genome editing, live cell imaging in addition to biophysics to study the behavior of chromosomes. The transparent nematode C. elegans enables researchers to observe the movement of chromosomes, allowing them to investigate how the reproductive cells detect errors during meiosis.

In 2000, Dernburg started up her laboratory at Lawrence Berkeley National Laboratory and the University of California, Berkeley to continue investigating chromosome organization and dynamics, focusing on meiosis using the nematode worm Caenorhabditis elegans as a model organism. She used fluorescent dyes to understand the mechanisms of meiosis that allow C. elegans to reproduce. Her laboratory has contributed to the community's understanding of how chromosomes find and pair with the appropriate homolog during meiosis, which is essential for proper chromosome segregation and ensuring the appropriate chromosome copy number in daughter cells. Abby is an expert at chromosome structure, cell cycle controls and many other scientific findings which intrigue her. During the 2024-2025 academic year, Dernberg served as chair of the University of California, Berkeley's Committee on Research.

In 2009, Dernburg and her colleagues reported that the cell's cytoskeleton helps chromosomes find and pair with their matching partners during meiosis. Their research, which studied the nematode worm Caenorhabditis elegans, showed how chromosome attachment sites connect to the cytoskeleton, allowing chromosomes to move around the nucleus. The study also identified a checkpoint that helps ensure chromosomes are correctly paired before the next stages of meiosis.

Abby Dernburg
- Education: University of California, Berkeley, BA; University of California, San Francisco, PhD
- Spouse: Gary Karpen
- Scientific career
- Fields: Cell biology, Genetics
- Workplaces: University of California, Berkeley; Lawrence Berkeley National Laboratory; Howard Hughes Medical Institute
- Academic advisors: Clayton Heathcock; Dan Koshland; John Sedat; Anne Villeneuve
- Website: Research website

Her group includes Rui Jiang, a postdoctoral doctor, Yerkezhan Toleukhan, an undergraduate intern, and Gustavo Flores, a volunteer. This group has worked to understand how special regions of chromosomes, known as pairing centers, promote homologous chromosome pairing, synapsis, and segregation in the worm. In 2005, they published a study demonstrating how pairing centers perform two separable functions during meiosis. First, they facilitate pairing through stabilizing an intermediate complex involved in the pairing process. Second, pairing centers promote the formation of a synaptonemal complex, in which a protein polymer acts as a scaffold to hold homologous chromosomes together during recombination. In a related study, her group also uncovered a conserved meiotic checkpoint that acts during meiosis to recognize unpaired/unsynapsed chromosomes. Cells identified as having unsynapsed chromosomes undergo apoptosis, or programmed cell death, to guard against the formation of sex cells with the wrong number of chromosomes.

Dernburg's group also discovered that the functions of pairing centers depend on a family of four DNA-binding zinc-finger proteins—called HIM or ZIM proteins—that recognize and bind short, repetitive sequences that are hallmarks of pairing centers. Each him or zim protein recognizes a particular pairing center sequence to help bring homologous chromosomes together. Dernburg's group first uncovered the him-8 gene, which encodes a protein responsible for proper meiotic separation of the worm's X chromosome. These proteins facilitate an interaction between the pairing centers and a complex of microtubules and a motor protein called dynein which allow chromosomes to move along the nuclear envelope until they encounter their partner.

Dernburg has also moved beyond the nematode worm to begin to study meiotic mechanisms in planarians, which are non-parasitic flatworms, as well as another species of nematode called Pristionchus pacificus to understand how meiotic mechanisms are conserved—or diverge—across species.

The Dernburg lab also develops methods for microscopy of living nematodes. Using live cell imaging, they discovered that the synaptonemal complex, the special structure that holds together homologous chromosomes and enables them to undergo meiotic recombination, is a liquid crystal in which recombination nodules, protein assemblies that promote crossover formation, are condensed via protein translocation to underlie crossover patterning. This has led them to propose a mechanism for crossover interference based on a reaction–diffusion mechanism. Dernburg is currently researching how meisos can impact or prevent chromosomal birth defects.

In 2008, Dernburg became a Howard Hughes Medical Institute Investigator. She also has a joint appointment as a Faculty Senior Scientist at Lawrence Berkeley National Laboratory.

Dernburg is currently researching the quality control and regulation of the crossing over of chromosomes during oogenesis at the University of California Berkeley.

Her research and expertise are in the fields of chromosome structure and function, higher order chromosome structure, cell cycle controls, chromosome remodeling and reorganization during meiosis, spatial pattern formation in eukaryotic and prokaryotic cells, genome mapping, eukaryotic genomes, and whole-genome analysis. Dernburg believes there are still a list of unknowns in her field. In March 2025, Dernburg helped organize a Stand Up for Science rally in San Francisco. She was one of 1,900 scientists who signed a letter condemning the Trump Administration for cutting science funding and censorship.

== Awards and honors ==
- Larry Sandler Memorial Award, 1997
- Presidential Early Career Award for Scientists and Engineers, National Institutes of Health, 2002
- Early Career Life Scientist Award, 2007
- Edward Novitski Prize, Genetics Society of America, 2011
- Fellow, American Society for Cell Biology, 2017
- Elected into the National Academy of Sciences, 2024
- Fellow, American Association for the Advancement of Science, 2025
- In 2016, Abby Dernburg was named the recipient of the Grimwade Medal by the University of Melbourne.
