= Herbert J. Muller =

American historian (1905–1980)

- Born: July 7, 1905
- Died: January 27, 1980 (aged 74)

Academic background
- Education: Cornell University

Academic work
- Discipline: History

Herbert J. Muller (July 7, 1905 – January 27, 1980) was an American historian, academic, government official and writer. He received his education at Cornell University. He taught at Cornell, Purdue, and Indiana universities (1959–1980), served in the Department of State and on the War Production Board, and frequently lectured abroad.

He was the author of The Uses of the Past, an inquiry into the lessons of history, focusing on Rome and Greece, Christianity and Judaism, the Byzantine empire, the Middle Ages, and Russia and China.

Muller attended the 1966 Dartmouth Literacy Conference which brought together around 50 English teachers from the UK, USA and Canada. He subsequently wrote the US report of the conference The Uses of English.

In 1973 Muller was one of the signers of the Humanist Manifesto II.

Muller's grandfather Otto Muller was the younger brother of Hermann J. Muller, the father of the American geneticist Hermann Joseph Muller Jr., and of Johanna Muller, the mother of the anthropologist Alfred Kroeber and grandmother of the writer Ursula K. Le Guin. His great-grandfather Nicholas Muller came to the United States from Germany in 1848 and with his brother Karl founded the Muller Art Metal Works. Herbert Muller had two sons, Richard and John.

== Publications ==
- Freedom in the Modern World, Harper & Row, 1966.
- Freedom in the Western World: From the Dark Ages to the Rise of Democracy, Harper Colophon Books, 1964.
- The Children of Frankenstein: a Primer on Modern Technology and Human Values, Indiana University Press, 1970. ISBN 0-253-11175-7
- Science and Criticism: The Humanistic Tradition in Contemporary Thought, Yale University Press, 1943.
- The Loom of History, Mentor-Omega/NAL, New York, 1961
- Religion and Freedom in the Modern World, University of Chicago Press, 1963
- The Uses of the Past: Profiles of Former Societies, Oxford University Press, 1952, reissued by Textbook Publishers, 2003. ISBN 0-7581-6914-0
- Freedom in the Ancient World, Harper & Row, 1961
- Adlai Stevenson: A Study in Values, Harper & Row, 1967
- The Uses of English, Holt, Rinehart, and Winston, 1967
- The Spirit of Tragedy, Alfred A Knopf, 1956
