= James F. Crow =

American geneticist (1916–2012)

James F. Crow ForMemRS
- Crow in 2009
- Born: James Franklin Crow; January 18, 1916; Phoenixville, Pennsylvania
- Died: January 4, 2012 (aged 95); Madison, Wisconsin
- Education: Friends University, Wichita
- Spouse: Ann Crockett (m. 1941; died 2001)
- Awards: Thomas Hunt Morgan Medal (1987)
- Scientific career
- Fields: Genetics
- Workplaces: University of Wisconsin–Madison

James Franklin Crow (January 18, 1916 – January 4, 2012) was Professor Emeritus of Genetics at the University of Wisconsin–Madison and a population geneticist whose career spanned from the modern synthesis to the genomic era.

Some of his most significant peer-reviewed contributions were coauthored with Motoo Kimura, including those leading to the neutral theory of molecular evolution. He also wrote an influential introductory textbook on genetics and a more advanced one with Kimura. His graduate and undergraduate students and postdocs includes Alexey Kondrashov, James Bull, Joe Felsenstein, Russell Lande, Dan Hartl, and Wen-Hsiung Li.

He was a president of both the Genetics Society of America and the American Society of Human Genetics. He was a member of the National Academy of Sciences, The American Philosophical Society, the World Academy of Art and Science, the National Academy of Medicine, the American Academy of Arts and Sciences, and Foreign Member of the Royal Society (ForMemRS).

== Biography ==
=== Early life and education ===
Crow was born in 1916 in Phoenixville, Pennsylvania, where his father was a teacher at Ursinus College. The family moved to Wichita, Kansas, two and a half years later, in 1918, where Crow was part of the 1918 flu pandemic. He went to school in Wichita, then to Friends University, at the time a Quaker school, also in Wichita, graduating in 1937.

At school, he enjoyed physics and chemistry, but pursued chemistry more strongly at university. He picked up biology as well, and double majored in chemistry and biology. A genetics course in his junior year was his first exposure to that field, even though the syllabus omitted the modern synthesis.

Delaying the decision of whether to become a biologist or chemist, Crow applied for graduate fellowships in both biology and biochemistry. He took up the first positive reply, a position with H. J. Muller at the University of Texas at Austin, in spite of knowing that Muller was in Russia at the time. It turned out that Muller had no intention of returning to his position in Texas, and so J. T. Patterson became Crow's supervisor there. Under the influence of Muller, Patterson was starting to switch to Drosophila genetics, having previously worked on the embryology of the armadillo, and so it was that Crow came to study the genetic isolating mechanisms in the Drosophila mulleri group. This included a combination of doing mating crosses between species and looking for chromosome rearrangements using polytene chromosomes. (Polytene chromosomes are large aggregations of actual chromosomes which, once appropriately stained, facilitate the discovery of chromosome rearrangements through an ordinary light microscope. Polytene chromosomes are mostly found in the salivary glands of some species.) In his studies of pre-mating isolation, Crow was one of the first to study genetic reinforcement, and also observed that species occurring together were sexually isolated, while those living apart were not.

A great influence on Crow at the time was W.S. Stone, who encouraged him to learn more mathematics, while he himself knew none. Later on, Crow admitted to struggling with some of the advanced maths and physics courses he took as a result, but also said they had been rewarding.

=== Dartmouth College and the war ===
Crow graduated with his PhD in genetics from the University of Texas in 1941 and moved to Dartmouth College just prior to the American entry into World War II, where he remained until 1948. The original plan had been to get a postdoctoral fellowship to work with Sewall Wright at the University of Chicago, but this proved difficult just at the start of the war.

His appointment in Dartmouth was to teach genetics and general zoology, but as faculty were drafted off into military endeavors, Crow took on an increasing number of courses. Crow particularly delighted in being able to teach embryology and comparative anatomy. When it seemed likely that he himself would be drafted, Crow took a course in navigation, at which, owing to his mathematical training, he proved so adept that he was asked to teach it. As parasitology became relevant to the war (as it did on the opposing front, where Willi Hennig was active in this area), he was asked to also teach parasitology and haematology. Not long after, he was also teaching statistics. It may be that, having to teach many hours each day, Crow discovered his love for teaching at this point. He later recounted that there were several students all of whose courses were taught by him.

He, like many of his colleagues of the era, had college-time involvement with pacifist groups that had communist leanings. During WWII, he tried to enlist, but was deferred until the end due to his teaching commitments.

=== Race and IQ controversy ===
Crow wrote "Genetic Theories and Influences: Comments on the Value of Diversity," an article in the Harvard Educational Review reprinted in the review's reprint series responding to Arthur Jensen's 1969 article, "How Much Can We Boost IQ and Academic Achievement?"

=== Paternal age effect on DNA ===
Crow also did research and writing in how DNA in sperm degrades as men age, through repeated copying, and can then be passed along to children in permanently degraded form, which they likely then pass on as well. As a result, he said in 1997 that the "greatest mutational health hazard to the human genome is fertile older males". He described mutations that have a direct visible effect on the child's health and also mutations that can be latent or have minor visible effects on the child's health; many such mutations allow the child to reproduce, but cause more serious problems for grandchildren, great-grandchildren and later generations A 2009 review prematurely concluded that the absolute risk from paternal age for genetic anomalies in offspring was low, and stated that "there is no clear association between adverse health outcome and paternal age but longitudinal studies are needed."

However, newer studies supported Crow's claims. A study in 2006 of 132,000 Israeli adolescents discovered men in their 30s are 1.6 times as likely to have a child with autism as men under 30, with men in their 40s having a sixfold increase in risk Further studies in Sweden (2.6 million children), Denmark (2.98 million), and an international dataset of 5.7 million children showed a definite link between increased paternal age and autism risk. A widely-referenced Icelandic whole-genome sequencing effort led by Kári Stefánsson of DEcode Genetics and published in Nature also concluded similarly.

== Research ==
Much of Crow’s research was in the area of theoretical population genetics, but he has often ventured into the laboratory. Over a career that spanned more than 50 years, Crow and his collaborators studied a variety of traits in Drosophila, dissected the genetics of DDT resistance, measured the effects of minor mutations on the overall fitness of populations, described the behavior of mutations that do not play the selection game by Darwin’s rules, and investigated many other subjects. His theoretical work has touched virtually every important subject in population genetics. Crow developed the concept of genetic load, has contributed to the theory of random drift in small populations, has studied the effects of non-random mating and age-structured populations, and has considered the question, “What good is sex?” He also developed ways to estimate inbreeding in human populations by making use of the way in which surnames are “inherited,” and was a world expert on the genetic effects of low level ionizing radiation. In addition to his many research publications, Crow published many reviews and appreciations of the work of his colleagues. His textbook/monograph on population genetics, written with Motoo Kimura, has had a notable impact on its field.

== Public service ==
Crow chaired the Department of Medical Genetics for five years and the Laboratory of Genetics (Genetics plus Medical Genetics) at the University of Wisconsin for a total of eight years. He also served as Acting Dean of the UW Medical School for 2 years. He was President of the Genetics Society of America and the American Society of Human Genetics. He was the co-editor-in-chief of the journal GENETICS and edited its perspectives section from 1987 until 2008. Crow served at the national level as a member of the General Advisory Committee to the Director of NIH and of the executive council of the National Committee on Radiation Protection, chaired the NIH Genetics Study Section and the NIH Mammalian Genetics Study Section, and chaired several committees for the National Academy of Sciences including a committee to study forensic uses of DNA fingerprinting.

In addition, Crow played viola for the Madison Symphony Orchestra from 1949 to 1994 and served as President of the Madison Civic Music Society and of the Madison Symphony Orchestra. He led a fund-raising drive to establish an endowment for the Pro Arte String Quartet.

Crow was a member of the National Academy of Sciences, the National Academy of Medicine, The American Philosophical Society, the American Academy of Arts and Sciences, the World Academy of Art and Science. He was an honorary Fellow of the Japan Academy and a Fellow of the Wisconsin Academy of Sciences, Arts, and Letters.

== Personal life ==
Crow married Ann Crockett in 1941 after his graduation. They were survived by a son, the computer scientist Franklin C. Crow; two daughters, Laura and Catherine; six grandchildren and two great-grandchildren. He was an atheist and an opponent of the intelligent design movement.

== Death ==
Crow died on January 4, 2012, at age 95 from congestive heart failure at his home in Madison, Wisconsin.

== Selected publications ==
- Crow, J. F. (2010). "Wright and Fisher on Inbreeding and Random Drift". Genetics. 184 (3): 609–611. doi:10.1534/genetics.109.110023. PMC 2845331. PMID 20332416.
- Crow, J. F. (2010). "On epistasis: Why it is unimportant in polygenic directional selection". Philosophical Transactions of the Royal Society B: Biological Sciences. 365 (1544): 1241–1244. doi:10.1098/rstb.2009.0275. PMC 2871814. PMID 20308099.
- Crow, J. F. (2009). "Mayr, mathematics and the study of evolution". Journal of Biology. 8 (2): 13. doi:10.1186/jbiol117. PMC 2687772. PMID 19291256.
- Crow, J. F. (2008). "Maintaining evolvability". Journal of Genetics. 87 (4): 349–353. doi:10.1007/s12041-008-0057-8. PMID 19147924. S2CID 23226333.
- Crow, J. F. (2008). "Just and Unjust: E. E. Just (1883-1941)". Genetics. 179 (4): 1735–1740. doi:10.1534/genetics.104.94094. PMC 2516054. PMID 18711217.
- Crow, J. F. (2008). "Mid-Century Controversies in Population Genetics". Annual Review of Genetics. 42: 1–16. doi:10.1146/annurev.genet.42.110807.091612. PMID 18652542.
- Crow, J. F. (2008). "Commentary: Haldane and beanbag genetics". International Journal of Epidemiology. 37 (3): 442–445. doi:10.1093/ije/dyn048. PMID 18522983.
- Crow, J. F. (2007). "Haldane, Bailey, Taylor and recombinant-inbred lines". Genetics. 176 (2): 729–732. doi:10.1093/genetics/176.2.729. PMC 1894602. PMID 17579238.
- Gulisija, D.; Crow, J. F. (2007). "Inferring Purging from Pedigree Data". Evolution. 61 (5): 1043–1051. doi:10.1111/j.1558-5646.2007.00088.x. PMID 17492959. S2CID 24302475.
- Crow, J. F.; Lindsley, D.; Lucchesi, J. (2006). "Edward Novitski: Drosophila Virtuoso". Genetics. 174 (2): 549–553. doi:10.1534/genetics.104.65953. PMC 1602066. PMID 17068121.
- Crow, J. F. (2006). "H. J. Muller and the "competition hoax"". Genetics. 173 (2): 511–514. doi:10.1093/genetics/173.2.511. PMC 1526522. PMID 16790582.
- Crow, J.F. 2006. Motoo Kimura, 1924-1994. Handbook of Philosophy of Biology.
- Crow, J.F. 2006. Sewall Wright, 1889-1988. Handbook of Philosophy of Biology.
- Crow, J. F. (2005). "Hermann Joseph Muller, Evolutionist". Nature Reviews Genetics. 6 (12): 941–945. doi:10.1038/nrg1728. PMID 16341074. S2CID 11619015.
- Crow, J. F. (2006). "Age and sex effects on human mutation rates: An old problem with new complexities". Journal of Radiation Research. 47 Suppl B: B75–B82. Bibcode:2006JRadR..47B..75C. doi:10.1269/jrr.47.b75. PMID 17019055.
- Crow, J. F.; Bender, W. (2004). "Edward B. Lewis, 1918-2004". Genetics. 168 (4): 1773–1783. doi:10.1093/genetics/168.4.1773. PMC 1448758. PMID 15611154.
- Crow, J.F. 2004. Assessing population subdivision. In Evolutionary Theory and Processes: Modern Horizons. Ed. by S.P. Wasser. pp. 35–42. Kluwer Academic Publishers.
- Crow, J. F. (2003). "Was there life before 1953?". Nature Genetics. 33 (4): 449–450. doi:10.1038/ng0403-449. PMID 12665867. S2CID 32010693.
- Garcia-Dorado, A.; Caballero, A.; Crow, J. F. (2003). "On the Persistence and Pervasiveness of a New Mutation". Evolution. 57 (11): 2644–2646. doi:10.1111/j.0014-3820.2003.tb01507.x. PMID 14686539. S2CID 23262143.
- Crow, J. F. 2002. Unequal by nature: a geneticist’s perspective on human differences. Dedalus Winter 2002:81-88.
- Crow, J.F.; Motoo Kimura. (1970). An introduction to population genetics theory ([Reprint] ed.). New Jersey: Blackburn Press. ISBN 978-1-932846-126.
- Crow, James F.; Kimura, Motoo (1965). "Evolution in Sexual and Asexual Populations". The American Naturalist. 99 (909): 439–450. Bibcode:1965ANat...99..439C. doi:10.1086/282389. ISSN 0003-0147. JSTOR 2459132. S2CID 84226196.
- Kimura, M.; Crow, J. F. (1964). "The Number of Alleles That Can Be Maintained in a Finite Population". Genetics. 49 (4): 725–738. doi:10.1093/genetics/49.4.725. PMC 1210609. PMID 14156929.
- Kimura, Motoo; Crow, James F. (1963). "The Measurement of Effective Population Number". Evolution. 17 (3): 279–288. doi:10.1111/j.1558-5646.1963.tb03281.x. ISSN 1558-5646. S2CID 86682954.
- Morton, N. E.; Crow, J. F.; Muller, H. J. (1956). "An Estimate of the Mutational Damage in Man from Data on Consanguineous Marriages". Proceedings of the National Academy of Sciences. 42 (11): 855–863. Bibcode:1956PNAS...42..855M. doi:10.1073/pnas.42.11.855. ISSN 0027-8424. PMC 528351. PMID 16589958.
