= William Wallace Robson =

British literary critic

William Wallace Robson FRSE FRSA (20 June 1923 – 31 July 1993) was a British literary critic and scholar.

== Life ==
He was born in Plymouth on 20 June 1923 the son of Kathleen Ryan and her husband, William Robson, a barrister. He was educated at Leeds Modern School.

He studied literature at the University of Oxford, graduating with a BA. In 1946 he began lecturing in English literature, and in 1948 was elected a Fellow and gained an MA. In the early 1950s he founded the Oxford journal Essays in Criticism with F. W. Bateson.

Robson gave the 1957 Chatterton Lecture on Poetry. In 1970 he received a chair in English at the University of Sussex, and in 1972 moved to a similar position at the University of Edinburgh.

In 1988 he was elected a Fellow of the Royal Society of Edinburgh. His proposers were Norman Jeffares, Donald Low, Archie Turnbull, and John McIntyre.

He retired in 1990 and died in Edinburgh on 31 July 1993.

== Family ==
In 1962 he married Anne-Varna Moses, and together they had two sons.

== Publications ==
- Critical Essays (1966)
- The Signs Among Us (1968) – poetry
- Modern English Literature (1970)
- The Definition of Literature (1982)
- A Prologue to English Literature (1986)
- Critical Enquiries (1993)
- The Oxford History of English Literature 1890–1950 (1993)
- The Oxford Book of Edwardian Verse (1993)
