= Sex-lethal =

IPR006546

Identifiers
- Symbol: Sxl
- InterPro: IPR006546
Available protein structures:
- PDB: IPR006546
- AlphaFold: IPR006546

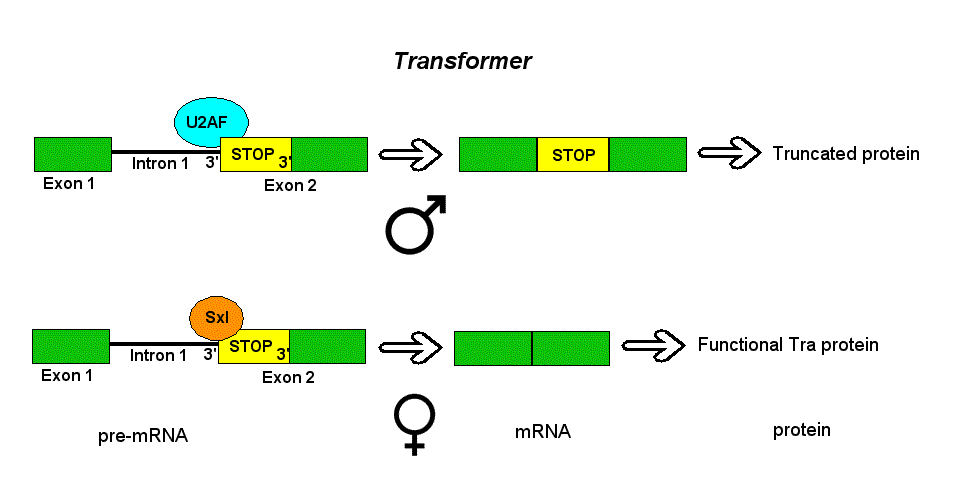
Alternative splicing of the Drosophila Transformer gene product.

Sex-lethal (Sxl) is the master regulatory gene for both sex determination and dosage compensation in Drosophila melanogaster (P19339), where it functions as an RNA-binding protein. Named for its mutation phenotype in D. melanogaster, Sxl is found in Dipteran insects. Though present in both sexes, Sxl's activity is female-specific in D. melanogaster. It is most closely related to the ELAV/HUD subfamily of splicing factors.

== Mechanism of Action ==
In D. melanogaster, Sxl exerts its effects primarily through post-transcriptional regulation, specifically alternative splicing and translational repression. It regulates at least three key target genes: *Sxl* itself (autoregulation), *transformer (tra)* (sex determination), and *male-specific lethal-2 (msl-2)* (dosage compensation).

=== Autoregulation ===
Sxl regulates its own expression through a positive feedback loop in females. This involves alternative splicing of the *Sxl* pre-mRNA. In males, the *Sxl* transcript includes a "male-specific exon" (exon 3) that contains an early stop codon, resulting in a truncated, non-functional protein. In females, Sxl protein binds to its own pre-mRNA at multiple sites, both upstream and downstream of the male-specific exon. This binding primarily influences the selection of the 5' splice site of the male exon, promoting the skipping of the male-specific exon and the production of a full-length, functional Sxl protein. The protein PPS interacts with Sxl and helps mediate this effect.

=== *transformer* Regulation ===
In fruit flies, Sxl protein participates in alternative splicing of the transformer gene, ultimately deciding the sex of the fly. Sxl induces female-specific alternative splicing of the transformer (tra) pre-mRNA by binding to uridine-rich polypyrimidine tracts near the non-sex-specific 3' splice site. This binding prevents the general splicing factor U2AF from binding, thus promoting the use of a female-specific upstream 3' splice site.

=== *msl-2* Regulation ===
Sxl regulates *male-specific lethal-2 (msl-2)*, a key component of the dosage compensation complex, through a combination of alternative splicing and translational repression. Sxl binds to both the 5' and 3' UTRs of *msl-2* mRNA. The binding in the 5' UTR leads to the retention of an intron containing a stop codon, while binding in both UTRs contributes to translational repression. This prevents the production of MSL-2 protein in females, thereby preventing dosage compensation from occurring.

=== Additional Targets and Translational Control ===
Beyond *tra* and *msl-2*, Sxl has been shown to affect the expression of other genes. RIP-seq analysis has identified hundreds of potential Sxl targets in primordial germ cells, suggesting a broader role in gene regulation. Sxl also regulates gene expression by repressing translation, binding to both the 5' and 3'UTRs.

== Protein Structure ==
SXL contains an N-terminal Gly/Asn-rich domain that may be responsible for protein-protein interaction, and tandem RNA recognition motifs (RRMs) that show high preference for binding single-stranded, uridine-rich target RNA transcripts. The crystal structure of the tandem RRMs bound to a *tra*-derived RNA reveals a V-shaped cleft where the RNA binds. Notably, there are no interdomain contacts between the RRMs in the absence of RNA, indicating conformational flexibility.

== Evolution ==
- Sxl* homologs have been found in a wide range of insects, including other Diptera (flies), mosquitoes, butterflies, beetles, honeybees, ants, and aphids. However, the sex-determining function of Sxl appears to be specific to *Drosophila* and closely related species. Changes in the N- and C-termini of Sxl, rather than the RNA-binding region, are likely responsible for the evolution of its sex-determination function in *Drosophila*.

== Protein Interactions ==
Sxl is known to interact with several other proteins, including:

- **U2AF:** Sxl antagonizes the binding of U2AF to the *tra* pre-mRNA.
- **PPS:** Sxl interacts with PPS, a large multidomain protein, which is required for *Sxl* autoregulation.
- **SNF (sans fille):** Sxl interacts with SNF, a U1 snRNP protein, in the regulation of *Sxl* splicing.
- **Sister of Sex-lethal (Ssx)**: Sxl and Ssx have comparable RNA-binding specificity, and compete for binding to RNA regulatory elements in the Sxl transcript.
- **eIF4E:** The translation initiation factor eIF4E has been shown to interact with Sxl and play a role in *msl-2* and *Sxl* splicing.

== Mutations and Phenotypes ==
The name "Sex-lethal" derives from the fact that loss-of-function mutations are lethal in females (XX individuals) due to misregulation of dosage compensation. Some *Sxl* alleles cause female sterility rather than lethality. Conversely, gain-of-function *Sxl* alleles can be lethal in males. Mutations in *Sxl* can also affect sexual behavior and pheromone production. Somatic mosaic females that carry mutations in the *Sxl* gene develop abnormal genitalia and reproductive tissue.
