= Anne Villeneuve (scientist) =

American geneticist

Professor Anne Villeneuve Ph.D.
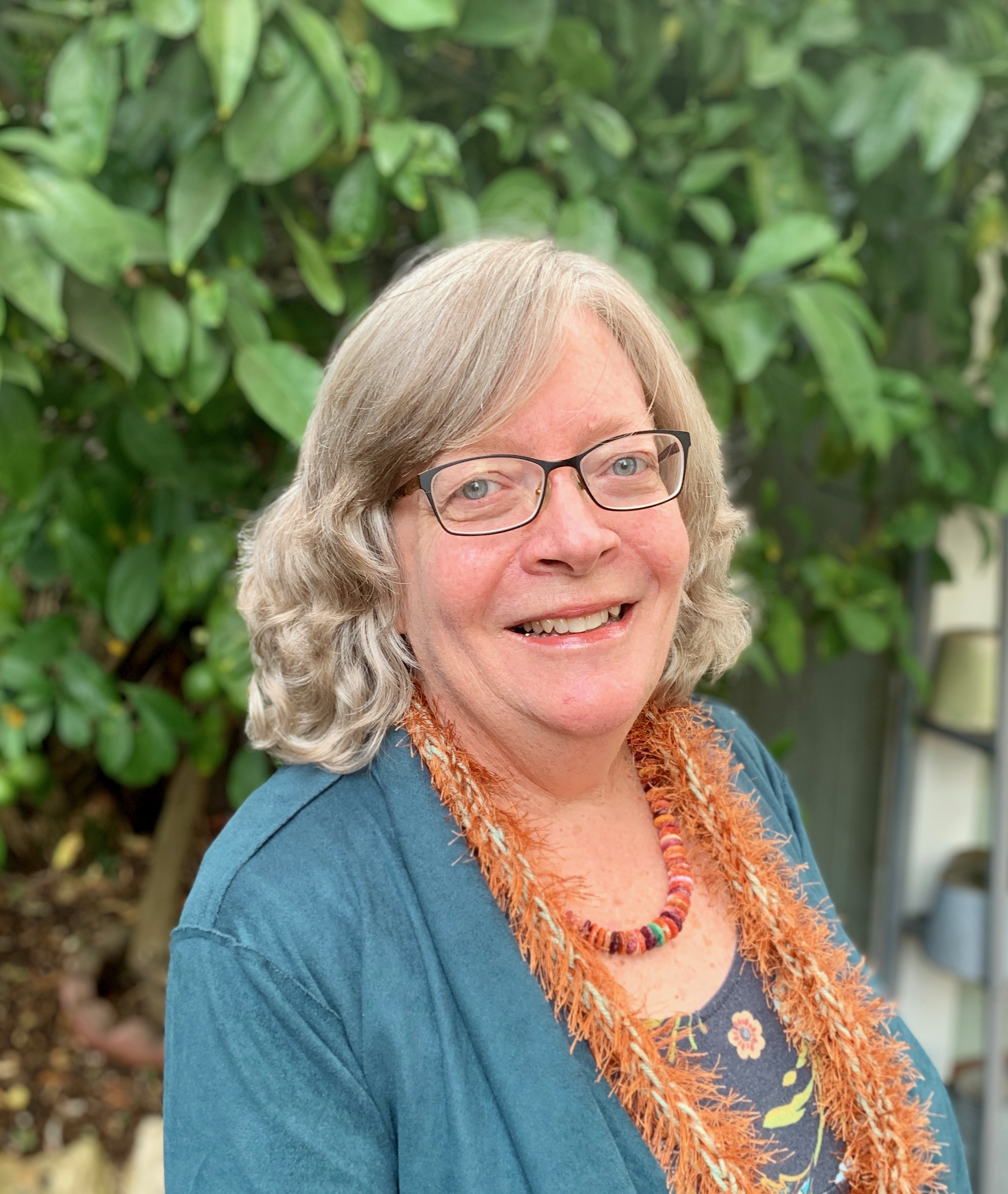
- Education: University of Notre Dame, Massachusetts Institute of Technology
- Scientific career
- Institutions: Stanford University
- Academic advisors: Barbara J. Meyer
- Notable students: Abby Dernburg

Anne Villeneuve is an American geneticist. She is known for her work on the mechanisms governing chromosome inheritance during sexual reproduction. Her work focuses on meiosis, the process by which a diploid organism, having two sets of chromosomes, produces gametes with only one set of chromosomes. She is a professor of Developmental Biology and of Genetics at Stanford University and a member of the National Academy of Sciences.

== Career ==
Villeneuve earned a B.S. in biochemistry at the University of Notre Dame in 1981, and a Ph.D. in biology from MIT in 1989, where she worked on sex determination and dosage compensation in the laboratory of Barbara J. Meyer. She joined Stanford University as an Independent Fellow in 1989 and began to work on meiosis. She joined the faculty at Stanford in 1995.

Her work has been instrumental in establishing the nematode Caenorhabditis elegans as a major model system for investigating how homologous chromosomes pair up during meiosis, and how they recombine, exchanging genetic information. Her work has helped elucidate whether mechanisms of meiotic recombination are conserved from yeast to multicellular organisms.

== Awards and honors ==
- 2019: Genetics Society of America Medal
- 2017: Member, National Academy of Sciences
- 2016: Member, American Academy of Arts and Sciences
- 2016: American Cancer Society Research Professor Award, American Cancer Society
- 2003: Kirsch Investigator Award, Steven and Michele Kirsch Foundation
- 1999: Junior Faculty Scholar Award, Howard Hughes Medical Institute
- 1996: Searle Scholars Award, Chicago Community Trust
