= R. Scott Hawley =

American scientist

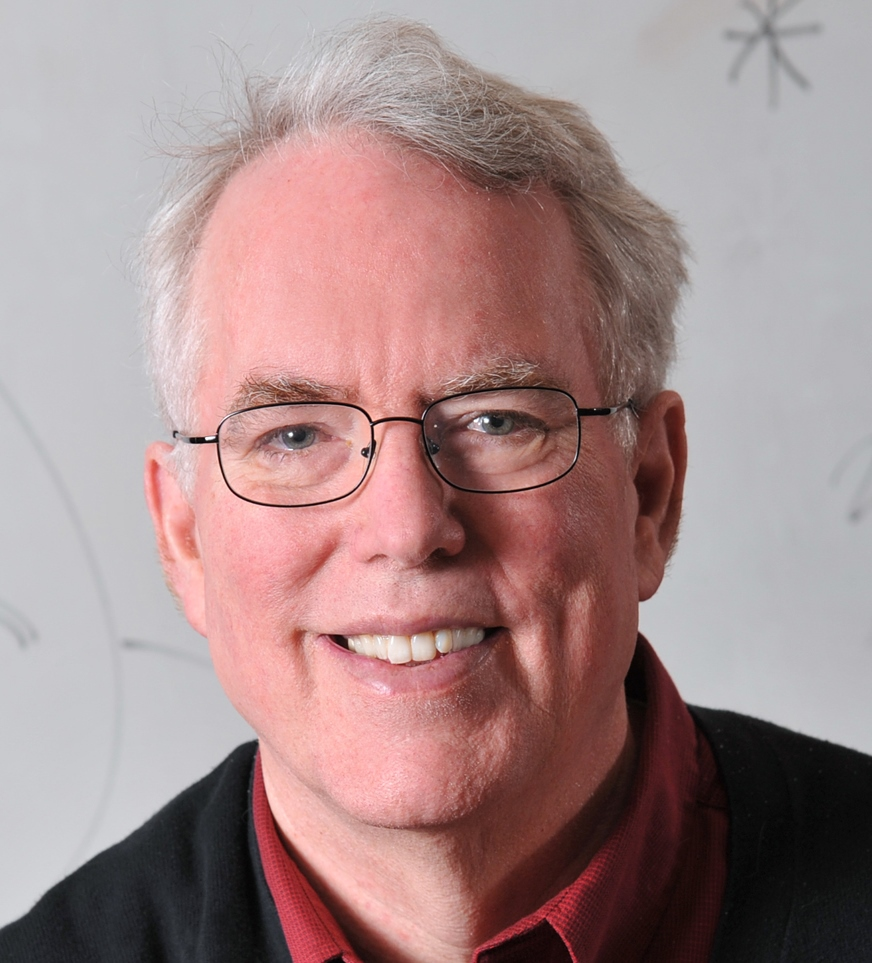
- R. Scott Hawley, 1953, American scientist
- Born: 8 October 1953 (age 72); US Naval Hospital in Naples, Italy
- Died: January 31, 2025; Kansas City, Kansas
- Citizenship: United States of America
- Education: University of California, Riverside (BS, 1975), University of Washington, Seattle (PhD, 1979)
- Known for: Genetic cytological analysis in Drosophila
- Awards: Genetics Society of America, George W. Beadle Award (2013), Fellow, American Association for the Advancement of Science, Member, National Academy of Sciences, President, Genetics Society of America
- Scientific career
- Fields: Genetics
- Workplaces: Stowers Institute for Medical Research, University of Kansas, University of Missouri at Kansas City
- Thesis: Chromosomal Sites Necessary for Normal Levels of Meiotic Recombination (1979)
- Doctoral advisor: Laurence M. Sandler

R. Scott Hawley (1953-2025) was an American geneticist and investigator at the Stowers Institute for Medical Research in Kansas City, Missouri, a member of the US National Academy of sciences and fellow of the American Association for the Advancement of Science. He was a past President of the Genetics Society of America, and led a research team focused on the molecular mechanisms that regulate chromosome behavior during meiosis.

== Early life and education ==
Hawley was born in the US Naval Hospital in Naples, Italy. He graduated from high school in Castro Valley, California. He attended the University of California, Riverside as an undergraduate from 1971 to 1975, and graduated with a degree in biology. Hawley's scientific research as an undergraduate working in the lab of Dean Parker, which culminated in his first scientific publication in 1975. Hawley did doctoral work with Larry Sandler at the University of Washington in Seattle, Washington, where he began his career-long interest in chromosome pairing. After finishing his PhD in 1979, Hawley secured a Helen Hay Whitney Postdoctoral Fellowship to study with Kenneth Tartof at the Institute for Cancer Research in Philadelphia, Pennsylvania.

== Career ==
Hawley's was appointed in 1982 as an assistant professor in the Departments of Genetics and Molecular Biology at the Albert Einstein College of Medicine in New York. He was granted tenure and promoted to an associate professor in 1988. In 1991 he moved his lab to the University of California, Davis as professor. In 2001 he accepted a position as investigator at the Stowers Institute for Medical Research in Kansas City, Missouri. In conjunction with this position, he is also a professor of physiology with tenure at the University of Kansas Medical School in Kansas City, Kansas and an adjunct professor of biology at the University of Missouri in Kansas City, Missouri. From 2011 to 2019 Hawley served as the dean of the Graduate School of the Stowers Institute and later held the title of founding dean emeritus.

== Scholarship ==
Using the model organism Drosophila melanogaster, Hawley's research was focused on understanding how homologous chromosomes recognize one another, pair, and ultimately segregate from one another during meiosis – the cell division that produces sperm or eggs. His work sought to gain a deeper mechanistic understanding of the synaptonemal complex (SC), a larger protein structure that assembles between the chromosomes during meiosis

== Contributions to higher education ==
Hawley trained over 45 postdoctoral associates and graduate students. In 1989 he was elected to the Davidow Society at the Albert Einstein College of Medicine for excellence in teaching. In 2008 he was the recipient of the Genetics Society of America's Elizabeth W. Jones Award for Teaching Excellence . In 2012 Hawley founded a new graduate school within the Stowers Institute for Medical Research and later served as its Dean Emeritus.

== Published works ==
In addition to over 169 research publications, Hawley co-authored the following books:

- The Human Genome: A User's Guide by R. Scott Hawley and Catherine Mori (1999, 2005, 2010). Academic Press, San Diego.
- Drosophila Protocols by William S. Sullivan, Michael Ashburner, and R. Scott Hawley (2000). Cold Spring Harbor Press, New York.
- Advanced Genetic Analysis: Finding Meaning in a Genome by R. Scott Hawley and Michelle Walker (2003). Blackwell Publishing, Boston.
- Drosophila: A Laboratory Handbook, Second Edition, by Michael Ashburner, Kent Golic, and R. Scott Hawley (2005). Cold Spring Harbor Press, New York.
- Genetic Theory and Analysis, Finding Meaning in a Genome by Danny E. Miller, Angela L. Miller, and R. Scott Hawley (2023). John Wiley & Sons, Hoboken.

== Honors ==
In 1984 Hawley was awarded a Searle Scholarship for his research into chromosome pairing and recombination. In 2001 he was elected as a Fellow of the American Association for the Advancement of Science, and in 2006 he was elected to the American Academy of Arts and Sciences for his research on the role of heterochromatin in chromosome pairing. In 2009 and 2010 he served as the vice president and president respectively, of the Genetics Society of America. In 2011 he was elected to the National Academy of Sciences. In 2013 Hawley was honored with the Genetics Society of America's George W. Beadle Award for his service to the community of genetics researchers.
