= Edgar Altenburg =

American biologist (1888–1967)

- Born: January 11, 1888; New Jersey, United States
- Died: August 27, 1967 (aged 79); Houston, Texas, United States
- Occupation: Biologist

Edgar Altenburg (January 11, 1888 – August 27, 1967) was an American biologist who conducted seminal research into evolution and genetics.

== Biography ==
Altenburg was born on January 11, 1888, in New Jersey, United States. He was the son of Ottillie von Adelung and Gustav Adolf Altenburg.

He graduated from Columbia University. He then served as the instructor of biology at the William M. Rice Institute.

He died on August 27, 1967, in Houston, Texas, United States.
