= National Association for the Teaching of English =

- Abbreviation: NATE
- Predecessor: London Association for the Teaching of English (est. 1947)
- Formation: 1963
- Type: School subject association
- Headquarters: Altrincham
- Region served: United Kingdom
- Members: 2,000
- Director: Jonathan Morgan
- Affiliations: International Federation of the Teachers of English
- Website: www.nate.org.uk

The National Association for the Teaching of English (NATE) is a UK association mandated to support effective English language teaching skills and to give teachers a voice at a national level.

== Structure ==
NATE has several committees and standing working parties. It conducts research into the teaching of English and is involved in curriculum development initiatives with the Arts Council. NATE is also a member of the International Federation of the Teachers of English.

After a period based in Huddersfield, NATE's office was for many years in Sheffield on Broomgrove Road, then Broadfield Road and, from 2015, at Aizlewood's Mill. In 2020, NATE's office moved to Altrincham.

== Publications ==
NATE publishes a number of periodicals, which are free to members:

=== English in Education ===
English in Education is NATE's academic research journal, first published in 1967. Articles are peer-reviewed and aimed at those conducting research in education.

=== Teaching English ===
Teaching English is NATE's magazine aimed at secondary teachers of English. The magazine contains articles on practical teaching strategies and resources; articles on trends in English teaching and research; news pages, opinion pieces and columns; and book reviews relevant to English teachers. Teaching English was first published in 2013. It originally also contained articles aimed at primary school teachers, but these moved to Primary Matters in 2015.

=== Primary Matters ===
Primary Matters contains articles aimed at teachers of English in primary schools. It was first published in 2015. Originally a print publication bundled with Teaching English, it is now an online-only publication, available as a downloadable PDF.

=== NATE News ===
An online newsletter updating members on news in the world of English teaching and NATE.

=== NATENET ===
NATENET ('NET' standing for 'New English Teachers') is an online newsletter aimed at new and recently qualified teachers of English, first published in 2017.

=== IllumiNATE ===
An email newsletter of teaching techniques.

=== Former publications ===
NATE Bulletin was an academic journal published from 1964 until 1966. It was replaced by English in Education.

NATE members used to receive The English and Media Magazine, produced by the English and Media Centre, until it ceased publication in 2002. It was effectively replaced by English Drama Media (2003–2012), a professional journal published directly by NATE, containing articles on trends in English teaching and research and opinion pieces. The Primary English Magazine and The Secondary English Magazine, published by Garth Publishing Services, were also sent to NATE members in those sectors until the end of 2006 when NATE launched its own practical teaching magazine NATE Classroom (2007–2012). English Drama Media and NATE Classroom amalgamated into Teaching English in 2013.

== NATE in the news ==
NATE is called upon to speak on behalf of English teachers to various news organisations. Links to the most recent articles are linked below.

GCSE Essays sickeningly Violent

== Staffroom Area ==
NATE, in conjunction with Teachit , runs an informational staffroom area to provide prompt answers to questions it receives. Staffroom Area
