= Kendal Broadie =

American biologist

- Education: University of Oregon, Ph.D
- Scientific career
- Fields: Biology
- Workplaces: Vanderbilt University

Kendal Broadie is an American biologist specializing in genetic dissection of nervous system development, function and plasticity, currently the Eldon Stevenson, Jr. Professor at Vanderbilt University.

He has a research laboratory at Vanderbilt University named as Broadie Laboratory.
