= Kathleen Collins (scientist) =

American biophysicist

- Born: December, 1965; New Haven, CT
- Education: Yale University; Massachusetts Institute of Technology; Cold Spring Harbor Lab
- Scientific career
- Workplaces: University of California, Berkeley
- Thesis: (1992)

Kathleen Collins is an American RNA biologist and professor at the University of California, Berkeley. Her research considers telomerase RNA structure and telomere function, and eukaryotic transposable elements. In 2020 she was elected a Fellow of the American Academy of Arts and Sciences.

== Early life and education ==
Collins was a graduate student at the Whitehead Institute.

== Research and career ==
Collins joined the faculty at the University of California, Berkeley in 1995. Her research has considered the structure and function of the enzyme telomerase. Telomerase is a reverse transcriptase that protects chromosomes by replacing the telomere, a short section of DNA lost from the ends of chromosomes during DNA replication. It was first detected in the late 1970s by Elizabeth Blackburn. The telomere prevents the chromosomes from fusing. Most cells turn off telomerase, restricting their proliferation, whilst cancer cells activate telomerase and encourage cell division. In 2018 Collins reported the most detailed image of the three-dimensional molecular structure of telomerase, which offered hope for the design of drugs that can prevent cancer and ageing.

Collins developed a scalpel-free approach to tumour biopsies. Cancer cells shed DNA into blood, DNA that can reveal mutations within the tumours that might make them resistant to treatment. The Collins approach samples small sections of DNA or RNA found in the blood, which can provide information about the presence of a tumour. This type of sampling can also tell whether or not a cancer has metastasised or whether it will respond to certain therapies. In 2017 she decided to spin this technology out into a company; KarnaTeq.

In 2020 Collins was elected into the American Academy of Arts and Sciences.
