= Lawrence S.B. Goldstein =

- Born: February 20, 1956; Buffalo, NY
- Education: University of California, San Diego; University of Washington, Seattle
- Scientific career
- Workplaces: University of California, San Diego

Lawrence S.B. Goldstein (born February 20, 1956, in Buffalo, New York) is a professor of cellular and molecular medicine at University of California, San Diego and investigator with the Howard Hughes Medical Institute. He receives grant funding from the NIH, the Johns Hopkins ALS Center, the HighQ Foundation, and the California Institute for Regenerative Medicine. In 2020 he was elected to the National Academy of Sciences.

== Biography ==
Dr. Goldstein received his B.A. degree in biology and genetics from UCSD in 1976 and his Ph.D. degree in genetics from the University of Washington, Seattle in 1980. He did postdoctoral research at the University of Colorado at Boulder from 1980 to 1983 and the Massachusetts Institute of Technology in 1983/1984. He was assistant, associate and full professor at Harvard University in the Department of Cellular and Developmental Biology from 1984 to 1993 and moved to UCSD and HHMI in 1993. His awards include a Senior Scholar Award from the Ellison Medical Foundation, an American Cancer Society Faculty Research Award, and the Loeb Chair in Natural Sciences when he was at Harvard University.

His research is focused on understanding the molecular mechanisms of intracellular movement in neurons and the role of transport failures in neurodegenerative diseases. His lab provided the first molecular descriptions of kinesin structure and organization, and also discovered important links between transport processes and diseases such as Alzheimer's disease and Huntington's disease. Goldstein has also had an active role in National Science policy. He has served on many public science advisory committees, has written about, spoken about, and been interviewed on numerous occasions on science issues by print and broadcast media, and has testified on a number of occasions in the U.S. House of Representatives and the Senate about NIH funding and stem cell research. As a cofounder and consultant of the biotechnology company Cytokinetics, Inc. he has also had an active role in private industry. Goldstein has also served as elected secretary of the American Society for Cell Biology (ASCB).

== See also ==
- Through_the_Wormhole#Season_8_(2017)
