= Drosophila Research Conference =

The Drosophila Research Conference, informally known as "the fly meeting", is an annual meeting of Drosophila researchers held in North America since 1958. It is the principal research gathering for "Drosophilists", and is international in scope, drawing 1500 participants in a typical year. The conference is sponsored by the Genetics Society of America (GSA).

Several significant awards are made annually at the conference, including:

- Larry Sandler Memorial Award (established 1988; a platform lecture is made)
- Drosophila Image Award (established 2004)
- GSA Novitski Prize
- GSA Medal
