= Susan Meyer Markle =

American psychologist (1928–2008)

Susan Meyer Markle (1928–2008) was an American psychologist. She worked with B. F. Skinner on programmed instruction.

== Biography ==
Susan Meyer Markle was born Susan Rogers on November 11, 1928, to Alden and Ruth Rogers. Considered a luminary of B.F. Skinner's teaching machine innovation, Markle worked as a researcher at his Harvard laboratory from 1956 to 1960.

An avid lover of jazz music, Markle served as board member and president of the Jazz Institute of Chicago. She was a jazz scholar and video editor of Jazz Times magazine.

Susan Meyer Markle died on December 19, 2008, at the age of 80.

== Education and academic career ==
Characterized as one of the "godmothers" of programmed instruction and machine-based training, Markle was highly trained in her field, and had a long and distinguished career. Some of her accomplishments are:

- Researcher at B.F. Skinner's laboratory 1956–1960
- Assistant Professor of Psychology at the University of California, Los Angeles (UCLA)
- Professor of Psychology and Director of Instructional Resources at the University of Illinois at Chicago, 1965–1993
- Director of Programing for the Center for Programed Instruction, Inc.
- Member of the National Society of Performance and Instruction
- Member of the International Society for Performance Improvement

== Research ==
While she was an associate of B.F. Skinner in the early years of her life, Markle focused on the design process, and many of her ideas are clearly influenced by his work. In her book Designs for Instructional Designers, Markle outlined and described three basic principles of instructional programming. Following is a synopsis of what these principles entail.

- The learner learns what he or she does, which Markle labels "active responding". She specifies that a significant part of learning occurs within the learner's head, that is, covert processes that cannot be seen. In order to determine that learning has therefore occurred, the instructor must have empirical evidence, that is, overt behaviors that can be measured.
- In the second principle, described as "errorless" learning, Markle posits that although only the learner learns, the instructor, or designer, or programmer, fosters learning through the wise selection of instructional designs.
- The final principle is "immediate feedback", and is essentially based on the reinforcement theory of instructional design. Markle establishes her that "immediate reinforcers" are used in shaping behaviors, very similar to Skinner's operant techniques.

In her book, Markle underscores the notion that good designs require time and thought to develop.

Later in her life, Markle collaborated with her husband Philip Tiemann to develop and expand on her earlier idea that programming was a process. They developed a detailed procedural flow chart which consisted of, among other things, analyses of learning and learning tasks. They also examined the place that specific objectives had in the learning process, and the need for active practice and feedback.

Markle and Tiemann identified ten fundamental learning outcomes, and delineated the process for the creation and testing of stimuli control. These include motor responses, complex chains of responding, basic verbal discrimination, conceptual responding, and novel behavior.

In addition, Markle, again working with Tiemann, developed what was known as the three columns of learning outcomes, which are based on the kind of skill that the learner acquires in each. These columns are:

- Psychomotor column - where the learner learns to respond. The emphasis is on the exact form of the response.
- Single cognitive column - which involves simple stimulus-response relationships that focus on when the response occurs.
- Complex cognitive column - the ability to respond to new or novel situations.

Markle's research and work are still relevant in informing contemporary thought in instructional design.

== Publications ==
Markle published a number of books and articles. She is known to have championed to cause of spelling the words "programing" and "programed" with a single "m". Many of these publications were done in collaboration with Philip Tiemann, and include:

- Markle, S.M. (1961). A programed primer on programing, Volumes 1-2. New York: Center for Programed Instruction
- Markle, S.M. Individualizing Programing Instruction: The Programer. The Teachers College Record, Volume 66, Number 3, 1964, p. 219-228
- Markle, S.M. (1963). Words: A programed course in vocabulary development. Indiana University: Science Research Associates
- Markle, S.M. (1969). Good frames and bad: A grammar of frame writing. Champaign, IL: Stipes Publishing Company
- Markle, S.M. Programing and programed instruction. Volume 1, Center for Programed Instruction, University of Michigan
- Markle, S.M. & Tiemann, P. (1970). Really understanding concepts: Or, in frumious pursuit of the jabberwock: Instructional manual. Champaign, IL: Stipes Publishing Company
- Markle, S.M. (1978). Designs for instructional designers. Champaign, IL: Stipes Publishing Company
- Tiemann, P.W. & Markle, S.M. (1983). Analyzing instructional content: A guide to instruction and evaluation. Champaign, IL: Stipes Publishing Co.
- Markle, S.M. Inside the Teaching Machine in The Saturday Review, November 18, 1961, p. 55
