= Genetics (journal) =

- Discipline: Genetics
- Language: English
- Edited by: Howard Lipshitz (editor)

Publication details
- History: 1916–present
- Publisher: Genetics Society of America (United States)
- Open access: Delayed (after 12 months)
- Impact factor: 6.5 (2025)

Standard abbreviations
- ISO 4: Genetics

Indexing
- ISSN: 0016-6731 (print); 1943-2631 (web)

Links
- Journal homepage

Genetics is a monthly scientific journal publishing investigations bearing on heredity, genetics, biochemistry and molecular biology. Genetics is published by the Genetics Society of America. It has a delayed open access policy, and makes articles available online without a subscription after 12 months have elapsed since first publication. Since 2010, it is published online-only. George Harrison Shull was the founding editor of Genetics in 1916.

== Editors-in-Chief ==
Editor-in-Chief	Term
George Harrison Shull	1916–1925
Donald F. Jones	1926–1935
L. C. Dunn	1936–1939
Marcus Morton Rhoades	1940–1946
Curt Stern	1947–1951
R. A. Brink and James F. Crow	1952–1956
Clarence Paul Oliver and Wilson Stone	1957–1962
David D. Perkins	1963–1967
F. W. Caspari	1968–1972
D.R. Stadler	1973–1976
G. Lefevre	1977–1981
John W. Drake	1982–1996
Elizabeth W. Jones	1996–2008
Mark Johnston	2008–2021
Howard Lipshitz	2021–present
