= List of members of the National Academy of Sciences (cellular and developmental biology) =

This list is a subsection of the List of members of the National Academy of Sciences, which includes members and international members of the United States National Academy of Sciences, living and deceased, each affiliated with one of the academy's disciplinary sections. Members are listed under their primary section, and each entry gives the person's name, primary institution, and election year. For deceased members, the year of death is noted.

| Name | Institution | Year |
|---|---|---|
| C. David Allis (died 2023) | The Rockefeller University | 2005 |
| Spyros Artavanis-Tsakonas | Harvard Medical School | 2023 |
| Giuseppe Attardi (died 2008) | California Institute of Technology | 1984 |
| Mary C. Beckerle | Huntsman Cancer Institute | 2021 |
| Wolfgang Beermann (died 2000) | Max Planck Institute for Biology | 1975 |
| Paul Berg (died 2023) | Stanford University | 1966 |
| Eric Betzig | University of California, Berkeley | 2015 |
| Wendy Bickmore | University of Edinburgh | 2025 |
| Adrian Bird | University of Edinburgh | 2016 |
| Max L. Birnstiel (died 2014) | Intercell | 1983 |
| Mina J. Bissell | Lawrence Berkeley National Laboratory | 2010 |
| Helen M. Blau | Stanford University | 2016 |
| Günter Blobel (died 2018) | Rockefeller University | 1983 |
| Gary G. Borisy | The ADA Forsyth Institute | 2009 |
| Piet Borst | Netherlands Cancer Institute | 1991 |
| Jean Brachet (died 1988) | Free University of Brussels | 1965 |
| Robert W. Briggs (died 1983) | Indiana University | 1962 |
| Ralph L. Brinster | University of Pennsylvania | 1987 |
| Marianne Bronner | California Institute of Technology | 2015 |
| Donald D. Brown (died 2023) | Carnegie Institution of Washington | 1973 |
| Joan S. Brugge | Harvard University | 2001 |
| Margaret Buckingham | Institut Pasteur | 2011 |
| Gary Nathan Calkins (died 1943) | Columbia University | 1919 |
| Lewis Clayton Cantley | Dana-Farber Harvard Cancer Center | 2001 |
| Mario R. Capecchi | University of Utah | 1991 |
| Howard Cedar | Hebrew University of Jerusalem | 2022 |
| Constance L. Cepko | Harvard University | 2002 |
| Pierre Chambon (died 2026) | Institut de Genetique et de Biologie Moleculaire et Cellulaire (IGBMC) | 1985 |
| Don W. Cleveland | University of California, San Diego | 2006 |
| Hans Clevers | Roche Pharma Research & Early Development | 2014 |
| Stanley Cohen (died 2020) | Vanderbilt University | 1980 |
| James E. Darnell Jr. | Rockefeller University | 1973 |
| Eric H. Davidson (died 2015) | California Institute of Technology | 1985 |
| Bernard D. Davis (died 1994) | Harvard Medical School | 1967 |
| Igor B. Dawid (died 2024) | National Institutes of Health | 1981 |
| Edward M. De Robertis | David Geffen School of Medicine at UCLA | 2013 |
| Eugenia Del Pino | Pontificia Universidad Católica del Ecuador | 2006 |
| Abby F. Dernburg | University of California, Berkeley | 2024 |
| Claude Desplan | New York University | 2018 |
| Chris Q. Doe | University of Oregon | 2017 |
| David G. Drubin | University of California, Berkeley | 2022 |
| Denis Duboule | École Polytechnique Fédérale de Lausanne | 2012 |
| Peter H. Duesberg | University of California, Berkeley | 1986 |
| Renato Dulbecco (died 2012) | Salk Institute for Biological Studies | 1961 |
| Harry Eagle (died 1992) | Albert Einstein College of Medicine | 1963 |
| William C. Earnshaw | University of Edinburgh | 2025 |
| James D. Ebert (died 2001) | Johns Hopkins University | 1967 |
| Bruce A. Edgar | University of Utah | 2025 |
| Judith S. Eisen | University of Oregon | 2024 |
| Scott D. Emr | Cornell University | 2007 |
| John Franklin Enders (died 1985) | Children’s Hospital Boston | 1953 |
| Anne Ephrussi | European Molecular Biology Laboratory | 2022 |
| R. L. Erikson (died 2020) | Harvard University | 1983 |
| Marilyn Gist Farquhar (died 2019) | University of California, San Diego | 1984 |
| Don W. Fawcett (died 2009) | Harvard University | 1972 |
| Gottfried S. Fraenkel (died 1984) | University of Illinois Urbana-Champaign | 1968 |
| Elaine Fuchs | Rockefeller University | 1996 |
| Margaret T. Fuller | Stanford University | 2008 |
| Joseph G. Gall (died 2024) | Carnegie Institution of Washington | 1972 |
| Walter J. Gehring (died 2014) | University of Basel | 1986 |
| John C. Gerhart | University of California, Berkeley | 1990 |
| Alfred L. Goldberg (died 2023) | Harvard University | 2015 |
| Lawrence S. Goldstein | University of California, San Diego | 2020 |
| Howard Green (died 2015) | Harvard University | 1978 |
| Michael Green (died 2023) | University of Massachusetts Medical School | 2014 |
| Clifford Grobstein (died 1998) | University of California, San Diego | 1966 |
| Jerome Gross (died 2014) | Harvard University | 1974 |
| John B. Gurdon (died 2025) | University of Cambridge | 1980 |
| Karl Habel (died 1981) | National Institute of Health | 1968 |
| W. A. Hagins (died 2012) | National Institutes of Health | 1979 |
| Viktor Hamburger (died 2001) | Washington University in St. Louis | 1953 |
| Richard M. Harland | University of California, Berkeley | 2014 |
| Carl G. Hartman (died 1968) | Carnegie Institution of Washington | 1937 |
| Leland H. Hartwell | Fred Hutchinson Cancer Research Center | 1987 |
| Elizabeth D. Hay (died 2007) | Harvard University | 1984 |
| Rebecca Heald | University of California, Berkeley | 2019 |
| Edith Heard | European Molecular Biology Laboratory | 2021 |
| Ira Herskowitz (died 2003) | University of California, San Francisco | 1986 |
| Frederik L. Hisaw (died 1972) | Harvard University | 1947 |
| Brigid L.M. Hogan | Duke University | 2005 |
| David S. Hogness (died 2019) | Stanford University | 1976 |
| Robert W. Holley (died 1993) | Salk Institute for Biological Studies | 1968 |
| Johannes Holtfreter (died 1992) | University of Rochester | 1955 |
| Rollin D. Hotchkiss (died 2004) | Rockefeller University | 1961 |
| Tim Hunt | Francis Crick Institute | 1999 |
| Anthony Hyman | Max Planck Institute of Molecular Cell Biology and Genetics | 2020 |
| Richard O. Hynes (died 2026) | Massachusetts Institute of Technology | 1996 |
| Shinya Inoué (died 2019) | Marine Biological Laboratory | 1993 |
| Merkel Jacobs (died 1970) | University of Pennsylvania | 1939 |
| Fotis C. Kafatos (died 2017) | European Molecular Biology Laboratory | 1982 |
| Thomas C. Kaufman | Indiana University | 2008 |
| Raymond E. Keller | University of Virginia | 2025 |
| George Khoury (died 1987) | National Cancer Institute | 1987 |
| Judith Kimble | University of Wisconsin–Madison | 1995 |
| Charles B. Kimmel | University of Oregon | 2022 |
| David M. Kingsley | Stanford University | 2011 |
| Marc W. Kirschner | Harvard University | 1989 |
| Aaron Klug (died 2018) | Medical Research Council (UK) | 1984 |
| Thomas B. Kornberg | University of California, San Francisco | 2025 |
| Robb Krumlauf | Stowers Institute for Medical Research | 2016 |
| Nicole Le Douarin | Académie des Sciences de l'Institut de France | 1989 |
| Philip Leder (died 2020) | Harvard University | 1979 |
| Jeannie T. Lee | Harvard University | 2015 |
| Ruth Lehmann | New York University | 2005 |
| Maria Leptin | European Research Council | 2023 |
| Michael S. Levine | Princeton University | 1998 |
| Jennifer Lippincott-Schwartz | National Institutes of Health | 2008 |
| Harvey F. Lodish | Massachusetts Institute of Technology | 1987 |
| Richard M. Losick | Harvard University | 1992 |
| David J. L. Luck (died 1998) | Rockefeller University | 1984 |
| Anthony P. Mahowald | University of Chicago | 1994 |
| Edward L. Mark (died 1946) | Harvard University | 1903 |
| Gail R. Martin (died 2026) | University of California, San Francisco | 2002 |
| Joan Massagué | Memorial Sloan Kettering Cancer Center | 2000 |
| Iain Mattaj | Human Technopole Foundation | 2017 |
| Satyajit (Jitu) Mayor | National Centre for Biological Sciences | 2015 |
| Daniel Mazia (died 1996) | Stanford University | 1960 |
| Clarence McClung (died 1946) | University of Pennsylvania | 1920 |
| William J. McGinnis | University of California, San Diego | 2019 |
| J. Richard McIntosh | University of Colorado Boulder | 1999 |
| Steven L. McKnight | University of Texas Southwestern Medical Center | 1992 |
| Andrew P. McMahon | California Institute of Technology | 2020 |
| Peter Medawar (died 1987) | Medical Research Council | 1965 |
| Douglas A. Melton | Harvard University | 1995 |
| Oscar L. Miller Jr. (died 2012) | University of Virginia | 1978 |
| Alfred Mirsky (died 1974) | Rockefeller University | 1954 |
| Timothy J. Mitchison | Harvard University | 2014 |
| Denise J. Montell | University of California, Santa Barbara | 2021 |
| Melissa J. Moore | University of Massachusetts Chan Medical School | 2017 |
| Ginés Morata | Consejo Superior de Investigaciones Cientificas (CSIC) | 2018 |
| Aron Arthur Moscona (died 2009) | University of Chicago | 1977 |
| Alex B. Novikoff (died 1987) | Albert Einstein College of Medicine] | 1974 |
| Paul Nurse | Francis Crick Institute | 1995 |
| Roeland Nusse | Stanford University | 2010 |
| Christiane Nüsslein-Volhard | Max Planck Institute for Developmental Biology | 1990 |
| Patrick H. O’Farrell | University of California, San Francisco | 2017 |
| Eric N. Olson | University of Texas Southwestern Medical Center | 2000 |
| Lelio Orci (died 2019) | University of Geneva | 1998 |
| George E. Palade (died 2008) | University of California, San Diego | 1961 |
| Arthur B. Pardee (died 2019) | Harvard University | 1968 |
| Nipam H. Patel | Marine Biological Laboratory | 2024 |
| Sheldon Penman (died 2021) | Massachusetts Institute of Technology | 1986 |
| Norbert Perrimon | Harvard University | 2013 |
| Robert Palese Perry (died 2013) | Fox Chase Cancer Center | 1977 |
| Suzanne R. Pfeffer | Stanford University | 2024 |
| Lennart Philipson (died 2011) | Karolinska Institute | 1992 |
| Keith R. Porter (died 1997) | University of Pennsylvania | 1964 |
| Olivier Pourquié | Brigham and Women's Hospital | 2020 |
| David M. Prescott (died 2011) | University of Colorado at Boulder | 1974 |
| Martin C. Raff | University College London | 2003 |
| Anjana Rao | La Jolla Institute for Immunology | 2008 |
| Hans Ris (died 2004) | University of Wisconsin-Madison | 1974 |
| Elizabeth J. Robertson | University of Oxford | 2021 |
| Robert G. Roeder | Rockefeller University | 1988 |
| Michael Rosbash | Brandeis University | 2003 |
| Janet Rossant | University of Toronto | 2008 |
| James E. Rothman | Columbia University | 1993 |
| Francis H. Ruddle (died 2013) | Yale University | 1976 |
| Joan V. Ruderman | Harvard University | 1998 |
| David D. Sabatini | New York University | 1985 |
| David M. Sabatini | Massachusetts Institute of Technology | 2016 |
| Edward D. Salmon | University of North Carolina at Chapel Hill | 2021 |
| Alejandro Sánchez Alvarado | Stowers Institute for Medical Research | 2018 |
| Gordon H. Sato (died 2017) | Ministry of Fisheries of Eritrea | 1984 |
| John W. Saunders Jr. (died 2015) | State University of New York at Albany | 2006 |
| Randy Wayne Schekman | University of California, Berkeley | 1992 |
| Alexander F. Schier | University of Basel | 2020 |
| Sandra L. Schmid | Chan Zuckerberg Biohub | 2020 |
| Karl Patterson Schmidt (died 1957) | Field Museum | 1956 |
| Howard A. Schneiderman (died 1990) | Monsanto Company | 1975 |
| Gertrud M. Schüpbach | Princeton University | 2005 |
| Lucy Shapiro | Stanford University | 1994 |
| Phillip A. Sharp | Massachusetts Institute of Technology | 1983 |
| Aaron J. Shatkin (died 2012) | Rutgers University | 1981 |
| Philip Siekevitz (died 2009) | Rockefeller University | 1975 |
| Pamela A. Silver | Harvard University | 2023 |
| Kai Simons | Max Planck Institute for Molecular Cell Biology and Genetics | 1997 |
| Robert H. Singer | Albert Einstein College of Medicine | 2013 |
| S. J. Singer (died 2017) | University of California, San Diego | 1969 |
| Allan C. Spradling | Carnegie Institution for Science | 1989 |
| James A. Spudich | Stanford University | 1991 |
| Paul W. Sternberg | California Institute of Technology | 2009 |
| Charles Stockard (died 1939) | Cornell Medical College | 1922 |
| William Straus Jr. (died 1981) | Johns Hopkins University | 1962 |
| Susan Strome | University of California, Santa Cruz | 2019 |
| Gary Struhl | Columbia University | 2008 |
| Kevin Struhl | Harvard University | 2010 |
| Hewson Swift (died 2004) | The University of Chicago | 1971 |
| Clifford J. Tabin | Harvard University | 2007 |
| Masatoshi Takeichi | RIKEN | 2007 |
| Elly M. Tanaka | Institute of Molecular Biotechnology | 2023 |
| Edwin W. Taylor | Northwestern University | 2001 |
| Julie A. Theriot | University of Washington | 2021 |
| Irma Thesleff | University of Helsinki | 2017 |
| Shirley M. Tilghman | Princeton University | 1996 |
| Lewis G. Tilney | University of Pennsylvania | 1998 |
| Robert Tjian | University of California, Berkeley | 1991 |
| Ronald D. Vale | University of California, San Francisco | 2001 |
| K. VijayRaghavan | National Centre for Biological Sciences | 2014 |
| Salome G. Waelsch (died 2007) | Yeshiva University | 1979 |
| Clare M. Waterman | National Institutes of Health | 2018 |
| Fiona M. Watt | EMBO | 2019 |
| Paul A. Weiss (died 1989) | The University of Chicago | 1947 |
| Eric F. Wieschaus | Princeton University | 1994 |
| Vincent Wigglesworth (died 1994) | University of Cambridge | 1971 |
| Carroll M. Williams (died 1991) | Harvard University | 1960 |
| Simeon Burt Wolbach (died 1954) | Harvard Medical School | 1938 |
| Jerry L. Workman | Stowers Institute for Medical Research | 2025 |
| Joanna K. Wysocka | Stanford University | 2024 |
| Keith R. Yamamoto | University of California, San Francisco | 1990 |
| Yukiko Yamashita | Whitehead Institute for Biomedical Research | 2025 |
| Michael W. Young | The Rockefeller University | 2007 |
| Richard A. Young | Massachusetts Institute of Technology | 2012 |
| Junying Yuan | Chinese Academy of Sciences | 2017 |
| Kenneth Zaret | University of Pennsylvania | 2023 |
| Raymond E. Zirkle (died 1988) | The University of Chicago | 1959 |
