= Morgan Harris =

American cell biologist and rock climber (1916–2005)

- Born: May 25, 1916; St. Anthony, Idaho, U.S.
- Died: February 14, 2005 (aged 88); Oakland, California, U.S.
- Education: University of California, Berkeley (A.B., Ph.D.)
- Scientific career
- Fields: Cell biology
- Workplaces: University of California, Berkeley

Morgan Harris (May 25, 1916 – February 14, 2005) was an American cell biologist and professor at the University of California, Berkeley. His research using animal cell culture examined somatic-cell variation, drug resistance, and heritable changes in gene activity that did not result from changes in DNA sequence, an early contribution to the study of epigenetics. He was one of the founders of the American Society for Cell Biology.

Harris was also a rock climber in Yosemite Valley during the 1930s. He was credited with 14 first ascents in the valley, including the first ascent of the big wall climbing climb known as the Royal Arches Route, and he established several other routes with David Brower. Harris also first climbed the Shaky Leg Crack route on the east face of Mount Whitney.

== Early life, education, and academic career ==
Harris was born May 25, 1916, in St. Anthony, Idaho, and he grew up in Oakland, California. He formed a birdwatching club with classmates while in high school; the members continued to meet annually many decades later. He joined the Sierra Club as a teenager and learned roped climbing via its climbing community.

Harris entered UC Berkeley in the mid-1930s, receiving an A.B. in zoology from UC Berkeley in 1938. He completed a Ph.D. in embryology in three years, finishing in 1941, focused on the differentiation and growth of gastrular anlagen implanted into tadpoles.

In 1941, he left Berkeley for postdoctoral research at the University of Pennsylvania. He conducted two years of war-related research in aviation physiology.

Harris returned to UC Berkeley in 1945 as a faculty member in the Department of Zoology; he served as vice chair of that department from 1952 to 1957, and chair from 1957 to 1968. Although he retired in 1981, he became part of the newly-organized Department of Molecular and Cell Biology in 1991, staying active in research into the late 1990s.

Harris initially taught general zoology and comparative vertebrate anatomy despite having been hired as a cell biologist. He supervised a series of graduate students, including Frank Ruddle, who earned his Ph.D. in zoology with Harris in 1960 in mammalian cell culture and later became a pioneer of human gene mapping.

In 1964, Harris published Cell Culture and Somatic Variation. The book surveyed embryological development, microbial genetics, cell culture methods, chromosome variation, cellular nutrition, tumor production, and viral transformation.

== Research ==
Harris began studying animal cells in culture soon after his embryological research. In the 1950s, he investigated the cellular utilization of sugars, the role of bicarbonate, and the synergistic effects of growth factors in culture media. In the late 1950s and early 1960s, Harris developed toxicity tests for studying drug effects on cell growth, and analyzed chromosomes in cultured cells.

Some of Harris's experiments indicated that drug resistance in somatic animal cells could involve physiological adaptation in addition to genetic mutation. These mutant-like phenotypes in cell lines supported a non-mutational mechanism such as epigenetic inheritance. He found that variants for chemical resistance arose at a high frequency and were initially unstable, consistent with inactivation or silencing of genes rather than DNA mutations. In work published in 1982, Harris reported that Chinese hamster cells could undergo stable reactivation following treatment with 5-azacytidine and other non-mutagenic agents, supporting an epigenetic mechanism involving changes in DNA methylation. Much of his work focused on the epigenetic origin of long-term, heritable cellular change and gene activity.

== Professional service ==
In 1960, together with Don Fawcett, Keith Porter, Montrose Moses, Hans Ris, Hewson Swift, and J. Herbert Taylor, Harris was one of the founders of the American Society for Cell Biology. He co-organized its inaugural scientific meeting in Chicago in 1961, and served on the ASCB executive council from 1964 to 1968. Harris also served on the executive committee of the Federation of Cell Biologists, was the president of the Tissue Culture Association, and served as treasurer and an executive committee member of the International Society of Cell Biologists.

== Honors ==
- Guggenheim Fellowship at Cambridge University in Organismic Biology & Ecology (1960).
- Miller Institute Research Professorship at Berkeley (1963–1965).

== Rock climbing ==
As a teenager, Harris joined the Sierra Club Rock Climbing Section, one of the groups developing roped rock climbing and big wall climbing in California during the 1930s. In 1935, shortly after his nineteenth birthday, Harris and made the first ascent of Washington Column with Dick Leonard and Jack Riegelhuth. The route was called the Piton Traverse, but this original route is unknown today.

=== Royal Arches ===
Harris was one of the team that made the first ascent of the Royal Arches Route in Yosemite Valley, one of the Fifty Classic Climbs of North America. He studied the Royal Arches terrain from the valley floor with binoculars before attempting the route. After several earlier unsuccessful attempts, Harris and two companions completed the ascent in October 1936. They used what Harris called a "swinging rope traverse" to cross a blank section. They also crossed a section of the route, subsequently known as the Rotten Log, using a fallen tree trunk bridging a gap in the route; the log remained as part of the climb until it fell in 1984.

=== Other ascents ===
Together with David Brower, Harris made the first ascent of Cathedral Chimney, between the Higher and Middle Cathedral Rocks, shortly after the Royal Arches climb. Harris and Brower made the first ascent of Panorama Cliff the following day. Harris and Brower subsequently established nine additional Yosemite routes together, according to Steve Roper, including Yosemite Point Couloir and in May, 1940, the Circular Staircase on Sentinel Rock. In total, Harris was credited with 14 Yosemite Valley first ascents. He was also credited with establishing the Shaky Leg Crack route on the east face of Mount Whitney. Many of these routes were described in the 1954 edition of A Climber's Guide to the High Sierra.

=== Ansel Adams photograph ===
Harris frequently climbed with David Brower, and with the photographer Ansel Adams; Adams photographed Harris and Brower on a summit in the Minarets. The photograph appeared on the cover of the 1954 edition of A Climber's Guide to the High Sierra.

=== Later outdoor activities ===
Harris continued to backpack and ski after ending his major climbing period. On New Year's Day 1955, he helped rescue climber Allen Steck after Steck was buried in an avalanche near Lake Tahoe and was near death. In 1981, he served on a national committee preparing a master plan for Yosemite National Park. He was honored in the mid-1990s in a Yosemite retrospective that focused on early climbing pioneers. In later life, he became a birdwatcher and compiled a life list of nearly 2,500 bird species.

== Personal life ==
Harris was married to Marjorie Ruth Mason for 45 years; Mason died in 1985. One of their two sons, Ronald Harris-Warrick, a neurobiologist at Cornell University, and his wife endowed undergraduate support at UC Berkeley, the Morgan and Marjorie R. Harris Scholars Program; the program provides mentoring, research experience, and academic support to biology students from disadvantaged backgrounds. Harris married Lola Houston in 1989, and she survived him.

Harris died of pneumonia on February 14, 2005, at Kaiser Permanente Oakland Medical Center.
