= Annual Review of Cell and Developmental Biology =

- Discipline: Cell biology Developmental biology
- Language: English
- Edited by: Ruth Lehmann

Publication details
- Former name: Annual Review of Cell Biology
- History: 1985–present, 41 years old
- Publisher: Annual Reviews (US)
- Frequency: Annually
- Open access: Subscribe to Open
- Impact factor: 12.5 (2025)

Standard abbreviations
- ISO 4: Annu. Rev. Cell Dev. Biol.

Indexing
- CODEN: ARDBF8
- ISSN: 1081-0706 (print); 1530-8995 (web)

Links
- Journal homepage

The Annual Review of Cell and Developmental Biology is a peer-reviewed scientific journal published by Annual Reviews (AR) since 1985. It releases an annual volume of review articles relevant to the fields of cell biology and developmental biology. Its editor has been Ruth Lehmann since 2018. As of 2026, its impact factor is 12.5. As of 2023, Annual Review of Cell and Developmental Biology is being published as open access, under the Subscribe to Open model.

== History ==
Annual Reviews is a nonprofit organization whose stated mission is to synthesize knowledge "for the progress of science and the benefit of society." Scientists began to propose that AR add a journal title that published review articles relevant to cell biology as early as 1969. Marilyn Farquhar, the 1982 president of the American Society for Cell Biology, also thought such a journal would be useful. In 1983, Farquhar and other scientists met with AR to plan the topics and authors for the first volume. The Annual Review of Cell Biology published its first volume in 1985, with George E. Palade as the inaugural editor.

Beginning with the eleventh volume, published in 1995, the journal was published under its current name, the Annual Review of Cell and Developmental Biology. The title change was made to acknowledge that a third of the reviews published by the journal by that point dealt with developmental biology. As of 2021, it is published both in print and electronically. As of 2023, it is being published as open access, under the Subscribe to Open model.

== Scope and indexing ==
The Annual Review of Cell and Developmental Biology defines its scope as covering significant developments in the fields of developmental and cell biology. Included subfields are the organization of structures and functions within the cell, cell development, cell evolution for unicellular and multicellular organisms, molecular biology models, and research tools. Beginning in 2005, each volume starts with a prefatory chapter written by a prominent cell or developmental biologist in which they reflect upon their career and experiences. As of 2026, Journal Citation Reports lists the journal's impact factor as 12.5, ranking it first of 39 titles in the category "Developmental Biology" and twenty-sixth of 207 titles in the category "Cell Biology". It is abstracted and indexed in Scopus, Science Citation Index Expanded, MEDLINE, EMBASE, Chemical Abstracts Core, and Academic Search, among others.

== Editorial processes ==
The Annual Review of Cell and Developmental Biology is helmed by the editor or the co-editors. The editor is assisted by the editorial committee, which includes associate editors, regular members, and occasionally guest editors. Guest members participate at the invitation of the editor, and serve terms of one year. All other members of the editorial committee are appointed by the AR board of directors and serve five-year terms. The editorial committee determines which topics should be included in each volume and solicits reviews from qualified authors. Unsolicited manuscripts are not accepted. Peer review of accepted manuscripts is undertaken by the editorial committee.

=== Editors of volumes ===
Dates indicate publication years in which someone was credited as a lead editor or co-editor of a journal volume. The planning process for a volume begins well before the volume appears, so appointment to the position of lead editor generally occurred prior to the first year shown here. An editor who has retired or died may be credited as a lead editor of a volume that they helped to plan, even if it is published after their retirement or death.

- George E. Palade (1985–1993)
- James A. Spudich (1994–1998)
- Randy Schekman (1999–2017)
- Ruth Lehmann (2018–present)

=== Current editorial board ===
As of 2022, the editorial committee consists of the editor and the following members:

- Michael L. Dustin
- Hiroshi Hamada
- Alexander D. Johnson
- Nipam H. Patel
- Samara L. Reck-Peterson
- Erin M. Schuman
- Hao Yu.

As of 2022, it was composed by the following members:

- Jennifer Lippincott-Schwartz
- Alexander F. Schier
- Paola Arlotta
- Michael L. Dustin
- Alexander D. Johnson
- Erin M. Schuman
- Hao Yu
