= E.B. Wilson Medal =

The E.B. Wilson Medal is the American Society for Cell Biology's highest honor for science and is presented at the Annual Meeting of the Society for significant and far-reaching contributions to cell biology over the course of a career. It is named after Edmund Beecher Wilson.

== Medalists ==
Source : ASCB

- 1981 Daniel Mazia, George Palade and Keith Porter
- 1982 Charles Leblond and Alex B. Novikoff
- 1983 Joseph Gall and Hugh Huxley
- 1984 Harry Eagle and Theodore Puck
- 1985 Hewson Swift
- 1986 Gunter Blobel and David D. Sabatini
- 1987 Marilyn Farquhar
- 1988 Elizabeth Hay
- 1989 Christian de Duve
- 1990 Morris Karnovsky
- 1991 S. Jonathan Singer
- 1992 Shinya Inoue
- 1993 Hans Ris
- 1994 Barbara Gibbons and Ian R. Gibbons
- 1995 Bruce Nicklas
- 1996 Donald D. Brown
- 1997 John C. Gerhart
- 1998 James E. Darnell and Sheldon Penman
- 1999 Edwin Taylor
- 2000 Walter Neupert and Gottfried Schatz
- 2001 Elizabeth Blackburn
- 2002 Avram Hershko and Alexander Varshavsky
- 2003 Marc Kirschner
- 2004 Thomas D. Pollard
- 2005 Joan A. Steitz
- 2006 Joel Rosenbaum
- 2007 Richard O. Hynes and Zena Werb
- 2008 Martin Chalfie and Roger Tsien
- 2009 Peter Walter
- 2010 Stuart Kornfeld, James Rothman, and Randy Schekman
- 2011 Gary Borisy, J. Richard McIntosh, and James Spudich
- 2012 Susan Lindquist
- 2013 John R. Pringle
- 2014 William R. Brinkley, John E. Heuser and Peter Satir
- 2015 Elaine V. Fuchs
- 2016 Mina Bissell
- 2017 Franz-Ulrich Hartl and Arthur Horwich
- 2018 Barbara J. Meyer
- 2019 Peter N. Devreotes
- 2020 Jennifer Lippincott-Schwartz
- 2021 Pietro De Camilli
- 2022 Don W. Cleveland
- 2023 Tom Misteli
- 2024 Denise Montell
- 2025 Sandra Schmid

== See also ==
- List of medicine awards
