= James D. Jamieson =

American cell biologist and professor

James Douglas Jamieson (January 22, 1934 – October 22, 2018) was an American cell biologist and professor at the Yale School of Medicine. His early research in cell biology of pancreatic acinar cells in the lab of George Palade established the function of the Golgi apparatus in secretory protein trafficking.

== Early life and education ==
Jamieson was born in the small town of Armstrong, British Columbia on January 22, 1934. He attended the University of British Columbia for his undergraduate and medical educations. During medical school, Jamieson took a year off to conduct research, a novel idea for medical students at the time. He owes his interest in research and teaching to this experience with his first mentors, Sydney Friedman MD-PhD and Constance Friedman, PhD, who came to UBC in 1950 to found the Department of Anatomy at the new medical school. The focus of the Friedman's research was on hypertension and the role of the kidney and electrolyte balance in the maintenance of blood pressure. Jamieson continued his education at the Rockefeller University after receiving his MD (1960), earning his PhD in 1966 and completing his post-doctoral work with Nobel Laureate (1974) George Palade. Within six years of receiving his Ph.D., Jamieson was an associate professor of cell biology at the Rockefeller University. This was a scientifically prolific time at the Rockefeller; in addition to George Palade, Jamieson was associated with Keith Porter, Philip Siekevitz, Christian DeDuve, and many other distinguished scientists. In 1973, Jamieson left the Rockefeller with Dr. Palade to assist in founding the Section of Cell Biology at the Yale School of Medicine. Jamieson was promoted from Associate to Full Professor in 1975. The Section of Cell Biology became the Department of Cell Biology with Jamieson as its first chair (1983–1992). In March 2007, Dr. Jamieson assumed the Interim Chair of the department, a position he held until June 2008, when James Rothman became chair.

== Research ==
As a post-doctoral fellow, Jamieson established the role of the Golgi complex in the protein secretory pathway of pancreatic acinar cells, a seminal discovery of cell biology (Jamieson JD, Palade GE. Intracellular transport of secretory proteins in the pancreatic exocrine cell (I and II). J. Cell Biol. 1967:34:577-615).

Jamieson's laboratory at Yale further explored the regulation of exocytosis of secretory proteins, membrane biogenesis and polarity, and the interactions between the cell membrane and the basement membrane. His laboratory was also involved in the identification of the actin cytoskeleton as essential in the formation of endocytic vesicles in membrane retrieval after exocytosis. After more than 25 years of landmark research in cell biology, Jamieson closed his lab in 2001.

== Career ==
Jamieson was a tenured professor of Cell Biology at Yale University from 1975 until his death. In 1994, he became the Director of Medical Studies in the Department of Cell Biology. He also served as the Director of the Medical Scientist Training Program at Yale University School of Medicine for more than twenty years. He served as the president of the American Society for Cell Biology (1982–1983) and the president of the American Pancreatic Association (1989–1990). Jamieson has received many awards for his contributions to cell biology including a Distinguished Achievement Award from the American Gastroenterological Association and the William Go Award by American Pancreatic Association.

For his contributions to medical education, he received the Bohmfalk Prize for teaching excellence in basic sciences in 1999 and the teacher of the year award at the Yale University School of Medicine in 2005.

== Personal ==
Jamieson and his wife Cynthia had two daughters, Anne and Laura and five grandchildren: Christopher, Luke, Sofia, Grant, and Adam. He spent most summer weekends on his sailboat, the CYLAN II, or spending time at his house in Lake Sunapee. He was often spotted eating lunch with medical students of Yale and was always a favorite professor. He died on October 22, 2018, at the age of 84.
