= Brigid Hogan =

British biologist

Brigid L.M. Hogan
- Born: 1943 (age 82–83); London, England
- Education: University of Cambridge
- Known for: developmental biology; stem cell research
- Scientific career
- Fields: developmental biologist
- Workplaces: Duke University

Brigid L. M. Hogan FRS is a British developmental biologist noted for her contributions to mammalian development, stem cell research and transgenic technology and techniques. She is currently a Professor in the Department of Cell Biology at Duke University, Born in the UK, she became an American citizen in 2000.

Hogan earned her PhD in Biochemistry at the University of Cambridge and did postdoctoral work in the Department of Biology at MIT. She was the head of the Laboratory of Molecular Embryology at the National Institute for Medical Research in London, and later Hortense B. Ingram Professor in the Department of Cell Biology and a founding director of the Stem Cell and Organogenesis Program at Vanderbilt University. In 2002, she moved to Duke University.

Her work on mouse development led her to organize the first Molecular Embryology of the Mouse course at Cold Spring Harbor Laboratory and edit the first two editions of Manipulating the Mouse Embryo: A Laboratory Manual, considered the "Bible" of mammalian embryo manipulation techniques.

She has served as president of the American Society for Developmental Biology and the American Society for Cell Biology. She was a member of the National Advisory Council of the National Institute of Child Health and Human Development, Co-Chair for Science of the 1994 NIH Human Embryo Research Panel and a member of the 2001/2002 National Academies Panel on Scientific and Medical Aspects of Human Cloning. She was awarded the sixth International Society for Transgenic Technologies Prize in 2008 for "outstanding contributions to the field of transgene technologies". She delivered a 2011 Martin Rodbell Lecture, hosted by the National Institute of Environmental Health Sciences and the Croonian Lecture of the Royal Society of London in 2014.

== Early life ==
Hogan was born in Denham, a small village near London. Both of her parents were artists. As a child she faced the difficulties of post-World War II Britain. Her father, a stage designer, died in 1945 shortly after coming back from the front lines. Her single mother, a dressmaker, raised her and her sibling. She was a support and inspiration to Hogan. The village Hogan grew up in was close to nature and fostered her love for biology. Her rational scientific thinking helped her cope with her uncertain home life. She attended a High Wycombe High School for girls, where her biology teacher mentored her as she applied to Cambridge University. She was admitted to Newnham College, Cambridge's all-women's college, where she faced negative attitudes from male faculty due to her gender, typical of the time.

== Career ==
Since Cambridge offered no courses in cell or developmental biology at the time, Hogan did her post-doctorate work on sea urchin development with Paul Gross at MIT. Around 1974, back in Britain, Hogan began her work on mouse embryonic stem cells at the Mill Hill Labs of the Imperial Cancer Research Fund in London under director John Cairns. Encouraged by Anne McLaren, she focused her career on mouse development and has continued on this path ever since. She was the head of the Laboratory of Molecular Embryology at the Imperial Cancer Research Fund and then the National Institute of Medical Research in London. Her student, Peter Holland, became well known for his work on vertebrate evolution and was awarded the Darwin Medal of the Royal Society in 2019.

In 1988, she was recruited to Vanderbilt University Medical Center by Hal Moses. There she was a Professor of Cell Biology and Hortense B. Ingram Chair of Molecular Oncology, as well as the co-founder of the Stem Cell and Organogenesis Program. From 1993 to 2002, she was an Investigator of the Howard Hughes Medical Institute. At Vanderbilt University, she grew to appreciate the American enthusiasm towards scientific study in general and towards women in the scientific field in particular. She considers her work at Vanderbilt “one of the most productive and exciting” in her career. She left Vanderbilt in 2002 after 13 years to head the department of Cell Biology at Duke University Medical Center, making her the first woman to chair a basic sciences department there.

At Duke University, she was George Barth Geller Professor of Molecular Biology from 2002-2018 before stepping down as Chair in 2019. She continues to plan an active role in the Cell Biology Department and the Developmental and Stem Cell training program. Her lab studied the lung, due to it developing through "branching morphogenesis". To facilitate this, she created numerous mouse lines where genes can be manipulated in specific lung cells. She is particularly interested in the stem cells of the mouse lung as models for human lung cells that are often affected by disease. She hopes to apply her research to Chronic Obstructive Pulmonary Disease, cystic fibrosis, chronic asthma, pulmonary fibrosis, and premature babies with inadequate lung development.

== Awards and recognition ==
- 1986 – European Molecular Biology Organization member
- 1993–2002 – Howard Hughes Medical Institute Investigator
- 1996 – Institute of Medicine member
- 2001 – Fellow of the Royal Society
- 2001 – American Society for Developmental Biology President
- 2001 – American Academy of Arts and Sciences Fellow
- 2003 – American Association for the Advancement of Science member
- 2005 – National Academy of Sciences member
- 2008 – International Society for Transgenic Technologies Prize
- 2009 – American Society for Cell Biology President
- 2014 – Croonian Lecture
- 2015 – Lifetime Achievement Award, Society for Developmental Biology
- 2019 – Duke University Medical School Alumni 2019 Lifetime Achievement Award
- 2019 – FASEB Excellence in Science Lifetime Achievement Award

Preceded by Robert D. Goldman	American Society for Cell Biology Presidents; 2009	Succeeded by Incumbent
