= Peter Satir =

American microbiologist

- Born: 1937; U.S.
- Died: July 2022 (aged 84–85)
- Education: PhD
- Alma mater: Rockefeller University; Columbia University
- Known for: Studying the basis of motion by studying the Cilium
- Awards: E.B. Wilson Medal, 2014
- Scientific career
- Fields: Microbiology
- Institutions: Albert Einstein College of Medicine; University of Chicago; UC Berkeley

Peter Gerald Satir (c. 1937 – July 2022) is an American microbiologist who has spent his career studying the basis of motion by studying the cilium. He is a native of New York, graduated from the Bronx High School of Science in 1952, received his PhD from the Rockefeller University in 1961 and worked at the Department of Anatomy and Structural Biology at the Albert Einstein College of Medicine.

== Education ==
His interest in biology came from the first day in high school biology when he looked in a microscope, saw a Paramecium and asked his teacher how its cilia move. He says, "At the age of fourteen, I had asked the question which still dominates my research interests. Of course, I still had a long way to go to be a biologist."

After high school, he went to Columbia University where he was the only zoology major. He met his wife Birgit while studying in Denmark. After their marriage, they moved to Chicago, where they worked in Biology and Zoology at the University of Chicago. While not permitted to work under the same supervisor, they were permitted to work in the same department.

== Career ==
In 1967, Satir was appointed Associate Professor of Anatomy in Berkeley bringing experience in electron microscopy and modern cell biology to the department. They went to the Albert Einstein College of Medicine because it offers individual faculty positions to spouses.

== Awards ==
- 1972: he was awarded a Guggenheim Fellowship.
- 2005: he was awarded an honorary doctorate from the University of Copenhagen.
- 2014: he shared the E.B. Wilson Medal of the American Society for Cell Biology.
