= Microtrabeculae =

Hypothesized fourth element of the cytoskeleton

In cell biology, microtrabeculae were a hypothesised fourth element of the cytoskeleton (the other three being microfilaments, microtubules and intermediate filaments), proposed by Keith Porter based on images obtained from high-voltage electron microscopy of whole cells in the 1970s. The images showed short, filamentous structures of unknown molecular composition associated with known cytoplasmic structures. It is now generally accepted that microtrabeculae are nothing more than an artifact of certain types of fixation treatment, although the complexity of the cell's cytoskeleton is not yet fully understood.
