= Montrose James Moses =

American cell biologist (1919–2011)

- Born: June 26, 1919; New York City, US
- Died: September 26, 2011 (aged 92); Durham, North Carolina, US
- Education: Bates College (B.S.); Columbia University (M.A., Ph.D.)
- Known for: Characterization of the synaptonemal complex
- Awards: Fellow of the American Association for the Advancement of Science
- Scientific career
- Fields: Cell biology, cytogenetics
- Workplaces: Brookhaven National Laboratory; Rockefeller Institute for Medical Research; Duke University School of Medicine

Montrose James Moses (June 26, 1919 – September 26, 2011) was an American cell biologist known as one of the first scientists to describe the synaptonemal complex, a protein structure associated with chromosome pairing during meiosis. He was a professor at the Duke University School of Medicine, a founder and early officer of the American Society for Cell Biology, and the society's eighth president.

== Early life and education ==
Moses was born June 26, 1919, in New York City, the son of writer Montrose Jonas Moses and actress Dorothy H. Moses. He attended high school in Winsted, Connecticut, where he developed interests in biology, microscopy, and electronics. Moses received a B.S. in biology from Bates College in 1941, an M.A. in zoology from Columbia University in 1942 and a Ph.D. in 1949 in zoology, specializing in cytochemistry.

Moses served in the United States Army from July 1942 to March 1946, having attained the rank of captain; during his military service, Moses was responsible for radio-telephone operations for General Headquarters in the Southwest Pacific Area. As a graduate student, he helped construct a microspectrophotometer used to quantify nucleic acids and proteins within cell organelles.

== Career and research ==
Moses worked at Brookhaven National Laboratory from 1948 to 1957 as a cytochemist. He conducted quantitative analyses of nucleoproteins in individual cells and parts of cells from normal and irradiated tissues. During this time, he also worked at the Rockefeller Institute for Medical Research, including in the laboratory of Keith R. Porter. His Rockefeller research involved cytology, electron microscopy, and cytochemistry of the nucleus and chromosomes, including the correlation of light- and electron-microscopy images.

Moses's work published in 1956 described his observations and discovery of the synaptonemal complex, from an examination of crayfish spermatocytes by electron microscopy. He characterized an axial structure associated with paired chromosomes during meiosis. Don Fawcett independently reported related observations. Moses continued studying the structure, composition, and function of the synaptonemal complex throughout his career.

In 1959, Moses joined the Department of Anatomy at the Duke University School of Medicine as an associate professor. He was promoted to professor in 1966 and appointed the R. J. Reynolds Professor in Medical Education in 1981. He served as vice chair of the Department of Anatomy from 1987 to 1988 and joined Duke's Department of Cell Biology when it was established in 1988. His research at Duke included chromosome ultrastructure, meiosis, the synaptonemal complex, cytogenetics, chromosome mechanics, and analytical light and electron microscopy. He authored more than 100 scientific publications, according to the Duke archives.

Moses was elected a fellow of the American Association for the Advancement of Science (1955).

In 2006, the Gordon Research Conference on meiosis marked the fiftieth anniversary of the discovery of the synaptonemal complex with an introductory presentation by Moses.

== American Society for Cell Biology ==
Moses was a member of the group led by Keith Porter that organized the American Society for Cell Biology in 1960. He was appointed associate secretary of the Provisional Executive Committee in 1961 and subsequently served as one of the society's first secretaries, from 1962 to 1967. He served as the eighth president of the ASCB in 1968–1969. During his presidency, Moses proposed that the society make a case for the public importance of cell biology and the importance of federal support of research; the resulting discussion led the ASCB Council to establish a Committee on Public Policy.

== Selected publications ==
- Moses, Montrose J. (1956). "Chromosomal structures in crayfish spermatocytes". Journal of Biophysical and Biochemical Cytology. 2 (2): 215–218. doi:10.1083/jcb.2.2.215. PMC 2223961. PMID 13319383.
- Moses, Montrose J. (1958). "The relation between the axial complex of meiotic prophase chromosomes and chromosome pairing in a salamander (Plethodon cinereus)". Journal of Biophysical and Biochemical Cytology. 4 (5): 633–638. doi:10.1083/jcb.4.5.633. PMC 2224561. PMID 13587560.
- Moses, Montrose J. (1969). "Structure and function of the synaptonemal complex". Genetics. 61 (1 Suppl): 41–51. PMID 5345399.
- Moses, Montrose J.; Counce, Sheila J.; Paulson, D. F. (31 January 1975). "Synaptonemal complex complement of man in spreads of spermatocytes, with details of the sex chromosome pair". Science. 187 (4174): 363–365. doi:10.1126/science.187.4174.363. PMID 1111110.
