= Albert Claude =

Belgian-American cell biologist (1899–1983)

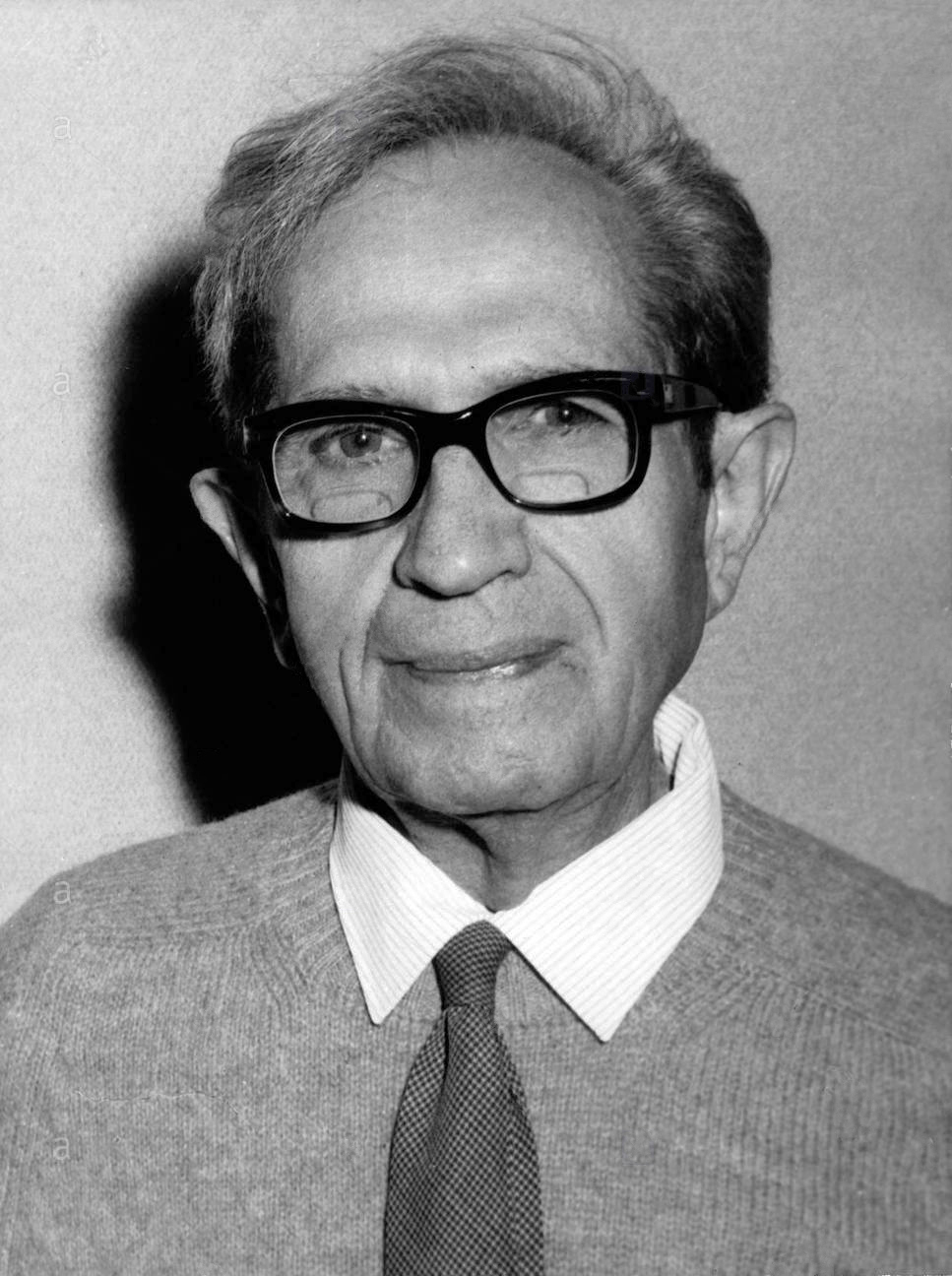
- Born: 24 August 1899; Longlier, Neufchâteau, Belgium
- Died: 22 May 1983 (aged 83); Brussels, Belgium
- Citizenship: Belgium and United States
- Education: University of Liège
- Known for: Cell fractionation Electron microscopy in biology
- Spouse: Julia Gilder
- Children: Philippa
- Parents: Florentin Joseph Claude (father); Marie-Glaudice Watriquant Claude (mother)
- Awards: Louisa Gross Horwitz Prize in 1970; Paul Ehrlich and Ludwig Darmstaedter Prize in 1971; Nobel Prize in Physiology or Medicine in 1974
- Scientific career
- Fields: Cell biology
- Workplaces: Rockefeller University; Institut Jules Bordet; Université libre de Bruxelles; Université catholique de Louvain

Albert Claude (French pronunciation: [albɛʁ klod]; 24 August 1899 – 22 May 1983) was a Belgian-American cell biologist and medical doctor who shared the Nobel Prize in Physiology or Medicine in 1974 with Christian de Duve and George Emil Palade. His elementary education started in a comprehensive primary school at Longlier, his birthplace. He served in the British Intelligence Service during the First World War, and got imprisoned in concentration camps twice. In recognition of his service, he was granted enrolment at the University of Liège in Belgium to study medicine without any formal education required for the course. He earned his Doctor of Medicine degree in 1928. Devoted to medical research, he initially joined German institutes in Berlin. In 1929 he found an opportunity to join the Rockefeller Institute in New York. At Rockefeller University he made his most groundbreaking achievements in cell biology. In 1930 he developed the technique of cell fractionation, by which he discovered the agent of the Rous sarcoma, as well as components of cell organelles such as the mitochondrion, chloroplast, endoplasmic reticulum, Golgi apparatus, ribosome, and lysosome. He was the first to employ the electron microscope in the field of biology. In 1945 he published the first detailed structure of cell. His collective works established the complex functional and structural properties of cells.

Claude served as director at Jules Bordet Institute for Cancer Research and Treatment and Laboratoire de Biologie Cellulaire et Cancérologie in Louvain-la-Neuve; Professor at the Free University of Brussels, the University of Louvain, and Rockefeller University. For his pioneering works he received the Louisa Gross Horwitz Prize in 1970, together with his student George Palade and Keith Porter, the Paul Ehrlich and Ludwig Darmstaedter Prize in 1971, and the Nobel Prize in Physiology or Medicine in 1974 with Palade and his friend Christian de Duve.

== Early life and education ==
Albert Claude was born in 1899 (but according to civil register 1898) in Longlier, a hamlet in Neufchâteau, Belgium, to Florentin Joseph Claude and Marie-Glaudice Watriquant Claude. He was the youngest among three brothers and one sister. His father was a Paris-trained baker and ran a bakery-cum-general store at Longlier valley near railroad station. His mother, who developed breast cancer in 1902, died when he was seven years old. He spent his pre-school life with his ailing mother. He started education in Longlier Primary School, a pluralistic school of single room, mixed grades, and all under one teacher. In spite of the inconveniences, he remarked the education system as "excellent." He served as a bell boy, ringing the church bell every morning at 6. Due to economic depression the family moved to Athus, a prosperous region with steel mills, in 1907. He entered German-speaking school. After two years he was asked to look after his uncle who was disabled with cerebral haemorrhage in Longlier. He dropped out of school and practically nursed his uncle for several years. At the outbreak of the First World War he was apprenticed to steel mills and worked as an industrial designer. Inspired by Winston Churchill, then British Minister of War, he joined the resistance and volunteered in British Intelligence Service in which he served during the whole war. At the end of the war he was decorated with the Interallied Medal along with veteran status. He then wanted to continue education. Since he had no formal secondary education, particularly required for medicine course, such as in Greek and Latin, he tried to join School of Mining in Liège. By that time Marcel Florkin became head of the Direction of Higher Education in Belgium's Ministry of Public Instruction, and under his administration passed the law that enabled war veterans to pursue higher education without diploma or other examinations. As an honour to his war service, he was given admission to the University of Liège in 1922 to study medicine. He obtained his degree of Doctor of Medicine in 1928.

== Career ==
Claude received travel grants from Belgian government for his doctoral thesis on the transplantation of mouse cancers into rats. With this he worked his postdoctoral research in Berlin during the winter of 1928–1929, first at the Institut für Krebsforschung, and then at the Kaiser Wilhelm Institute for Biology, Dahlem, in the laboratory of tissues culture of Prof. Albert Fischer. Back in Belgium he received fellowship in 1929 from the Belgian American Educational Foundation (Commission for Relief in Belgium, CRB) for research in the United States. He applied for the Rockefeller Institute (now the Rockefeller University) in New York, USA. Simon Flexner, then Director, accepted his proposal to work on the isolation and identification of the Rous sarcoma virus. In September 1929 he joined the Rockefeller Institute. In 1930, he discovered the process of cell fractionation, which was groundbreaking in his time. The process consists of grinding up cells to break the membrane and release the cell's contents. He then filtered out the cell membranes and placed the remaining cell contents in a centrifuge to separate them according to mass. He divided the centrifuged contents into fractions, each of a specific mass, and discovered that particular fractions were responsible for particular cell functions. In 1938 he identified and purified for the first time component of Rous sarcoma virus, the causal agent of carcinoma, as "ribose nucleoprotein" (eventually named RNA). He was the first to use electron microscope to study biological cells. Earlier electron microscopes were used only in physical researches. His first electron microscopic study was on the structure of mitochondria in 1945. He was given American citizenship in 1941. He discovered that mitochondria are the "power houses" of all cells. He also discovered cytoplasmic granules full of RNA and named them "microsomes", which were later renamed ribosomes, the protein synthesizing machineries of cell. With his associate, Keith Porter, he found a "lace-work" structure that was eventually proven to be the major structural feature of the interior of all eukaryotic cells. This was the discovery of endoplasmic reticulum (a Latin for "fishnet").

In 1949, he became Director of the Jules Bordet Institute for Cancer Research and Treatment (Institut Jules Bordet) and Professor at the Faculty of Medicine of the Free University of Brussels, where he was emeritus in 1971.
In the mid sixties during an Electron Microscopy symposium in (Bratislava)-(Czechoslovakia) organized by the (UNESCO) at the Czechoslovak Academy of Sciences, he meets young scientist Dr. Emil Mrena who was at that time head of the Electron Microscopy department. He invited him to come and work with him in Brussels, making it possible for Dr. Mrena's family to escape the communist regime. Their close collaboration gave fruition to 5 publications from 1969 to 1974. With the support of his colleague and friend Christian de Duve, he became in 1972 Professor at the University of Louvain (Université catholique de Louvain) and Director of the "Laboratoire de Biologie Cellulaire et Cancérologie" in Louvain-la-Neuve where he moved with Dr. Emil Mrena as sole collaborator. At the same time, he was appointed Professor at the Rockefeller University, an institution with which he had remained connected, in different degrees, since 1929.

== Personal life ==
He married Julia Gilder in 1935, with whom he had a daughter, Philippa. They were divorced while he was at Rockefeller. Philippa became a neuroscientist and married Antony Stretton.

Claude was known to be a bit of an eccentric and had close friendship with painters, including Diego Rivera and Paul Delvaux, and musicians such as Edgard Varèse.

After his retirement in 1971 from the Université libre de Bruxelles and from the directorship of the Institut Jules Bordet, he continued his research at the University of Louvain with his collaborator Dr. Emil Mrena, who ended up resigning in 1977 due to decreasing activity of the Laboratory, moving to other research works. It is said that he continued his research in seclusion until he died of natural causes, at his home in Brussels, on Sunday night on 22 May 1983, but he had stopped visiting his own laboratory in Louvain already in 1976 due to his weak health.

== Awards and recognitions ==
- Baron Holvoet Prize of the Fonds National de la Recherche Scientifique of Belgium in 1965
- Louisa Gross Horwitz Prize in 1970 from Columbia University
- Paul Ehrlich and Ludwig Darmstaedter Prize in 1971
- Nobel Prize in Physiology or Medicine in 1974 with Palade and de Duve "for their discoveries concerning the structural and functional organization of the cell"
- Medal of the Belgian Academy of Medicine
- Member of the Royal Academies for Science and the Arts of Belgium
- Member of the French Academy of Sciences
- Honorary member of the American Academy of Arts and Sciences
- Order of the Palmes Académiques of France
- Grand Cordon of the Order of Léopold II
- Honorary doctorates from the universities of Modena, Brno, Liège, Louvain, Gent, and the Rockefeller University.
