= Mary Munson =

American biologist

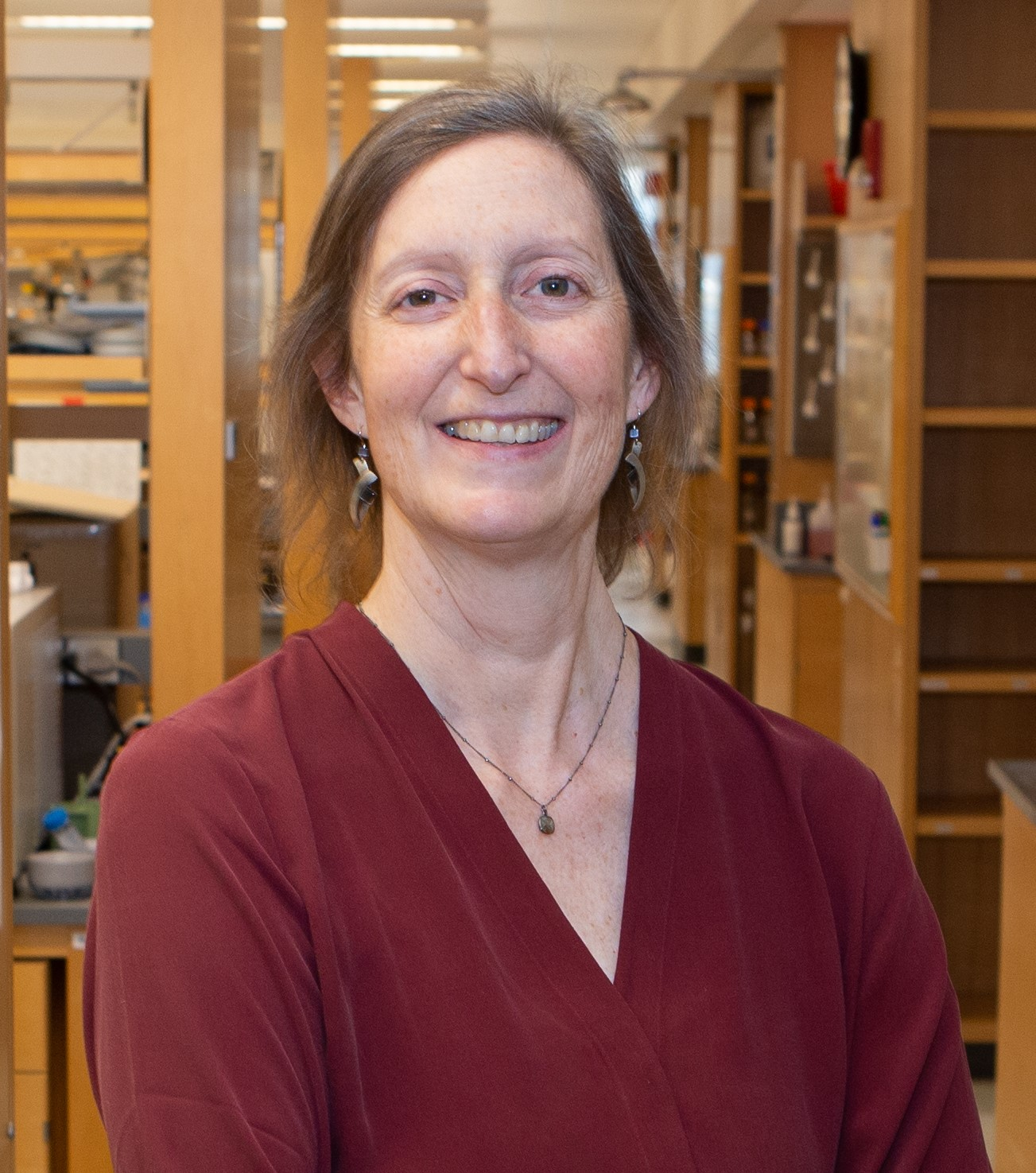
- Mary Munson, standing in her laboratory
- Education: A.B. Washington University in St. Louis 1989; Ph.D. Yale University 1996; Postdoc Princeton University
- Scientific career
- Fields: cell biology biochemistry structural biology
- Workplaces: UMass Chan Medical School
- Website: Mary Munson lab

Mary Munson is an American biologist who is a professor of biochemistry & molecular biotechnology and Associate Vice Provost for Equity in Science at UMass Chan Medical School. Her research investigates regulation of membrane trafficking in cells, and in particular how membrane-bound vesicles dock with target compartments with spatial and temporal specificity. She is also active in improving the culture of science.

== Education and training ==
Munson was a double major in Chemistry and Biology at Washington University in St. Louis. She completed her Ph.D. in Lynne Regan's lab at Yale University in Molecular Biophysics and Biochemistry with a thesis entitled, "The role of hydrophobic core packing in the structure and stability of the four-helix-bundle protein Rop". She completed postdoctoral research on regulation of SNARE assembly and disassembly in Fred Hughson's lab at Princeton University, supported by an NIH National Research Service Award and an American Heart Association fellowship.

== Research and career ==
Munson runs a research lab that investigates regulation of membrane trafficking, using yeast and mammalian cells and applying techniques of biochemistry, structural biology, cell biology, and biophysics. The lab's research has uncovered mechanisms of exocytosis and endocytosis with both basic science and medical relevance. The lab's research is supported by the National Institutes of Health.

Munson was appointed to the faculty at the UMass Chan Medical School in 2001. She was appointed as Vice Chair in the Department of Biochemistry & Molecular Biotechnology in 2021, as UMass Chan Medical School's Assistant Vice Provost for Health Equity in 2022, and as Associate Vice Provost for Equity in Science, Office of Health Equity in 2024. She has served as faculty advisor for UMass Chan's student chapter of the Society for Advancement of Chicanos/Hispanics and Native Americans in Science, or SACNAS.

Munson was elected as the 2025 President of the American Society for Cell Biology, where she has also served as co-chair of the ASCB's Women in Cell Biology committee and co-investigator of the Maximizing Opportunities for Scientific and Academic Independent Careers, or MOSAIC, program for select K99/R00 scholars.
