= Montrose Jonas Moses =

American writer (1878–1934)

- Born: September 2, 1878; New York City, US
- Died: March 29, 1934 (aged 55); New York City, US
- Education: City College of New York
- Occupations: Writer, editor, drama critic
- Children: Montrose
- Relatives: James A. Herne (father-in-law)

Montrose Jonas Moses (September 2, 1878 – March 29, 1934) was an American writer, born in New York, where he graduated from the City College in 1899.

== Biography ==
In the main, Moses' compositions were directed towards children's literature; however, he composed some books for adults, as well. Between 1900 and 1921, he was connected editorially with, or was a contributor to, various periodicals: the Literary Digest, the Reader, the Independent, the Book News Monthly, and Hearst's International. Besides editing the Green Room Book and the Anglo-American Dramatic Register and making some translations from the French, he wrote: Famous Actor Families in America (1906); Children's Books and Reading (1907); Henrik Ibsen (1908); The Literature of the South (1909); The American Dramatist (1911); Maurice Maeterlinck: A Study (1911). He edited Representative Plays by American Dramatists: 1856–1911 (1920). In 1933, he was appointed a professor of books at the Barnard School for Boys in New York.

Moses was a friend of Harry Houdini.

Moses married Dorothy Herne, a daughter of playwright James A. Herne, in 1911. After Dorothy's death in 1921, Moses married Leah Agnes Houghtaling in 1923. He and his first wife had a son, Montrose James Moses, who became a professor of anatomy and cell biology at Duke University Hospital. He died on March 29, 1934, aged 55, at his home in New York City, from a intracerebral hemorrhage after suffering two strokes.
