= William R. Brinkley =

American biologist

William R. "Bill" Brinkley, was an American cellular biologist and scientific advocate and served as a Professor and Dean of the Graduate School of Biomedical Sciences at Baylor College of Medicine. Brinkley was recognized particularly for contributing to discovery of the attachment of chromosomes to the mitotic spindle apparatus.

== Biography ==
Brinkley earned his undergraduate degree in general biology from Sam Houston State University, where he later taught biology and maintained the school's small natural history museum. He then earned a master's degree in biology, under Dr. James "Jimmy" Long, working with mosquitoes. He earned his PhD in the lab of John H. D. Bryan at Iowa State University in 1964, followed by NIH post-doctoral training with Tao-Chiuh Hsu at The University of Texas MD Anderson Cancer Center and an assistant and associate professor of biology until 1972, when he accepted a position as Professor and Director of Cell Biology in the Department of Human Biological Chemistry at the University of Texas Medical Branch at Galveston, Texas.

In 1966, Brinkley was the first to characterize and visualize the kinetochore, a complex protein structure that guides chromosomes to split evenly between daughter cells during mitosis and meiosis. He continues to make key contributions in cellular replication and developmental biology, and was honored in a dedicated FASEB meeting titled the "Brinkley-Fest of Mitosis" in 2007. Brinkley died on 10 November 2020, at the age of 84.

== Research focus ==
Brinkley is attempting to uncover the molecular basis of errors and defects in the nucleus and mitotic apparatus that cause aneuploidy.

== Memberships and awards ==
Brinkley has served on numerous journal editorial boards including Journal of Cell Biology and Cell. He briefly served as president of the American Society for Cell Biology (1979–1980). He was the recipient of a Merit Award from the National Institutes of Health, National Cancer Institute, for his research on cell division and genomic instability in tumor cells. He served as President of Federation of American Societies for Experimental Biology from 1998 to 1999.He currently serves on the board of the Genetics Policy Institute. He was a member of the Institute of Medicine and is recognized as a Distinguished Alumnus from Sam Houston State University, Iowa State University, and The University of Texas M. D. Anderson Cancer Center. In 2014, he received the highest honor from the American Society for Cell Biology, the E.B. Wilson Medal.

== Scientific Lineage ==
- Neurotree Lineage
