= José-Antonio Campos-Ortega =

Spanish neurobiologist (1940–2004)

- Born: August 22, 1940; Valencia, Spain
- Died: May 8, 2004 (aged 63)
- Education: University of Valencia
- Scientific career
- Fields: Neurobiology
- Notable students: Ruth Lehmann

Notes
- Birth

José-Antonio Campos-Ortega (22 August 1940 – 8 May 2004) was a Spanish neurobiologist born in Valencia, Spain shortly after the Spanish Civil War. He was known as a pioneer of developmental-genetic studies of early neurogenesis.

Campos-Ortega attended a Dominican religious school for his secondary education (roughly ages 12 to 16). In 1958 (at 18) he started studying medicine, which had been a tradition in his family and a financial necessity in Spain of the period; this pursuit was at the cost of setting aside his burgeoning interest in histology and research.
