= Clifford Grobstein =

American biologist and cancer researcher

- Born: July 20, 1916; New York
- Died: September 6, 1998 (aged 82)
- Education: City College of New York, UCLA
- Known for: Work on cancer and developmental biology
- Awards: National Academy of Sciences, National Academy of Medicine, American Academy of Arts and Sciences
- Scientific career
- Fields: Biology, cancer research
- Institutions: UC San Diego

Clifford Grobstein (July 20, 1916 – September 6, 1998) was an American biologist, a cancer researcher, a member of the National Academies of Sciences.

== Early life and education ==
On July 20, 1916, Grobstein was born in New York City, New York. He graduated from the City College of New York in 1936 with a B.S. degree in biology. He received his M.S. and Ph.D. degrees in zoology from the University of California at Los Angeles.

== Career ==
Grobstein was the chairman of the biology department and the dean of the school of medicine at the University of California at San Diego. He was also a member of the National Academy of Medicine and the American Academy of Arts and Sciences. The New York Times said that Grobstein "made important contributions to the study of cancer and of developmental biology." He is also known and respected by his fellow scientists for raising and framing ethical questions dealing with applications of the experimental biology. The National Academies Press said he "was a leading American developmental biologist of the last half of the twentieth century".

== Rewards and distinctions ==
- 1966 - elected to the National Academy of Sciences
- elected to the National Academy of Medicine
- elected to the American Academy of Arts and Sciences
- the Brachet Medal by the Belgium Royal Society
- the Anniversary Medal from City College of New York
