= American Society for Cell Biology =

Professional scientific society

The American Society for Cell Biology
- Founded: 1960
- Location: Rockville, Maryland
- Members: 7,000
- Key people: Erika Holzbaur (President), Martin Chalfie (Past President), Sandra Ann Murray (President-Elect), Rebecca Alvania (Chief Executive Officer), A. Malcolm Campbell (Treasurer), Kerry Bloom (Secretary)
- Website: www.ascb.org

The American Society for Cell Biology (ASCB) is a professional society that was founded in 1960.

== History ==
On 6 April 1959 the United States National Academy of Sciences passed a resolution for the establishment of a "national society of cell biology to act as a national representative to the International Federation for Cell Biology".

The ASCB was first organized at an ad hoc meeting in the office of Keith R. Porter at Rockefeller University on May 28, 1960. In the 1940s, Porter was one of the first scientists in the world to use the then-revolutionary technique of electron microscopy (EM) to reveal the internal structure of cells. Other early ASCB leaders—George Palade, Don Fawcett, Hewson Swift, Arthur Solomon, Montrose Moses, and Hans Ris—also were EM pioneers. All early ASCB leaders were concerned that existing scientific societies and existing biology journals were not receptive to this emerging field that studied the cell as the fundamental unit of all life.

The ASCB was legally incorporated in New York State on July 31, 1961. A call for membership went out, enlisting ASCB's first 480 members. The first ASCB Annual Meeting was held November 2–4, 1961, in Chicago, where 844 attendees gathered for three days of lectures, slides, and movies showing cellular structure. The results of a mail ballot were read out and Fawcett was declared ASCB's first president.

The ASCB did not remain an EM society. New technologies and new discoveries in molecular biology, genetics, biochemistry, and light microscopy quickly widened the field. Cell biology has continued to expand ever since, extending its impact on clinical medicine and pharmacology while drawing on new technologies in bioengineering, high-resolution imaging, massive data handling, and genomic sequencing.

By 1963, the membership consisted of 9,000 scientists. In 2008 it was reported that ASCB had 11,000 members worldwide. Today, 25% of ASCB members work outside the United States). Annual meetings now draw upwards of 5,000 people. Since 1960, 32 past or current ASCB members have won Nobel Prizes in medicine or in chemistry.

== Publications ==
Print publications:

- Molecular Biology of the Cell: An online journal of scholarly research reports and essays published 24 times a year.
- CBE- Life Sciences Education: An online peer-reviewed journal of life science education research and evidence-based practice.
- ASCB Newsletter: The ASCB's bi-monthly online newsletter updating members and policymakers on issues, public policy, society programs and events, grants, career advice, and more.

Online publication:

- The ASCB Post: The latest in science news, insights, and blogs.

== Annual meeting ==
Typically held within the first two weeks of December, the ASCB's annual meeting brings together scientists in the field of cell biology to highlight the latest research, techniques, products, and services, providing a venue for networking and career advice, offering research-tested educational approaches for high school teachers and professors who teach undergraduates, and to spur future discovery and collaboration. The ASCB also presents awards, poster sessions (where students, postdoctoral fellows, and independent scientists present their research and receive feedback), scientific sessions (symposia, minisymposia, working groups, workshops, translational sessions, special interest subgroups, award lectures, and exhibits). Science discussion tables offer opportunities to discuss scientific topics with expert scientists, and the career discussion roundtables offer a variety of career topic-themed tables addressed with expert facilitators. In addition, special sessions focus on advocacy, media and public outreach, and special issues of interest to women, minorities, gay, lesbian, and transgender students/scientists, the media, etc.

The 2012 meeting resulted in the San Francisco Declaration on Research Assessment.

== Awards ==
- ASCB Fellows
- E.B. Wilson Medal
- Keith R. Porter Lecture
- Women in Cell Biology Junior Award for Excellence in Research
- The Sandra K. Masur Senior Leadership Award
- ASCB Prize for Excellence in Inclusivity
- E.E. Just Lecture
- MBC Paper of the Year
- Bruce Alberts Award for Excellence in Science Education
- Günter Blobel Early Career Award
- Merton Bernfield Memorial Award
- Norton B. Gilula Award
- ASCB Public Service Award
- Innovation in Research Award
- Innovation in Education Award
- Porter Prizes for Excellence in Research

== Presidents ==
The following people have been elected president of the ASCB:

- 1962: Don W. Fawcett (first President)
- 1963: Alex B. Novikoff
- 1964: Hewson Swift
- 1965: Van Potter
- 1966: David M. Prescott
- 1967: Philip Siekevitz
- 1968: Joseph G. Gall
- 1969: Montrose Moses
- 1970: J. Herbert Taylor
- 1971: Saul Kit
- 1972: Daniel Mazia
- 1973: Jean-Paul Revel
- 1974: T.C. Hsu
- 1975: George Pappas
- 1976: George Palade
- 1977: Elizabeth Hay
- 1978: Keith Porter
- 1979: David Sabatini
- 1980: Bill R. Brinkley
- 1981: Helen A. Padykula
- 1982: Marilyn Farquhar
- 1983: James D. Jamieson
- 1984: Morris Karnovsky
- 1985: Daniel Branton
- 1986: Mary-Lou Pardue
- 1987: Frank Ruddle
- 1988: Thomas D. Pollard
- 1989: James Spudich
- 1990: Gunter Blobel
- 1991: Marc Kirschner
- 1992: Donald D. Brown
- 1993: Susan Gerbi
- 1994: J. Richard McIntosh
- 1995: Ursula Goodenough
- 1996: J. Michael Bishop
- 1997: Mina Bissell
- 1998: Elizabeth Blackburn
- 1999: Randy Schekman
- 2000: Richard Hynes
- 2001: Elaine Fuchs
- 2002: Gary Borisy
- 2003: Suzanne Pfeffer
- 2004: Harvey Lodish
- 2005: Zena Werb
- 2006: Mary Beckerle
- 2007: Bruce Alberts
- 2008: Robert D. Goldman
- 2009: Brigid Hogan
- 2010: Timothy Mitchison
- 2011: Sandra Schmid
- 2012: Ronald Vale
- 2013: Don Cleveland
- 2014: Jennifer Lippincott-Schwartz
- 2015: Shirley M. Tilghman
- 2016: Peter Walter
- 2017: Pietro De Camilli
- 2018: Jodi Nunnari
- 2019: Andrew W. Murray
- 2020: Eva Nogales
- 2021: Ruth Lehmann
- 2022: Martin Chalfie
- 2023: Erika Holzbaur
- 2024: Sandra A. Murray
- 2025: Mary Munson
- 2026: Rong Li

== Committees ==
- The Education Committee focuses on promoting biology education, science literacy, and career development in biology-related fields, honoring educators Bruce Alberts Award for Excellence in Science Education, educating educators through sessions at the ASCB Annual Meeting including the Education Initiative Forum, Education Minisymposium, Education workshop on undergraduate teaching, K–12 Science Education (for local high school students and teachers), and developing careers.
- The Finance And Audit Committee, chaired by the treasurer, is responsible for evaluating the financial status of the Society, reviewing expenditures and recommending the annual budgets, reserve funds, and investments. The committee consists of three or more members of the Society and two ex officio members - the president and president-elect.
- The major objectives of the International Affairs Committee are to broaden the base of the society's international efforts by working with national cell biology societies and coordinating international activities; facilitating exchange between U.S. and international scientists; increasing cell biology training and capacity worldwide; and increasing international membership and satisfaction in the ASCB.
- The Membership Committee, chaired by the secretary, reviews and recommends policies related to membership retention and growth.
- The Minorities Affairs Committee seeks to significantly support underrepresented minority scientists in all stages of their education and career.
- The Program Committee develops the scientific program for the annual meeting, which is generally held in late Fall/early Winter.
- The Public Information Committee promotes education of the lay public in cell biology, directly and through the media.
- The Public Policy Committee regularly educates the United States Congress and the administration about the importance of basic biomedical funding and biomedical policy.
- The Committee for Postdocs and Students represents young scientists. They are dedicated to providing a forum for student and postdoc members to identify and address topics that are essential to their success. They strive to uphold the values and advance the goals of ASCB by promoting the active participation of students and postdocs in the scientific community and maximizing their effectiveness.
- The major objective of the Women in Cell Biology Committee is to provide opportunities and information useful to women and men in developing their careers in cell biology. The committee also provides career development advice of value to all basic biomedical scientists.
- The Cell: An Image Library is a comprehensive, easily accessible, public resource database of images, videos, and animations of cells from a variety of organisms, showcasing as well cell components and functions. The database will advance research on cellular activity with the ultimate goal of improving human health.

== San Francisco Declaration on Research Assessment ==
At the American Society for Cell Biology meeting in San Francisco in 2012, scientists developed the Declaration on Research Assessment, which calls for scientific output to be measured accurately and evaluated wisely.

It also calls for scientists and institutions to reevaluate the use of impact factor to assess individual scientific efforts .
