= Italian Journal of Anatomy and Embryology =

- Discipline: Anatomy, embryology
- Language: English
- Edited by: Domenico Ribatti

Publication details
- History: 1901-present
- Publisher: Firenze University Press
- Frequency: Quarterly

Standard abbreviations
- ISO 4: Ital. J. Anat. Embryol.

Indexing
- CODEN: IEMBEF
- ISSN: 1122-6714 (print); 2038-5129 (web)

Links
- Journal homepage; Online access

The Italian Journal of Anatomy and Embryology (sometimes abbreviated as the IJAE) is a quarterly peer-reviewed academic journal of anatomy and embryology. It was established in 1901 by Giulio Chiarugi and is published by Firenze University Press. It is the official journal of the Italian Society of Anatomy and Histology. All articles are submitted in English.

== Content ==
The journal publishes original papers, invited review articles, historical article, commentaries, obituaries, and book reviews. Its main focus is to understand anatomy through an analysis of structure, function, development and evolution.

Focal areas include:

- experimental studies
- molecular and cell biology
- application of modern imaging techniques
- comparative functional morphology
- developmental biology
- functional human anatomy
- methodological innovations in anatomical research
- significant advances in anatomical education
