= Philip Siekevitz =

American cell biologist (1918–2009)

- Born: February 25, 1918; Philadelphia, Pennsylvania, U.S.
- Died: December 5, 2009 (aged 91); New York City, New York, U.S.
- Education: University of California, Berkeley
- Scientific career
- Fields: Cell biology
- Workplaces: Rockefeller University
- Academic advisors: David Greenberg
- Doctoral students: David D. Sabatini

Philip Siekevitz (February 25, 1918 – December 5, 2009) was an American cell biologist who spent most of his career at Rockefeller University. He was involved in early studies of protein synthesis and trafficking, established purification techniques to facilitate study of the cell nucleus, worked with Nobel Prize in Physiology or Medicine winner George Palade on cell membrane dynamics, and published extensively on the subject of postsynaptic density.

== Early life and education ==
Siekevitz was born on February 25, 1918, in Philadelphia to a working-class immigrant family. He spent two years after high school working to save money for his college education, and then began at the Philadelphia College of Pharmacy and Science. He was drafted into the United States Army during his senior year, but deferred his service until after his graduation in 1942. He then served in the army for almost four years, first in a chemical warfare response unit and later as a laboratory technician.

Siekevitz was admitted as a graduate student to the University of California, Berkeley in 1945. He received his Ph.D. in biochemistry in 1949 under the supervision of David Greenberg, with whom he studied amino acid metabolism using radioactive tracers. After graduation, he worked as a postdoctoral fellow at Harvard University with Paul Zamecnik, who was then one of a very small number of researchers studying the biochemistry of protein synthesis. Siekevtiz's work elucidated the role of mitochondria in generating adenosine triphosphate (ATP) required for protein synthesis, which led him to become interested in general matters of energy metabolism. He received a fellowship to work with Van Potter at the University of Wisconsin studying the metabolism of adenine. This work attracted the attention of George Palade at Rockefeller University, who invited Siekevitz to work with him and colleague Keith Porter. Siekevitz moved to Rockefeller in 1954 and performed seminal work with Palade characterizing the dynamics of the endoplasmic reticulum. Siekevitz coined the popular description of mitochondria as the "powerhouse of the cell" in a Scientific American article in 1957.

== Academic career ==
Siekevitz officially joined the faculty at Rockefeller in 1959 and became a full professor in 1966. He remained there until his retirement, assuming professor emeritus status, in 1988. Throughout his independent faculty career, Siekevitz continued to collaborate closely with Palade, and the two had a number of co-supervised students and postdoctoral fellows, including David D. Sabatini and Günter Blobel. Beginning in the 1970s, Siekevitz invested significant research effort in studying the synapse and the protein composition of the postsynaptic density.

Siekevitz served as the editor of the scientific journal Journal of Cell Biology from 1961 to 1964. He served as the president of the American Society for Cell Biology in 1966 and of the New York Academy of Sciences in 1976. With Ariel G. Loewy, Siekevitz coauthored the textbook Cell Biology and Function, first published in 1963 and later republished for an additional two editions, which has been described as the first American textbook specifically on the subject of cell biology.

Siekevitz was elected to the National Academy of Sciences in 1975 and to the American Academy of Arts and Sciences in 1978.

== Personal life ==
Siekevitz married his wife Rebecca Burstein in 1949; they were married for 60 years and had two daughters. Siekevitz enjoyed playing the piano and writing fiction – he published two novellas during his lifetime and left several unpublished short stories after his death. He was noted as a vocal advocate of ethics in science and wrote often on the subject. He also published commentary and science writing pieces aimed at explaining his work to the public. Siekevitz died of a stroke on December 5, 2009.
