= Marilyn Farquhar =

American biologist (1928–2019)

- Born: July 11, 1928; Tulare, California
- Died: November 23, 2019 (aged 91); La Jolla, California
- Education: University of California, Berkeley
- Known for: tight junctions and adherens junctions
- Spouse: George Emil Palade
- Scientific career
- Fields: cell biology
- Workplaces: University of California, San Diego
- Academic advisors: George Palade

Marilyn Gist Farquhar (July 11, 1928 – November 23, 2019) was a pathologist and cellular biologist, Professor of Cellular and Molecular Medicine and Pathology, as well as the chair of the Department of Cellular and Molecular Medicine at the University of California, San Diego School of Medicine, who previously worked at Yale University from 1973 to 1990. She has won the E. B. Wilson Medal and the FASEB Excellence in Science Award. She was married to Nobel Laureate George Emil Palade from 1970 to his death in 2008. Her research focuses on control of intracellular membrane traffic and the molecular pathogenesis of auto immune kidney diseases. She has yielded a number of discoveries in basic biomedical research including: mechanisms of kidney disease, organization of functions that attach cells to one another, and mechanisms of secretions.

== Early life ==
Marilyn Gist Farquhar was born on 11 July 1928 and was raised in the Central Valley farming community of Tulare, California. Her father was from a pioneer family and worked as an insurance agent and farmer, who spent his free time writing novels. Her mother was also from a pioneer family and had begun college, but had to return home before completing her degree. Farquhar attributes her desire to pursue a career in medicine and biology to her mother's friend, Frances Zumwalt, who was a pediatrician.

== Education and career ==
Farquhar received her undergraduate degree in zoology and experimental pathology from the University of California, Berkeley. After graduation, Farquhar was admitted to the medical school at the University of California, Berkeley. In 1951, Farquhar married another medical student, with whom she had two sons. However, after two years of medical school, Farquhar shifted to a Ph.D. program where she completed her degree in experimental pathology in 1955. During her time as a graduate student, she worked in the laboratory as a junior research pathologist and then an assistant research pathologist, after completing her Ph.D., under a pathology professor who was interested in glomerular disease. Farquhar later collaborated with the University of Minnesota as a research to study renal biopsies, where they were the first to see glomerular pathology at the electron microscope level. In 1958, she left the University of California, San Francisco to do post-doctoral work as a research associate in cell biology at Rockefeller University under George Palade. At the time, many pioneers in cell biology had worked or were currently working in this lab, where there were new discoveries almost every day due to the recent innovation of the electron microscope. George Palade was working on the kidney glomerulus at the time and provided Farquhar with formal training in the field of cell biology. Together Farquhar and Palade named tight junctions and adherens junctions. Since then, Farquhar has continued to study junctions in the podocytes.

After leaving Rockefeller in 1962, she established her own laboratory at the University of California, San Francisco where she became a Professor of Pathology. Her lab focused on using tracers and cytochemistry to investigate the secretory process in pituitary cells and leukocytes. This work yielded the first description of crinophagy, the process by which secretory granules are taken up and disposed of in multivesicular bodies and lysosomes.

In 1970, she divorced her first husband and married George Palade when she decided to take a sabbatical back at Rockefeller University. At the time, she was the only woman professor when she was then appointed Professor of Cell Biology. In 1973, Farquhar returned to the University of California at San Francisco, where she remained as a professor of cell biology and pathology for the next 15 years. In 1987, she jointed Palade at Yale where she became Sterling Professor of Cell Biology and Pathology. Here she built a new Department of Cell Biology in the medical school with George Palade and James D. Jamieson. While at Yale, Farquhar's research focused on secretory granule membranes that merge with cell membranes during exocytosis. She also identified several glomerular components that play a role in glomerular functions.

In 1990, Farquhar and Palade returned home to California to help build and strengthen cell and molecular biology at the University of California, San Diego School of Medicine. Farquhar was a Professor of Cellular and Molecular Medicine and Pathology, as well as the chair of the Department of Cellular and Molecular Medicine at the University of California, San Diego School of Medicine. Her focus was on a molecule called GIV that regulates cell migration in response to growth factors and determines the fate of growth factor receptors. Throughout Farquhar's lifetime, she has witnessed and helped guide the evolution of the field of cellular biology.

== Research ==
Throughout Farquhar's career, her lab maintained two research interests – control of intracellular membrane traffic and the molecular pathogenesis of autoimmune kidney diseases. However, Farquhar's research spans numerous areas including electron microscopy, cell secretion, intracellular membrane traffic, and glomerular permeability and pathology. Farquhar's research yielded a number of discoveries in basic biomedical research, including mechanisms of kidney disease, organization of functions that attach cells to one another, and the mechanisms of secretions.

The Farquhar Lab was in the Department of Cellular and Molecular Medicine at the University of California, San Diego, and studied signaling networks that regulate secretion, endocytosis, autophagy, cell migration and cancer metastasis. Within these signaling networks, the research focus is on the interplay between G protein and growth factor signaling. Recently Farquhar discovered molecules involved in novel G-protein mediated signaling pathways. These new proteins modulate G protein signaling and link G-protein signaling to growth factor receptor trafficking. The long-term goal is to advance understanding of the role of G proteins in regulating cell processes in health and disease. The other area of interest is focused on the podocyte, or glomerular epithelial cell. The current research is focused on three projects. The first is defining trafficking and signaling mechanisms of megalin. The second project is to define the role of podocalyxin in the regulation of podocyte architecture in normal and animals with kidney disease (nephrotic syndrome). The last project is examining the interactions and pathology of nephrin, a protein found in podocytes. The long-term goal for these three projects is to define the molecular mechanisms of glomerular filtration and protein absorption under normal and pathogenic conditions.

Her research was funded by grants from the National Cancer Institute, the Susan Komen Foundation for Breast Cancer Research, and the National Institute of Diabetes, Digestive and Kidney Diseases.

== Awards ==
- 1981 - President of American Society of Cell Biology
- 1987 - E.B. Wilson Medal of the American Society of Cell Biology
- 1988 - Homer Smith Medal of the American Society of Nephrology
- 1987 - Distinguished Scientist Medal of the Electron Microscopy Society of America
- 1988 - National Institutes of Health Merit Award
- 1991 - Elected to the American Academy of Arts and Sciences
- 1997 - Chancellor's award for Excellence in Research at UCSD
- 1999 - Gomori Award from The Histochemical Society
- 2001 - Rous-Whipple Award of the American Society for Investigative Pathology
- 2006 - Federation of American Societies of Experimental Biology Award for Excellence in Science
- 2017 - Revelle Medal

== Selected publications ==
- Farquhar, M.G. (2012). "A Man for All Seasons: Reflections on the Life and Legacy of George Palade". Annu. Rev. Cell Dev. Biol. 28: 1–28. doi:10.1146/annurev-cellbio-101011-155813. PMID 22831641.
- Ghosh, P; Garcia-Marcos, M.; Farquhar, M.G. (2011). "GIV/Girdin is a rheostat that fine-tunes growth factor signals during tumor progression". Cell Adhes. Migr. 5 (3): 237–48. doi:10.4161/cam.5.3.15909. PMC 3210208.
- García-Marcos, M.; Ghosh, P.; Farquhar, M.G. (2009). "GIV is a non-receptor GEF factor for Galphai with a unique motif that regulates Akt signaling". PNAS. 106 (9): 3178–83. doi:10.1073/pnas.0900294106. PMC 2651282. PMID 19211784.
- Head, BP; Patel, HH; Roth, DM; Murray, F; Swaney, JS; Niesman, IR; Farquhar, MG; Insel, PA (2006). "Microtubules and actin microfilaments regulate lipid raft/caveolae localization of adenylyl cyclase signaling components". J Biol Chem. 281 (36): 26391–9. doi:10.1074/jbc.M602577200. PMID 16818493.
- Farquhar, M. G. (2006). "The glomerular basement membrane: not gone, just forgotten". J. Clin. Invest. 116 (8): 2090–2093. doi:10.1172/JCI29488. PMC 1523392. PMID 16886057.
- Zhang, YW; Luo, WJ; Wang, H; Lin, P; Vetrivel, KS; Liao, F; Li, F; Wong, PC; Farquhar, MG; Thinakaran, G; Xu, H (2005). "Nicastrin is critical for stability and trafficking but not association of other presenilin/g-secretase components". J. Biol. Chem. 280 (17): 17020–17026. doi:10.1074/jbc.M409467200. PMC 1201533. PMID 15711015.
- Lehtonen, S.; Ryan, J. J; Kudlicka, K.; Iino, N.; Zhou, H.; Farquhar, M. G. (2005). "Cell junction-associated proteins IQGAP1, MAGI-2, CASK, spectrins, and alpha-actinin are components of the nephrin multiprotein complex". Proc. Natl. Acad. Sci. 102 (28): 9814–19. doi:10.1073/pnas.0504166102. PMC 1175008. PMID 15994232.
- Head, B. P.; Patel, H. H.; Roth, D. M.; Niesman, I. R.; Farquhar, M. G.; Insel, P. A. (2005). "G-protein-coupled receptor signaling components localize in both sarcolemmal and intracellular caveolin-3-associated microdomains in adult cardiac myocytes". J. Biol. Chem. 280 (35): 31036–44. doi:10.1074/jbc.M502540200. PMID 15961389.
- Rader, K.; Boyer, A. D.; Farquhar, M. G.; Arden, K. C. (2000). "Assignment of ankyrin repeat, family A (RFXANK-like) 2 (ANKRA2) to human chromosome 5q12-q13 by radiation hybrid mapping and somatic cell hybrid PCR". Cytogenet. Cell Genet. 89: 164–165. doi:10.1159/000015604. PMID 10965114.
- Zheng, B.; Chen, D.; Farquhar, M.G. (2000). "MIR16, a putative membrane glycerophosphodiester phosphodiesterase, interacts with RGS16". Proc. Natl. Acad. Sci. 97 (8): 3999–4004. doi:10.1073/pnas.97.8.3999. PMC 18131. PMID 10760272.
- Farquhar, M.G. (1996). "Molecular analysis of the pathologic autoimmune antigens of Heymann nephritis". Am. J. Pathol. 148: 1331–1337. PMID 8623903.
- Kerjaschki, D.; Ullrich, R.; Exner, M.; Orlando, R.A.; Farquhar, M.G. (1996). "Induction of passive Heymann nephritis with antibodies specific for synthetic peptides". J. Exp. Med. 183: 2007–2016. doi:10.1084/jem.183.5.2007. PMC 2192573.
- Jin, M.J.; Saucan, L.; Farquhar, M.G.; Palade, G.E. (1996). "Rab1a and multiple other rab proteins are associated with the transcytotic pathway in rat liver". J. Biol. Chem. 271 (47): 30105–30113. doi:10.1074/jbc.271.47.30105. PMID 8939959.
