= T. C. Hsu =

- Born: Hsu Tao-Chiuh (徐道覺); 17 April 1917; Shaoxing, Zhejiang, China
- Died: 9 July 2003 (aged 86); Houston, Texas, USA
- Education: Zhejiang University, University of Texas at Austin (PhD 1951)
- Known for: Use of the hypotonic solution to observe each chromosome individually
- Scientific career
- Fields: Cytogenetics

T.C. Hsu (simplified Chinese: 徐道觉; traditional Chinese: 徐道覺; pinyin: Xú Dàojué; 17 April 1917 – 9 July 2003) was a Chinese American cell biologist. He was the 13th president of American Society for Cell Biology, and known as the Father of Mammalian Cytogenetics.

== Life ==
Hsu was born Hsu Tao-Chiuh in Shaoxing, Zhejiang, China. He did his undergraduate and postgraduate studies in the College of Agricultural Sciences, Zhejiang University. In 1948, he went to USA, and obtained PhD from the University of Texas at Austin in 1951. Hsu worked in the laboratory of Charles Pomerat at the University of Texas Medical Branch during the early 1950s.

Since the turn of the twentieth century, chromosomes prepared on microscope slides formed clumps that made it extremely difficult to distinguish them. Although the preparations made the identification of individual chromosomes difficult, by the 1920s, cytologists consistently reported a diploid number of 48 human chromosomes. In April 1952, Hsu discovered a technique—the hypotonic solution—that separated the clumped chromosomes, thereby allowing him to observe each one individually Even though he now could distinguish human chromosomes to a much greater degree than his predecessors, Hsu still reported a diploid number of 48 human chromosomes (see Figure 14 in his 1952 paper). The correct diploid chromosome number of 46 human chromosomes was first reported three years later by Joe Hin Tjio and Albert Levan.

Bryan Sykes describes Hsu and the diploid chromosome number in his book Adam's Curse.

Hsu was president of the American Society for Cell Biology and served on the faculty at M.D. Anderson for more than 30 years. He was a UTMB GSBS Distinguished Alumnus Award recipient in 1996. He is also a recipient of The International Center in New York's Award of Excellence.

His autobiography was published in the American Journal of Medical Genetics 59:304-325 (1995).

He died in Houston, Texas, USA.

== See also ==
- Cytogenetics
- Karyotype
