= Thomas D. Pollard =

American cell biologist

Thomas Dean Pollard
- Born: July 7, 1942 (age 84); Pasadena, California, United States
- Education: Pomona College; Harvard Medical School
- Known for: Research on cell motility, actin filaments, and myosin motors
- Awards: National Academy of Sciences (1992); E. B. Wilson Medal (2004); Gairdner Foundation International Award (2006)
- Scientific career
- Fields: cell biologist
- Workplaces: Yale University

Thomas Dean Pollard (born July 7, 1942) is a prominent educator, cell biologist and biophysicist whose research focuses on understanding cell motility through the study of actin filaments and myosin motors. He is Sterling Professor Emeritus of Molecular, Cellular & Developmental Biology and a professor emeritus of cell biology and molecular biophysics & biochemistry at Yale University. He was dean of Yale's Graduate School of Arts and Sciences from 2010 to 2014, and president of the Salk Institute for Biological Studies from 1996 to 2001.

== Education ==
He was educated at Pomona College, receiving a B.A. degree in 1964.

He then attended Harvard Medical School, graduating cum laude in 1968. He then interned in internal medicine at Massachusetts General Hospital.

== Career ==
Following his internship, Pollard became a Staff Associate at the National Heart and Lung Institute. Soon after, he returned to Harvard, becoming an assistant professor of anatomy in 1972, and advancing to associate professor in 1975. In 1977, Pollard was named professor and director of the department of cell biology and anatomy at Johns Hopkins University School of Medicine, where his laboratory discovered and characterized several important cellular proteins. In 1996, he left Hopkins to become the president of the Salk Institute for Biological Studies in La Jolla, California, where he also maintained a highly productive research unit in the structural biology laboratory. Additionally, Pollard served as an adjunct professor of biology, of bioengineering, and of chemistry and biochemistry at the University of California, San Diego. In 2001, Pollard moved his laboratory to Yale, where he was appointed Sterling Professor of Molecular, Cellular & Developmental Biology and professor of Cell Biology and of Molecular Biophysics & Biochemistry. From 2003 to 2010 he chaired the Department of Molecular, Cellular & Developmental Biology. In 2010, President Richard Levin named Pollard dean of the graduate school of arts and sciences at Yale, where he served until 2014. After retiring from Yale in 2021, Pollard was appointed Visiting Professor, Department of Molecular and Cell Biology, University of California, Berkeley. From 2018 to 2021, Pollard was director of Yale's Institute for Biological, Physical and Engineering Sciences. Pollard has been very active in promoting scientific education and federal funding of biomedical research primarily through two major societies, both of which he served as a past president: the American Society for Cell Biology and the Biophysical Society.

Нe is an Editor of the journal Molecular Biology of the Cell published by the American Society for Cell Biology.

Pollard is a Fellow of the:

- American Academy of Arts and Sciences (1990)
- National Academy of Sciences of the United States (1992)
- American Association for the Advancement of Science (1993)
- American Academy of Microbiology (1997)
- Biophysical Society (1999)
- Institute of Medicine (1999)
- American Society for Cell Biology (2016)

Pollard is a recipient of the:

- Rosenstiel Award, Brandeis University (jointly with James Spudich in 1996)
- Public Service Award, Biophysical Society (1997)
- E.B. Wilson Medal, American Society for Cell Biology (2004)
- Gairdner International Award in Biomedical Sciences (2006).
- NAS Award for Scientific Reviewing (2015)
- Connecticut Medal of Science (2025)

Along with co-authors William C. Earnshaw, PhD, FRSE; Jennifer Lippincott-Schwartz, PhD; and illustrator Graham Johnson, Pollard is the primary author of the textbook Cell Biology now in its fourth edition published by Elsevier (2023). Numerous publications, teaching and public service awards, scientists mentored, and editorial boards served-on exemplify Pollard's extensive contributions to the fields of education and cell biology.

== Family ==
Thomas Pollard is married to Patricia Snowden, past president of the Maryland League of Women's Voters and cofounder of the Maryland Education Coalition. They have two children. Katherine Snowden Pollard is director of the Gladstone Institute of Data Science and Biotechnology, a Professor at the University of California, San Francisco, and investigator at the Chan Zuckerberg Biohub. Daniel Avery Pollard is an associate professor in the biology department of Western Washington University.
