= Ruth Lehmann =

German-American developmental and cell biologist

Ruth Lehmann ForMemRS
- Born: 1955 (age 70–71); Cologne, West Germany
- Education: University of Tübingen
- Partner: Steven Burden
- Awards: National Academy of Sciences, 2005; Conklin Medal, 2011; Vilcek Prize in Biomedical Science, 2021; Thomas Hunt Morgan Medal, 2021; Gruber Prize in Genetics, 2022; Fellow of the Royal Society, 2024
- Scientific career
- Fields: Developmental and cell biology
- Workplaces: New York University School of Medicine
- Thesis: Regionsspezifische Segmentierungsmutanten bei Drosophila melanogaster Meigen (1985)
- Doctoral advisor: Christiane Nüsslein-Volhard
- Website: www.lehmannlab.com

Ruth Lehmann (born 1955) is a developmental and cell biologist. She is the Director of the Whitehead Institute for Biomedical Research. She previously was affiliated with the New York University School of Medicine, where she was the Director of the Skirball Institute of Biomolecular Medicine, the Laura and Isaac Perlmutter Professor of Cell Biology, and the Chair of the Department of Cell Biology. Her research focuses on germ cells and embryogenesis.

== Early life ==
Lehmann initially became interested in science during her early years at home. Her mother served as a teacher and loved both the arts and literature, while her father worked as an engineer. She developed a particular interest in biology, which was in part fueled by a high school biology teacher who encouraged her to pursue the subject at a university.

== Education ==
Lehmann attended the University of Tübingen in Germany to pursue a major in biology. Despite her love for the subject, she was unhappy with the teaching environment and found the courses tedious. Following strong encouragement from American faculty, she applied for and was granted a Fulbright Fellowship in 1977 to study ecology in the United States. After realizing that she preferred genetics and mathematics to ecology, she connected with Gerold Schubiger, a geneticist studying fruit fly development in Seattle, Washington where she learned classical developmental biology. Following her year-long fellowship, Lehmann attended her first scientific conference, the 1978 Society for Developmental Biology meeting in Madison, Wisconsin. There she met her future mentor and friend Christiane Nüsslein-Volhard. As Nüsslein-Volhard was moving to an independent position at the European Molecular Biology Laboratory in Heidelberg, which was not associated with a graduate program, she referred Lehmann to José Campos-Ortega, a researcher at Freiburg University studying the neurobiology of Drosophila . Lehmann worked closely with both Campos-Ortega and Nüsslein-Volhard and returned to Tübingen the following year to earn her Ph.D. with Nüsslein-Volhard, at the Max Planck Institute for Developmental Biology, studying the maternal genes affecting embryonic development in fruit flies. Lehmann then accepted a post-doctoral position at the MRC Laboratory of Molecular Biology in Cambridge, England.

== Academic career ==
Following her post-doctoral position at the MRC Laboratory of Molecular Biology, Lehmann returned to the United States to found her own laboratory at the Massachusetts Institute of Technology. She remained at MIT for 8 years, serving as a faculty member at both MIT and the Whitehead Institute for Biomedical Research, in addition to working as a geneticist and molecular biologist at the Massachusetts General Hospital. In 1994, Lehmann was one of 16 women faculty in the School of Science at MIT who drafted and co-signed a letter to the then-Dean of Science (later Chancellor of Berkeley) Robert Birgeneau, which started a campaign to highlight and challenge gender discrimination at MIT.

Lehmann then moved to the Skirball Institute of Biomolecular Medicine at New York University in 1996 as the Laura and Isaac Perlmutter Professor of Cell Biology. She has since become the director of the Skirball Institute and the Helen L. and Martin S. Kimmel Center for Stem Cell Biology, and has recently been named chair of the Cell Biology Department.

Lehmann has served as president of the Society of Developmental Biology, president of the Harvey Society, and council member of the American Society for Cell Biology. In addition, she has founded and advised graduate programs for NYU Medical Center, Harvard Medical School, University of California San Francisco, and more. She is on the council for the National Institute of Child Health and serves as editor for a number of scientific journals including Cell, Developmental Biology and the Annual Review of Cell and Developmental Biology.

As of September 2019, Lehmann was announced as the new Director of the Whitehead Institute for Biomedical Research, succeeding David Page.

== Awards, honors, and tributes ==
Lehman has been a member of the National Academy of Sciences since 2005, one of the most prestigious honorary organizations for scientists in the nation. In 2011 she was awarded the Conklin Medal of the Society of Developmental Biology. In 2012 she was named an Associate for the European Molecular Biology Organization. In 2017 she received the Inaugural Klaus Sander Prize from German Society for Developmental Biology. The American Society for Cell Biology awarded her the Keith R. Porter Award in 2018. In 2020, was named a Howard Hughes Medical Institute Investigator. She was elected to the American Academy of Arts and Sciences in 1998 and received the Academy's Francis Amory Prize in Reproductive Medicine and Reproductive Physiology in 2020. She is the recipient of the 2021 Vilcek Prize in Biomedical Science, awarded by the Vilcek Foundation. In 2021 she received an honorary doctorate from the University of Basel. In 2021, she was awarded the Thomas Hunt Morgan Medal. In 2021, Lehman was named by Carnegie Corporation of New York as an honoree of the Great Immigrants Award. In 2022 she received the Vanderbilt Prize in Biomedical Science and the Gruber Prize in Genetics. In 2024, Lehmann was elected as a Fellow of the Royal Society.

== Research ==
Lehmann published her first paper in 1981 under her Fulbright Fellowship mentor Campos-Ortega, detailing her study of early neurogenesis in Drosophila and the effects of lethal mutations on neural and epidermal cell precursors. Under Nüsslein-Volhard, Lehmann began to study maternal genes like oskar, pumilio, and nanos, comparing the effects of maternal versus zygotic genes in germ cell formation, abdominal patterning, and cell signaling. Using molecular cloning techniques, she discovered that oskar and nanos RNA transcripts regulate gene expression and germ cell formation by localizing at the posterior embryonic pole. Her later work continues to build on this discovery by analyzing modification mechanisms of RNA transcript production and how they affect germ cell differentiation and localization in Drosophila. Among other mechanisms, her laboratory discovered that a polyadenylated tail is not required for gene regulation.

Lehmann continued to focus her research efforts on germ cell differentiation well into the early 2000s. She played a substantial role in the discovery of germ cell migratory pathways (namely those involving gap junctions, G protein-coupled receptors like Tre-1, and isoprenoids), particularly those concerning migration into the ovaries and testis. In 2005, Lehmann's laboratory published a paper relating the lipid phosphatases Wunen and Wunen 2 to germ cell migration and elimination, suggesting that germ cells are sorted into the gonads by a type of repellent mechanism. Her findings up to this point indicated that germ cells avoid differentiation into somatic cells through a combination of her previously studied regulatory mechanisms, each of which has the potential to silence transcription and control translation.

Currently, Lehmann is studying piRNA production and the role it plays in preventing transposable element insertion and movement across the Drosophila genome. She discovered that biogenesis of piRNAs and activation of the piRNA pathway is directly dependent on a number of proteins and epigenetic interactions. These results indicate that piRNAs play a paramount role in maintaining genomic integrity while allowing for genetic variation to occur.
