= Robert D. Goldman =

American cell and molecular biologist

- Born: July 23, 1939
- Citizenship: United States of America
- Education: University of Vermont, M.S., Princeton University, Ph.D. 1967
- Known for: intermediate filaments
- Spouse: Anne Goldman
- Awards: President of the American Society for Cell Biology, 2008; Ellison Senior Scholar Award in Aging, 2004
- Scientific career
- Fields: cell biology, molecular biology
- Workplaces: Feinberg School of Medicine, Northwestern University; Marine Biological Laboratory; Royal Postgraduate Medical School; MRC Institute of Virology; Carnegie-Mellon University
- Thesis: The structure and some properties of the isolated mitotic apparatus. (1967)
- Doctoral advisor: Lionel Israel Rebhun
- Website: labs.feinberg.northwestern.edu/goldman/

Robert D. Goldman is an American cell and molecular biologist. He was the Chair of the Department of Cell and Molecular Biology at Northwestern University Feinberg School of Medicine. He held the Stephen Walter Ranson Professor of Cell Biology at the institution. He is currently a professor of Cell and Developmental Biology at Feinberg.

== Education ==
Goldman majored in zoology at the University of Vermont, where he pursued an interest in how organisms interact with their environment. He subsequently received his master's degree in Freshwater Biology from the University of Vermont and graduated in 1963. The title of his master thesis was "An investigation of growth-inhibiting substances produced by Kirchnerielle subsolitaria, a green alga."

Goldman pursued doctoral studies at Princeton University, where he researched with Lionel I. Rebhun on understanding the sea urchin mitotic apparatus. Much work was conducted at the Marine Biological Laboratory in Woods Hole, Massachusetts. Goldman received his PhD in biology from Princeton University in 1967.

== Career ==
Upon earning his Ph.D. in 1967, Goldman pursued post-doctoral research in enzyme cytochemistry, cell biology, and cell culture at the Royal Postgraduate Medical School in London and the MRC Institute of Virology in Glasgow. From 1969 through 1973, he was an assistant professor of biology at Case Western Reserve University. From 1973 to 1981, we were an associate professor and professor of biological sciences at Carnegie-Mellon University. In 1981, he was named The Stephen Walter Ranson Professor at the Feinberg School of Medicine at Northwestern University and Chair of the Anatomy Department. The department was subsequently renamed the Cell Biology and Anatomy Department, the Cell Biology and Molecular Biology Department, the Cell, Molecular, and Structural Biology Department, and the Cell and Molecular Biology Department. In 2019, he stepped down as chair and remains a professor in the renamed Department of Cell and Developmental Biology.

For over three decades, Professor Goldman has researched intermediate filaments in the cytoskeleton and the nucleoskeleton. He concentrates on molecular mechanisms that organize these intermediate filaments, including their assembly and disassembly. He is currently pursuing research on vimentin and lamins.

== Publications ==
Goldman has published more than 400 publications on intermediate filaments.

He is the author of Live Cell Imaging: A Laboratory Manual.

== Awards and honors ==
MERIT Award, National Institute for General Medical Sciences, 1999-2009

Fellow of the American Association for the Advancement of Science, 1988

Ellison Senior Scholar Award in Aging, 2004

Elected president of the American Society for Cell Biology in 2008.

Elected foreign member of the Finnish Society of Sciences and Letters in 2014

NIH Director Francis Collins made a video tribute to Goldman for a symposium celebrating his scientific career.
