= Pietro De Camilli =

American biologist

- Born: Brenta, Lombardy
- Education: University of Milan; University of Pavia
- Awards: Julius Axelrod Prize (2015); Ernst Jung Gold Medal for Medicine (2019); E.B. Wilson Medal (2021)
- Scientific career
- Fields: Neuroscience; Cell biology
- Workplaces: Yale University
- Academic advisors: Paul Greengard

Pietro De Camilli NAS, AAA&S, NAM is an Italian-American biologist and John Klingenstein Professor of Neuroscience and Cell Biology at Yale University School of Medicine. He is also an Investigator at Howard Hughes Medical Institute. De Camilli completed his M.D. degree from the University of Milan in Italy in 1972. He then went to the United States and did his postdoctoral studies at Yale University with Paul Greengard.

De Camilli is known for contributions that has been to demonstrate the crucial role of protein-lipid interactions and phosphoinositide metabolism in the control of membrane traffic at the synapse.

He has received several awards and honors for his work. He was elected to the European Molecular Biology Organization in 1987. In 2001, he was elected to the National Academy of Sciences and to the American Academy of Arts and Sciences. In 1990 he received the Max-Planck-Forschungspreis together with Reinhard Jahn (at this time at the Max Planck Institute of Psychiatry). In 2019 he was awarded the Ernst Jung Gold Medal for Medicine for lifetime achievement.
