= J. Herbert Taylor =

James Herbert Taylor (January 14, 1916 in Corsicana, Texas – December 29, 1998 in Tallahassee, Florida) was an American molecular biologist and geneticist known for his research on chromosome structure and reproduction, which helped establish standards for the subsequent field of molecular genetics. He conducted much of this research with his wife, Shirley Taylor. According to a 2006 Cold Spring Harbor Laboratory textbook, “Taylor comes as close as anyone to being the father of the field” of studying chromosomes.

== Education ==
Taylor received his B.S. from Southeastern Oklahoma State University in 1939, his M.S. in botany and bacteriology from the University of Oklahoma in 1941, and his Ph.D. in biology from the University of Virginia in 1944.

== Career ==
Taylor served as a sergeant in the Army Medical Corps during World War II. In 1951, he joined Columbia University as an assistant professor of botany. In 1954, he left Columbia to join Florida State University (FSU) as an associate professor of botany, and became a full professor of cell biology there in 1958. In 1960, he co-founded the American Society for Cell Biology. In 1964, FSU appointed him Professor of Biological Science in the university's Institute for Molecular Biophysics; he served as the institute's director from 1980 to 1985. In 1983, he was appointed the Robert O. Lawton Distinguished Professor of Biological Science at FSU.

== Honors and awards ==
Taylor received a Guggenheim Fellowship in genetics in 1958, and was elected president of the American Society for Cell Biology in 1969. He was elected to the National Academy of Sciences in 1977.
