= Hewson Swift =

American cell biologist (1920–2004)

- Born: November 8, 1920
- Died: January 1, 2004 (aged 83)
- Known for: Quantitative studies of nuclear DNA content
- Scientific career
- Fields: Cell biology, developmental biology
- Institutions: University of Chicago

Hewson Hoyt Swift (November 8, 1920 – January 1, 2004) was a cell biologist at the University of Chicago whose research included quantitative studies of DNA content in plant and animal cell nuclei. In a 1950 study of plant nuclei, he reported that nuclear DNA occurred in discrete amounts characteristic of species and strains, doubled before mitosis, and was reduced during meiosis. Swift was elected to the National Academy of Sciences in 1971.

== Early life and education ==
Swift was born November 8, 1920, in Auburn, New York. He grew up in New York City. He earned a B.A. in zoology at Swarthmore College in 1942, an M.A. at the University of Iowa in 1945, and a Ph.D. in zoology at Columbia University in 1947.

== Career ==
An early position of his was as an entomologist for the USDA, and he later served as curator of spiders at the U.S. National Museum. Swift joined the University of Chicago faculty in 1949, with his affiliation listed in 1950 as the Department of Zoology. He became a professor in 1958, and he subsequently was chair of biology from 1972 to 1977. In 1977, Swift became the George Wells Beadle Distinguished Service Professor in Molecular Genetics & Cell Biology and Pathology; he was also affiliated with the Committee on Genetics and Committee on Developmental Biology.

== Research ==
Swift's obituary described his expertise in electron microscopy, chromosome structure and function, and DNA-based studies of evolutionary relationships; he was credited with pioneering quantitative microscopy. The obituary says he was the first to measure DNA amounts in different cell types and in mitochondria and chloroplasts. The initial measurements of DNA contents of cells were published in two studies of nuclear DNA content in 1950: “The desoxyribose nucleic acid content of animal nuclei,” in Physiological Zoology and “The constancy of desoxyribose nucleic acid in plant nuclei,” in Proceedings of the National Academy of Sciences.

Swift estimated DNA content by making photometric measurements of individual stained nuclei through a microscope. He found that nuclear DNA occurred in clearly separated quantitative classes. The nuclei contained amounts corresponding to 2, 4, 8, 16, or 32 times the haploid value. DNA content increased to twice the diploid amount before mitosis. The DNA content of the cells was reduced during meiosis, leaving the microgamete with half the diploid amount.

Swift measured DNA across different species and found that they had characteristic amounts of nuclear DNA. Swift also detected a difference of approximately 10 percent between two corn strains that differed in their amounts of heterochromatin and presence of B chromosomes. He interpreted the species- and strain-specific quantities as evidence that nuclear DNA content was directly associated with genotype. In the paper’s discussion, Swift argued that the quantitative behavior was consistent with DNA being a component of the gene. His measurements supported DNA constancy and the existence of organelle genomes.

With A. B. Jacobson and Lawrence Bogorad, Swift demonstrated that plastids in etiolated and green maize leaves contained RNA in particles resembling ribosomes.

== Professional service ==
Swift co-founded the American Society for Cell Biology with Keith R. Porter and others in 1960. He helped organize its first meeting and served as ASCB president from 1963 to 1964.

== Honors ==
- Elected to the National Academy of Sciences in 1971.
- Elected member of the American Academy of Arts and Sciences (1967).
- E. B. Wilson Medal (1985).
