= George Emil Palade =

Romanian cell biologist, physicist and Nobel laureate

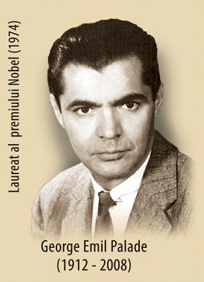
- Palade on a 2021 Romanian stamp
- Born: George Emil Palade; November 19, 1912; Iași, Kingdom of Romania
- Died: October 8, 2008 (aged 95); Del Mar, California, United States
- Education: Carol Davila School of Medicine
- Known for: Ribosomes; Rough ER
- Spouses: Irina Malaxa (m. 1941; died 1969); Marilyn Farquhar (m. 1970)
- Awards: Albert Lasker Award for Basic Medical Research (1966); Gairdner Foundation International Award (1967); Louisa Gross Horwitz Prize (1970); Nobel Prize in Physiology or Medicine (1974); E. B. Wilson Medal (1981); National Medal of Science (1986)
- Scientific career
- Fields: Cell biology
- Workplaces: New York University; Rockefeller University; Yale University; University of California, San Diego
- Notable students: Günter Blobel

George Emil Palade ForMemRS HonFRMS (Romanian pronunciation: [ˈdʒe̯ordʒe eˈmil paˈlade]; November 19, 1912 – October 7, 2008) was a Romanian-American cell biologist. In 1974 he was awarded the Nobel Prize in Physiology or Medicine along with Albert Claude and Christian de Duve. The prize was granted for his innovations in electron microscopy and cell fractionation which together laid the foundations of modern molecular cell biology, the most notable discovery being the ribosomes of the endoplasmic reticulum – which he first described in 1955.

Palade also received the U.S. National Medal of Science in Biological Sciences for "pioneering discoveries of a host of fundamental, highly organized structures in living cells" in 1986, and was previously elected a Member of the U.S. National Academy of Sciences in 1961. In 1968 he was elected as an Honorary Fellow of the Royal Microscopical Society (HonFRMS) and in 1984 he became a Foreign Member of the Royal Society (ForMemRS).

== Education and early life ==
George Emil Palade was born on November 19, 1912, in Iași, Romania. His paternal family, the Palade, was a boyar family of Greek descent, probably originally from Thessaloniki, with Palade's father being a professor of philosophy at the University of Iași. His mother, Constanța Cantemir, was a high school teacher, descended on her father's side from the Cantemir family and on her mother's side from the family of Dimitrie Iosepide, which was likewise of Greek descent.

Religiously, Palade adhered to Greek Orthodox Christianity. He received his M.D. in 1940 from the Carol Davila School of Medicine in Bucharest.

== Career and research ==
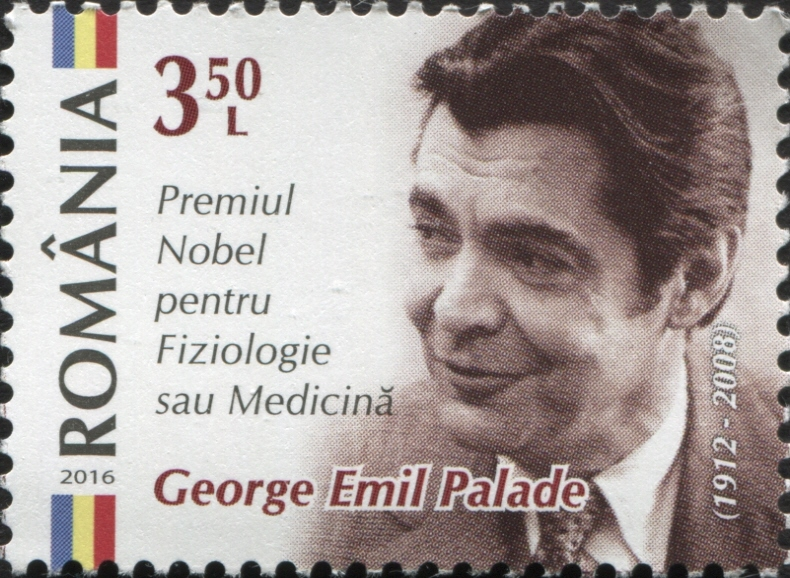
Palade on a 2016 Romanian stamp

Palade was a member of the faculty at University of Bucharest until 1946, when he went to the United States to do postdoctoral research. While assisting Robert Chambers in the Biology Laboratory of New York University, he met Professor Albert Claude. He later joined Claude at the Rockefeller Institute for Medical Research.

In 1952, Palade became a naturalized citizen of the United States. He worked at the Rockefeller Institute (1958–1973), and was a professor at Yale University Medical School (1973–1990), and University of California, San Diego (1990–2008). At UCSD, Palade was Professor of Medicine in Residence (Emeritus) in the Department of Cellular & Molecular Medicine, as well as a Dean for Scientific Affairs (Emeritus), in the School of Medicine at La Jolla, California.

In 1970, he was awarded the Louisa Gross Horwitz Prize from Columbia University, together with Renato Dulbecco (winner of the 1975 Nobel Prize in Physiology or Medicine) "for discoveries concerning the functional organization of the cell that were seminal events in the development of modern cell biology", related to his previous research carried out at the Rockefeller Institute for Medical Research. His Nobel lecture, delivered on December 12, 1974, was entitled: "Intracellular Aspects of the Process of Protein Secretion", published in 1992 by the Nobel Prize Foundation, He was elected an Honorary member of the Romanian Academy in 1975. He received the Golden Plate Award of the American Academy of Achievement in 1975. In 1981, Palade became a founding member of the World Cultural Council. In 1985, he became the founding editor of the Annual Review of Cell and Developmental Biology. In 1988 he was also elected an Honorary Member of the American-Romanian Academy of Arts and Sciences (ARA).

Palade was the first Chairman of the Department of Cell Biology at Yale University. Presently, the Chair of Cell Biology at Yale is named the "George Palade Professorship".

Palade was known for his support and mentorship with young scientists and that colleagues of his saw him regularly engaged with graduate students at conferences and encouraged innovative experimental approaches that would be normally been seen as un-regular. Including the use of electron microscopy in the secretory pathway research.

At the Rockefeller Institute for Medical Research, Palade used electron microscopy to study the internal organization of such cell structures as ribosomes, mitochondria, chloroplasts, the Golgi apparatus, and others. His most important discovery was made while using an experimental strategy known as a pulse-chase analysis. In the experiment Palade and his colleagues were able to confirm an existing hypothesis that a secretory pathway exists and that the Rough ER and the Golgi apparatus function together.

He focused on Weibel-Palade bodies (a storage organelle unique to the endothelium, containing von Willebrand factor and various proteins) which he described together with the Swiss anatomist Ewald R. Weibel.

He was a member of the American Association for Anatomy.

=== Palade's coworkers and approach in the 1960s ===
The following is a concise excerpt from Palade's Autobiography appearing in the Nobel Award documents

In the 1960s, I continued the work on the secretory process using in parallel or in succession two different approaches. The first relied exclusively on cell fractionation, and was developed in collaboration with Philip Siekevitz, Lewis Joel Greene, Colvin Redman, David Sabatini, and Yutaka Tashiro; it led to the characterization of the zymogen granules and to the discovery of the segregation of secretory products in the cisternal space of the endoplasmic reticulum. The second approach relied primarily on radioautography, and involved experiments on intact animals or pancreatic slices which were carried out in collaboration with Lucien Caro and especially James Jamieson. This series of investigations produced a good part of our current ideas on the synthesis and intracellular processing of proteins for export. A critical review of this line of research is presented in the Nobel Lecture.

One notes also that the Nobel Prize in Chemistry was awarded in 2009 to Venkatraman Ramakrishnan, Thomas A. Steitz, and Ada E. Yonath "for studies of the structure and function of the ribosome", discovered by George Emil Palade.

== Personal life ==
He married Irina Malaxa (born in 1919, the daughter of industrialist Nicolae Malaxa) on June 12, 1941. The couple had two children: Georgia (born in 1943) and Theodore (born in 1949). After his wife died in 1969, Palade married Marilyn Farquhar, a cell biologist at the University of California, San Diego.

== Bibliography ==
- Singer, Manfred V (2003). "Legacy of a distinguished scientist: George E. Palade". Pancreatology. 3 (6): 518–9. doi:10.1159/000076328. ISSN 1424-3903. PMID 14730177. S2CID 36839347.
- Haulică, I (2002). "[Professor doctor George Emil Palade at 90 years of age]". Revista medico-chirurgicală a Societății de Medici și Naturaliști din Iași. 107 (2): 223–5. ISSN 0300-8738. PMID 12638263.
- Tartakoff, Alan M (November 2002). "George Emil Palade: charismatic virtuoso of cell biology". Nature Reviews Molecular Cell Biology. 3 (11): 871–6. doi:10.1038/nrm953. ISSN 1471-0072. PMID 12415304. S2CID 2844447.
- Motta, P M (2001). "George Emil Palade and Don Wayne Fawcett and the development of modern anatomy, histology and contemporary cell biology". Italian Journal of Anatomy and Embryology. 106 (2 Suppl 1): XXI–XXXVIII. ISSN 1122-6714. PMID 11730003.
- Farquhar, M G; Wissig S. L.; Palade G. E. (December 1999). "Glomerular permeability I. Ferritin transfer across the normal glomerular capillary wall. 1961". Journal of the American Society of Nephrology. 10 (12): 2645–62. ISSN 1046-6673. PMID 10589706.
- Raju, T N (October 1999). "The Nobel chronicles. 1974: Albert Claude (1899–1983), George Emil Palade (b 1912), and Christian Réne de Duve (b 1917)". The Lancet. 354 (9185): 1219. doi:10.1016/S0140-6736(05)75433-7. ISSN 0140-6736. PMID 10513750. S2CID 54323049.
- Sabatini, D D (October 1999). "George E. Palade: charting the secretory pathway". Trends in Cell Biology. 9 (10): 413–7. doi:10.1016/S0962-8924(99)01633-5. ISSN 0962-8924. PMID 10481180.
- Motta, P M (1998). "George Emil Palade and Don Wayne Fawcett and the development of modern anatomy, histology and contemporary cell biology". Italian Journal of Anatomy and Embryology. 103 (2): 65–81. ISSN 1122-6714. PMID 9719773.
- Porter, K R (July 1983). "An informal tribute to George E. Palade". The Journal of Cell Biology. 97 (1): D3–7. ISSN 0021-9525. PMID 6345553.
- Tashiro, Y (January 1975). "[Accomplishment of Drs. Albert Calude and George E. Palade and the birth of cell biology]". Tanpakushitsu Kakusan Koso. 20 (1): 74–6. ISSN 0039-9450. PMID 1094498.
- Magner, J W; Ritchie E H; Cahill S C (January 1975). "Current medical literature". Journal of the Indian Medical Association. 64 (1): 20–2. ISSN 0019-5847. PMID 1094070.
- "George E. Palade". Triangle. 9 (6): 229–30. 1970. ISSN 0041-2597. PMID 4927031.
