= Keith R. Porter =

Canadian-American cell biologist (1912–1997)

Keith Roberts Porter
- Born: June 11, 1912; Yarmouth, Nova Scotia, Canada
- Died: May 2, 1997 (aged 84); Bryn Mawr, Pennsylvania, U.S.
- Occupation: Cell biologist

Keith Roberts Porter (June 11, 1912 – May 2, 1997) was a Canadian-American cell biologist. He created pioneering biology techniques and research using electron microscopy of cells. Porter also contributed to developing other experimental cell culture and nuclear transplantation methods. He was also responsible for naming the endoplasmic reticulum, working on the 9 + 2 microtubule structure in the axoneme of cilia, and coining the term "microtrabecular lattice." Collaborating with other scientists, he contributed to understanding cellular structures and concepts such as compartmentalization, flagella, centrioles, fibrin, collagen, T-tubules and sarcoplasmic reticulum. He also introduced microtome cutting.

== Early life and education ==
Keith Porter was born in Yarmouth, Nova Scotia, on June 11, 1912, the son of Aaron and Josephine Roberts Porter. He finished his undergraduate program at Acadia University in 1934 and became a graduate student at Harvard University. At Harvard, he earned a doctorate (Ph.D.) for his work on frog embryo development in 1938. Following this degree, he married Katherine Elizabeth Lingley, a former student at Acadia University. They had one son, Gregory, who died just over one year later. Starting in the early 1940s, he conducted research at The Rockefeller Institute for Medical Research in New York. He eventually became a citizen of the United States in 1947.

== Career/research ==
In 1939, Porter was a research assistant at The Rockefeller Institute for Medical Research under James B. Murphy, a cancer researcher. Porter focused his early work in Murphy's lab on the effect of carcinogens on the embryonic development of rats. Because it was difficult for them to fix these cells properly to the slide, Porter concluded that osmium tetroxide preserved the cells the best. When Porter made a photomicrograph of the first cell, he noticed that only the thin sections could be seen. The nuclei region was a dark blob due to all the internal structures surrounding the nucleus. He needed a higher penetration power to see the thicker portions of the cell. Only small sections of thinly sliced cells could be micro-graphed, so Porter focused on how whole cells could be photographed. In conjunction with Joseph Blum, he designed an ultramicrotome section of specific tissue thickness to allow the electron microscope to penetrate these cells. By 1956, he became a professor and full member at the Rockefeller University.

From 1961 to 1967, Porter returned to Harvard University and was chair of the biology department (1965–1967). Porter's research at Harvard concerned the sarcoplasmic reticulum and T system; he conducted this work in collaboration with Clara Franzini-Amstrong. He then explored the role of microtubules in motility, cell division, and control of cell shape with Lewis Tilney, J. Richard McIntosh and Ursula Goodenough-Johnson.

In 1968, Porter left to work as chair of the new Department of Molecular, Cellular, and Developmental Biology at the University of Colorado Boulder. Porter spearheaded a laboratory dedicated to a higher-voltage (1000 kV) electron microscope, that improved the ability to examine the interior of cells by virtue of its high penetrating power. When he retired, at age 70, the university awarded him an honorary degree and renamed "his" building Porter Biosciences.

Porter became a professor at the University of Maryland, Baltimore County (UMBC) in 1984 before joining Lee D. Peachey’s laboratory at the University of Pennsylvania in 1988, post-retirement. UMBC's Keith R. Porter Core Imaging Facility is dedicated to Porter.

Porter helped found the American Society for Cell Biology and the Journal of Cell Biology. The Keith R. Porter Endowment for Cell Biology, founded in 1981, supports an annual Keith R. Porter Lecture at the American Society for Cell Biology conference.

== Recognition ==
In 1970, Porter, with Albert Claude and George E. Palade, was awarded the Louisa Gross Horwitz Prize from Columbia University. In 1974, Porter's colleagues Albert Claude, Christian de Duve and George E. Palade were awarded a Nobel Prize "for describing the structure and function of organelles in biological cells," work that Porter is also well known for. Although Porter is known by many as "The Father of Cell Biology," he never officially won a Nobel Prize for his achievements and contributions to science.

== Awards and honors ==
- 1957 elected to the American Academy of Arts and Sciences
- 1962 elected president of the Electron Microscope Society of America.
- 1964 Gairdner Foundation International Award
- 1964 elected to the United States National Academy of Sciences
- 1970 Louisa Gross Horwitz Prize of Columbia University
- 1971 Dickson Prize in Science
- 1971 Paul Ehrlich and Ludwig Darmstaedter Prize
- 1976 National Medal of Science
- 1977 elected to the American Philosophical Society
- 1981 E. B. Wilson Medal
- 1990 elected president of the Electron Microscope Society of America for a second time.
