= Searle Scholars Program =

The Searle Scholars Program is a career development award made annually to support 15 young faculty in biomedical research and chemistry at US universities and research centers. The goal of the award is to support to exceptional young scientists who are at the beginning of their independent research careers and are working in the fields of medicine, chemistry, and/or biological sciences.

== History ==
The award was established in 1980 by a donation from trusts established by John G. Searle and Frances C. Searle. John G. Searle had served as President of G. D. Searle & Company, a pharmaceutical company known for developing the first female birth control pill. The program is funded through the Chicago Community Trust and administered by the Kinship Foundation.

== Process ==
Applicants must be pursuing independent research careers in biochemistry, cell biology, genetics, immunology, neuroscience, pharmacology, and related areas in chemistry, medicine, and the biological sciences, and must be in their first or second year of their first tenure-track assistant professor position. Applicants at 176 universities are eligible to be nominated. Grantees receive grants worth $300,000, paid out over the course of 3 years.

== Recipients ==
As of 2022, 622 Searle Scholars had been selected. Since 1981:

- 85 recipients have been inducted into the US National Academy of Sciences.
- 20 recipients have received a MacArthur Fellowship.
- 2 recipients have won the Nobel Prize.

=== 1981 ===
- Dale L. Boger, University of Kansas
- Walter F. Boron, Yale University
- G. Charles Dismukes, Princeton University
- Elaine V. Fuchs, The University of Chicago
- Stanley M. Goldin, Harvard University and Harvard School of Public Health
- Leroy F. Liu, The Johns Hopkins University
- James E. Niedel, Duke University
- Harry T. Orr, Professor of Pathology University of Minnesota
- Daniel K. Podolsky, Harvard University and Harvard School of Public Health
- Lee L. Rubin, The Rockefeller University
- Wesley J. Thompson, The University of Texas at Austin
- Chun-Fang Wu, University of Iowa

=== 1982 ===
- David A. Agard, University of California, San Francisco
- George Barany, University of Minnesota
- Albert H. Beth, Vanderbilt University
- Kurt Drickamer, The University of Chicago
- Alan L. Epstein, Northwestern University
- Larry R. Gerace, The Johns Hopkins University
- Stephen P. Goff, Higgins Professor of Biochemistry & Molecular Biophysics, Columbia University
- Ralph J. Greenspan, Princeton University
- Mark E. Gurney, The University of Chicago
- Russel E. Kaufman, Duke University
- Daniel F. Klessig, University of Utah
- Burks Oakley II, University of Illinois at Urbana Champaign
- Peter Parham, Stanford University
- Jordan S. Pober, Harvard University and Harvard School of Public Health
- Stuart L. Schreiber, Yale University
- Suresh Subramani, University of California, San Diego

=== 1983 ===
- Frederick Alt, Columbia University
- Gary W. Brudvig, Yale University
- Peter M. J. Burgers, Washington University
- Michele P. Calos, Stanford University
- Robert B. Clark, University of Connecticut
- Daniel J. Donoghue, University of California, San Diego
- Richard W. Gross, Washington University
- Alfred J. Lewy, Oregon Health & Science University
- Douglas A. Melton, Harvard University and Harvard School of Public Health
- Hylan C. Moises, University of Michigan Medical School
- Richard C. Mulligan, Massachusetts Institute of Technology
- Daniel F. Schafer, University of Nebraska
- Paul C. Sternweis, University of Texas Southwestern Medical Center
- Kevin Struhl, Harvard University and Harvard School of Public Health
- Roger Y. Tsien, University of California, Berkeley
- Margaret R. Wallace, University of Florida
- Peter Walter, University of California, San Francisco
- Nancy L. Weigel, Baylor College of Medicine
- Stuart K. Williams, Thomas Jefferson University
- Barbara J. Wold, California Institute of Technology

=== 1984 ===
- Richard W. Aldrich, Yale University
- Steven A. Benner, Harvard University and Harvard School of Public Health
- Carlos J. Bustamante, University of New Mexico
- Thomas F. Donahue, Northwestern University
- Susan K. Dutcher, University of Colorado
- Scott D. Emr, California Institute of Technology
- Stephen L. Gluck, The University of Chicago
- R. Scott Hawley, Albert Einstein College of Medicine
- Paul B. Hopkins, University of Washington
- Michele Jungery, Harvard University and Harvard School of Public Health
- Michael Karin, University of Southern California
- Brian G. Van Ness, University of Iowa
- Vincent R. Racaniello, Columbia University
- Douglas C. Rees, University of California, Los Angeles
- Pate Skene, Stanford University
- Tom H. Stevens, University of Oregon
- Dennis K. Stone, University of Texas Southwestern Medical Center
- Thomas D. Tullius, The Johns Hopkins University
- Edgar T. Walters, University of Texas Health Science Center at Houston
- Jean Y.J. Wang, University of California, San Diego

=== 1985 ===
- Daniel J. Chin, University of California, San Francisco
- John W. Frost, Stanford University
- Margaret T. Fuller, University of Colorado
- James F. Gusella, Harvard University and Harvard School of Public Health
- Adrian C. Hayday, Yale University
- Raphael C. Lee, Massachusetts Institute of Technology
- Michael S. Levine, Columbia University
- Daniel I. H. Linzer, Northwestern University
- William J. McGinnis, Yale University
- Edward G. Moczydlowski, University of Cincinnati Medical Center
- John W. Newport, University of California, San Diego
- Arthur Pardi, Rutgers, The State University of New Jersey
- Richard C. Parker, Columbia University
- Peter G. Schultz, University of California, Berkeley
- Matthew P. Scott University of Colorado
- Joseph S. Takahashi, Northwestern University
- Lex H. T. Van der Ploeg, Columbia University
- Barbara T. Wakimoto, University of Washington
- Jonathan Widom, University of Illinois at Urbana Champaign
- Chi-Huey Wong, Texas A&M University

=== 1986 ===
- William H. Armstrong, University of California, Berkeley
- Jef D. Boeke, The Johns Hopkins University
- Constance L. Cepko, Harvard University and Harvard School of Public Health
- Judith S. Eisen, University of Oregon
- Kenneth S. Feldman, The Pennsylvania State University
- Michael R. Green, Harvard University and Harvard School of Public Health
- Jonathan G. Izant, Yale University
- Michael Kahn, University of Illinois at Chicago
- Cynthia J. Kenyon, University of California, San Francisco
- Kevin L. Kirk, University of Alabama at Birmingham
- John A. Leigh, University of Washington
- Dan R. Littman, University of California, San Francisco
- Vincent L. Pecoraro, University of Michigan Medical School
- Garabed G. Sahagian, Tufts University
- Molly Schmid, Princeton University
- Sara E. Via, University of Iowa
- Michael P. Yaffe, University of California, San Diego
- Kenneth S. Zaret, Brown University

=== 1987 ===
- David J. Anderson, California Institute of Technology
- Jeremy M. Berg, The Johns Hopkins University
- Brent H. Cochran, Massachusetts Institute of Technology
- James W. Golden, Texas A&M University
- Michael E. Greenberg, Harvard University and Harvard School of Public Health
- Iva S. Greenwald, Princeton University
- Diana K. Hawley, University of Oregon
- Ralph R. Isberg, Tufts University
- Reid C. Johnson, University of California, Los Angeles
- Karla A. Kirkegaard, University of Colorado
- David M. Kranz, University of Illinois at Urbana Champaign
- Robert C. Landick, Washington University
- Mark A. Lehrman, University of Texas Southwestern Medical Center
- Daniel Margoliash, The University of Chicago
- Kelly E. Mayo, Northwestern University
- Richard M. Myers, University of California, San Francisco
- Thomas V. O'Halloran, Northwestern University
- Ronald D. Vale, University of California, San Francisco

=== 1988 ===
- Allan Bradley, Baylor College of Medicine
- Vicki L. Chandler, University of Oregon
- Fred E. Cohen, University of California, San Francisco
- Trisha N. Davis, University of Washington
- Samuel H. Gellman, University of Wisconsin - Madison
- Howard D. Lipshitz, California Institute of Technology
- Terry P. Lybrand, University of Minnesota
- Sabeeha Merchant, University of California, Los Angeles
- Terry L. Orr-Weaver, Massachusetts Institute of Technology
- David M. Shore, Columbia University
- Steven O. Smith, Yale University
- Hermann Steller, Massachusetts Institute of Technology
- Paul W. Sternberg, California Institute of Technology
- James H. Thomas, University of Washington
- Gerald S. Wilkinson, University of Maryland, Medical School

=== 1989 ===
- Rene Bernards, Harvard University and Harvard School of Public Health
- David W. Christianson, University of Pennsylvania
- Richard H. Ebright, Rutgers, The State University of New Jersey
- Daniel E. Kahne, Princeton University
- William H. Kane, Duke University
- Manfred J. Lohka, University of Colorado
- Susan K. McConnell, Stanford University
- Aaron P. Mitchell, Columbia University
- Timothy J. Mitchison, University of California, San Francisco
- Gaetano T. Montelione, Rutgers, The State University of New Jersey
- Keith E. Mostov, University of California, San Francisco
- Alexandra C. Newton, Indiana University
- David C. Page, Massachusetts Institute of Technology
- Ron M. Prywes, Columbia University
- Scott D. Rychnovsky, University of Minnesota
- John C. Schimenti, Case Western Reserve University
- Wesley C. Van Voorhis, University of Washington

=== 1990 ===
- Jean S. Baum, Rutgers, The State University of New Jersey
- Mark D. Biggin, Yale University
- David Alan Brow, University of Wisconsin - Madison
- Kenneth C. Burtis, University of California, Davis
- Chris Q. Doe, University of Illinois at Urbana Champaign
- David G. Drubin, University of California, Berkeley
- Jeff Gelles, Brandeis University
- Joseph Holoshitz, University of Michigan Medical School
- Stuart K. Kim, Stanford University
- David Kimelman, University of Washington
- Gilles J. Laurent, California Institute of Technology
- Peter Lobel, University of Medicine & Dentistry of New Jersey
- David O. Morgan, University of California, San Francisco
- Roy R. Parker, University of Arizona
- Ernest G. Peralta, Harvard University and Harvard School of Public Health
- Ronald T. Raines, University of Wisconsin - Madison
- Trina A. Schroer, The Johns Hopkins University
- Gregory L. Verdine, Harvard University and Harvard School of Public Health

=== 1991 ===
- Eric V. Anslyn, The University of Texas at Austin
- Albert J. Courey, University of California, Los Angeles
- Todd R. Evans, University of Pittsburgh
- Gregory K. Farber, The Pennsylvania State University
- James E. Ferrell, University of Wisconsin - Madison
- Alan D. Friedman, The Johns Hopkins University
- Jorge E. Galan, Stony Brook University
- M. Reza Ghadiri, Scripps Research Institute
- Ann Hochschild, Harvard University and Harvard School of Public Health
- Brent L. Iverson, The University of Texas at Austin
- Jeffrey W. Kelly, Texas A&M University
- Richard S. Mann, Columbia University
- Cornelis Murre, University of California, San Diego
- Tamar Schlick, New York University
- Marc Tessier-Lavigne, University of California, San Francisco
- Michael Therien, University of Pennsylvania
- James R. Williamson, Massachusetts Institute of Technology
- Astar Winoto, University of California, Berkeley

=== 1992 ===
- Cornelia I. Bargmann, University of California, San Francisco
- Warren F. Beck, Vanderbilt University
- Alan D. Bender, Indiana University
- Christopher C. Goodnow, Stanford University
- Kathleen L. Gould, Vanderbilt University
- Mark W. Hochstrasser, The University of Chicago
- Chris A. Kaiser, Massachusetts Institute of Technology
- Elizabeth A. Komives, University of California, San Diego
- Mitzi I. Kuroda, Baylor College of Medicine
- Yang Liu, New York University
- Mark Peifer, University of North Carolina
- B. Franklin Pugh, The Pennsylvania State University
- Joel H. Rothman, University of Wisconsin - Madison
- Alan B. Sachs, University of California, Berkeley
- Hazel L. Sive, Massachusetts Institute of Technology
- William B. Tolman, University of Minnesota
- Thomas F. Vogt, Princeton University

=== 1993 ===
- Natalie G. Ahn, University of Colorado
- David T. Burke, University of Michigan Medical School
- Allison J. Doupe, University of California, San Francisco
- Min Han, University of Colorado
- Lizbeth K. Hedstrom, Brandeis University
- Daniel Herschlag, Stanford University
- Tyler Jacks, Massachusetts Institute of Technology
- Gregg B. Morin, University of California, Davis
- Anna Marie Pyle, Columbia University
- Alexander Y. Rudensky, University of Washington
- Michael A. Simon, Stanford University
- Mark J. Solomon, Yale University
- Sriram Subramaniam, The Johns Hopkins University
- Wesley I. Sundquist, University of Utah
- Jonathan V. Sweedler, University of Illinois at Urbana Champaign

=== 1994 ===
- Ben A. Barres, Stanford University
- Lorena S. Beese, Duke University
- John S. Chant, Harvard University and Harvard School of Public Health
- Kathleen R. Foltz, University of California, Santa Barbara
- Brian G. Fox, University of Wisconsin - Madison
- Xiang-Dong Fu, University of California, San Diego
- J. Eric Gouaux, The University of Chicago
- Kay E. Holekamp, Michigan State University
- Richard A. Lang, New York University
- Daniel J. Leahy, The Johns Hopkins University
- Jun Liu, Massachusetts Institute of Technology
- Shawn R. Lockery, University of Oregon
- Lawrence S. Mathews, University of Michigan Medical School
- Stephen L. Mayo, California Institute of Technology
- Kenneth Miller, University of California, San Francisco
- Melissa J. Moore, Brandeis University
- Arthur G. Palmer, Columbia University

=== 1995 ===
- Nancy L. Allbritton, University of California, Irvine
- T. Keith Blackwell, Harvard University and Harvard School of Public Health
- David S. Bredt, University of California, San Francisco
- David D. Chang, University of California, Los Angeles
- Raymond J. Deshaies, California Institute of Technology
- Paul A. DiMilla, Carnegie Mellon University
- Ali Hemmati-Brivanlou, The Rockefeller University
- Michael P. Hendrich, Carnegie Mellon University
- Frederick M. Hughson, Princeton University
- Adam Kuspa, Baylor College of Medicine
- Daniel J. Lew, Duke University
- Joachim J. Li, University of California, San Francisco
- Michael L. Nonet, Washington University
- Yeon-Kyun Shin, University of California, Berkeley
- Peter K. Sorger, Massachusetts Institute of Technology
- Timothy P. Stearns, Stanford University

=== 1996 ===
- Kavita Arora, University of California, Irvine
- Stephen Bell, Massachusetts Institute of Technology
- J. Martin Bollinger, Jr., The Pennsylvania State University
- Kyle W. Cunningham, The Johns Hopkins University
- Jennifer A. Doudna, Yale University
- James W. Erickson, Columbia University
- Alex L. Kolodkin, The Johns Hopkins University
- Barbara N. Kunkel, Washington University
- Peter Mombaerts, The Rockefeller University
- Mary Shannon Moore, Baylor College of Medicine
- Milan Mrksich, The University of Chicago
- Piali Sengupta, Brandeis University
- Alice Telesnitsky, University of Michigan Medical School
- Anne M. Villeneuve, Stanford University
- Chyung-Ru Wang, The University of Chicago

=== 1997 ===
- David P. Bartel, Massachusetts Institute of Technology
- Judith L. Bender, The Johns Hopkins University
- Kendal S. Broadie, University of Utah
- Robert C. Dunn, University of Kansas
- Randolph Y. Hampton, University of California, San Diego
- Bruce A. Hay, California Institute of Technology
- Kristin A. Hogquist, University of Minnesota
- Wendell A. Lim, University of California, San Francisco
- Daphne K. Preuss, The University of Chicago
- Tito A. Serafini, University of California, Berkeley
- Geraldine C. Seydoux, The Johns Hopkins University
- Ben Shen, University of California, Davis
- Kevan M. Shokat, Princeton University
- Scott A. Strobel, Yale University
- Jonathan S. Weissman, University of California, San Francisco

=== 1998 ===
- Zhijian James Chen, University of Texas Southwestern Medical Center
- Benjamin F. Cravatt, Scripps Research Institute
- Catherine G. Dulac, Harvard University and Harvard School of Public Health
- Ueli Grossniklaus, Cold Spring Harbor Laboratory
- Anne C. Hart, Harvard University Medical School
- Linda A. Hicke, Northwestern University
- Christopher J. Lee, University of California, Los Angeles
- Krishna K. Niyogi, University of California, Berkeley
- Evgeny A. Nudler, New York University
- Kit J. Pogliano, University of California, San Diego
- Renee A. Reijo Pera, University of California, San Francisco
- Michael F. Rexach, Stanford University
- Jason B. Shear, The University of Texas at Austin
- William C. Skarnes, University of California, Berkeley
- Kevin M. Weeks, University of North Carolina

=== 1999 ===
- Carrolee Barlow, Salk Institute for Biological Studies
- Brendan P. Cormack, The Johns Hopkins University
- Kevin H. Gardner, University of Texas Southwestern Medical Center
- Rachel D. Green, The Johns Hopkins University
- Phyllis I. Hanson, Washington University
- Pehr A. B. Harbury, Stanford University
- Jin Jiang, University of Texas Southwestern Medical Center
- Ka Yee C. Lee, The University of Chicago
- Karolin Luger, Colorado State University
- William W. Metcalf, University of Illinois at Urbana Champaign
- Dale A. Ramsden, University of North Carolina
- Pamela Schwartzberg, National Institutes of Health
- Yigong Shi, Princeton University
- Frederic E. Theunissen, University of California, Berkeley
- Ding Xue, University of Colorado

=== 2000 ===
- James H. Doudna Cate, Massachusetts Institute of Technology
- Greg DeAngelis, Washington University
- Joseph Gleeson, University of California, San Diego
- Oliver Hobert, Columbia University
- Eric Holland, University of Texas M.D. Anderson Cancer Center-Houston
- Steven Jacobsen, University of California, Los Angeles
- Neil Kelleher, University of Illinois at Urbana Champaign
- Bruce Lahn, The University of Chicago
- David R. Liu, Harvard University and Harvard School of Public Health
- Ruslan Medzhitov, Yale University
- Gero Miesenböck, Memorial Sloan-Kettering Cancer Center
- Sean Morrison, University of Michigan Medical School
- Indira Raman, Northwestern University
- Sharon Thompson-Schill, University of Pennsylvania
- Karsten Weis, University of California, Berkeley

=== 2001 ===
- Steven E. Brenner, University of California, Berkeley
- Kenneth C. Catania, Vanderbilt University
- Michael J. Caterina, The Johns Hopkins University
- Joseph DeRisi, University of California, San Francisco
- Catherine L. Drennan, Massachusetts Institute of Technology
- Guowei Fang, Stanford University
- Elizabeth A. Finch, Emory University
- Su Guo, University of California, San Francisco
- Taekjip Ha, University of Illinois at Urbana Champaign
- Tonya L. Kuhl, University of California, Davis
- J. Troy Littleton, Massachusetts Institute of Technology
- Guangbin Luo, Case Western Reserve University
- Zachary F. Mainen, Cold Spring Harbor Laboratory
- W. Matthew Michael, Harvard University and Harvard School of Public Health
- Noam Sobel, University of California, Berkeley

=== 2002 ===
- David Bilder, University of California, Berkeley
- Lera Boroditsky, Massachusetts Institute of Technology
- Brian R. Crane, Cornell University
- Hironori Funabiki, The Rockefeller University
- Jay T. Groves, University of California, Berkeley
- Rustem F. Ismagilov, The University of Chicago
- Daniel L. Minor, University of California, San Francisco
- Victor Munoz, University of Maryland, Medical School
- Axel Nohturfft, Harvard University and Harvard School of Public Health
- Bernardo L. Sabatini, Harvard University Medical School
- Ram Samudrala, University of Washington
- Peter R. Scheiffele, Columbia University
- Douglas Smith, University of California, San Diego
- Peter A. Takizawa, Yale University
- Jack Taunton, University of California, San Francisco

=== 2003 ===
- Michael Brainard, University of California, San Francisco
- Jay Brenman, University of North Carolina
- Christopher Burge, Massachusetts Institute of Technology
- Anjen Chenn, Northwestern University
- Thomas R. Clandinin, Stanford University
- Luis Rene Garcia, Texas A&M University
- Barth D. Grant, Rutgers, The State University of New Jersey
- Chuan He, The University of Chicago
- Brian K. Kennedy, University of Washington
- Walther H. Mothes, Yale University
- Maho Niwa, University of California, San Diego
- F. Nina Papavasiliou, The Rockefeller University
- Stanislav Y. Shvartsman, Princeton University
- Milan N. Stojanovic, Columbia University
- Xiaowei Zhuang, Harvard University and Harvard School of Public Health

=== 2004 ===
- Kaveh Ashrafi, University of California, San Francisco
- Matthew S. Bogyo, Stanford University
- Justin C. Crowley, Carnegie Mellon University
- Ricardo E. Dolmetsch, Stanford University
- Michael B. Elowitz, California Institute of Technology
- Kristina Hakansson, University of Michigan Medical School
- Reuben S. Harris, University of Minnesota
- Jeffrey D. Hartgerink, Rice University
- Grant J. Jensen, California Institute of Technology
- Youxing Jiang, University of Texas Southwestern Medical Center
- Brian A. Kuhlman, University of North Carolina
- Amy E. Pasquinelli, University of California, San Diego
- Jared P. Rutter, University of Utah
- Saba Valadkhan, Case Western Reserve University
- David P. Zenisek, Yale University

=== 2005 ===
- Phil S. Baran, Scripps Research Institute
- Emily H. Y. Cheng, Washington University
- Aaron R. Dinner, The University of Chicago
- Nicole J. Francis, Harvard University and Harvard School of Public Health
- Eileen A. Hebets, University of California, Berkeley
- Melissa S. Jurica, University of California, Santa Cruz
- John D. MacMicking, Yale University
- Harmit Malik, Fred Hutchinson Cancer Research Center
- Wallace F. Marshall, University of California, San Francisco
- Kang Shen, Stanford University
- Toshiyasu Taniguchi, Fred Hutchinson Cancer Research Center
- Antoine M. van Oijen, Harvard University Medical School
- Jing Wang, University of California, San Diego
- Wade Winkler, University of Texas Southwestern Medical Center
- Li I. Zhang, University of Southern California

=== 2006 ===
- Charles L. Asbury, University of Washington
- Elizabeth H. Chen, The Johns Hopkins University
- YiQin Gao, Texas A&M University
- Christy L. Haynes, University of Minnesota
- Jan Liphardt, University of California, Berkeley
- L. Charles Murtaugh, University of Utah
- John P. O'Doherty, California Institute of Technology
- Randen L. Patterson, The Pennsylvania State University
- Peter W. Reddien, Massachusetts Institute of Technology
- Kausik Si, Stowers Institute for Medical Research
- Eric P. Skaar, Vanderbilt University
- Angelike M. Stathopoulos, California Institute of Technology
- Lei Wang, Salk Institute for Biological Studies
- Stanislav S. Zakharenko, St. Jude Children's Research Hospital
- Jennifer A. Zallen, Memorial Sloan-Kettering Cancer Center

=== 2007 ===
- Erin J. Adams, The University of Chicago
- Michael A. Beer, The Johns Hopkins University
- Julie Magarian Blander, Icahn School of Medicine at Mount Sinai
- Sean F. Brady, The Rockefeller University
- William M. Clemons, California Institute of Technology
- Or P. Gozani, Stanford University
- Wesley B. Grueber, Columbia University
- Christopher J. Lowe, Stanford University
- Sarkis K. Mazmanian, California Institute of Technology
- Dariush Mozaffarian, Harvard University and Harvard School of Public Health
- Gia Voeltz, University of Colorado
- Orion D. Weiner, University of California, San Francisco
- Sarah M. N. Woolley, Columbia University
- Joanna K. Wysocka, Stanford University
- Mark J. Zylka, University of North Carolina

=== 2008 ===
- Emre Aksay, Cornell University
- Michael Axtell, The Pennsylvania State University
- Gill Bejerano, Stanford University
- Iain D. Couzin, Princeton University
- Lin He, University of California, Berkeley
- Morgan Huse, Memorial Sloan-Kettering Cancer Center
- Eric S. Huseby, University of Massachusetts Medical School
- Elizabeth A. Kensinger, Boston College
- Michael A. Lampson, University of Pennsylvania
- Tae-Hee Lee, The Pennsylvania State University
- Antonis Rokas, Vanderbilt University
- Alan Saghatelian, Harvard University and Harvard School of Public Health
- Tatyana O. Sharpee, Salk Institute for Biological Studies
- Douglas B. Weibel, University of Wisconsin - Madison
- Yukiko Yamashita, University of Michigan Medical School

=== 2009 ===
- Philip H. Bradley, Fred Hutchinson Cancer Research Center
- Iain M. Cheeseman, Massachusetts Institute of Technology
- Danica Chen, University of California, Berkeley
- Mauro Costa-Mattioli, Baylor College of Medicine
- Bianxiao Cui, Stanford University
- Gregory S. Engel, The University of Chicago
- Nevan J. Krogan, University of California, San Francisco
- Andreas Martin, University of California, Berkeley
- Javier F. Medina, University of Pennsylvania
- John Novembre, University of California, Los Angeles
- Benjamin Ohlstein, Columbia University
- John L. Rinn, Harvard University Medical School
- Beth A. Shapiro, The Pennsylvania State University
- Doris Y. Tsao, California Institute of Technology
- Weiwei Zhong, Rice University

=== 2010 ===
- Theodor Agapie, California Institute of Technology
- David Biron, The University of Chicago
- Sreekanth H. Chalasani, Salk Institute for Biological Studies
- Heather R. Christofk, University of California, Los Angeles
- Ila R. Fiete, The University of Texas at Austin
- Thomas Gregor, Princeton University
- Katherine A. Henzler-Wildman, Washington University
- Seth B. Herzon, Yale University
- Bo Huang, University of California, San Francisco
- Nelson C. Lau, Brandeis University
- David L. McLean, Northwestern University
- Maxence V. Nachury, Stanford University School of Medicine
- E. James Petersson, University of Pennsylvania
- Antonina I. Roll-Mecak, National Institutes of Health
- Emily R. Troemel, University of California, San Diego

=== 2011 ===
- Alexei A. Aravin, California Institute of Technology
- Sandeep R. Datta, Harvard University Medical School
- Danica G. Fujimori, University of California, San Francisco
- Wendy S. Garrett, Harvard University and Harvard School of Public Health
- Richard E. Green, University of California, Santa Cruz
- Nicholas T. Ingolia, Carnegie Institution of Washington
- Megan C. King, Yale University
- Jared C. Lewis, The University of Chicago
- Attila Losonczy, Columbia University
- Luciano A. Marraffini, The Rockefeller University
- Elizabeth M. Nolan, Massachusetts Institute of Technology
- David J. Pagliarini, University of Wisconsin - Madison
- Patrick Seale, University of Pennsylvania
- Samuel Sidi, Icahn School of Medicine at Mount Sinai
- Joseph C. Sun, Memorial Sloan-Kettering Cancer Center

=== 2012 ===
- Emily P. Balskus, Harvard University and Harvard School of Public Health
- Jesse D. Bloom, Fred Hutchinson Cancer Research Center
- Clifford P. Brangwynne, Princeton University
- Mark M. Churchland, Columbia University
- Elissa A. Hallem, University of California, Los Angeles
- Daniel J. Kronauer, The Rockefeller University
- Katja A. Lamia, Scripps Research Institute
- Gaby Maimon, The Rockefeller University
- Cristopher M. Niell, University of Oregon
- Daniel K. Nomura, University of California, Berkeley
- Daniel M. Rosenbaum, University of Texas Southwestern Medical Center
- Susumu Takahashi, University of Southern California
- David M. Tobin, Duke University
- Miguel A. Zaratiegui-Biurrun, Rutgers, The State University of New Jersey
- Feng Zhang, Massachusetts Institute of Technology

=== 2013 ===
- Trever Bivona, University of California, San Francisco
- Jason M. Crawford, Yale University
- Danelle Devenport, Princeton University
- Guangbin Dong, The University of Texas at Austin
- Sophie Dumont, University of California, San Francisco
- Adam S. Frost, University of Utah
- Sunil P. Gandhi, University of California, Irvine
- Ethan C. Garner, Harvard University and Harvard School of Public Health
- Rana K. Gupta, University of Texas Southwestern Medical Center
- Christopher D. Harvey, Harvard University Medical School
- Brenton D. Hoffman, Duke University
- Christian M. Metallo, University of California, San Diego
- Mary Kristy Red-Horse, Stanford University
- Bozhi Tian, The University of Chicago
- Eduardo M. Torres, University of Massachusetts Medical School

=== 2014 ===
- Janelle S. Ayres, Salk Institute for Biological Studies
- Brenda L. Bloodgood, University of California, San Diego
- Amie K. Boal, The Pennsylvania State University
- Irene A. Chen, University of California, Santa Barbara
- Kwanghun Chung, Massachusetts Institute of Technology
- Damon A. Clark, Yale University
- James S. Fraser, University of California, San Francisco
- Mitchell Guttman, California Institute of Technology
- Daniel F. Jarosz, Stanford University School of Medicine
- Gabriel C. Lander, Scripps Research Institute
- Kirk E. Lohmueller, University of California, Los Angeles
- Mohammad R. Seyedsayamdost, Princeton University
- Matthew Simon, Yale University
- Sarah A. Stanley, University of California, Berkeley
- Hani Zaher, Washington University

=== 2015 ===
- Roberto Bonasio, University of Pennsylvania
- Kimberly Cooper, University of California, San Diego
- Lawrence David, Duke University
- Gül Dölen, The Johns Hopkins University
- Neil Ganem, Boston University
- Adam Hughes, University of Utah
- Jun Huh, University of Massachusetts Medical School
- Sriram Kosuri, University of California, Los Angeles
- Joel Kralj, University of Colorado
- Byungkook Lim, University of California, San Diego
- Yuki Oka, California Institute of Technology
- Kaoru Saijo, University of California, Berkeley
- Alex Shalek, Massachusetts Institute of Technology
- Duncan Smith, New York University
- Jing-Ke Weng, Whitehead Institute for Biomedical Research

=== 2016 ===
- Alexis Battle, The Johns Hopkins University
- Kivanç Birsoy, The Rockefeller University
- Hernan Garcia, University of California, Berkeley
- Mike Henne, University of Texas Southwestern Medical Center
- Yevgenia Kozorovitskiy, Northwestern University
- Gene-Wei Li, Massachusetts Institute of Technology
- Carolyn McBride, Princeton University
- Sarah Slavoff, Yale University
- Gregory Sonnenberg, Cornell University
- Sabrina Spencer, University of Colorado
- Mansi Srivastava, Harvard University and Harvard School of Public Health
- Matthew Traxler, University of California, Berkeley
- Peter Turnbaugh, University of California, San Francisco
- Michael Yartsev, University of California, Berkeley
- Marija Zanic, Vanderbilt University

=== 2017 ===
- Nicholas Arpaia, Columbia University
- Eiman Azim, Salk Institute for Biological Studies
- Alistair Boettiger, Stanford University
- Jingyi Fei, The University of Chicago
- Kendra Frederick, University of Texas Southwestern Medical Center
- Weizhe Hong, University of California, Los Angeles
- Todd Hyster, Princeton University
- Amy Si-Ying Lee, Brandeis University
- Nuo Li, Baylor College of Medicine
- Diana Libuda, University of Oregon
- Robert McGinty, University of North Carolina
- Jose Rodriguez, University of California, Los Angeles
- John Tuthill, University of Washington
- Gabriel Victora, The Rockefeller University
- Rebecca Voorhees, California Institute of Technology

=== 2018 ===
- Andrés Bendesky, Columbia University
- Gira Bhabha, New York University
- Anne-Ruxandra Carvunis, University of Pittsburgh
- Lydia Finley, Memorial Sloan-Kettering Cancer Center
- Doeke R. Hekstra, Harvard University and Harvard School of Public Health
- Richard K. Hite, Memorial Sloan-Kettering Cancer Center
- Enfu Hui, University of California, San Diego
- Kate D. Meyer, Duke University
- Priya Rajasethupathy, The Rockefeller University
- Hesper Rego, Yale University
- Mark Sheffield, The University of Chicago
- Vincent S. Tagliabracci, University of Texas Southwestern Medical Center
- Jakob H. von Moltke, University of Washington
- Taia Wang, Stanford University
- Sarah E. Zanders, Stowers Institute for Medical Research

=== 2019 ===
- Joshua Arribere, University of California, Santa Cruz
- Nicholas Bellono, Harvard University and Harvard School of Public Health
- Joseph Bondy-Denomy, University of California, San Francisco
- Jennifer Bridwell-Rabb, University of Michigan Medical School
- Paul Greer, University of Massachusetts Medical School
- Kelley Harris, University of Washington
- Wesley Legant, University of North Carolina
- Bluma Lesch, Yale University
- Maayan Levy, University of Pennsylvania
- Cressida Madigan, University of California, San Diego
- Ricardo Mallarino, Princeton University
- Aashish Manglik, University of California, San Francisco
- Andrew Miri, Northwestern University
- Caroline Runyan, University of Pittsburgh
- David Schneider, New York University

=== 2020 ===
- Britt Adamson, Princeton University
- Lalit Beura, Brown University
- Hachung Chung, Columbia University
- Daria Esterhazy, The University of Chicago
- Mark A. Herzik, University of California, San Diego
- Hidehiko Inagaki, Max Planck Florida Institute for Neuroscience
- Sung Soo Kim, University of California, Santa Barbara
- Sangjin Kim, University of Illinois at Urbana Champaign
- Laura D. Lewis, Boston University
- Dipti Nayak, University of California, Berkeley
- Lisa Olshansky, University of Illinois at Urbana Champaign
- Lauren L. Orefice, Harvard University Medical School
- Upasna Sharma, University of California, Santa Cruz
- Amy E. Shyer, The Rockefeller University
- Xiao Wang, The Broad Institute of MIT and Harvard

=== 2021 ===
- Ahmed Abdelfattah, Brown University
- Fei Chen, The Broad Institute of the Massachusetts Institute of Technology and Harvard University
- Bradley H. Dickerson, University of North Carolina at Chapel Hill
- Yun Ding, University of Pennsylvania
- Vikram Gadagkar, The Trustees of Columbia University in the City of New York
- Brooke Meghan Gardner, University of California, Santa Barbara
- Smita Gopinath, Harvard University and Harvard School of Public Health
- Tyler Grove, Albert Einstein College Of Medicine
- Isha H. Jain, Gladstone/University of California, San Francisco
- Sam Light, The University of Chicago
- Matthew Lovett-Barron, University of California, San Diego
- Molly Schumer, Stanford University
- Weixin Tang, The University of Chicago
- Ekaterina V. Vinogradova, The Rockefeller University
- Daniel Elger Wagner, University of California, San Francisco

=== 2022 ===
- Arkarup Banerjee, Cold Spring Harbor Laboratory
- Lindsay Case, Massachusetts Institute of Technology
- Shasha Chong, California Institute of Technology
- Ian C. Fiebelkorn, University of Rochester
- Kevin Forsberg, University of Texas Southwestern Medical Center
- Ruixuan Gao, University of Illinois Chicago
- Christina Kim, University of California, Davis
- Amanda J. Lea, Vanderbilt University
- Kara L. McKinley, President and Fellows of Harvard College
- Sampriti Mukherjee, The University of Chicago
- Serena Sanulli, Stanford University
- Edward C. Twomey, The Johns Hopkins University
- Nicholas Wu, University of Illinois at Urbana-Champaign
- Guangyu Robert Yang, Massachusetts Institute of Technology
- Meg A. Younger, Boston University

== See also ==
- List of biomedical science awards
