= Yukiko Yamashita =

American developmental biologist

- Born: 1971 (age 54–55)
- Education: Kyoto University, Stanford University
- Awards: Searle Scholar, 2008; MacArthur Fellowship, 2011; W.M. Keck Foundation, 2012; Tsuneko & Reiji Okazaki Award, 2016
- Scientific career
- Fields: Developmental biology
- Workplaces: Whitehead Institute for Biomedical Research
- Academic advisors: Margaret T. Fuller

Yukiko Yamashita (born 1971) is an American developmental biologist. She joined the Whitehead Institute in September 2020 and has been appointed a professor of biology at the Massachusetts Institute of Technology (MIT). She is the inaugural incumbent of the Susan Lindquist Chair for Women in Science at Whitehead Institute. She was previously a faculty member of the University of Michigan Life Sciences Institute and a professor in the Department of Cell and Developmental Biology at the University of Michigan Medical School. She was appointed an HHMI Investigator in 2013. In November 2013 she received a 5-year appointment as the James Playfair McMurrich Collegiate Professor of the Life Sciences at the University of Michigan Medical School. Her current research at the Whitehead Institute and MIT focuses on how germline immortality is maintained by germline stem cell behavior .

She received a Tsuneko & Reiji Okazaki Award, for those who contributed to the field of biology, in 2016, a Keck Foundation Award in 2012. She is a 2011 MacArthur Fellow and a 2008 Searle Scholar. Her other achievement are such as American Society for Cell Biology, Fellow in 2021, American Academy of Arts and Sciences Member in 2023, and National Academy of Sciences Member in 2025.

== Life ==
Yamashita grew up in Japan. She graduated from Kyoto University with a BS and PhD in biophysics in 1999, and was a postdoctoral fellow with Margaret T. Fuller at Stanford University from 2001 to 2006. She was chosen to be in the Michigan faculty in 2007 and was named as HHMI Investigator in 2014. She inventually became a member of Whitehead Institute and also a biology professor at MIT in 2020.
