= Liu Yang =

Liu Yang or Yang Liu may refer to:

- Emperor Ming of Han (28–75), personal name Liu Yang, emperor of the Han dynasty
- Liu Yang (taikonaut) (born 1978), first Chinese woman astronaut launched into space
- Liu Yang (violinist), Chinese classical violinist
- Liu Yang (politician), Chinese politician.
- Yang Liu (dancer), member of the Royal New Zealand Ballet
- Yang Liu (speech recognition), researcher for Amazon Alexa
- Yang Xinhai, Chinese serial killer
- Yang Liu (immunologist), Chinese-American immunologist

== Sportspeople ==
- Liu Yang (high jumper) (born 1986), Chinese high jumper
- Liu Yang (shot putter) (born 1986), Chinese shot putter
- Liu Yang (wheelchair racer) (born 1990), Chinese wheelchair racer
- Liu Yang (footballer, born 1991), Chinese football player
- Liu Yang (footballer, born 1995), Chinese football player
- Liu Yang (gymnast, born 1994), Chinese gymnast
- Liu Yang (gymnast, born 2000), Chinese gymnast
- Liu Yang (badminton) (born 2003), Chinese badminton player
- Yang Liu (boxer) (born 1992), Chinese boxer
- Yang Liu (field hockey), Chinese field hockey player

== See also ==
- Liuyang, city in China
- Yangliu township, Shandong
- Yangliu township, Anhui
