= Turnbaugh =

Turnbaugh is a surname. Notable people with the surname include:

- Annette Turnbaugh, American politician
- Peter J. Turnbaugh (born c. 1981), American microbiologist
