= Min Han =

Chinese-American research scientist

Min Han is a Chinese‑American geneticist and molecular biologist at the University of Colorado Boulder, currently serving as a Distinguished Professor in the Department of Molecular, Cellular & Developmental Biology.

== Early life and education ==
Han was born in Shanghai, China. During his youth, Han experienced tracheal stenosis, which required multiple surgeries. This interrupted his classroom education and required him to continue his education independently.

Han attended Peking University in 1978 and received his B.S. in biochemistry in 1982. He participated in the China-United States Biochemistry Examination and Application (CUSBEA) program, in which selected Chinese Ph.D. students were sent to universities in the United States.

Han began graduate school in 1983 in Dr. Michael Grunstein's laboratory at UCLA to research histones and nucleosomes during transcription, and was granted a Ph.D. in 1988 in Molecular Biology. Han also did his postdoctoral work in Dr. Paul Sternberg's lab during his time in Caltech in developmental genetics from 1988 to 1991.

In 1991, Han began a research lab at the University of Colorado Boulder in the Department of Molecular, Cellular, and Developmental Biology. Han stated that his lab supports researchers and their individual projects. The lab has pursued a variety of research areas, such as lipids, KASH-SUN complexes, miRNAs, and genetic redundancy. Han became an Investigator of the Howard Hughes Medical Institute in 1997, was awarded the title of Distinguished Professor in 2019, and became a member of the American Academy of Arts and Sciences in 2024.

== Research ==
Han worked on exploring the functions of histone proteins in transcriptional regulation under the guidance of his graduate mentor Dr. Michael Grunstein. When Dr. Grunstein was awarded the Lasker Award in 2018, Han's 1988 Cell paper with Grunstein was listed as a key publication for the award.

As a post-doctoral scholar working with Dr. Paul Sternberg, Han discovered the C. elegans ras gene let-60 and its role in controlling developmental decisions.

Significant scientific discoveries made in the Min Han Lab at the University of Colorado Boulder include:

- Discovered and analyzed the roles of several regulators of the conserved RTK-RAS-MPK signaling pathway; discovered many unknown roles of tumor suppressors in development and stress responses.
- Established the concept of universal pairing of SUN-KASH proteins (LINC complexes) at the nuclear envelope and pioneered the study of their functions in multiple cellular/developmental events in both C. elegans and mice.
- Discovered the role of GW182 family proteins in miRISCs and pioneered a biochemical method to systematically analyze the in vivo miRNA-target interactions; discovered miRNA-like regulatory function for apoptotic caspases.
- Uncovered novel functions of fatty acid variants and multiple novel mechanisms by which animals sense the level of specific fatty acids and nucleotides to regulate animal development and behaviors.
- Discovered "surprising" beneficial roles for two bacteria-derived molecules in animal physiology that indicate new paradigms pertinent to microbe-host interactions (enterobactin and peptidoglycan muropeptides).

== Recognition and awards ==
- 2024 Elected Member of the American Academy of Arts and Sciences
- 2019 Named Distinguished Professor by the University of Colorado Boulder
- 2011 Elected Fellow of the American Association for the Advancement of Science
- 1997–2018 Investigator of the Howard Hughes Medical Institute (HHMI)
- 1993–1996 Searle Scholar
- 1992-1995 Basil O'Connor Scholar, March of Dimes Foundation
- 1991–1997 Lucille P. Markey Scholar
- 1988–1991 Fellow of the Life Science Research Foundation
