= Peter Sarnow =

German virologist

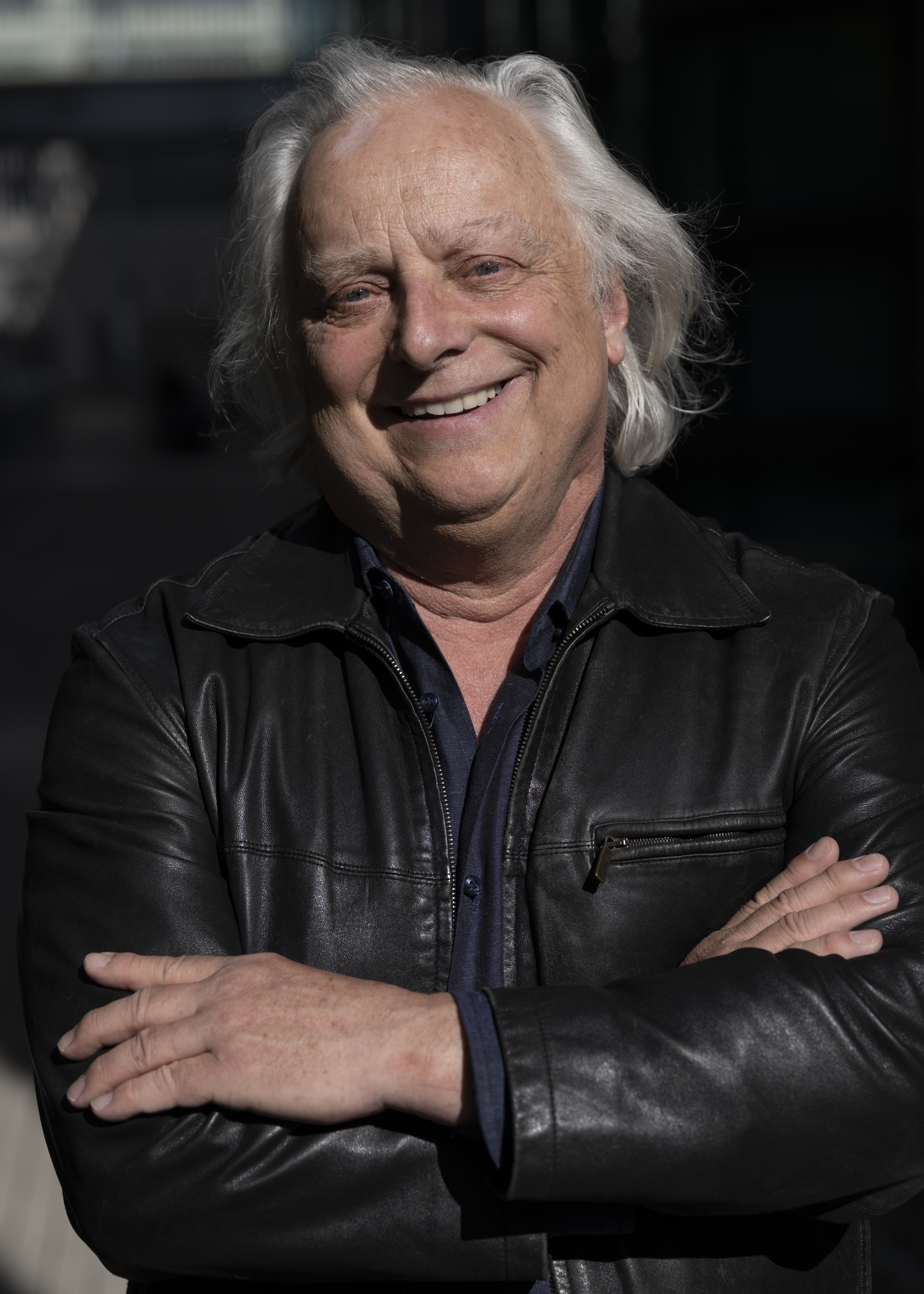
- Sarnow in 2021
- Born: Konstanz, Germany
- Spouse: Karla Kirkegaard

Academic background
- Education: MS, 1979, University of Konstanz; PhD, Microbiology, 1982, Stony Brook University
- Thesis: Characterization of the early Adenovirus type 5 antigens (1982)

Academic work
- Institutions: Stanford University; University of Colorado Health Sciences Center

Hans-Peter Sarnow is a German virologist. He is a professor of microbiology and immunology at Stanford University.

== Early life and education ==
Sarnow was born and raised in Konstanz, Germany. He completed his Master's degree at the University of Konstanz in 1979 before moving to the United States for his PhD at Stony Brook University. Upon earning his doctorate degree in 1982, Sarnow completed his postdoctoral research with David Baltimore at the Whitehead Institute.

== Career ==
Following his postdoctoral research, Sarnow became an assistant professor of molecular biology at the University of Colorado Health Sciences Center from 1986 until 1991. Early into his tenure, he discovered internal ribosome entry sites in cellular mRNAs and established a program to examine mRNA-ribosome interactions in mammalian cells. He moved up the ranks at the institution before ultimately leaving in 1996 to join the faculty at Stanford University. During his early tenure at Stanford, Sarnow and his research team identified miR-122 as a necessary mechanism to cause the hepatitis C virus uses to replicate and grow. He was also appointed an editor of the Virology Journal and elected a fellow of the American Association for the Advancement of Science. In 2010, Sarnow was appointed chair of microbiology and immunology at Stanford.

Prior to being replaced as department chair by David Schneider, Sarnow also became a member of Stanford Bio-X, the Stanford Maternal Child Health Research Institute, and the Stanford Cancer Institute. In 2020, he was elected to the National Academy of Sciences.

== Personal life ==
Sarnow is married to Karla Kirkegaard.
