= Jesse D. Bloom =

American virologist

Jesse D. Bloom is an American computational virologist and Professor in the Basic Sciences Division, the Public Health Sciences Division, and the Herbold Computational Biology Program, at the Fred Hutchinson Cancer Center. He is also an Investigator of the Howard Hughes Medical Institute, and an Affiliate Professor in the University of Washington departments of Genome Sciences and Microbiology.

== Education and career ==
Bloom obtained a B.S. in Biochemistry from the University of Chicago, an M.Phil. in Theoretical Chemistry from the University of Cambridge, and a Ph.D. in chemistry from Caltech advised by Frances Arnold. Following his Ph.D., he completed a postdoctoral fellowship in the laboratory of David Baltimore. He became a professor at the Fred Hutchinson Cancer Center in 2011 and an Investigator of the Howard Hughes Medical Institute in 2018.

== Research ==
Bloom's research focuses on the molecular evolution of viruses and viral proteins, particularly of rapidly-evolving RNA viruses like influenza, HIV, and SARS-CoV-2. His lab uses a combination of computational and experimental techniques to understand how changes in viral proteins result in immune escape, drug resistance, and shifts in host specificity. His group performed the first experimental study showing that human coronaviruses evolve to escape from human antibodies.

Bloom has helped lead the development of deep mutational scanning techniques for measuring the effects of large numbers of mutations in viral proteins in parallel. Notably, his laboratory provided the first map of the effects of mutations in the SARS-CoV-2 spike receptor binding domain on folding and ACE2 affinity. Using the same technique, Bloom's research group prospectively identified mutations in the SARS-CoV-2 spike protein that erode the immunity provided by both therapeutic antibodies and naturally elicited immune responses. His group has integrated these measurements into an antibody-escape calculator that is used to help track SARS-CoV-2 evolution. They also showed that the ability to bind human ACE2 is widespread and highly evolvable among natural SARS-related coronaviruses, highlighting the zoonotic potential of this family of viruses.

Bloom's scientific work has been published in top scientific journals including Science, Nature, and Cell.

In addition to his scientific publications, Bloom has authored several columns with Sarah Cobey in the New York Times about SARS-CoV-2 evolution.

Bloom has also argued that it is important for virologists to ensure that virology research is performed responsibly and does not create biosafety or biosecurity risks. He outlined his views in a column he published on the topic in the New York Times.

In 2021, Bloom was a co-author of a letter calling for further investigation of COVID-19 origins published in Science. Bloom's research on the origin of COVID-19 "raised the possibility that the Chinese government might be trying to hide evidence about the pandemic's early spread" and was the subject of a meeting with Anthony Fauci, the director of the National Institute of Allergy and Infectious Diseases (NIAID).

== Honors and awards ==
- 2026 Fellow of the National Academy of Sciences
- 2019 McDougall Mentoring Award
- 2018 HHMI Investigator
- 2017 Merck Irving S. Sigal Award from the American Society for Microbiology
- 2016 Ann Palmenberg Junior Investigator Award from the American Society for Virology
- 2016 HHMI-Simons Faculty Scholar
- 2015 Young Investigator in Virology Award
- 2015 Pew Scholar in Biomedical Sciences
- 2012 Searle Scholar Award
