= Vicki Chandler =

American geneticist

Vicki L. Chandler is a plant geneticist, a member of the National Science Board and currently the Provost and Chief Academic Officer of Minerva University. Her research focuses on gene silencing and paramutation.

== Early life and education ==
Chandler married at age 17, and divorced at age 19 with two daughters. While working as a secretary, she began attending Foothill College with the intention of studying marine biology. Two years later, she transferred to the University of California Berkeley, where she received a B.A. in biochemistry and studied under Randy Schekman. She completed a PhD in biochemistry at the University of California San Francisco in 1983 with Keith Yamamoto. She then moved to Stanford University, where she did a postdoctoral fellowship in genetics in the lab of Virginia Walbot.

== Career ==
Chandler was a member of the faculties of the University of Oregon and the University of Arizona. While at Oregon in 1988, she was named a Searle Scholar. In 1997, she moved to the University of Arizona, where she was a Regent’s professor in the Department of Plant Sciences and the Department of Molecular and Cellular Biology and Associate Director of the Institute for Biomedical Science and Biotechnology. Before joining the Keck Graduate Institute in 2015, she was the Chief Program Officer for Science for the Gordon and Betty Moore Foundation, beginning in 2009. She was the Chief Academic Officer and Dean of Faculty at Keck Graduate Institute.

Chandler was elected as a member of the National Academy of Sciences in 2002. She is also a fellow of the American Association for the Advancement of Science. She has also been awarded the Presidential Young Investigator Award, NSF Faculty Award for Women Scientists and Engineers, and NIH Director’s Pioneer Award. She also served on the Life Sciences jury for the Infosys Prize in 2014.

President Obama appointed Chandler to the National Science Board in 2014. She served on the board of the Searle Scholars Program from 2010 to 2015. Chandler was elected to the American Philosophical Society in 2015. She has served as president of the Genetics Society of America and of the American Society of Plant Biology.
