= Nina Papavasiliou =

Immunologist

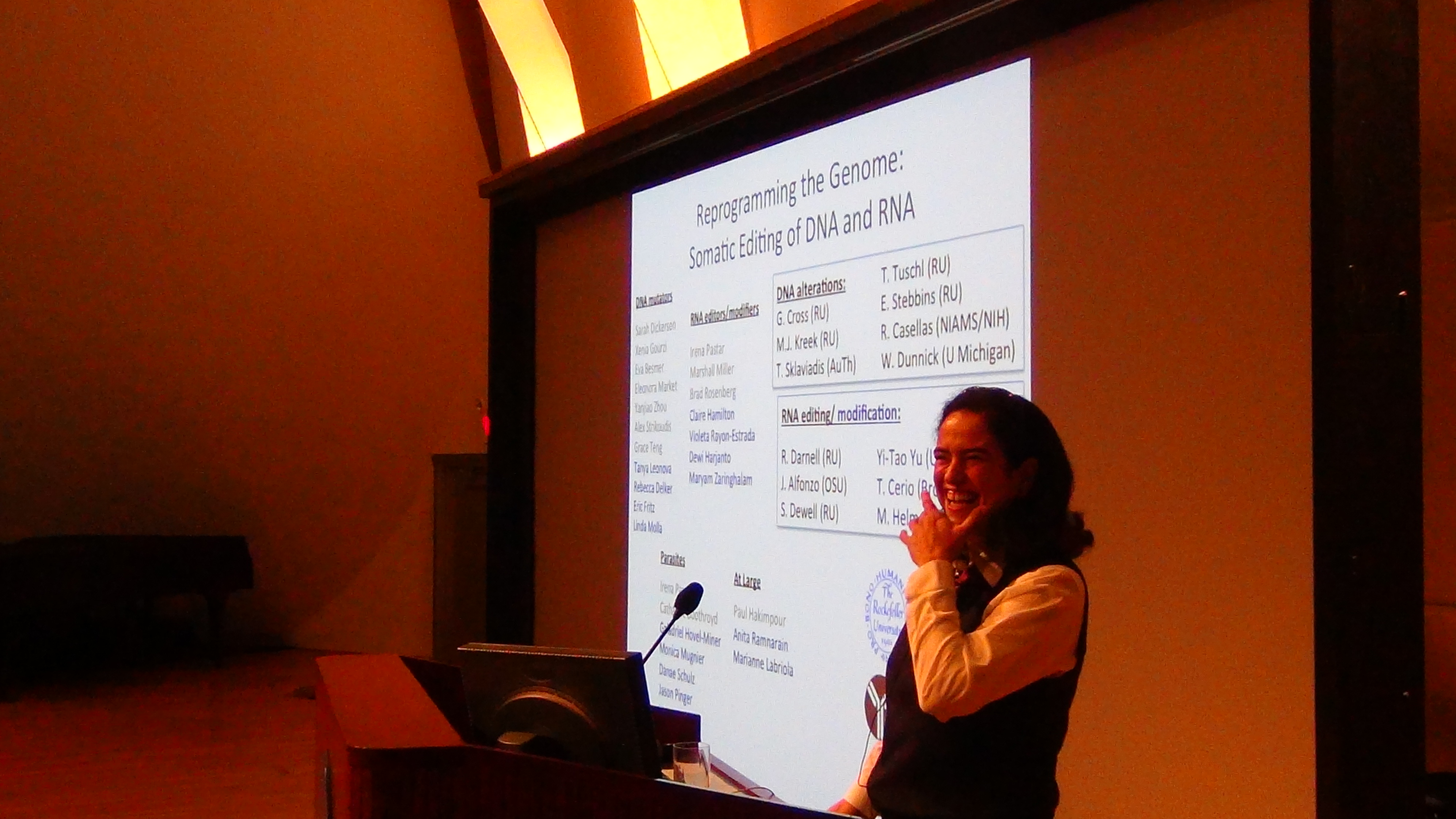
- Education: Rockefeller University Oberlin College
- Awards: Searle Scholar, NIH Director's Transformative Research Project Award, ERC Consolidator Award
- Scientific career
- Fields: Immunology, Molecular Biology
- Workplaces: German Cancer Research Center, Rockefeller University, Yale University
- Doctoral advisor: Michel C. Nussenzweig

Nina Papavasiliou is an immunologist and Helmholtz Professor in the Division of Immune Diversity at the German Cancer Research Center in Heidelberg, Germany. She is also an adjunct professor at the Rockefeller University, where she was previously associate professor and head of the Laboratory of Lymphocyte Biology. She is best known for her work in the fields of DNA and RNA editing.

== Education and early career ==
Papavasiliou received her Bachelors of Science from Oberlin College in biology in 1992. She then completed her PhD at the Rockefeller University in Michel C. Nussenzweig's Laboratory of Molecular Immunology. There, she began studying how B cell antigen receptors—or antibodies anchored to the cell membrane—undergo mutation so they can specifically recognize a particular antigen and elicit an immune response. She followed that interest to the Yale School of Medicine, where she worked as a postdoctoral fellow in the lab of David G. Schatz.

== Research ==
Papavasiliou's research centers on demystifying how cells and organisms diversify and expand the information encoded in their genomes, both at the DNA and RNA level. She opened her Laboratory of Lymphocyte Biology at Rockefeller University in 2001 as an assistant professor. Much of her group's early work was done in the context of the adaptive immune response, which is able to combat a wide array of pathogens seeking to invade the host by rapidly generating novel antibodies that are able to specifically recognize a given invader. Her group has worked to characterize the activity of an enzyme known as activation-induced cytidine deaminase (AID). AID changes cytidine (C) residues to uracil (U) in DNA, which is recognized as DNA damage and repaired in such a way that introduces thymidine (T), effectively mutating Cs to Ts in DNA. The process is known as somatic hypermutation and is how B cells can rapidly introduce DNA mutations into receptors that recognize the invaders, known as antigens. Papavasiliou's lab has worked to understand how AID expression is regulated in the immune system and how AID targets certain genes for mutation.

Papavasiliou also studies RNA editing in the context of the innate immune response using next-generation sequencing and bioinformatics approaches to identify and characterize RNA editing targets. Her group first identified novel RNA editing targets of APOBEC1, which mutates a cytosine to a uracil in an RNA transcript, and was previously thought to only edit Apolipoprotein B (apoB) in the small intestine. Her group has since moved on to attempt to characterize the potential role APOBEC1-editing may be playing outside of its function with apoB.

Papavasiliou most recently branched out to studying mechanisms of antigenic variation—or how pathogens vary their surface proteins to escape the immune response—using Trypanosoma brucei, the parasite that causes African sleeping sickness, as a model organism. Her group has developed new tools to better understand the dynamics of protein coat switching in trypanosomes, and is working to better understand the mechanisms by which trypanosomes are able to diversify their coat proteins over the course of an infection.

In 2016, Papavasiliou moved to the German Cancer Research Center to begin her lab in the Division of Immune Diversity with additional support from a European Research Council Consolidator Grant.

== Award & honors ==
- Keck Fellow, 2002
- Searle Scholar, 2003
- Sinsheimer Fund Scholar, 2005
- Thorbecke Award, Society for Leukocyte Biology, 2006
- The Vilcek Foundation Prize Finalist for Creative Promise in Biomedical Science, 2009
- National Institutes of Health Director’s Transformative Research Project Award, 2011
