= Eileen Furlong =

Irish molecular biologist

Eileen Furlong FRS MAE MRIA
- Born: Eileen E.M. Furlong
- Education: University College Dublin (BSc, PhD)
- Awards: Member of the Academia Europaea (2016); EMBO Membership (2013)
- Scientific career
- Fields: Enhancers; Chromatin topology Embryonic development Single cell genomics Transcription factors
- Workplaces: European Molecular Biology Laboratory; Stanford University
- Thesis: Tissue-specific regulation of gene expression by the transcription factors Ying-Yang 1 and nuclear factor 1 (1996)
- Doctoral advisor: Finian Martin
- Website: furlonglab.embl.de

Eileen E. M. Furlong FRS MAE is an Irish molecular biologist working in the fields of transcription, chromatin biology, developmental biology and genomics. She is known for her work in understanding how the genome is regulated, in particular to how developmental enhancers function, how they interact within three dimensional chromatin topologies and how they drive cell fate decisions during embryogenesis. She is Head of the Department of Genome Biology at the European Molecular Biology Laboratory (EMBL). Furlong was elected a member of the European Molecular Biology Organization (EMBO) in 2013, the Academia Europaea in 2016 and was appointed to EMBO’s research council in 2018.

== Education ==
Eileen Furlong obtained a Bachelor of Science degree at University College Dublin, and a PhD at the Conway institute at UCD, studying transcriptional regulation of immediate early response genes in the lab of Finian Martin.

== Career and research ==
After her PhD, Furlong was a postdoctoral researcher at Stanford University, in Matthew P. Scott's lab, developing genomics tools to functionally dissect developmental programmes during embryogenesis. Furlong started her independent lab at EMBL in 2002, and was appointed head of department in 2009. Her research integrates genomics, genetics and computational biology approaches to functionally dissect the role of non-coding cis-regulatory elements in the regulation of gene expression. In particular, using mesoderm specification into different muscle primordia as a model system. Her group’s research has uncovered a number of properties of enhancers and enhancer-promoter communication, including pre-formed enhancer-promoter ‘loops’ and the ability of many enhancer’s to function even when larger chromatin topologies are perturbed, in addition to mechanisms that allow enhancers to withstand the effects of genetic variation, including collective transcription factor recruitment, genetic epistasis within enhancers and promoters, and extensive redundancy, which together contribute to canalization in developmental patterning.

Furlong’s work was credited in the development and application of genomic approaches to understand embryonic development, including the development of Drosophila microarrays, an automatic transgenic embryo sorter, Chromatin immunoprecipitation (ChIP) in embryos, tissue specific and single cell approaches - which combined with genetic manipulations provided insight into developmental programmes during embryogenesis at a genome-wide scale.

Furlong serves on the editorial boards of the scientific journals Developmental Cell, Development, Molecular Systems Biology, Current Opinion in Genetics Development, Current Opinion in Cell Biology, a European Research Council (ERC) panel member and an organiser of the international Conferences From Functional Genomics to Systems Biology, EMBL Transcription and Chromatin meeting, and a keynote speaker at national and international conferences including Intelligent Systems for Molecular Biology (ISMB).

=== Awards and honors ===
Furlong was elected a member of the European Molecular Biology Organization (EMBO) in 2013, and a Member of the Academia Europaea (MAE) in 2016. Furlong was awarded ERC advanced investigator funding CisRegVar 2013-2018 and DeCRypT 2019-2023. She was elected a Fellow of the Royal Society in May 2022. In 2026, she was made a member of the Royal Irish Academy.
