= Suresh Subramani =

Indian biologist

- Born: India
- Education: IIT Kanpur, UC Berkeley
- Known for: Peroxisomes, autophagy
- Awards: Guggenheim Fellowship, Searle Scholar Award, Jane Coffin Childs Fellow, NIH MERIT Award
- Scientific career
- Fields: Molecular Biology, cell biology
- Workplaces: University of California, San Diego
- Doctoral advisor: Howard Schachman
- Other academic advisors: Paul Berg

Dr. Suresh Subramani is the Global Director of the Tata Institute for Genetics & Society, former Executive Vice Chancellor for Academic Affairs (2010 - 2016), and a Distinguished Professor of Molecular Biology at the University of California, San Diego. A distinguished cell and molecular biologist, Dr. Subramani has been a member of the UC San Diego faculty since 1982.

== Academic history ==
Suresh Subramani received his Ph.D. in Biochemistry from UC Berkeley, working with Dr. Howard Schachman. He was a Jane Coffin Childs Fellow with Dr. Paul Berg at Stanford University. He was the recipient of a Searle Scholar Award, an NCI Research Career Development Award, and a Guggenheim Fellowship. He is a Fellow of the American Academy of Microbiology and the recipient of an NIH MERIT Award.

His recent service to UCSD includes his role as the Executive Vice Chancellor (2010–16), Associate Vice Chancellor (2009–10), Interim Dean (2006–07) and Chair (1999-2000) of the UCSD Division of Biology. He is currently a Distinguished Professor (Emeritus), the Global Director of the Tata Institute for Genetics and Society (TIGS at UCSD and at inStem in Bangalore, India) and holds the Tata Chancellor's Endowed Professorship in Molecular Biology at UC San Diego.

== Publications ==
Subramani is an author or co-author of over 200 research articles in international journals, and is cited by the ISI Highly Cited database as one of the preeminent and most commonly cited researchers in the field of Molecular Biology and Genetics.

== Education ==
- Fergusson College, Pune, India (B.Sc. in chemistry)
- Indian Institute of Technology Kanpur (M.Sc. in chemistry)
- University of California Berkeley (PhD in biochemistry)
