= Pehr Harbury =

American biochemist (born 1965)

Pehr A. B. Harbury
- Born: 1965 (age 60–61)
- Education: Harvard University, Harvard Medical School
- Awards: MacArthur Fellows Program (2005)
- Scientific career
- Fields: Biochemistry
- Workplaces: Stanford University

Pehr A. B. Harbury (born 1965) is an American biochemist, and associate professor of biochemistry at Stanford University.

He is a native of Menlo Park. He graduated from Harvard University with a BA, and from Harvard Medical School, with a Ph.D. in Biological Chemistry in 1994.

== Awards ==
- 2005 MacArthur Fellows Program
- 2005 Director's Pioneer Award, NIH
- 2000 Young Investigator in the Pharmacological Sciences, Burroughs Wellcome Fund
- 1999 Searle Scholar, Chicago Community Trust
- 1999 MIT Technology Review TR100, as one of the top 100 innovators in the world under the age of 35
