= Matthew P. Scott =

American biologist

Matt Scott
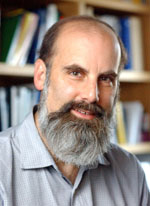
- Citizenship: United States
- Education: Massachusetts Institute of Technology (BS, PhD)
- Known for: Homeobox
- Spouse: Margaret T. Fuller
- Awards: Member of the National Academy of Sciences (1999)
- Scientific career
- Fields: Developmental biology
- Workplaces: Stanford University; Carnegie Institution for Science; University of Colorado Boulder; Indiana University
- Doctoral advisor: Mary Lou Pardue
- Notable students: Sean B. Carroll; Chris Q. Doe; Eileen Furlong (postdoc)
- Website: profiles.stanford.edu/matthew-scott

Matthew Peter Scott is an American biologist who was the tenth president of the Carnegie Institution for Science. While at Stanford University, Scott studied how embryonic and later development is governed by proteins that control gene activity and cell signaling processes. He co-discovered homeobox genes in Drosophila melanogaster working with Amy J. Weiner at Indiana University.

Among his laboratory's discoveries, he is recognized for the cloning of the patched gene family and demonstration that a human homolog PTCH1 is a key tumor suppressor gene for the Hedgehog signaling pathway as well as the causative gene for the nevoid basal cell carcinoma syndrome, or Gorlin syndrome.

== Education ==
Scott completed a B.S. in 1975 and Ph.D. in biology in 1980, both at Massachusetts Institute of Technology.

== Career and research ==
Scott served on the faculty of the Department of Molecular, Cellular, and Developmental Biology at the University of Colorado starting in 1983. He moved to Stanford University in 1990 to join the faculty of the Department of Developmental Biology and the Department of Genetics. From 2002-2007 he served as Chair of Bio-X, Stanford's interdisciplinary biosciences program.

=== Awards and honors ===
- 1983 - Helen Hay Whitney postdoctoral fellowship
- 1985 - Searle Scholar
- 2004 - Conklin Medal, Society for Developmental Biology
- 1999 - Member, United States National Academy of Sciences
- 2007 - Member, National Institute of Medicine

== Personal life ==
He is married to Stanford developmental geneticist Margaret T. Fuller.
