= Alex Kolodkin =

American neuroscientist

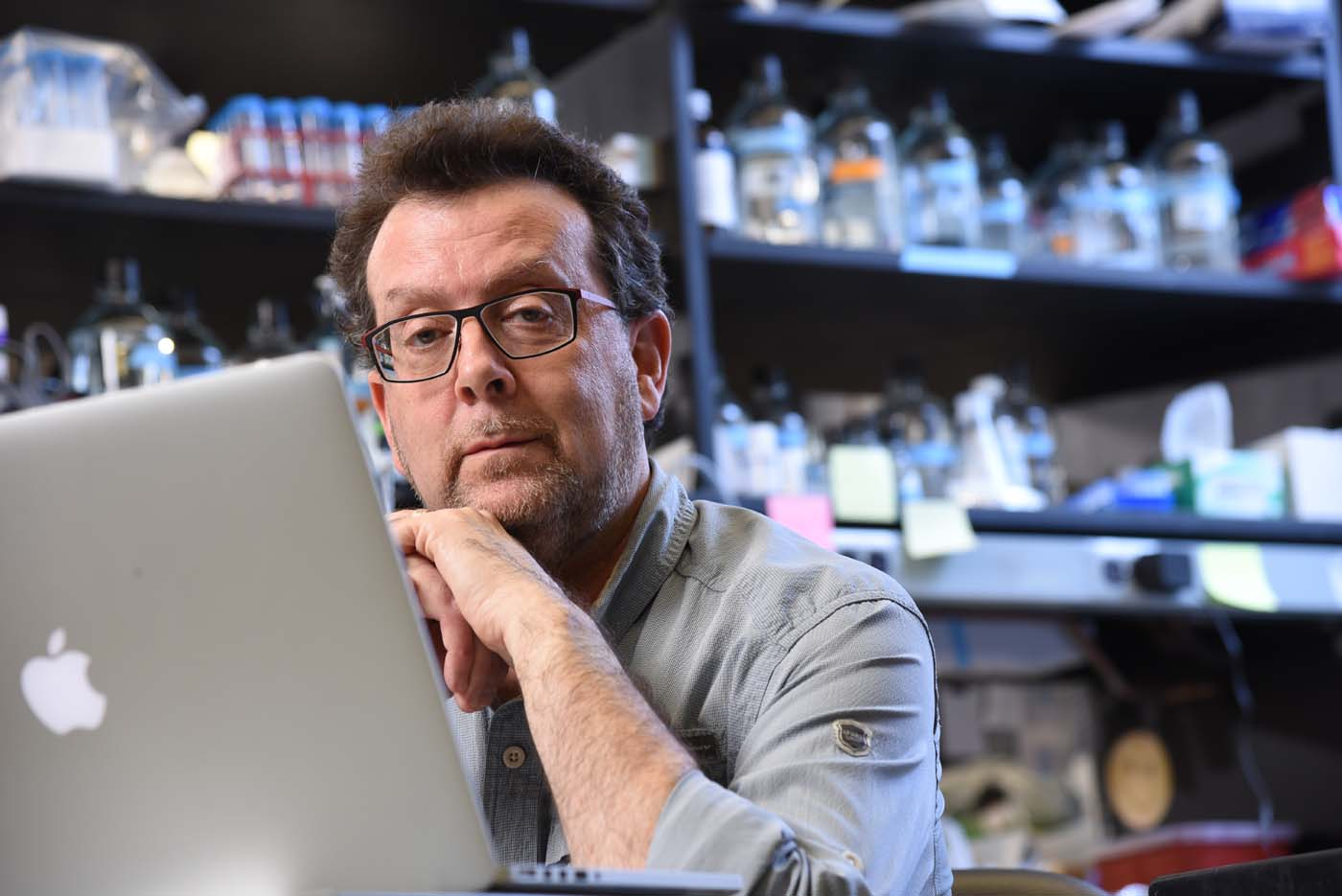
- Spouse: Maria Rodriguez (m. 1986)

Academic background
- Education: BA, 1980, Wesleyan University; PhD, molecular biology, University of Oregon
- Thesis: Double strand breaks can initiate meiotic recombination in Saccharomyces cerevisiae (1987)

Academic work
- Institutions: Johns Hopkins University School of Medicine

Alex Leo Kolodkin is an American neuroscientist. He is the Charles J. Homcy and Simeon G. Margolis Professor in the Department of Neuroscience at the Johns Hopkins University School of Medicine. He is an elected member of the National Academy of Sciences and the National Academy of Medicine.

He is known for his work on neuronal guidance cues and their receptors, the discovery of semaphorins, and unveiling guidance cue roles in neural circuit assembly and function in insects and mammals. Kolodkin’s work provides a framework for understanding how a limited number of guidance molecules are capable of sculpting, maintaining, and refining complex neural circuitry.

== Early life and education ==
Kolodkin was born to Milton and Barbara Kolodkin. He graduated from Mount Greylock Regional School in 1975 and received a Bachelor of Arts degree from Wesleyan University in 1980. Upon graduating, he received the Griffen Prize for excellence in religious studies. After marrying Maria Rodriguez in 1986, Kolodkin graduated from the University of Oregon with a doctor of philosophy degree in molecular biology. As a postdoctoral fellow, Kolodkin discovered and cloned the first semaphorin gene, revealing a family of proteins that include members that provide directional guidance to extending axons and dendrites

== Career ==
Following his post-doctoral fellowship at the University of California, Berkeley, Kolodkin joined the faculty at Johns Hopkins University School of Medicine in 1995. As an assistant professor in the department of neuroscience, Kolodkin's laboratory focused on the understanding of how nervous system connectivity develops in both vertebrates and invertebrates. Upon joining the faculty, he collaborated with David Ginty, then an assistant professor in the Neuroscience Department, to study semaphorin receptors. In 1996, Kolodkin received a Searle Scholars Program Award to study Molecular Mechanisms of Growth Cone Guidance. He was also awarded the Whitehall Foundation Research Award, the Klingenstein Award, and McKnight Neuroscience Scholars Award. In 2000, Kolodkin received an Investigator Award from the McKnight Foundation.

Following his promotion to associate professor in the Department of Neuroscience, Kolodkin was one of three recipients of the 2002 Kirsch Investigator Award from the Steven Kirsch and Michele Kirsch Foundation. As a result of the award, he received funding for his research activities on the Mechanisms of Neuronal Guidance and Regeneration. In 2004, he was promoted to the rank of Full professor and received the Sen. Jacob Javits Award from the National Institute of Neurological Diseases and Strokes. The following year, based on Kolodkin’s research team’s work on neural circuit formation in fruit flies and mice, he was one of 43 scientists selected as Investigators by the Howard Hughes Medical Institute.

Prior to the 2016–17 academic year, Kolodkin was appointed the inaugural holder of the Charles J. Homcy and Simeon G. Margolis Endowed Professor of Neuroscience. He was also elected into the American Academy of Arts and Sciences for "identifying the first members of the semaphorin family and pioneering the identification of mechanisms by which semaphorins act to guide axon." In 2020, Kolodkin was elected a member of the National Academy of Medicine. In Spring 2022, Kolodkin was elected to the National Academy of Sciences for his research into neuronal connectivity during embryonic and postnatal development.
