= Karla Kirkegaard =

American geneticist and microbiologist (born 1954)

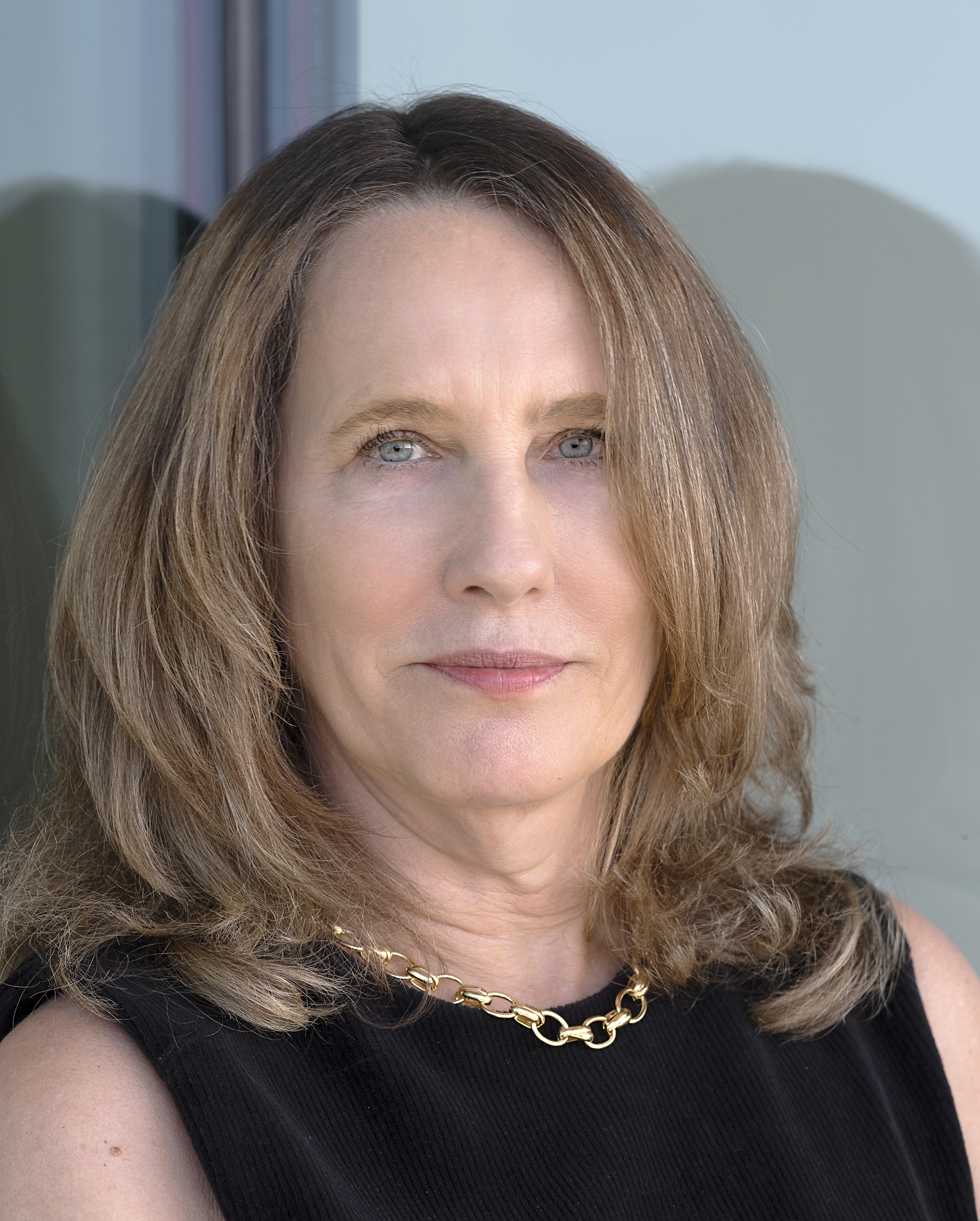
- Born: 1954 (age 71–72)
- Education: University of California Berkeley; Harvard University
- Spouse: Peter Sarnow
- Scientific career
- Fields: virology
- Workplaces: Whitehead Institute; University of Colorado Boulder; Stanford University School of Medicine

Karla Kirkegaard (born 1954) is the Violetta L. Horton Research Professor of genetics at the Stanford University School of Medicine. She was the chair of the Department of Microbiology and Immunology from 2006 to 2010. She is an elected member of the American Academy of Arts and Sciences and the National Academy of Sciences. Her research focuses on virology.

== Education ==
Kirkegaard received her bachelor's degree in genetics from the University of California Berkeley in 1976 and her PhD from Harvard University in biochemistry and molecular biology in 1983 the lab of James C. Wang. She then did postdoctoral research at the Whitehead Institute in the lab of David Baltimore.

== Career ==
She joined the faculty at the University of Colorado Boulder, before moving to the Stanford University School of Medicine in 1996. She was the chair of the Department of Microbiology and Immunology from 2006 to 2010.

She is an editor for the American Society for Microbiology's Journal of Virology. She was a Howard Hughes Medical Institute investigator and her work has been funded by the Michael J. Fox Foundation.

Her research focuses on the transmission of viruses and how viruses develop resistance to drugs.

== Awards ==
- 1987 Searle Scholar
- 1989 Packard Fellow
- 2006 NIH Director's Pioneer Award
- 2010 Elected fellow of the American Association for the Advancement of Science
- 2012 Elected fellow of the American Academy of Microbiology
- Elected fellow of the American Academy of Arts and Sciences
- 2019 Elected fellow of the National Academy of Sciences
