= Jean Baum =

American chemist

- Education: Barnard College (AB), University of California, Berkeley (PhD)
- Scientific career
- Doctoral advisor: Alexander Pines
- Website: https://rutchem.rutgers.edu/the-baum-group-home

Jean Baum is an American chemist. She is the distinguished professor of chemistry and chemical biology at Rutgers University, where she is also vice dean for research and graduate education in the school of arts and sciences, and also vice chair of the department of chemistry and chemical biology. Her research investigates protein–protein interaction and protein aggregation using nuclear magnetic resonance spectroscopy (NMR) and other biochemical and biophysical techniques. She serves as treasurer for the Protein Society.

== Education ==
Baum obtained her bachelor degree magna cum laude at Barnard College in 1980. She completed her PhD in physical chemistry with Alexander Pines at University of California, Berkeley from 1981-1986, working on solid-state NMR.

== Research and career ==
After completing her PhD, Baum changed her research focus towards biological applications of NMR, especially in solution-state. She worked with Chris Dobson at University of Oxford from 1986-1988, while holding a Fulford junior research fellowship at Somerville College. During this time, she used NMR to investigate partly folded and misfolded proteins. She joined Rutgers University in 1988 as a Henry Rutgers Research Fellow, and was promoted to distinguished professor in 2010.

Baum uses both solution- and solid-state NMR in her research. Her research investigates the structure and dynamics of proteins, including alpha-synuclein, which can aggregate to form amyloid fibrils, and collagen. The molecular interactions involved in the assembly of the functional and pathological forms of these proteins can be elucidated by NMR investigations. Since May 2020, her research has included studying the SARS-CoV-2 spike protein using a combined experimental and computational approach.

== Honors and awards ==
- Fulford Junior Research Fellow, University of Oxford, England, 1986-1988
- Henry Rutgers Research Fellow, 1988-1990
- Merck Faculty Development Award; 1988-1990
- Searle Scholar, 1990-1993
- Johnson and Johnson Discovery Research Fund, 1993
- Camille & Henry Dreyfus Teacher-Scholar Award, 1993-1998
- Margaret O. Dayhoff Biophysical Society Award, 1994
- Rutgers University Board of Trustees Scholarly Excellence Fellowship, 1994
- Alfred P. Sloan Fellow, 1994-1996
- Visiting fellow, Clare Hall, University of Cambridge, England, 2009
