= Michael Therien =

Michael J. Therien
- Education: University of St. Andrews (B.S.); University of California, San Diego (Ph.D)
- Known for: Physical chemistry Physical organic chemistry Physical inorganic chemistry
- Scientific career
- Fields: Chemistry
- Workplaces: Duke University; University of Pennsylvania
- Doctoral advisor: William C. Trogler
- Website: sites.duke.edu/therienlab/

Michael J. Therien is the William R. Kenan, Jr. Professor of Chemistry at Duke University.

== Career ==
Therien received his B.S. in Chemistry from University of St. Andrews in 1982. He began his studies in organometallic chemistry at University of California, San Diego, where he earned his Ph.D. in 1987 working with William C. Trogler. Upon completion of his Ph.D. in 1987, he was a National Institutes of Health Postdoctoral Fellow at the California Institute of Technology under Harry B. Gray. In 1990, he was appointed Assistant Professor of Chemistry at University of Pennsylvania, where he was promoted to Associate Professor in 1996, full Professor in 1997, and named Alan G. MacDiarmid Professor in 2002. In 2008 he was appointed William R. Kenan, Jr. Professor of Chemistry at Duke University, the position he currently holds.

== Current research ==
The Therien laboratory designs and characterizes supermolecular structures, bioinspired assemblies, and nanoscale materials that possess exceptional optical, electronic, and excited-state dynamical properties. His laboratory pioneered new approaches to engineer electro-optic function important for light harvesting, long-wavelength emission, imaging, frequency doubling, and photon upconversion. Other accomplishments include: defining molecular wires that enable expansive charge delocalization; developing carbon nanotube superstructures that facilitate energy conversion; and illuminating biologically important mechanistic insights critical for generating high-energy photoproducts.

== Major publications ==
(Publications listed below have been cited more than 200 times)

- Migliore, A; Polizzi, NF; Therien, MJ; Beratan, DN (2014). "Biochemistry and theory of proton-coupled electron transfer". Chem. Rev. 114 (7): 3381–3465. doi:10.1021/cr4006654. PMC 4317057. PMID 24684625.
- Levine, DH; Ghoroghchian, PP; Freudenberg, J; Zhang, G; Therien, MJ; Greene, MI; Hammer, DA; Ramachandran, M (2008). "Polymersomes: a new multi-functional tool for cancer diagnosis and therapy". Methods. 46 (1): 25–32. doi:10.1016/j.ymeth.2008.05.006. PMC 2714227. PMID 18572025.
- Ghoroghchian, PP; Li, G; Levine, DH; Davis, KP; Bates, FS; Hammer, DA; Therien, MJ (2006). "Bioresorbable Vesicles Formed through Spontaneous Self-Assembly of Amphiphilic Poly(ethylene oxide)-block-polycaprolactone". Macromolecules. 39 (5): 1673–1675. Bibcode:2006MaMol..39.1673G. doi:10.1021/ma0519009. PMC 2958688. PMID 20975926.
- Strachan, DR; Smith, DE; Johnston, DE; Park, TH; Therien, MJ; Bonnell, DA; Johnson, AT (2005). "Controlled fabrication of nanogaps in ambient environment for molecular electronics". Applied Physics Letters. 86 (4): 043109. arXiv:cond-mat/0504112. Bibcode:2005ApPhL..86d3109S. doi:10.1063/1.1857095. S2CID 118911866.
- Ghoroghchian, PP; Frail, PR; Susumu, K; Blessington, D; Brannan, AK; Bates, FS; Chance, B; Hammer, DA; Therien, MJ (2005). "Near-infrared-emissive polymersomes: Self-assembled soft matter for in vivo optical imaging". Proceedings of the National Academy of Sciences. 102 (8): 2922–2927. Bibcode:2005PNAS..102.2922G. doi:10.1073/pnas.0409394102. PMC 549472. PMID 15708979.
- Zhang, TG; Zhao, Y; Asselberghs, I; Persoons, A; Therien, MJ (2005). "Design, Synthesis, Linear, and Nonlinear Optical Properties of Conjugated (Porphinato)zinc(II)-Based Donor−Acceptor Chromophores Featuring Nitrothiophenyl and Nitrooligothiophenyl Electron-Accepting Moieties". J. Am. Chem. Soc. 127 (27): 9710–9720. Bibcode:2005JAChS.127.9710Z. doi:10.1021/ja0402553. PMID 15998075.
- Kumble, R; Palese, S; Lin, VSY; Therien, MJ; Hochstrasser, RM (1998). "Ultrafast Dynamics of Highly Conjugated Porphyrin Arrays". J. Am. Chem. Soc. 120 (44): 11489–11498. Bibcode:1998JAChS.12011489K. doi:10.1021/ja981811u.
- Hyslop, AG; Kellett, MA; Iovine, PM; Therien, MJ (1998). "Suzuki Porphyrins: New Synthons for the Fabrication of Porphyrin-Containing Supramolecular Assemblies". J. Am. Chem. Soc. 120 (48): 12676–12677. Bibcode:1998JAChS.12012676H. doi:10.1021/ja982410h.
- Priyadarshy, S; Therien, MJ; Beratan, DN (1996). "Acetylenyl-Linked, Porphyrin-Bridged, Donor−Acceptor Molecules: A Theoretical Analysis of the Molecular First Hyperpolarizability in Highly Conjugated Push−Pull Chromophore Structures". Journal of the American Chemical Society. 118 (6): 1504–1510. Bibcode:1996JAChS.118.1504P. doi:10.1021/ja952690q.
- LeCours, SM; Guan, H-W; DiMagno, SG; Wang, CH; Therien, MJ (1996). "Push−Pull Arylethynyl Porphyrins: New Chromophores That Exhibit Large Molecular First-Order Hyperpolarizabilities". Journal of the American Chemical Society. 118 (6): 1497–1503. Bibcode:1996JAChS.118.1497L. doi:10.1021/ja953610l.
- De Rege, PJ; Williams, SA; Therien, MJ (1995). "Direct evaluation of electronic coupling mediated by hydrogen bonds: implications for biological electron transfer". Science. 269 (5229): 1409–1413. Bibcode:1995Sci...269.1409D. doi:10.1126/science.7660123. PMID 7660123. S2CID 19939105.
- Lin, VS; Therien, MJ (1995). "The Role of Porphyrin-to-Porphyrin Linkage Topology in the Extensive Modulation of the Absorptive and Emissive Properties of a Series of Ethynyl- and Butadiynyl-Bridged Bis- and Tris(porphinato)zinc Chromophores". Chemistry – A European Journal. 1 (9): 645–651. doi:10.1002/chem.19950010913.
- Lin, VS; DiMagno, SG; Therien, MJ (1994). "Highly conjugated, acetylenyl bridged porphyrins: new models for light-harvesting antenna systems". Science. 264 (5162): 1105–1111. Bibcode:1994Sci...264.1105L. doi:10.1126/science.8178169. PMID 8178169.
- DiMagno, SG; Lin, VS; Therien, MJ (1993). "Facile elaboration of porphyrins via metal-mediated cross-coupling". Journal of Organic Chemistry. 58 (22): 2983–5993. doi:10.1021/jo00074a027.

== Awards and honors ==
Fellow, John Simon Guggenheim Memorial Foundation, 2020
Fellow, Royal Flemish Academy of Belgium for Science and the Arts, 2009
International Francqui Chair, 2008
Fellow, American Association for the Advancement of Science, 2005
Philadelphia Section Award, American Chemical Society, 2004
Young Investigator Award, Society of Porphyrins & Phthalocyanines, 2002
Fellow, Alfred P. Sloan Foundation, 1995
NSF National Young Investigator, 1993-98
Young Investigator Award, Arnold and Mabel Beckman Foundation, 1992-1994
Searle Scholar, 1991>
