= Hazel Sive =

American South-African-born Biologist & scholar

Hazel Louise Sive
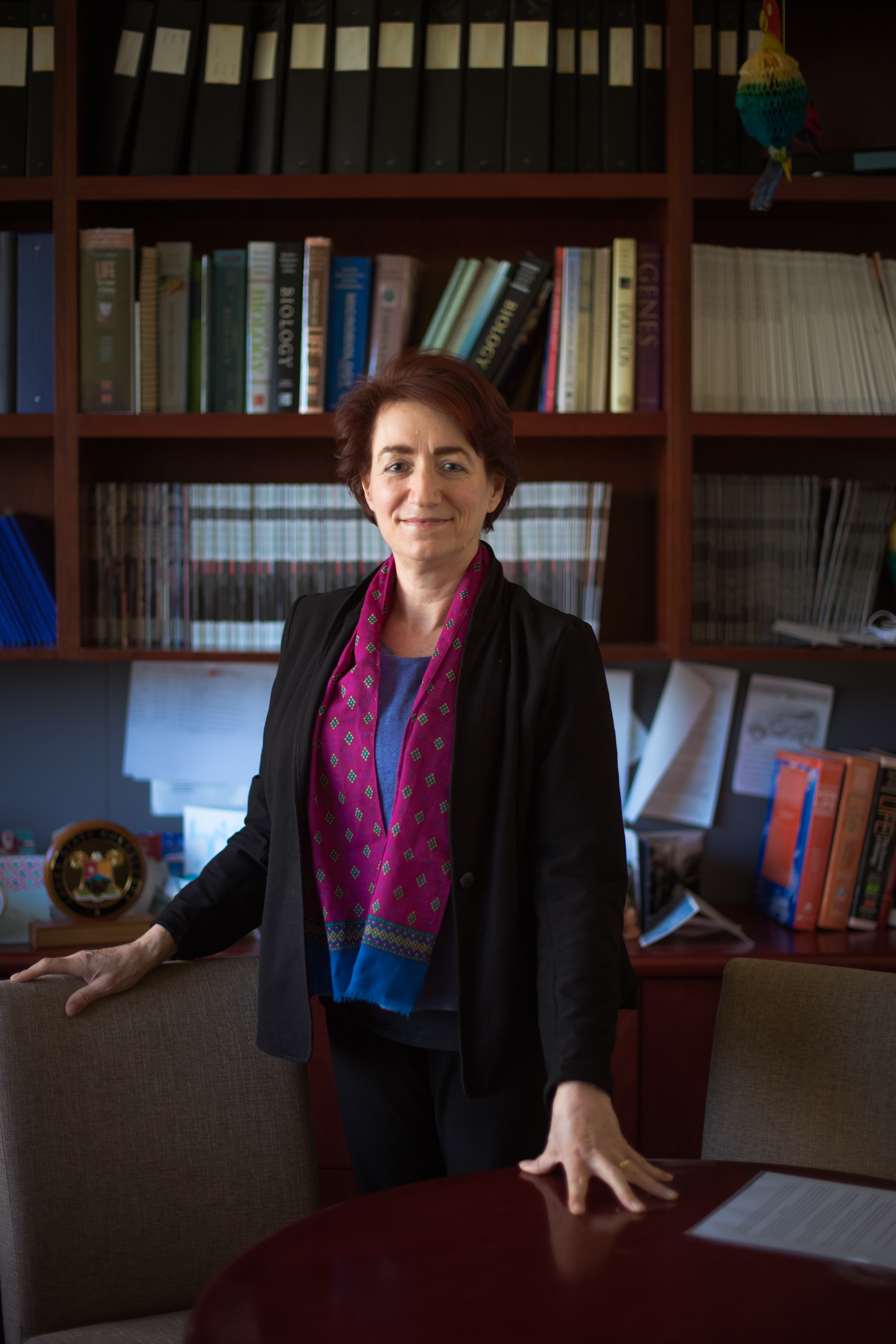
- Hazel Sive in 2017
- Education: University of the Witwatersrand (BA); Rockefeller University (PhD)
- Awards: MacVicar Faculty Fellow, MIT (2015); National Science Foundation Young Investigator Award (1992); Searle Scholar Award (1992)
- Scientific career
- Workplaces: Whitehead Institute; Massachusetts Institute of Technology (MIT); Broad Institute; Northeastern University

Hazel L. Sive is a South African scientist. She currently serves as Dean of the College of Science and Mathematics at the University of Massachusetts. Sive's research includes studies of neurological and neurodevelopmental disorders, such as epilepsy, autism, and 16p11.2 deletion syndrome.

== Education ==
Sive received her Bachelor of Science with honors in 1979 from the University of the Witwatersrand in Johannesburg, South Africa with a double major in zoology and chemistry.

== Research ==
Sive's research includes analysis of the extreme anterior domain (EAD), a region found in developing embryos that develops into the mouth opening and oral cavity. This research defined key steps of mouth formation and determined that the EAD is a facial signaling center that guides neural crest cells into the developing face, where they form the jaws and other structures.

Sive has conducted research into nervous system patterning. She was involved in the development of subtractive cloning techniques used to define nervous system molecular markers and regulators in Xenopus frogs and the zebrafish Danio. Expression of these genes determine the point at which an embryo begins to develop a nervous system: Sive determined that future brain cells are set aside when the embryo is just a ball of cells. Sive was the first to use hormone-inducible fusion proteins to study these genes.

Sive developed the first zebrafish 'explant' culture method, and identified cell interactions that initiate brain development. Sive identified retinoic acid as a regulator of brain patterning, and demonstrated its activity on expression of hindbrain Hox genes. She defined additional roles for fibroblast growth factors in precise patterning of the hindbrain.

Sive was instrumental in the identification of "basal constriction" as a cell-shape-change occurring during brain morphogenesis. They identified the process of "epithelial relaxation," a cell-sheet-stretching process that occurs as brain ventricles form. She was one of the first to use zebrafish to study the brain ventricular system: cavities filled with cerebrospinal fluid (CSF) that form the body's "third circulation." This research identified Retinol Binding Protein in the CSF as essential for the survival of brain cells.

Sive investigated zebrafish as a tool for probing gene function associated with autism spectrum disorders. Her group has identified genes that interact and contribute to brain dysfunction in the prevalent and serious 16p11.2 deletion syndrome, implicating lipid metabolism in symptomatology.

Sive is the editor of Xenopus: A Laboratory Manual.

== Academic roles and awards ==
In 2015, she was named a MacVicar Faculty Fellow, MIT's highest award for undergraduate teaching.

She received the MIT School of Science Teaching Award (2003), MIT's Alan J. Lazarus Advising Award in 2016, and the MIS School of Science Teaching Award for Undergraduate Education in 2019. Several of her courses are offered through the MIT OpenCourseWare online initiative.

Sive was chair of the MIT Biology Undergraduate Program (2003–2006) and served as the first Associate Dean for the MIT School of Science (2006–2013).

Sive has served as chair of the MIT Committee on Student Life and as founding chair of the MIT Faculty Postdoctoral Advisory Committee.

In 2014, Sive founded and is Director of the MIT-Africa initiative, leading the Africa Advisory Committee to write a Strategic Plan for MIT Engagement in Africa.

In 2017, Sive was named Director of Higher Education at the MIT Jameel World Education Lab (J-WEL).

She was formerly a Member of the Whitehead Institute and joined the MIT faculty in 1991.

In November 2021, she was elected as an AAAS Fellow. Sive received the recognition for fundamental discoveries advancing our understanding of early embryonic development, particularly the development of the nervous system in vertebrates, and for her leadership in teaching, mentoring, and diversity in higher education.

In 2022, Sive was awarded an honorary doctorate in engineering from her alma mater, the University of the Witwatersrand.
