= Judith S. Eisen =

American neuroscientist

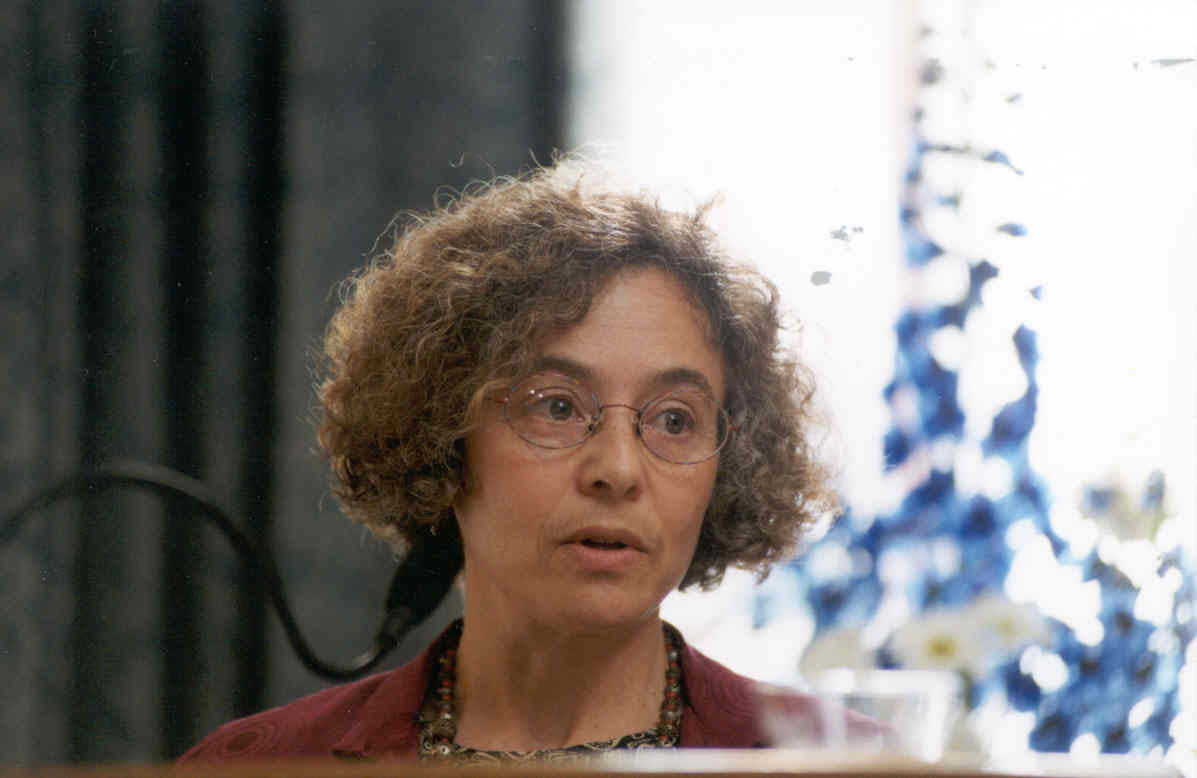
- Judith Eisen at ΠΒΚ Initiation June 2001
- Born: 1951 (age 74–75)
- Education: Brandeis University
- Known for: zebrafish, microbiome and bacterial pathogenesis
- Awards: Guggenheim Fellow (2010); Fellow of the American Association for the Advancement of Science (2017); Fellow of the American Academy of Arts & Sciences (2018); Member of the National Academy of Sciences (2024)
- Scientific career
- Fields: Neuroscience
- Workplaces: University of Oregon
- Doctoral advisor: Eve Marder
- Website: ion.uoregon.edu/content/judith-eisen

Judith S. Eisen is an American neuroscientist and professor of biology at the University of Oregon. Eisen conducts fundamental research in the specification and patterning of the vertebrate nervous system with a focus on developmental interactions between the nervous system, immune system, and host-associated microbiota. Eisen is a member of the Institute of Neuroscience at the University of Oregon.

== Education and career ==
Eisen received a BS in botany in 1973 and an MS in Cell and Developmental Biology in 1977, both from Utah State University. She received her PhD in neurobiology from Brandeis University in 1982, where she worked in the lab of Eve Marder. She was a postdoctoral fellow in neurobiology at Brandeis from 1982–1983.

Eisen started her career at the University of Oregon in 1983 as a postdoctoral fellow in the lab of Monte Westerfield. She joined the faculty in 1985 as an assistant professor and currently holds the position of professor in the Department of Biology, also serving as a member of the Institute of Neuroscience.

Eisen and her lab are interested in how cells become committed to differentiate and develop their specific properties during embryonic development. They have focused their attention on neurons and neural crest cells in embryonic zebrafish. Eisen was the first person to describe individually identified vertebrate spinal motoneurons. More recently she demonstrated requirements for the enteric nervous system to regulate bacterial competition and composition within the intestinal microbiota and how changes in the microbiota positively and negatively impact intestinal health. Eisen has published over 150 scientific papers with over 8800 citations, according to ResearchGate. Her lifetime research is profiled in the article Zebrafish Reveal How Bioelectricity Shapes Muscle Development which was published shortly after her election to the National Academy of Sciences in 2024.

She served as director of the Institute of Neuroscience from 2004 to 2007. In 2004, she joined the editorial team of the journal Development for advances in developmental biology and stem cells as the 'zebrafish' editor. Shes has served on the editorial boards of Neural Development (2006–2019) and Zebrafish (2008–present). She was an editor of the volume The zebrafish in biomedical research: biology, husbandry, diseases, and research applications.

== Honors and awards ==
- 1983–1985 Muscular Dystrophy Association Postdoctoral Fellowship
- 1986–1989 Searle Scholar
- 1991–1995 National Science Foundation Presidential Young Investigator Award
- 1991–1995 National Institutes of Health Research Career Development Award
- 1996–1997 Burroughs Wellcome Travel Fellowship
- 1996–1997 Fogarty Senior International Fellowship
- 1997–1998 National Institutes of Health Senior Fellowship
- 2008–2010 Foundation Faculty Excellence Fellowship
- 2010–2011 John Simon Guggenheim Memorial Foundation Fellowship
- 2015 Association for the Study of Food and Society 2015 Pedagogy Award for "Bread 101"
- 2015 University of Oregon Thomas F. Herman excellence in pedagogy award
- 2015 Medical Research Foundation of Oregon's Discovery Award
- 2017– Rowland Distinguished Visiting Scholar at Harvard University
- 2017– Fellow, American Association for the Advancement of Science
- 2018– Fellow, American Academy of Arts and Sciences
- 2018 University of Oregon Center for Undergraduate Research and Engagement Inaugural Faculty Research Mentor Award
- 2018 University of Oregon Outstanding Career Award
- 2018–2019 University of Oregon Faculty Excellence Award
- 2020–2024 Gordon and Betty Moore Symbiosis in Aquatic Systems Investigator
- 2020–2021 University of Oregon Wayne Morse Center for Law and Politics Distinguished Scholar
- 2024 Elected as a member of the National Academy of Sciences
