= Renee Reijo Pera =

Stem cell biologist

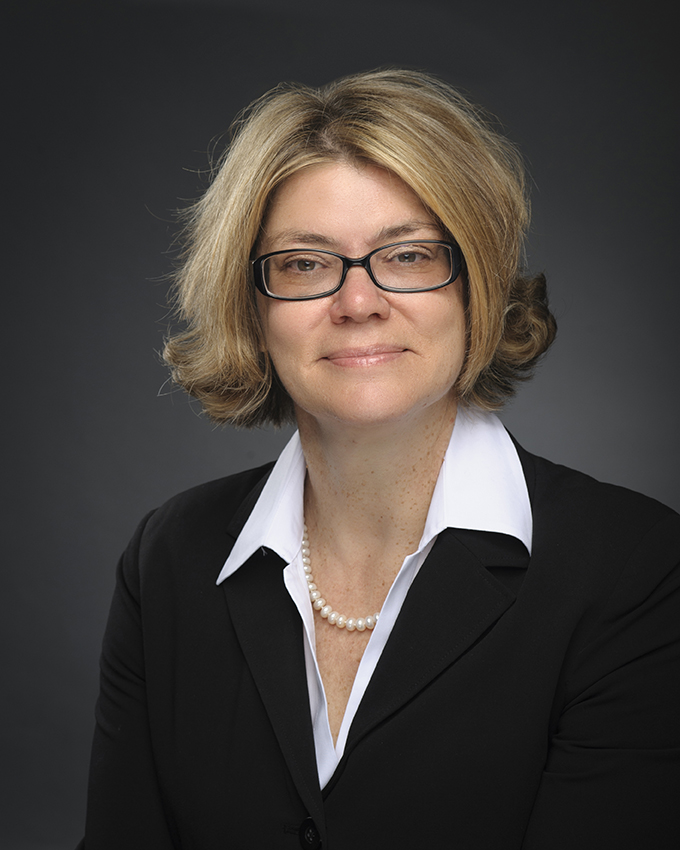
- Born: United States
- Education: University of Wisconsin–Superior, BS, 1983 Kansas State University, MS, 1987 Cornell University, PhD, 1993
- Known for: Human reproductive biologist
- Spouse: Fred Pera
- Scientific career
- Fields: Stem Cell Biology
- Workplaces: California Polytechnic State University (current); Montana State University; Stanford University; University of California, San Francisco; Whitehead Institute

Renee Reijo Pera is a stem cell biologist and the President of the McLaughlin Research Institute in Great Falls, MT. She previously served as Vice President of Research and Economic Development, for more than 8 years at the California Polytechnic State University and at Montana State University. Reijo Pera's research focuses on human development and disease, in particular, on the development and differentiation of somatic and germ cell lineages and neurodegenerative diseases such as Parkinson's disease and also infertility in men and women.

== Education and early career ==
Reijo Pera grew up in Iron River, Wisconsin as the youngest of six children. She initially enrolled in University of Wisconsin–Superior as a business major, but switched her interests during her junior year after taking a class on human genetics for non-majors. She changed her major to biology and received her bachelor's degree in 1983, becoming the first in her family to finish a four-year degree.

She then attended Kansas State University to work as a research technician, and ultimately received her master's degree in entomology. She next attended Cornell University, where she received her doctorate in biochemistry in 1993, working in the laboratory of Tim Huffaker. There, her research centered on studying mitotic and meiotic mutants in the yeast Saccharomyces cerevisiae.

In 1993, Reijo Pera became a postdoctoral researcher at the Whitehead Institute, which is affiliated with the Massachusetts Institute of Technology. There, she worked in the laboratory of David C. Page, where she worked to map genes linked to male infertility on the Y chromosome, including those that result in a total loss of sperm.

== Research career ==
=== Career trajectory and leadership ===
In 1997, Reijo Pera became an assistant professor at the University of California, San Francisco and in 2003 became the co-director of the UCSF Human Development Center after receiving a promotion to Associate Professor. In 2007, she moved her laboratory to Stanford University, where she was a Professor. She later became the director of Stanford's Center for Human Stem Cell Research and Education, as well as the Center for Reproductive and Stem Cell Biology and served as the George D. Smith endowed Professor.

In 2014, she became the Vice President of Research and Economic Development at Montana State University, seeking to have a larger impact on science education in the public university arena. During her tenure, she helped to grow the university's total research expenditures to a record of $131 million and increased the number of funded student projects by over 20 percent. In 2019, she moved again to California Polytechnic State University to serve as the Vice President of Research and Economic Development.

=== Research interests ===
Reijo Pera has cited her experience of developing a rare kind of ovarian cancer, called a granulosa cell tumour, early in her career as a motivating factor for her decision to study human development and fertility. The cancer resulted in her own loss of fertility.

In men, her research team and collaborators have investigated mechanisms of male infertility. In a study published in 2000, she found that some infertile men have mutations in the genes required for DNA repair, which in turn may lead to defects in meiotic cell division—also known as meiotic arrest—and inviable sperm. Her research group has also worked on developing alternative solutions for men experiencing infertility through an understanding of how immature sperm cells form. Her research has documented how immature sperm cells can be differentiated from stem cells derived from skin cells (fibroblasts) with the hope of ultimately using the knowledge obtained to assist infertile men with maturation of endogenous cells. Her team extracted skin cells from infertile men and induced them to become induced pluripotent stem cells, which can subsequently be used to study many different cell types of the body and many different diseases. Although studies such as these can stir up some controversy, leading to discussions around misuse of such a technology, the studies are primarily basic science studies and are intended to generate knowledge that can be used to help infertile men produce viable sperm cells of their own.

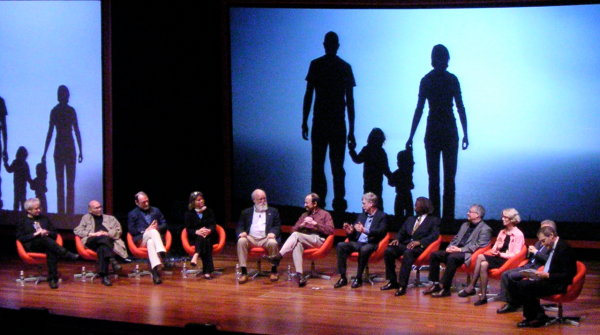
Panel discussion "What it Means to Be Human" at the 2008 World Science Festival. From left to right: Paul Nurse, Marvin Minsky, Ian Tattersall, Renee Reijo Pera, Daniel Dennett, Harold Varmus, Francis Collins, Jim Gates, Nikolas Rose, Patricia Churchland, Antonio Damasio, Charlie Rose

Reijo Pera has also worked to develop methods to improve the chances of pregnancy during in vitro fertilization by being able to identify and select healthy embryos for implantation. To do so, she and her team of collaborators essentially devised a method to film the embryos in the clinic using a microscope as it divides for the first time and then measure the differences between that process across embryos to score which are the most viable. Specifically, they score embryos based on the time it takes to complete the first three cell divisions (i.e. from one cell to 8). Her team was able to predict with 93% accuracy which embryos had the greatest chance of resulting in a successful pregnancy. This work was named a Top 10 Biomedical Breakthrough by Time in 2010.

More broadly, Reijo Pera has also worked to understand human disease, especially Parkinson's disease and how pluripotent embryonic stem cells are ultimately able to mature into their specialized adult forms. She and her collaborators decided to focus their attention on identifying certain developmental milestones that occur in an embryo one week after fertilization, measuring gene expression in individual cells. They identified genes that were derived from the human endogenous retrovirus K, which activate key genes during early development and confer the embryo with immunity against other viruses. They later found that the human endogenous retrovirus-H produced key RNA molecules that could either activate or silence genes, acting as "switches" for gene expression. Her team found that these switches could help maintain pluripotency.

=== Entrepreneurship ===
Reijo Pera has worked to bring her research from "bench to bedside", founding startups geared towards addressing infertility. In 2008, she was a cofounder of Auxogyn, Inc; in 2015, Auxogyn and Fertility Authorities merged to form Progyny, Inc. a start-up offering plans to large companies that would help their female employees cover the cost of fertility treatments; in 2018, the company was named a "Disruptor 50" by CNBC. Progyny went public on the NASDAQ in October 2019 with a market cap of $3.5–4B in 2022.

== Awards and honors ==
- Top 10 Biomedical Breakthroughs, Time, 2010
- Honorary Doctorate of Human Letters, University of Wisconsin–Superior, 2009
- Twenty Influential Women Leaders in the US, Newsweek, 2006
- Searle Scholars Program, 1998
