= Chris Q. Doe =

Professor of biology

- Born: 1958 (age 67–68)
- Education: Stanford University
- Awards: NIH MERIT award (2013) Presidential Young Investigator Award (1990)
- Scientific career
- Fields: Neuroscience Developmental biology
- Workplaces: University of Oregon
- Thesis: The role of cell interactions and cell lineage during insect neurogenesis (1987)
- Doctoral advisor: Corey Goodman
- Other academic advisors: Matthew P. Scott
- Website: www.doelab.org

Chris Q Doe (Born 1958) is a professor of Biology, and Howard Hughes Medical Institute investigator at the Institute for Neuroscience, University of Oregon, Eugene, Oregon, United States. Doe did his PhD work with Corey Goodman at Stanford University, followed by postdoctoral fellowship with Matthew P. Scott at University of Colorado Boulder. He is a researcher in developmental biology known for his studies on neurogenesis in Drosophila melanogaster neural stem cell neuroblasts. His lab investigates the generation of neuronal diversity and neural circuit formation in Drosophila melanogaster. Doe is also a member of the National Academy of Sciences.

== Awards and honours ==
- Award, Society for Developmental Biology Edwin G. Conklin Medal (2024)
- Member, American Academy of Arts and Sciences (2014)
- Investigator, Howard Hughes Medical Institute (1994)
- Fellow, American Association for the Advancement of Science
- Member, National Academy of Sciences (2017)
- Fellow, Searle Scholars Program (1990)
- Award, NIH MERIT award (2013)
- Award, Presidential Young Investigator Award (1990)
- Helen Hay Whitney Foundation, Postdoctoral fellow (1987)
- National Science Foundation, Predoctoral fellow (1981)
