= Yang Liu (immunologist) =

Chinese-American immunologist

- Education: Wuhan University (BS); Peking Union Medical College (MS); Australian National University PhD; Yale University School of Medicine PostDoc
- Scientific career
- Workplaces: University of Maryland, Baltimore
- Website: www.ihv.org/Research/Immunotherapy/Division-Faculty/

Yang Liu is a Chinese-American immunologist. He serves as director of the Division of Immunotherapy, Institute of Human Virology, University of Maryland Baltimore.

== Biography ==
Liu was an associate research scientist at Yale School of Medicine, and then an assistant, and subsequently associate professor at the New York University Medical Center from 1992 to 1998. From 1998 to 2006, he was the Kurtz Chair Professor and the director of Division of Cancer Immunology, Department of Pathology, at the Ohio State University. From 2006 to 2012, he was the De Nancrede Professor and The director of Division of Immunotherapy in the department of surgery at the University of Michigan. From 2012 to 2017, he was the Bosworth Professor and the director for the Center for Cancer and Immunology Research at The Children's National Medical Center. From 2018 to 2020, he was professor and the director at the Division of Immunotherapy, the Institute of Human Virology and the department of surgery at the University of Maryland School of Medicine.

Liu was the founder of OncoImmune, Inc. and served as its chairman and CEO. After acquisition of OncoImmune, Inc by Merck, Inc. Liu co-founded OncoC4, Inc and serves as its chairman, CEO and CSO.

== Research ==
Dr. Liu's research focuses on an age-old question: why do microbes induce life-long sterilizing immunity while cancer cannot? His interest in this question was kindled when he made the observation that viral activation of host antigen-presenting cells fundamentally altered the requirement for activation of CD8+ T cells when he was a graduate student at Australian National University. In his subsequent studies in Janeway laboratory at Yale University, he provided the first evidence that components from a diverse origin of microbes, which was called pathogen-associated molecular patterns by Janeway, induce co-stimulatory activity in antigen-presenting cells, and proposed that microbial induction of co-stimulatory molecules explains how the immune system distinguishes between "infectious non-self and non-infectious self". Later work from Dr. Liu's laboratory demonstrated that induction of B7-1 and B7-2 explains the function of infection on adaptive immunity.

As the flip side of the coin, his work elucidated the mechanism prevents the non-infectious innate immune stimuli from dying cells, which is collectively called danger-associated molecular patterns (DAMPs) from triggering strong immune responses. Based on these findings, he has his colleagues at OncoImmune Inc developed CD24Fc as a novel immunotherapeutic to target inflammation associated with tissue injuries. This drug is being tested in various diseases conditions to selectively regulate immunological diseases associated with cellular injuries, including autoimmune and metabolic diseases, and graft vs host diseases.

Dr. Liu is a pioneer in T cell costimulation and cancer immunotherapy. His work provides unique insights on the mechanism of immunotherapy, allowing development of safer and more effective immunotherapeutics to treat cancer with minimal immunotherapy-related adverse events.

== Honors ==
Liu has received Irvington Fellow (1990), the Markey Scholar Award (1992), and the Searle Scholar Award (1993), Graduate Teaching Award (2001), and Snyder Award for Cancer Research (2015) and was elected to fellow at the American Association for the Advancement of Science (AAAS) in 2004.
