= Russel Kaufman =

American researcher

Russel E. Kaufman is an American researcher who is president emeritus of The Wistar Institute in Philadelphia. In addition to his administrative role at Wistar, Kaufman maintains a research program that focuses on the genetics behind various types of blood diseases and cancer. During his time in research, some of Kaufman's discoveries include the characterization of the β-globin genes and the discovery of the CD7 ligand, K12. Additionally, he has focused on the regulation of genes expressed in hematopoietic stem cells and their progenitors.

Kaufman is active in a number of Philadelphia regional organizations and national organizations related to cancer research. He has served as chair of the Greater Philadelphia Life Sciences Congress, a board member of the board of directors for the University City Science Center, an adviser to the National Institutes of Health, and an adviser to the American Cancer Society. In 2008, Kaufman received the Cancer Control Award from the American Cancer Society for his "exemplary individual achievements in the field of cancer control.". In 2012, the Philadelphia Business Journal named Kaufman Life Sciences CEO of the Year.

Prior to taking his role at Wistar in 2002, Kaufman worked at Duke University Medical Center, where he served as chief resident, division chief of medical oncology, vice chair of the Department of Medicine, and vice dean for education and academic affairs.

== Select publications ==
- Ge, Y., Azuma, R., Gekonge, B., Lopez-Coral, A., Xiao, M., Zhang, G., Xu, X., Montaner, L., Wei, Z., Herlyn, M., Wang, T., Kaufman, Russel E.: Induction of metallothionein expression during monocyte to melanoma-associated macrophage differentiation. Front. Biol 7(4): 359–367, 2012.
- Wang, T., Ge, Y., Xiao, M., Lopez-Coral, A., Azuma, R., Somasundaram, R., Zhang, G., Wei, Z., Xu, X., Rauscher, FJ 3rd, Herlyn, M., Kaufman, R.E.: Melanoma-derived conditioned media efficiently induce the differentiation of monocytes to macrophages that display a highly invasive gene signature. Pigment Cell Melanoma Res 25:493-505, 2012.
- Wang, T., Huang, C., Lopez-Coral, A., Slentz-Kesler, K.A., Xiao, M., Wherry, E.J., Kaufman, R.E.: K12/SECTM1, an interferon regulated molecule, synergizes with CD28 to costimulate human T cell proliferation. J Leukoc Biol 91:449-459, 2012.
- Lam, G.K., Liao, H.X., Xue, Y., Alam, S.M., Scearce, R.M., Kaufman, R.E., Sempowski, G.D., Haynes, B.F.: Expression of the CD7 ligand K-12 in human thymic epithelial cells: regulation by IFN-gamma. J Clin Immunol 25:41-49, 2005.
- Sempowski, G.D., Lee, D.M., Kaufman, R.E., Haynes, B.F.: Structure and function of the CD7 molecule. Crit Rev Immunol 19:331-348, 1999.
