= Paul Greer =

American track and field athlete and coach

Paul Greer (born July 8, 1964) is an American former elite runner and track athlete. He is the longest serving coach of the San Diego Track Club and founder of the Rockin N Runnin Full and Half Marathon Training Program. Greer has served as the national coach for USA Track & Field at the world cross country championships, and has coached thousands of endurance athletes, including middle distance track athletes, marathon runners, IRONMAN triathletes, and various endurance sports enthusiasts. He has coached hundreds of Boston Marathon and numerous Olympic qualifiers.

In addition to his career in athletics, both running and coaching, Greer is a professor of Health and Exercise Science at San Diego City University and a best-selling author.

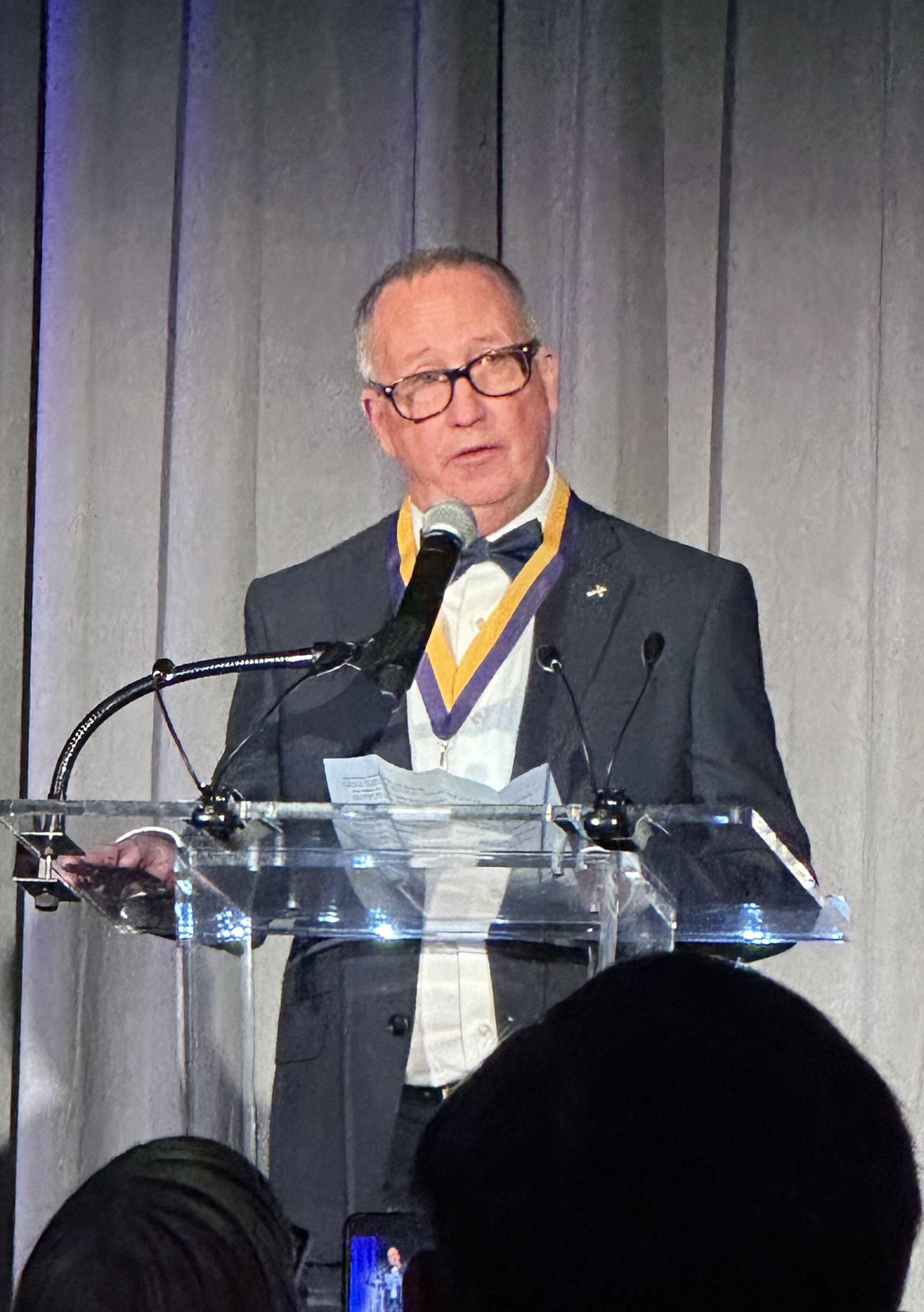
Paul Greer accepting the Augustinian Award (2025)

== High school and early running career ==
Greer attended St. Augustine High School, an all-boys school, and began his running career with the track and field team in 9th grade. In 1995, he was inducted into Saint Augustine High School’s Athletic Hall of Fame, and in 2025, received the school’s highest award given to an alumnus, the Augustinian Achievement Award for lifetime accomplishment and service to the community.

== College (1983 - 1988) ==
Greer attended San Diego State University. During his senior year in 1988, Greer set the school record for 1500-meters, running 3:42.44, which still stands as the best mark in school history. He graduated from San Diego State with a BA degree in Liberal Studies and a multiple subjects teaching credential. He later earned a Master’s Degree in Kinesiology from Azusa Pacific University in 1992.

== Post-college athletics career (1989 - 1996) ==
In 1989, Greer became the 168th American to run the mile in under four minutes in 3:59.79 at the Jackie Joyner Kersee Invitational.

In 1991, he ran the 1500 meters in 3:39.05, which was the 9th fastest 1500 meter time in the USA that year. He qualified for the British AAA National Championships 1500 meter final where he finished 10th.

In 1992, Greer was a USA Olympic Trials qualifier in the 1500 meters.

Paul competed on the European Track and Field Circuit from 1989 to 1996. During that time, Greer trained with three time Olympian Steve Scott.

== Professional career ==
Greer has been a professor in Health and Exercise Science at San Diego City College since 1989. He served as the Men’s Cross Country coach from 1989 to 2015, and was named the Pacific Coast Conference Coach of the Year numerous times. Greer has also served as the fitness center director at the college and continues to serve as a lecturer in the Kinesiology program.

== Coaching career ==
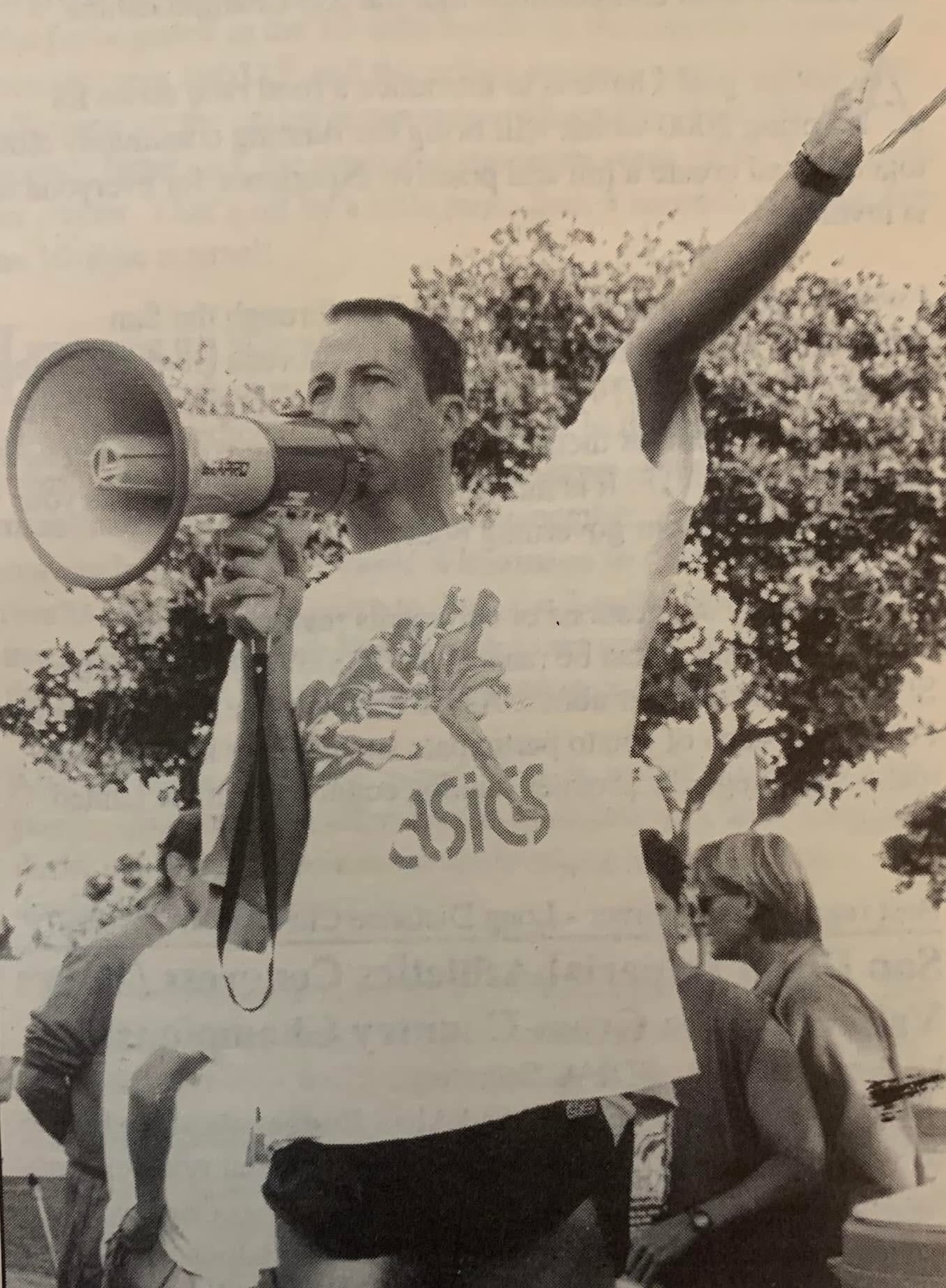
Coach Paul Greer speaking to runners at the San Diego Track Club

In 1985, Greer began coaching the San Diego Track Club, a position he still holds. He is a staple of the San Diego running community and his workouts on Tuesday evenings attract over one hundred runners every week.

In 1998, he founded the Rockin N Runnin Full and Half Marathon Training Program preparing runners for the Rock N Roll San Diego Marathon/Half Marathon.

In 2016, United States Track and Field selected Greer to serve as the Men’s coach for Team USA’s senior (20-35) and U20 teams at the Great Edinburgh Cross Country Championships. In 2024, he was selected again by United States Track and Field to serve as the men’s coach for Team USA’s U20 team at the 2024 World Athletics Cross Country Championships in Belgrade, Serbia, where Team USA finished 7th.

Since 2016, Greer has served as secretary for the National Cross Country Council governing body and in 2019 resumed the role as USATF San Diego-Imperial Association President.

=== National coaching awards ===
- 2012: United States Cross Country Council Doris Heritage Award
- 2019: USATF President's Award

== Event promoter ==
In 2000, Greer founded the Dirt Dog Cross Country Series in San Diego. He founded the Summer Nights Track and Field Series, which has seen thousands of track and field athletes participate since the first meet in 2010.

== Author ==
In 2024, Greer authored Going the Distance, Strategies from the First Stride to the Finish Line.

== Personal life ==
Greer resides in San Diego, California with his wife Callie. The couple engages in several ministries together including Witness to Love, Juvenile Hall Detention Ministry, and Culture of Life Services.

Raised Roman Catholic, Greer and his wife are parishioners of Immaculata Catholic Church in San Diego.

After 42 years of running Greer hosted an event that commemorated the last mile of his life on May 31, 2022, with over 350 people attending the event. Fourteen days later Greer underwent hip replacement surgery.

Greer has an avid interest in traveling, and has run with the bulls in Pamplona, Spain five times, climbed to the top of both Mount Kilimanjaro and Mont Blanc, and has ridden his bike of the Swiss and Italian Alps.
