= Hermann Steller =

- Born: April 25, 1957; Bad Nauheim, Germany
- Education: University of Frankfurt; European Molecular Biology Laboratory and University of Heidelberg
- Scientific career
- Fields: Developmental Biology, Apoptosis
- Workplaces: Rockefeller University; Massachusetts Institute of Technology
- Website: https://www.rockefeller.edu/our-scientists/heads-of-laboratories/908-hermann-steller/

Hermann Steller (born 25 April 1957) is the head of the Strang Laboratory of Apoptosis and Cancer Biology at The Rockefeller University, and a Fellow of the American Association for the Advancement of Science.

Steller pioneered the use of Drosophila as a genetic model for cell death research. He described and characterized the first cell death genes in the fly, Reaper and Hid, and the first Drosophila caspase.

== Education ==
Steller earned his Diplom in microbiology from Goethe University Frankfurt, and his Ph.D. from the European Molecular Biology Laboratory and the University of Heidelberg in 1984.

== Career ==
After post graduate work at The University of California, Berkeley, Steller became a professor of neurobiology at the Massachusetts Institute of Technology before becoming head of lab at The Rockefeller University. Steller was also a Howard Hughes Medical Investigator from 1990 to 2016

Steller's laboratory studies the regulation of apoptosis, how defects in this process contribute to diseases, and how insights into apoptotic pathways can be exploited for the design of new therapies.

== Award and honors ==
- 1988 Searle Scholar Award, Chicago Community Trust https://www.searlescholars.net/people/hermann-steller
- 1989 Pew Scholar in the Biomedical Sciences
- 1990-2016, HHMI Investigator
- 2006 Jonathan Magnes Award Hebrew University
- 2001 Lady Davis Award, Faculty of Medicine, Technion, Israel
- American Association for the Advancement of Science (AAAS) fellowship
- 2016 International Cell Death Society Award
