= Margaret T. Fuller =

American developmental biologist

- Other name: Minx
- Education: Brandeis University (BA); Massachusetts Institute of Technology (PhD)
- Known for: Stem cells, spermatogenesis
- Spouse: Matthew P. Scott
- Scientific career
- Fields: Developmental biology
- Workplaces: Stanford University
- Doctoral advisor: Jonathan King

Margaret "Minx" Tatnall Fuller is an American developmental biologist known for her research on the male germ line and defining the role of the stem cell environment (the hub cells that establish the niche of particular cells) in specifying cell fate and differentiation.

Fuller is the Reed-Hodgson Professor of Human Biology at Stanford University, and former chair of the Stanford Department of Developmental Biology.

== Biography ==
Fuller earned a B.A. in physics from Brandeis University in 1974, and a Ph.D. in microbiology from MIT in 1980, working with Jonathan King. She completed her postdoctoral work in developmental genetics at Indiana University, working with Elizabeth Raff and Thomas Kaufman, from 1980 to 1983. Fuller joined the University of Colorado faculty and then joined Stanford University in 1990, where she began working on spermatogenesis, doing genetic analysis of microtubule structure and function.

Fuller is married to fellow biologist Matthew P. Scott.

== Key papers ==
- Raff, E.C. and M. T. Fuller, et al., "Regulation of tubulin gene expression during embryogenesis in Drosophila melanogaster", Cell v.28, pp. 33–40 (1982).
- Fuller, M.T. et al., "Genetic Analysis of Microtubule Structure: A b-tubulin Mutation Causes the Formation of Aberrant Microtubule in vivo and in vitro", Journal of Cell Biology, v.104, pp. 385–394 (1987).
- Fuller, M.T. and P.G. Wilson, "Force and Counter Force in the Mitotic Spindle", Cell, v.71, pp. 547–550 (1992).
- Fuller, M.T., "Riding the Polar Winds: Chromosomes Motor Down East," Cell, v.81, pp. 5–8 (1995).
- Hales, K.G., M.T. Fuller, "Developmentally Regulated Mitochondrial Fusion Mediated by a Conserved, Novel, Predicted GTPase", Cell (1997).
- G. J. Hermann, J.W. Thatcher, J.P. Mills, K.G. Hales, M.T. Fuller, "Mitochondrial Fusion in Yeast Requires the Transmembrane GTPase Fzo1p", Journal of Cell Biology (1998).
- Kiger, A., H. White-Cooper, and M.T. fuller, "Somatic support cells restrict germ line stem cell self-renewal and promote differentiation", Nature v.407, pp. 750–754 (2000).

=== Additional publications ===
- Margaret T. Fuller and Allan C. Spradling, Review, "Male and Female Drosophila Germline Stem Cells: Two Versions of Immortality", Science, v.316, n.5823, pp. 402–404 (April 20, 2007).

== Awards ==
- 1980 - Jane Coffin Childs Fellow
- 1985-86 - Searle Scholar
- 2004 - Reed-Hodgson Professor, Human Biology, Stanford University
- 2006 - Elected member, American Academy of Arts and Sciences
- 2008 - Elected member, National Academy of Sciences
- 2022 - Genetics Society of America Medal
