= Peter J. Turnbaugh =

American microbiologist (born c. 1981)

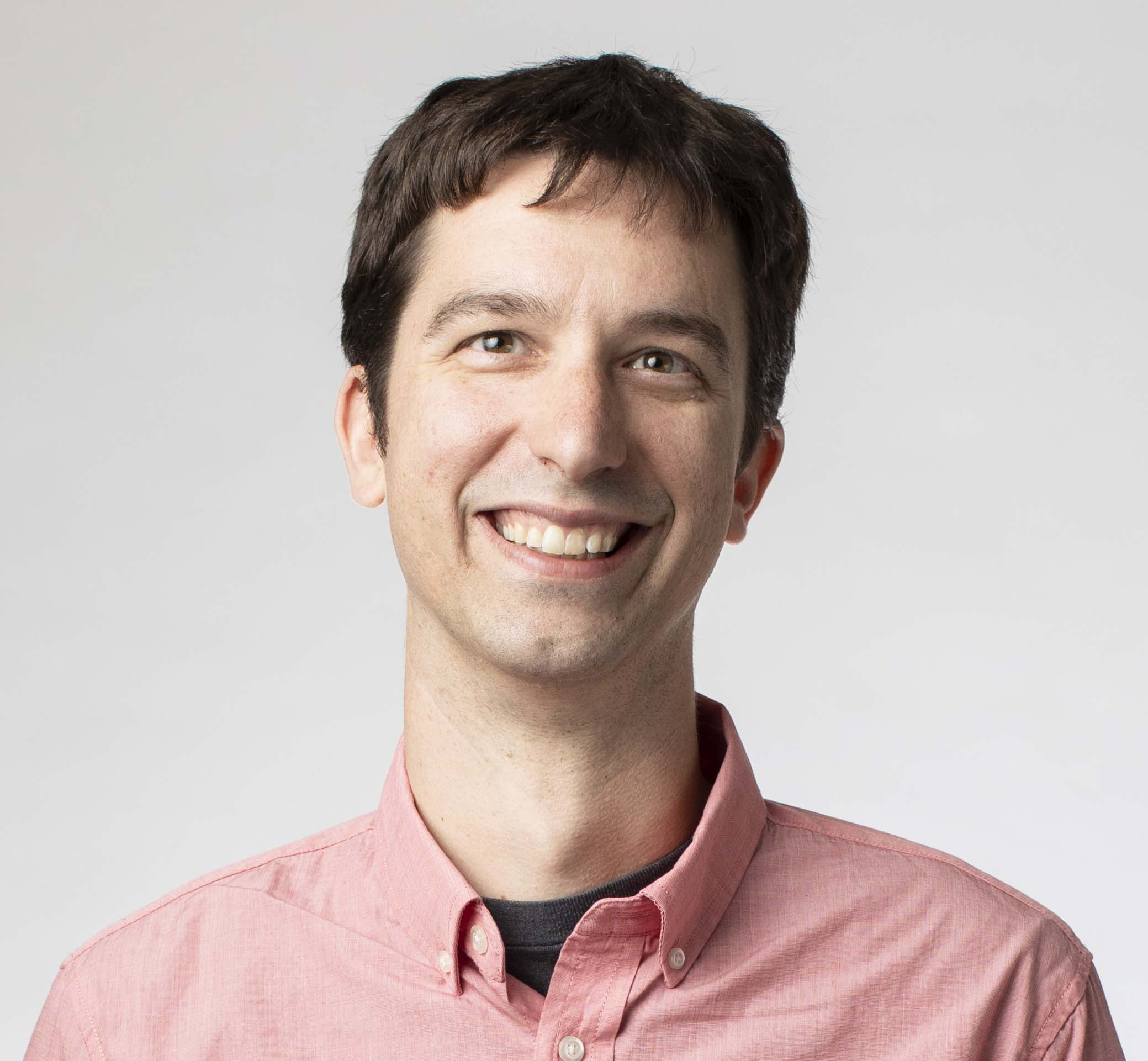
- Born: c. 1981 (age 44–45); United States
- Education: Washington University in St. Louis; Whitman College
- Known for: Microbiome Research
- Scientific career
- Fields: Microbiology
- Workplaces: University of California, San Francisco
- Doctoral advisor: Jeffrey I. Gordon

Peter J. Turnbaugh (born c. 1981) is a microbiologist and a professor at University of California, San Francisco. He is known for his research on the metabolic activities performed by the trillions of microbes that colonize humans' adult bodies. Turnbaugh and his research group use interdisciplinary approaches in preclinical models and human cohorts to study the mechanisms through which the gut microbiome influences nutrition and pharmacology.

== Education ==
Turnbaugh received a B.A. in Biochemistry, Biophysics, and Molecular Biology from Whitman College and a Ph.D. in Microbial Genetics and Genomics from Washington University in St. Louis.

== Career ==
From 2010 to 2014 he was a Bauer Fellow in the FAS Center for Systems Biology at Harvard University, where he established an independent research group prior to starting his faculty position at the University of California, San Francisco. Notable honors include the Kipnis Award in Biomedical Sciences, the Needleman Pharmacology Prize, the Damon Runyon-Rachleff Innovation Award, the Searle Scholars Award, and the Burroughs Wellcome Fund Investigators in the Pathogenesis of Disease Award.

== Selected honors ==
- 2006 National Science Foundation Graduate Fellowship, National Science Foundation
- 2009 David M. Kipnis Award in Biomedical Sciences, Washington University in St. Louis
- 2010 Philip Needleman Pharmacology Prize, Washington University in St. Louis
- 2016 Damon Runyon-Rachleff Innovation Award, Damon Runyon Cancer Research Foundation
- 2016 Searle Scholar, Kinship Foundation
- 2018 CZ Biohub Investigator, Microbiome Initiative, Chan Zuckerberg Biohub
- 2018 American Society for Microbiology Young Investigator Award
- 2018 Burroughs Wellcome Fund Investigators in the Pathogenesis of Disease Award
- 2020 Tri-institutional partnership for microbiome research pilot awards
