= Paul W. Sternberg =

American biologist

Paul W. Sternberg is an American biologist. He does research for WormBase on C. elegans, a model organism.

== Early life and education ==
Paul Sternberg grew up in Long Island, New York. He attended Hampshire College for undergrad in Amherst, Massachusetts where he received his B.A. in 1978. After that he went to MIT where he received his PhD in Biology for work on nematode development with Robert Horvitz. He went on to do postdoctoral research with Ira Herskowitz in yeast molecular development at the University of California San Francisco. He is currently the Thomas Hunt Morgan Professor of Biology at the California Institute of Technology.

== WormBase ==
Sternberg is a Primary investigator for WormBase. WormBase is a data repository for nematode biology. C. elegans has been used in studies of development and neurobiology. WormBase has information from nine species and five are from the genus Caenorhabditis, one of which is C. elegans. WormBase provides: a genome browser, genome, gene and protein sets for searches on sequence similarities and gene and protein summaries.

== Gene Ontology Consortium ==
He also serves as a primary investigator for the Gene Ontology Consortium. The consortium provides knowledge on the functions of genes and gene products. It was founded in 1998 and is widely accepted in the life sciences. The Gene Ontology resource has the most comprehensive information about the functions of genes.”The ontology covers three distinct aspects of gene function: molecular function, cellular component, and biological process”.

== Current research ==
Sternberg is a coauthor on the article, "Autism-associated missense genetic variants impact locomotion and neurodevelopment in Caenorhabditis elegans" (2019). They used C. elegans as a genetic model to look for phenotypic missense alleles collected from autism spectrum disorder studies done in humans. Missense variants cause around half the genetic changes that are known to cause disease. They used CRISPR-Cas9 to generate C. elegans equivalent human missense mutants. They compared the phenotypes from the missense mutants to the wildtype and known loss-of-function mutant controls in the autism-associated missense alleles. They found that 70% of missense alleles showed evident phenotypic changes in locomotion, morphology, and fecundity. They used this method to show subtle phenotypic changes and the effect that missense mutations can have on human disease. They did find that 14 missense variants have a significant function in C. elegans orthologs of human genes.

== Publications ==
"Gonadal cell lineages of the nematode Panagrellus redivivus and implications for evolution by the modification of cell lineage"(1981) Sternberg and Horvitz compared the gonadal cell lineages of Panagrellus redivivus to the gonadal lineages of C.elegans. They found that the death of Z4.pp is what probably prevents the posterior ovary in P. redivivus from developing which in C. elegans controls the development of that posterior ovary. This is thought to be the reason why there is a gross difference in the morphology of the P.redivivus female gonads and the C.elegans hermaphrodite.

"Postembryonic nongonadal cell lineages of the nematode Panagrellus redivivus: Description and comparison with those of Caenorhabditis elegans" (1982) Horvitz and Sternberg looked at the postembryonic nongonodal cell lineages of P.redivivus and compared it to C.elegans. They found minor differences in the two cell lineages and found that the differences are because of two types of evolutionary changes.

“Mutations that affect neural cell lineages and cell fates during the development of the nematode Caenorhabditis elegans"(1983) In this publication they found 19 genes in C. elegans that affected neural cell fate and cell lineages during development. Mutations in genes lin-22, lin-12, unc-86, and ced-3 can cause specific transformations in the fate of particular cells. They found that these genes and others may act in a hierarchy to affect decisions at different stages within cell lineages. They found that unc-86 can affect non neural aspects of development even though it is specific for neural lineages.

"Multiple functions of let-23, a caenorhabditis elegans receptor tyrosine kinase gene required for vulval induction”(1991) Let-23 gene has many different functions during C.elegans development. Aroian and Sternberg found that let-23 function is necessary for vulval precursor cells to answer the signal responsible for vulval differentiation. The let-23 receptor tyrosine kinase controls two opposing pathways. One pathway is responsible for stimulating vulval differentiation and the other prevents vuval differentiation. They also discovered that let-23 kinase function in at least 5 different tissues.

“The lin-15 locus encodes two negative regulators of caenorhabditis elegans vulval development.”(1994) lin-15 is a negative regulator of vuval differentiation. Huang, Tzou, and Sternberg discovered that lin-15 encodes 2 transcripts that do not overlap and are transcribed in the same direction. They were able to analyze what role lin-15 plays in the signaling pathway and found that lin-15 acts upstream and parallel to the inductive signal of let-23.

“A gonad-derived survival signal for vulval precursor cells in two nematode species”(1998) Felix and Sternberg discovered that there is a survival signal that prevents cell death in vulval precursor cells in T.aceti and Halicephalobus sp. Ablation of the gonads in these two nematodes causes vulval precursor cell death. This is opposite of what is seen in C.elegans and many other nematode species typically if there is ablation of the gonads the vulval precursor cells default to an epidermal fate and do not undergo programmed cell death.

“Evidence of a mate-finding cue in the hermaphrodite nematode Caenorhabditis elegans”(2002) Simon and Sternberg performed several different assays and found that males specifically, respond to a sexually dimorphic cue that hermaphrodites gives off. They found that the cue is not discharged from vulva tissue. The cue is likely detected by a chemosensory organ in the male. Their findings demonstrated that males do have a preference in mate selection and hermaphrodites do play a role in mating.

“An imaging system for standardized quantitative analysis of C. elegans behavior”(2004) Sternberg et al., created a widely available quantitative method to evaluate behavioral phenotypes. They were able to record behavior at high magnification, over long periods of time, and quantify behaviorally relevant features for later analysis. This makes it possible to easily compare data from different labs by standardizing behavioral assays. It would also allow the recording of individual nematodes and quantify 144 specific phenotype parameters.

== Popular publications ==
Below are some of Sternberg's most-cited publications:

- Müller, Hans-Michael; Kenny, Eimear E.; Sternberg, Paul W. (2004). "Textpresso: An Ontology-Based Information Retrieval and Extraction System for Biological Literature". PLOS Biology. 2 (11): e309. doi:10.1371/journal.pbio.0020309. PMC 517822. PMID 15383839.
- Greenwald, Iva S.; Sternberg, Paul W.; Robert Horvitz, H. (1983). "The lin-12 locus specifies cell fates in caenorhabditis elegans". Cell. 34 (2): 435–444. doi:10.1016/0092-8674(83)90377-X. PMID 6616618. S2CID 40668388.
- Levchenko, A.; Bruck, J.; Sternberg, P. W. (2000). "Scaffold proteins may biphasically affect the levels of mitogen-activated protein kinase signaling and reduce its threshold properties". Proceedings of the National Academy of Sciences. 97 (11): 5818–5823. Bibcode:2000PNAS...97.5818L. doi:10.1073/pnas.97.11.5818. PMC 18517. PMID 10823939.
- Aroian, Raffi V.; Koga, Makoto; Mendel, Jane E.; Ohshima, Yasumi; Sternberg, Paul W. (1990). "The let-23 gene necessary for Caenorhabditis elegans vulval induction encodes a tyrosine kinase of the EGF receptor subfamily". Nature. 348 (6303): 693–699. Bibcode:1990Natur.348..693A. doi:10.1038/348693a0. PMID 1979659. S2CID 4358437.

== Awards and recognition ==
- January 2024: Awarded the Thomas Hunt Morgan Metal for lifetime contributions to the field of genetics
- September 2024: Named Chair of Caltech's Division of Biology and Biological Engineering (BBE)

== Memberships ==
- American Academy of Arts and Sciences
- National Academy of Sciences
- Fellow of the American Association for the Advancement of Science

== Students ==
Raffi Aroian, Russell Hill, Gregg Jongeward, Linda Huang, Junho Lee, Charles Yoon, Thomas R Clandinin,

== Postdoctoral Fellows ==
Min Han, Paul S. Kayne, Ralf Sommer, Marie-Anne Félix, David Sherwood, Mihoko Kato Cheryl Van Buskirk, Xian Xu, Erich M. Schwarz Yen-Ping Hsueh, Hillel Schwartz
