= Transposition =

Transposition may refer to:

== Logic and mathematics ==
- Transposition (mathematics), a permutation which exchanges two elements and keeps all others fixed
- Transposition, producing the transpose of a matrix A^{T}, which is computed by swapping columns for rows in the matrix A
- Transpose of a linear map
- Transposition (logic), a rule of replacement in philosophical logic
- Transpose relation, another name for converse relation

== Games ==
- Transposition (chess), different moves or a different move order leading to the same position, especially during the openings
- Transposition table, used in computer games to speed up the search of the game tree

== Biology ==
- Transposition (birth defect), a group of congenital defects involving an abnormal spatial arrangement of tissue or organ
  - Transposition of the great vessels, cardiac transposition, a congenital heart defect with malformation of any of the major vessels
  - Transposition of teeth
  - Penoscrotal transposition
- Transposition (horizontal gene transfer), the transfer of genetic material between organisms other than by vertical gene transfer
- Transposons, or genetic transposition, a mutation in which a chromosomal segment is transferred to a new position on the same or another chromosome

== Other uses ==
- Transposition (law), the incorporation of the provisions of a European Union directive into a Member State's domestic law
- Transposition (music), moving a note or collection of notes up or down in pitch by a constant number of semitones
- Transposition (transmission lines), periodic swapping of positions of the conductors of a transmission line
- Transposition cipher, an elementary cryptographic operation
- Transposition, docking, and extraction an orbital maneuver performed on the Apollo lunar missions
- Transposition, sleight of hand (magic), a performer appears to make two different objects ([usually] coins or cards) switch places with one another faster than physically possible.
- Transpose, a database of academic journal preprinting policies maintained by ASAPbio
