= Metaphosphatase =

Metaphosphatase may refer to:

- Endopolyphosphatase, an enzyme
- Exopolyphosphatase, an enzyme
