= Anita Corbett =

American biochemist and academic

- Born: Anita Hargrave Corbett
- Education: Colgate University (BS); Vanderbilt University (PhD)
- Scientific career
- Fields: mRNA processing Polyadenylation; Gene expression Intellectual disability
- Workplaces: Emory University
- Thesis: Regulation of the catalytic cycle of topoisomerase II (1992)
- Doctoral advisor: Neil Osheroff
- Website: biology.emory.edu/corbett

Anita Hargrave Corbett is an American biochemist who is the Samuel C. Dobbs Professor in the Department of Biology at Emory University. Her research investigates the molecular basis for disease, the regulation of protein import and mRNA export. She is a Fellow of the American Association for the Advancement of Science and the American Society for Biochemistry and Molecular Biology.

== Early life and education ==
As a high school student, Corbett took part in the National Science Bowl. She has said that her high school chemistry teacher made her believe she could be a chemist, and encouraged her to take AP Chemistry. She was an undergraduate student at Colgate University, where she became interested in biochemistry, and studied the activation and inhibition of bovine carbonic anhydrase. Corbett was a doctoral researcher at Vanderbilt University, where she studied the regulation of topoisomerase II supervised by Neil Osheroff.

== Research and career ==
After her PhD, she moved to Harvard Medical School as a postdoctoral researcher with Pamela Silver.

In 2003, Corbett was the first woman to be tenured in the Emory University School of Medicine. Her research investigates the regulation of biological processes, including the import of proteins and export of mRNA. She studies these processes using model systems of yeast, Drosophila and laboratory mice. It is well understood that disease is linked to mutations in genes encoding structural RNA exosome subunits. Corbett linked mutations in one particular subunit, EXOSC5, to poor clinical outcomes. She has extensively investigated RNA-binding proteins, which are involved with various stages of gene expression.

=== Awards and honors ===
- 2015 Eleanor Main Graduate Faculty Mentor Award
- 2018 Nature Awards for Mentoring in Science
- 2020 American Society for Biochemistry and Molecular Biology Mid-Career Leadership Award
- 2022 Elected Fellow of the American Association for the Advancement of Science
- 2022 Elected Fellow of the American Society for Biochemistry and Molecular Biology
- 2022 RNA Society Award for Excellence in Inclusive Leadership

=== Selected publications ===
- Allison Lange; Ryan E. Mills; Christopher J Lange; Murray Stewart; Scott E Devine; Anita H Corbett (14 December 2006). "Classical nuclear localization signals: definition, function, and interaction with importin alpha". Journal of Biological Chemistry. 282 (8): 5101–5105. doi:10.1074/jbc.r600026200. ISSN 0021-9258. PMC 4502416. PMID 17170104. Wikidata Q34591163.
- Debashish Ray; Hilal Kazan; Kate B Cook; et al. (1 July 2013). "A compendium of RNA-binding motifs for decoding gene regulation". Nature. 499 (7457): 172–177. doi:10.1038/nature12311. ISSN 1476-4687. PMC 3929597. PMID 23846655. Wikidata Q34357005.
- David S Goldfarb; Anita H Corbett; D Adam Mason; Michelle T Harreman; Stephen A. Adam (1 September 2004). "Importin alpha: a multipurpose nuclear-transport receptor". Trends in Cell Biology (in English and English). 14 (9): 505–514. doi:10.1016/j.tcb.2004.07.016. ISSN 0962-8924. PMID 15350979. Wikidata Q35879618.
