= PPX =

PPX may refer to:

- Dextropropoxyphene, an analgesic in the opioid category
- Exopolyphosphatase, a phosphatase enzyme
- Popular Science Predictions Exchange, an online virtual prediction market
- PPX (record company), a record label active during the 1960s and 1970s
- ppx.info A domain name May Belongs to them
