= Sylvy Kornberg =

American biochemist

- Born: 1917; Rochester, New York, U.S.
- Died: June 6, 1986 (aged 69); Portola Valley, California, U.S.
- Education: University of Rochester
- Known for: research on DNA replication and polyphosphate synthesis
- Spouse: Arthur Kornberg
- Children: 3
- Scientific career
- Fields: Biochemistry
- Workplaces: National Cancer Institute; Washington University in St. Louis; Stanford University
- Academic advisors: Walter Bloor

Sylvy Kornberg née Sylvia Ruth Levy (1917– June 6, 1986) was an American biochemist who carried out research on DNA replication and polyphosphate synthesis. She discovered and characterized polyphosphate kinase (PPK), an enzyme that helps build long chains of phosphate groups called polyphosphate (PolyP) that play a variety of metabolic and regulatory functions. She worked closely with her husband and research partner, Arthur Kornberg, contributing greatly to the characterization of DNA polymerization that earned him the 1959 Nobel Prize in Physiology or Medicine.

== Early life and education ==
Sylvy Kornberg was born Sylvia Ruth Levy in 1917 in Rochester, New York. She was the eldest of three children to parents who were Jewish refugees from Latvia and Belarus with no formal education who had worked in factories their entire lives. After high school, she enrolled in the University of Rochester, stating on her application that English and American history were her favorite subjects, while listing chemistry and general science as her least favorites. Her attitude towards science soon changed—she became enamored to the point where she commuted from the College for Women's campus to the River Campus—the College for Men—to take advanced biology and chemistry courses that were only offered there. She was one of the few female students to do so.

She earned an undergraduate degree in biochemistry in 1938, then went on to earn a Masters of Science in biochemistry in 1940, also from the University of Rochester. She carried out her graduate research at the university's School of Medicine and Dentistry under Walter Bloor, who specialized in lipids. Her work during this time focused on lipid metabolism and characterizing lipids in tumors. While at the University of Rochester, she served as editor of the campus newsletter, The Tower Times. It was also here that she met her future husband and research partner, Arthur Kornberg, who was a medical school student at the time.

== Career and research ==
After earning her master's degree in biochemistry from the University of Rochester, she took a position at the National Cancer Institute, in Bethesda, Maryland, where she worked jointly with organic chemist Jonathan Hartwell, synthesizing novel carcinogens from plant extracts and biologist Murray Shear, studying their effects on mice. She re-met Arthur in Bethesda, where he had taken a position at the National Institutes of Health. They got married in 1943 and had three sons between 1947 and 1950. Kornberg took time off from the lab during this period to act as a full-time mother and wife. During this time she edited science books from home for Interscience Publishers (now part of Wiley) and returned to the lab when her youngest son, Kenneth, was 3.

In 1953 they moved to Washington University School of Medicine, where Arthur took a position as professor and chair of the microbiology department. They stayed there from 1953 to 1959, during which time Kornberg worked in the lab with Arthur, and contributed greatly to the work on DNA replication that would earn him the 1959 Nobel Prize in Physiology or Medicine, which he shared with Severo Ochoa. In Arthur's 1959 autobiography, For the Love of Enzymes, Arthur writes that Sylvy "contributed significantly to the science surrounding the discovery of DNA polymerase."

One large contribution Kornberg made to the work on DNA replication was the discovery and characterization of a contaminating enzyme that was inhibiting the DNA polymerization process they were trying to study. Kornberg was able to isolate and characterize the culprit: an enzyme that was degrading one of the DNA building blocks, deoxyguanosine triphosphate (dGTP) by removing its phosphates as a "tripolyphosphate" before it could be added. As Robert Lehman, who was a postdoctoral researcher in the lab at the time and is now a professor emeritus at Stanford, puts it, "We were having a major problem with inhibitors of the replication reaction, and she solved the problem."

Her work during her time at Washington University in St. Louis also included research into an enzyme responsible for synthesizing long chains of phosphate groups, called polyphosphate (PolyP) and studying their role in helping cells store and retrieve energy. In 1955 she isolated an enzyme from E. coli bacteria that synthesized PolyP and named it polyphosphate kinase (PPK). This was the second example of enzymatic catalysis of a polymer.

In 1959, the Kornbergs moved to California, where Arthur had accepted a position as chief of biochemistry at Stanford University. Sylvy continued to work with Arthur there for a couple of years before retiring. At Stanford, she researched how bacteria-infecting viruses (bacteriophages) are able to avoid destruction of bacterial DNA by modifying their own DNA letters through the addition of glucose molecules. Sylvy isolated and characterized several of the enzymes the bacteriophages make to carry out this glucosylation. After retiring, she continued to review and edit manuscripts from home, and returned to the lab for a couple more years to work with Arthur on studying the mechanism of how the anticancer drug bleomycin interferes with DNA replication.

== Personal life ==
Sylvy married Arthur Kornberg in 1943 and they had three sons. Sylvy and Arthur provided strong scientific stimulation in the home as is reflected in their sons' career choices. Their eldest, Roger Kornberg, became a professor of structural biology at Stanford University and received the Nobel Prize in Physiology or Medicine in 2006 for work on transcription, the process in which the DNA instructions for making proteins are first copied into messenger RNA. Their middle son, Thomas B. Kornberg, became a professor of biochemistry and physics at the University of California, San Francisco, and was the first to characterize DNA polymerases II and III. Their youngest son, Kenneth Kornberg, became an architect and president of Kornberg Associates, which specializes in designing research campuses, buildings and laboratories. Sylvy was stricken by a rare neurodegenerative disease related to ALS, whose first symptoms arose in the late 1970s. She became reliant on a wheelchair, requiring round-the-clock care, and died at home in Portola Valley, California, June 6, 1986, at the age of 69. Arthur Kornberg returned to the study of PolyP in his later research years, after her death.

== Selected works ==
- Sylvy's isolation and characterization of an enzyme that degrades deoxyguanosine triphosphate (dGTP) and was interfering with their studies of DNA polymerization: Kornberg, S. R.; Lehman, I. R.; Bessman, M. J.; Simms, E. S.; Kornberg, A. (July 1958). "Enzymatic cleavage of deoxyguanosine triphosphate to deoxyguanosine and tripolyphosphate". The Journal of Biological Chemistry. 233 (1): 159–162. doi:10.1016/S0021-9258(19)68047-6. ISSN 0021-9258. PMID 13563461.
- Sylvy's isolation and characterization of E. coli polyphosphate kinase: Kornberg, Arthur; Kornberg, S. R.; Simms, Ernest S. (1956-01-01). "Metaphosphate synthesis by an enzyme from Escherichia coli". Biochimica et Biophysica Acta. 20 (1): 215–227. doi:10.1016/0006-3002(56)90280-3. ISSN 0006-3002. PMID 13315368.
- Sylvy's characterization of the bacteriophage enzymes that modify their DNA to avoid degradation: Glucosylation of deoxyribonucleic acid by enzymes from bacteriophage-infected Escherichia coli.Kornberg, Arthur; Kornberg, S. R.; Simms, Ernest S. (1956-01-01). "Metaphosphate synthesis by an enzyme from Escherichia coli". Biochimica et Biophysica Acta. 20 (1): 215–227. doi:10.1016/0006-3002(56)90280-3. ISSN 0006-3002. PMID 13315368.
