= William T. Wickner =

Bill Wickner
- Born: William T. Wickner; March 13, 1946 (age 79)
- Education: Yale University (BA); Harvard Medical School (MD); Stanford University (PostDoc)
- Known for: Studying of yeast vacuole fusion as a model for membrane fusion
- Relatives: Reed Wickner (brother)
- Scientific career
- Fields: Biochemistry; Cell Biology
- Institutions: Harvard Medical School; Stanford University; University of California, Los Angeles; Dartmouth College
- Academic advisors: Arthur Kornberg; Eugene P. Kennedy
- Notable students: Gail Mandel; Franz-Ulrich Hartl; Pamela Silver
- Website: dartmouth.edu/~wickner

William T. Wickner (born March 13, 1946), is an authority on membrane fusion, a fundamental process in all eukaryotic cells.

== Education ==
Bill Wickner, brother of prion biologist Reed Wickner and Cornell graduate Nancy Wickner Kogan, is a 1967 graduate of Yale University (chemistry) and a 1973 M.D. graduate of Harvard Medical School. At Harvard, he worked with Eugene P. Kennedy.

== Career and research ==
He conducted post-doctoral research with Arthur Kornberg at Stanford University, co-discovering the role of an RNA primer in the replication of DNA. He began his independent research career as a Mellon senior fellow at Stanford in 1974, where he initiated studies of asymmetric membrane assembly in bacteria.

Wickner then spent 17 years on the faculty of UCLA, during which time he earned honors including an American Cancer Society Faculty Research Award, a Guggenheim Fellowship and an NIH MERIT Award.

In 1993, he moved to Dartmouth Medical School, where he became chair of the biochemistry department.

Wickner has trained many successful scientists including Franz-Ulrich Hartl, Gail Mandel, Pamela Silver, Gunnar von Heijne. Wickner's Lab currently explores yeast vacuole fusion as a model for membrane fusion.

== Awards and honors ==
Wickner was elected to the National Academy of Sciences in 1996. In 2017, he received the William C. Rose Award of the ASBMB. Wickner is also a foreign associate of the European Molecular Biology Organization and a member of the American Academy of Arts and Sciences
