= Pamela Silver =

American biologist

- Born: Pamela Ann Silver
- Education: University of California, Santa Cruz (BS); University of California, Los Angeles (PhD)
- Scientific career
- Fields: Synthetic biology Systems biology
- Workplaces: Harvard Medical School; Princeton University
- Thesis: Mechanisms of membrane assembly : studies on the association of an integral protein with biological membranes (1982)
- Doctoral advisor: William T. Wickner
- Doctoral students: Christina Agapakis; Valerie Weiss
- Other notable students: Karmella Haynes; Jessica Polka; Anita Corbett
- Website: www.silverlabhms.org

Pamela Ann Silver is an American biologist, bioengineer and professor. She is the Elliot T. and Onie H. Adams Professorship of Biochemistry and Systems Biology at Harvard Medical School. Silver is one of the founding Core Faculty Members of the Wyss Institute for Biologically Inspired Engineering at Harvard University.

She has made contributions to the fields of cell and nuclear biology, systems biology, RNA biology, cancer therapeutics, international policy research, and graduate education. Silver was the first director of the Harvard University Graduate Program in Systems Biology. She serves as a member of the National Science Advisory Board for Biosecurity.

== Early life and education ==
Silver grew up in Atherton, California, where she attended Laurel and Encinal Elementary Schools. During this time, she was a winner of the IBM Math Competition, winning a slide rule, and received special recognition for her early aptitude in science. She attended Menlo-Atherton High School and graduated from Castilleja School in Palo Alto. She received her B.A. in chemistry from the University of California, Santa Cruz and her PhD in Biological Chemistry from the University of California, Los Angeles in 1982 in the laboratory of William T. Wickner, working largely on the coat assembly of the M13 coliphage.

== Career ==
Silver did her postdoctoral research with Mark Ptashne at Harvard University where she discovered one of the first nuclear localization sequences. She continued to study the mechanism of nuclear localization in her own lab as an assistant professor at Princeton University. During this time, she characterized the receptor for NLSs and discovered one of the first eukaryotic DnaJ chaperones.

Silver continued in the area of Cell Biology upon moving to the Dana Farber Cancer Institute to hold the Claudia Adams Barr Investigatorship and to become Associate Professor of Biological Chemistry and Molecular Pharmacology at Harvard Medical School and Dana-Farber. During this time, she was among the first to follow GFP-tagged proteins in living cells. In addition, she initiated early studies in systems biology to examine interactions within the nucleus on a whole genome scale. Together with Bill Sellers, she discovered molecules that block nuclear export and formed the basis for a publicly traded company Karyopharm Therapeutics. She was promoted in 1997 to Professor of Biological Chemistry and Molecular Pharmacology at Harvard Medical School and Dana-Farber.

In 2004, Silver moved to the newly formed Department of Systems Biology at Harvard Medical School as a Professor. Around this time, she worked closely with the Synthetic Biology Working Group at MIT and made the decision to move her research group into Synthetic Biology. She observed the motion of the carbon fixing organelles in photosynthetic bacteria. She has worked extensively on designing modified bacteria to act as sensors for exposure to a drug or inflammation in the mammalian gut. She has served as the Director of an ARPA-E (DOE) project on electrofuels.

Her former students include Christina Agapakis, Valerie Weiss, Karmella Haynes, Jessica Polka and Anita Corbett

== Research ==
=== Synthetic Biology ===
Some of Silver's work in this area includes the engineering of: mammalian cells to remember and report past exposures to drugs and radiation, robust computational circuits in embryonic stem cells and bacteria, and synthetic switches to moderate gene silencing with the integration of novel therapeutic proteins. Silver's work sets the stage for the development of novel therapies for use in both humans and animals.

=== Carbon fixation and sustainability ===
Silver has characterized the carboxysome – the major carbon-fixing structure in cyanobacteria – to enhance photosynthetic efficiency and carbon fixation. She has also engineered cyanobacteria to more efficiently cycle carbon into high-value commodities and has shown that these bacteria can form sustainable consortia. In a collaboration with Jessica Polka, Silver performed super-resolution microscopy of the β-carboxysome.

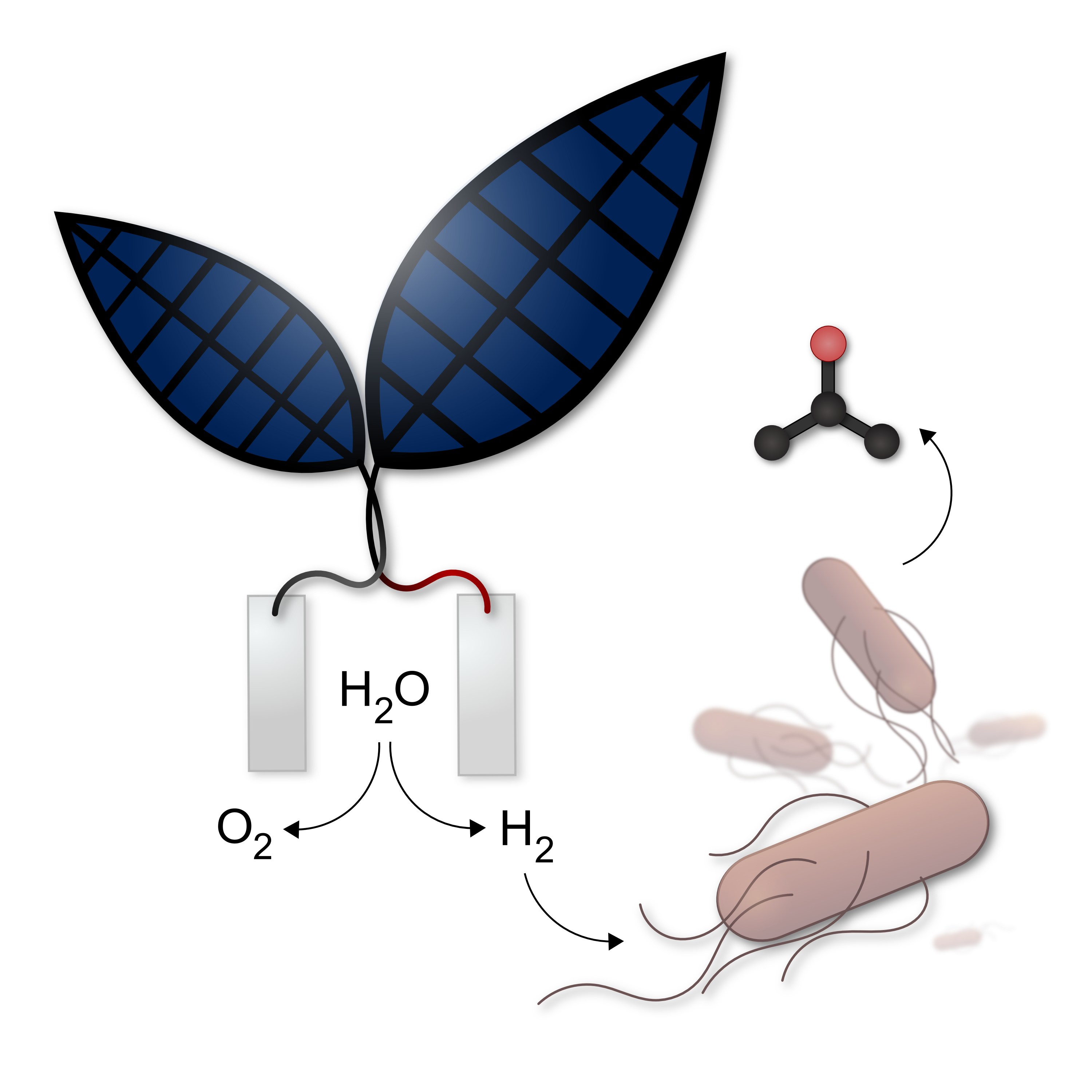
The bionic leaf is a system for converting solar energy into liquid fuel developed by the labs of Daniel Nocera and Pamela Silver at Harvard.

Silver collaborated with Daniel Nocera at Harvard University to develop a device, called the "Bionic Leaf", that converts solar energy into fuel through a hybrid water-splitting catalyst system that leverages metabolically engineered bacteria.

=== Gene regulation ===
Silver discovered a correlation between nuclear transport and gene regulation – she identified the first arginine methyltransferase, which plays a role in chromatin function and is important to the movement of RNA binding proteins between the nucleus and cytoplasm of cells. She also discovered previously unknown variations among ribosomes that led her to propose a unique specificity for the matching between ribosomes and the subsequent translation of mRNAs. Silver's finding has several implications for our understanding of how gene regulation impacts disease development, such as cancer.

== Awards and honors ==
Silver has been the recipient of an NSF Presidential Young Investigator Award, a Basil O’Connor Research Scholar of the March of Dimes, an Established Investigator of the American Heart Association, the NIH Directors Lecture, and NIH MERIT award, Innovation award at BIO, a Fellow of the Radcliffe Institute for Advanced Study, the Elliot T. and Onie H. Adams Professorship at Harvard Medical School and named the Top 20 Global Synthetic Biology Influencers. She sits on numerous advisory boards and has presented to members of the US Congress.

Silver was awarded the BBS Mentoring Award for Graduate Education at Harvard Medical School. She is also one of the founders of the International Genetically Engineered Machines competition (iGEM) and currently sits on the Board of iGEM.org. Silver founded and was the first Director of the Harvard University Graduate Program in Systems Biology. Silver was elected to the American Academy of Arts and Sciences in 2017 and the National Academy of Sciences in 2023.
