= Thomas B. Kornberg =

American biochemist (born 1948)

Thomas Kornberg
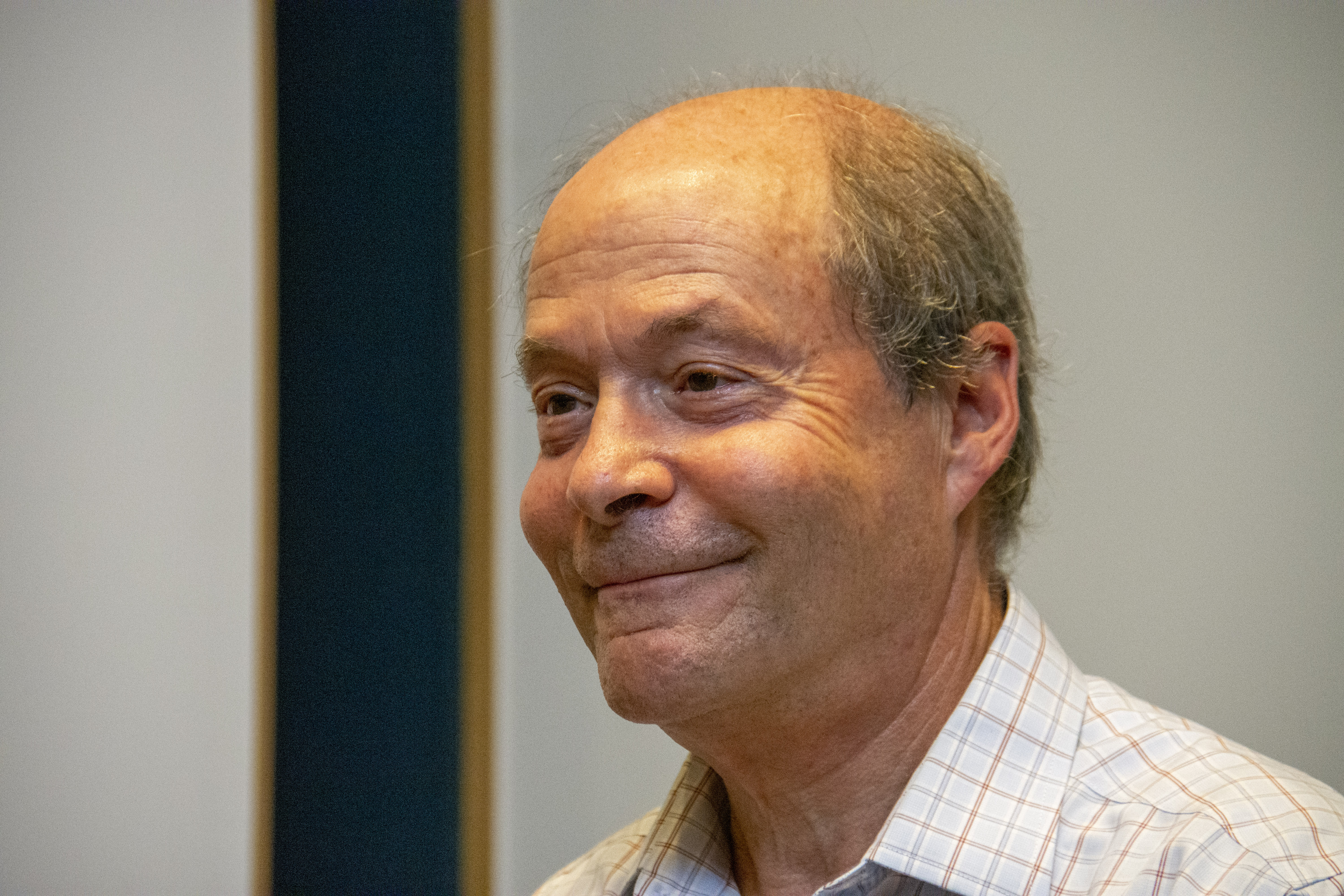
- Thomas B. Kornberg, 2019
- Born: 1948 (age 77–78); Washington D.C., United States
- Education: Columbia College (B.A., 1970, Biology); Columbia University (Ph.D, 1973, Biochemistry)
- Awards: American Cancer Society Career Development Award (1978)
- Scientific career
- Fields: Biochemistry; Biophysics
- Workplaces: University of California, Los Angeles (1976-1977); University of California San Francisco (1986-present)

Thomas Bill Kornberg is an American biochemist who was the first person to purify and characterise DNA polymerase I , DNA polymerase II and DNA polymerase III. He is currently a professor of biochemistry and biophysics at the University of California, San Francisco, and is working on Drosophila melanogaster development.

Kornberg's father was Arthur Kornberg (1918–2007), winner of the 1959 Nobel Prize in Medicine, and his older brother is Roger D. Kornberg (born 1947), winner of the 2006 Nobel Prize in Chemistry. His mother was biochemist Sylvy Kornberg.

== Bibliography ==
- Kornberg T (2002). "Another arrow in the Drosophila quiver". Proc. Natl. Acad. Sci. U.S.A. 99 (15): 9607–8. Bibcode:2002PNAS...99.9607K. doi:10.1073/pnas.172377099. PMC 124942. PMID 12122216.
- Kornberg T (1981). "Engrailed: a gene controlling compartment and segment formation in Drosophila". Proc. Natl. Acad. Sci. U.S.A. 78 (2): 1095–9. Bibcode:1981PNAS...78.1095K. doi:10.1073/pnas.78.2.1095. PMC 319953. PMID 6821526.
