= Christina Agapakis =

American biologist

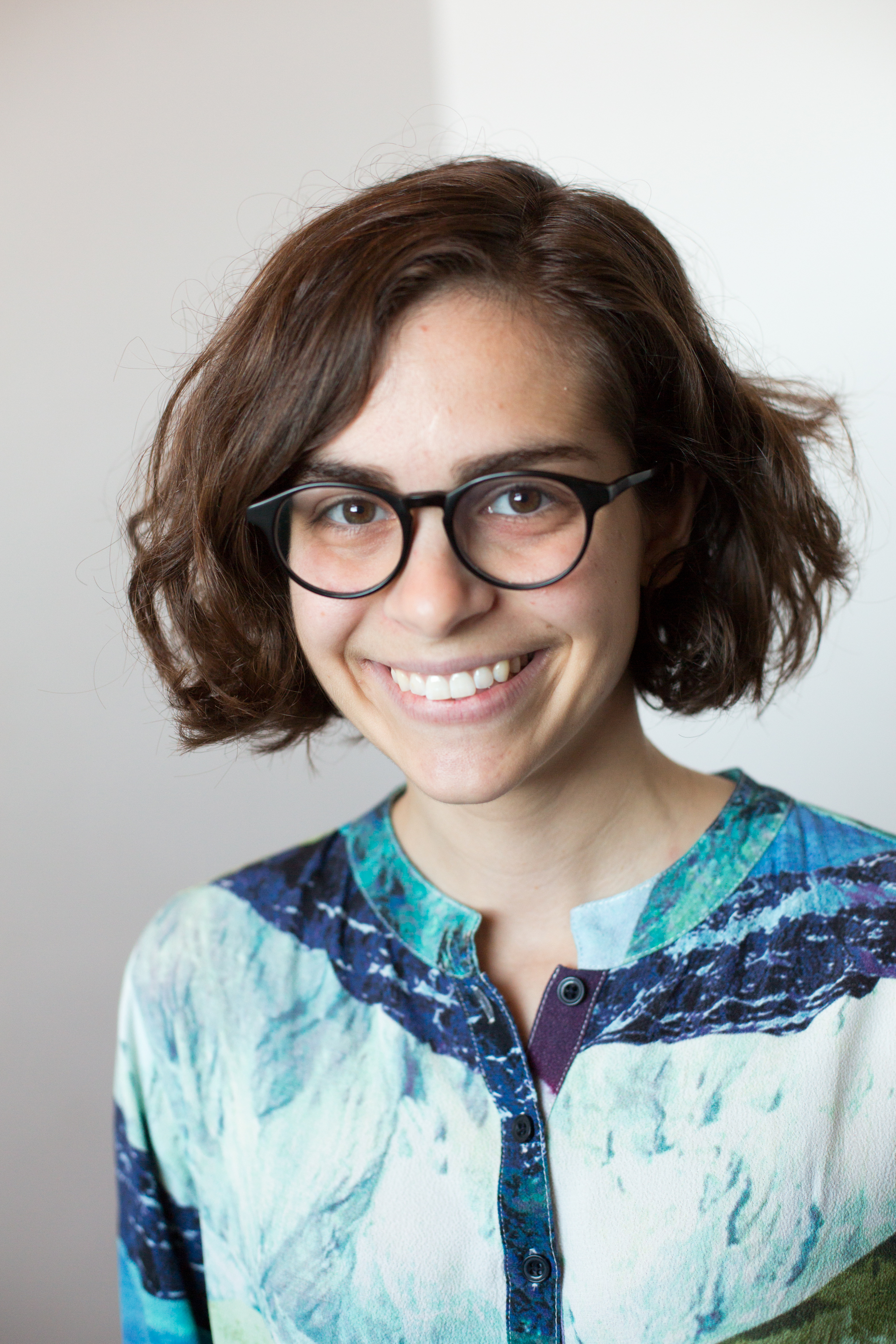
- Christina Agapakis in 2013
- Born: Christina Maria Agapakis
- Education: Yale University (BS); Harvard University (PhD)
- Awards: Forbes 30 Under 30 (2012)
- Scientific career
- Fields: Synthetic biology Bioengineering
- Workplaces: University of California, Los Angeles; Ginkgo Bioworks
- Thesis: Biological Design Principles for Synthetic Biology (2011)
- Doctoral advisor: Pamela Silver
- Website: agapakis.com

Christina Maria Agapakis is a synthetic biologist and science writer. She is the former Creative Director of the biotechnology company Ginkgo Bioworks.

== Education and early life ==
Agapakis received her Bachelor of Science degree in 2006 from Yale University in molecular, cellular, and developmental biology. She then attended Harvard University, where she received her PhD in biological and biomedical sciences under the mentorship of Pamela Silver. Her thesis, on Biological Design Principles for Synthetic Biology, centered on identifying and utilizing design principles for bioengineering, keeping in mind the evolutionary and ecological contexts under which genes and genetic pathways were being modified or newly synthesized.

== Career and research ==
Agapakis worked to engineer photosynthetic bacteria to invade animal cells, essentially giving animals cells chloroplasts, and also engineered bacteria to produce hydrogen fuel. Her thesis covers a range of work she pursued during her doctoral career, including mentoring a Harvard IGEM competition team in 2010, which developed an open source toolkit for plant engineering known as the Harvard iGarden. She also discussed a project called "Selfmade" at the intersection of science and art, which focused on the microbial ecology of cheese and the human body. She worked with artist and odor expert Sissel Tolaas during her Synthetic Aesthetics residency, collecting bacteria samples from the belly buttons, feet, mouths, and tears of creatives to engineer 11 "human cheeses." The project was exhibited at the "Grow Your Own" exhibition at the Dublin Science Gallery and was meant more as a thought experiment than a culinary one.

Following her PhD, Agapakis began a postdoctoral fellowship at the University of California, Los Angeles in the laboratory of Ann Hirsch between 2012 and 2014. While at UCLA, she was also a fellow in the Department of Design and Media Arts at the Art|Sci Center.

=== Bioengineering and bioart ===
Agapakis is now the Creative Director of the Boston-based biotechnology company Ginkgo Bioworks, known as "The Organism Company," which specializes in genetically engineering organisms like yeast and bacteria for a number of applications—from engineering perfumes and food to engineering solutions for more sustainable agriculture. One project, for example, focuses on engineering yeast to produce a rose-like scent by modifying their genes to produce the molecules a rose makes to generate that scent. The rose oil fragrance was licensed to the fragrance maker Robertet. Agapakis has also been leading the company's 100 Vial Project, which is engineering a library of bio-based scents. One of these scents is an effort to resurrect the smell of a long-extinct flower by analyzing preserved botanical samples to identify the DNA encoding smell-producing enzymes. They can then engineer yeast to produce those same enzymes and produce the molecules that create the extinct flower's scent. The project is in collaboration with Agapakis's long-time collaborator Sissel Tolaas and Daisy Ginsberg.

In her role as Creative Director, Agapakis focuses on creating experiences and communicating stories about the bioengineering work the company undertakes with the ultimate goal of making biotechnology more approachable. For instance, Ginkgo hosted designer Natsai Audrey Chieza as artist in residence to experiment with dying textiles with bacteria as an environmentally sound and resource-conservative approach alternative to commercial dyes.

=== Science writing ===
Agapakis is also a science writer. She began blogging in graduate school and in 2011 started a column for Scientific American called the "Oscillator," sharing her thoughts on the latest developments in the field of synthetic biology for a popular audience. Her posts covered a number of topics from sustainability to the intersection between art and science to the microbiology of body fluids. She has also written for a variety of outlets, including highlighting the women who made microbiology possible for Popular Science and reviewing Sophia Roosth's book Synthetic: How life got made for New Scientist. She also co-founded a four-edition print science magazine called Method Quarterly about how science works in practice with science writers Azeen Ghorayshi and Rose Eveleth.

=== Awards and honors ===
- Forbes 30 Under 30, 2012
- L'Oreal USA Fellowship for Women in Science, 2012
- UdK Award for Interdisciplinary Art and Science, 2012
- 100 Most Creative People in Business, Fast Company, 2016
- Next List 2017: 20 People Who Are Creating the Future, Wired, 2017
- Excellence in Public Engagement Award, SynBioBeta, 2018
