= Exopolyphosphatase =

Identifiers
- EC no.: 3.6.1.11
- CAS no.: 9024-85-5

Databases
- IntEnz: IntEnz view
- BRENDA: BRENDA entry
- ExPASy: NiceZyme view
- KEGG: KEGG entry
- MetaCyc: metabolic pathway
- PRIAM: profile
- PDB structures: RCSB PDB PDBe PDBsum
- Gene Ontology: AmiGO / QuickGO
Search
- PMC: articles
- PubMed: articles
- NCBI: proteins

Exopolyphosphatase (PPX) is a phosphatase enzyme which catalyzes the hydrolysis of inorganic polyphosphate, a linear molecule composed of up to 1000 or more monomers linked by phospho-anhydride bonds. PPX is a processive exophosphatase, which means that it begins at the ends of the polyphosphate chain and cleaves the phospho-anhydride bonds to release orthophosphate as it moves along the polyphosphate molecule. PPX has several characteristics which distinguish it from other known polyphosphatases, namely that it does not act on ATP, has a strong preference for long chain polyphosphate, and has a very low affinity for polyphosphate molecules with less than 15 phosphate monomers.

PPX plays an important role in the metabolism of phosphate and energy in all living organisms. It is especially important for maintenance of appropriate levels of intracellular polyphosphate, which has been implicated in a variety of cellular functions including response to stressors such as deficiencies in amino acids, orthophosphate, or nitrogen, changes in pH, nutrient downshift, and high salt, and as an inorganic molecular chaperone.
PPX is classified as a polyphosphatase, which are part of the large DHH phosphoesterase family. Both subfamilies within this super family share four N-terminus motifs but have different C-terminus moieties.

PPX activity is quantified by measuring the loss of radioactively labeled ^{32}P polyphosphate. PPX is mixed with a known quantity of labeled polyphosphate, and the hydrolysis reaction is stopped with perchloric acid (HClO_{4}). The amount of remaining labeled polyphosphate is then measured by liquid scintillation counting.

== History ==
PPX was discovered by the lab of Nobel laureate Arthur Kornberg in 1993 and is part of the polyphosphate operon along with polyphosphate kinase, the enzyme which synthesizes polyphosphate. The Kornberg lab was very interested in polyphosphate and published a series of papers elucidating the metabolism and roles of polyphosphate in vivo. Their interest in polyphosphate led them to identify and characterize the polyphosphate operon (which includes polyphosphate kinase [PPK] and PPX) and develop a wide variety of assays and techniques for quantification of polyphosphate production and degradation, in vitro and in vivo. The structure was further solved for exopolyphosphatase by the Purdue Structural Virology Lab including Sanders, Janicki, et al. The end has 7-10 phosphate atoms. The results of the studies of polyphosphate by the Kornberg lab led Kornberg to speculate that due to its high energy and phosphate content and the degree to which it is conserved across species, polyphosphate may have been the precursor to RNA, DNA, and proteins.

== Structure ==
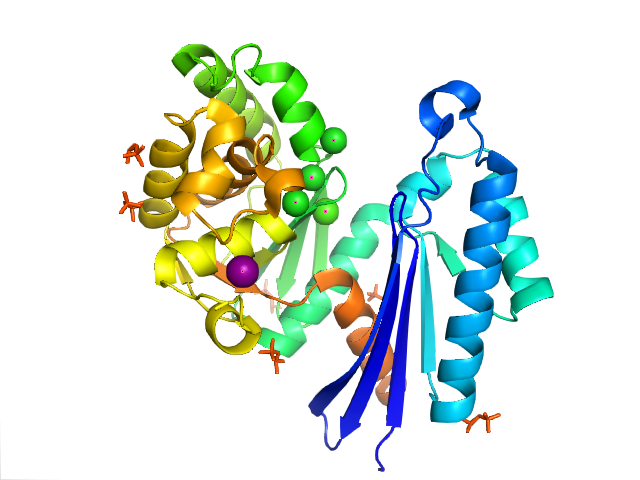
Structural characterization of the Ppx protein family: crystal structure of the Aquifex aeolicus family member. Active site is indicated by the binding of the chlorides (green) and the calcium ion (purple).1T6C

The structure of PPX is characterized by the actin-like ATPase domain that is a part of this superfamily. In Aquifex aeolicus it contains a ribonuclease H-like motif that is made up of a five-stranded β-sheet with the second strand antiparallel to the rest. A few of the strands are connected by helical segments that are longer in the C-terminal domain than in the N-terminal domain. Five alpha-helices are located in the C-terminal domain and only two are located in the N-terminal domain. The closed configuration of the enzyme is referred to as the type I structure. This configuration shares similar features to other members of this superfamily, including the N-terminal and C-terminal domains being separated by two alpha-helices centered on the structure. The more open arrangement of the domains displays rotational movement of the two domains around a single hinge region. The structural flexibility has been described as a "butterfly like" cleft opening around the active site.

In E. coli, exopolyphosphatase exists as a dimer, with each monomer consisting of four domains. The first two domains consist of three beta-sheets followed by an alpha-beta-alpha-beta-alpha fold. This is different from the previously described Aquifex aeolicus homolog which lacks the third and fourth domains. To date, 4 structures have been solved for this class of enzymes, with Protein Data Bank accession codes 1T6C, 1T6D, 1U6Z, and 2FLO.

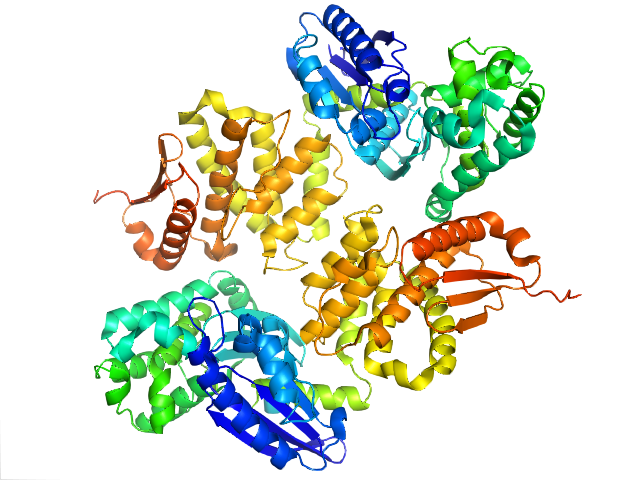
Structure of an E. coli Exopolyphosphatase. 1U6Z

=== Active Site ===
The active site of exopolyphosphatase is located in the clefts between domains I and II. In E. coli, this region contains a loop between strands beta-1 and beta-2 with the amino acids glutamate and aspartate (E121, D143, and E150). These residues, along with K197 are critical for phosphate binding and ion binding which is commonly seen among other ASKHA (acetate and sugar kinases, Hsp70, actin). In A. aeolicus, the active site of the enzyme exists in a cleft between the two domains. It is seen that catalytic carboxyl groups in this cleft are important for the enzyme activity, specifically Asp141 and Glu148. The preference of exopolyphosphatase to bind to polyphosphate and not ATP has been contributed to the clashing that would occur between the ribose and adenosine of ATP and the side chains of N21, C169, and R267.

== Mechanism ==
Exopolyphosphatase cleaves a terminal phosphate off of polyphosphate through the amino acid side chains of glutamate and lysine. Glutamate activates water, allowing it to act as a nucleophile and attack the terminal phosphate. The oxygen that was previously bridging the two phosphate atoms then abstracts a hydrogen from the nearby lysine residue.

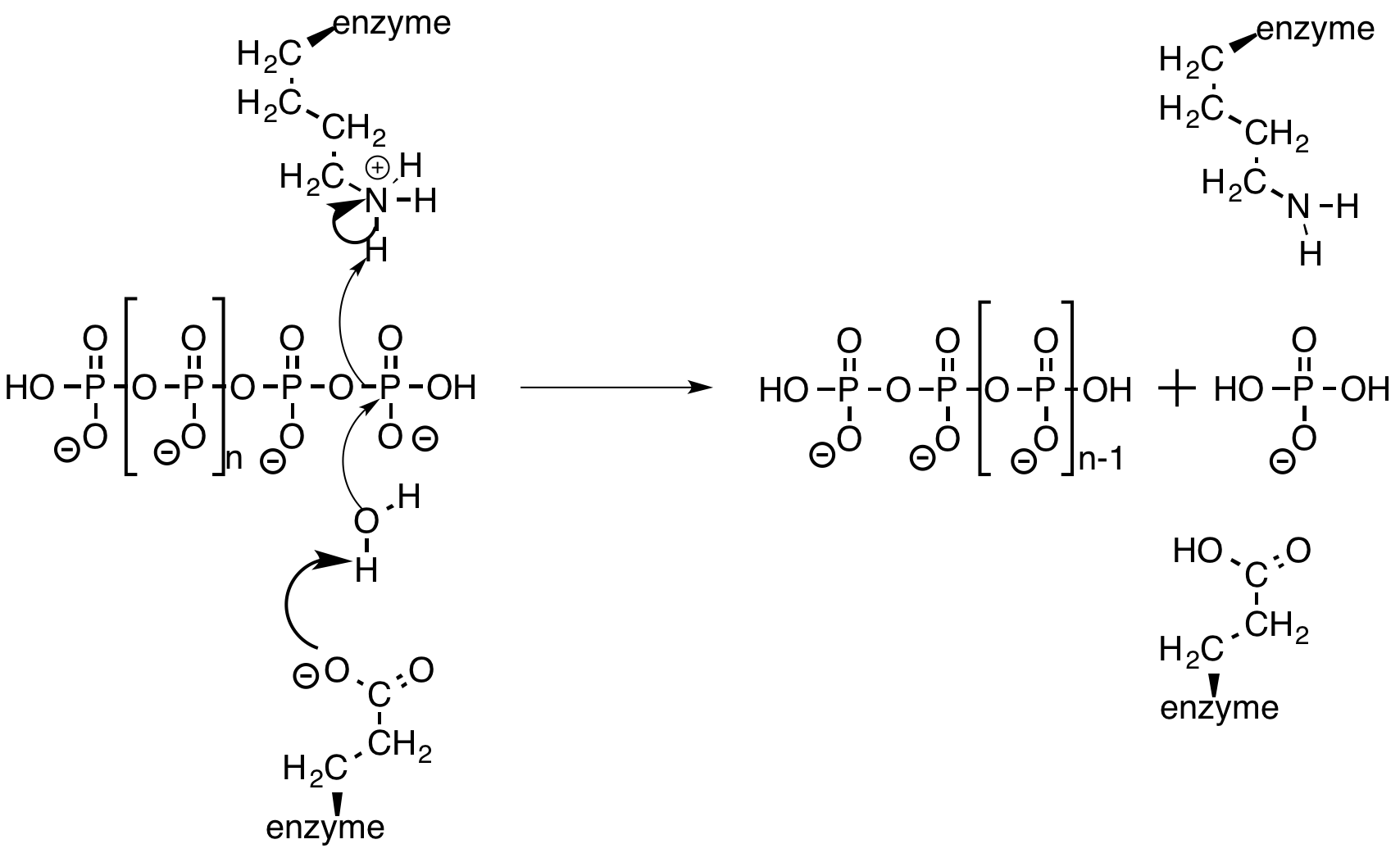

== Function ==
Polyphosphates are utilized by exopolyphosphatase enzymes, which cleave portions of the chain of phosphates. These proteins play an essential role in the metabolism and maintenance of polyphosphates. Polyphosphate is located throughout the cytosol of each cell and is also present in the cell's organelles. There are many classes of exopolyphosphatases, each with their own unique localization and properties. It has been speculated that once the polyphosphates are broken down, they are involved with signaling molecules acting as secondary messengers. In E. coli, the regulation of polyphosphate metabolism is poorly understood.

Polyphosphate is a linear chain of phosphates linked together by phosphoanhydride bonds. Polyphosphate is found in all living organisms and plays an essential role in the organisms survival. In bacteria, polyphosphate is used to store energy to replace adenosine triphosphate. It has also been shown to be involved with cell membrane formation and function, enzyme regulation, and gene transcriptional control. In mammals, polyphosphates are involved with blood coagulation and inflammation, immune response, bone tissue development, and brain function.

It has been shown in a yeast model that mutant yeast deficient in exopolyphosphatase activity had problems in respiration functions and metabolism of inorganic polyphosphates. Conversely, yeast strains that have higher levels exopolyphosphatase enzyme are shown to have no obvious growth defects under phosphate deficiency or excess phosphate conditions, however the level of polyphosphate in the yeast was much lower due to the increased number of enzymes breaking the polyphosphate chains down.

== Potential Clinical/Industrial Relevance ==
E. coli mutants which are unable to synthesize polyphosphate die after only a few days in stationary phase. Strategies to inhibit polyphosphate accumulation in bacteria are therefore of interest as potential antibacterial treatments. This can be accomplished via inhibition of polyphosphate kinase, enhancement of exopolyphosphatase activity, or both.

Polyphosphate accumulation is also of interest for a variety of industrial applications including removal of P_{i} from aquatic environments via enhanced biological phosphorus removal and for its role as a molecular chaperone in expression of recombinant protein. Because of the activity of polyphosphate as a molecular chaperone, strains of E. coli which accumulate polyphosphate could be used to increase yield of soluble recombinant protein.

Recombinant exopolyphosphatase from Saccharomyces cerevisiae protects against mortality and restores protective immune responses in pre-clinical sepsis models.
