= I. Robert Lehman =

American biochemist (1924–2026)

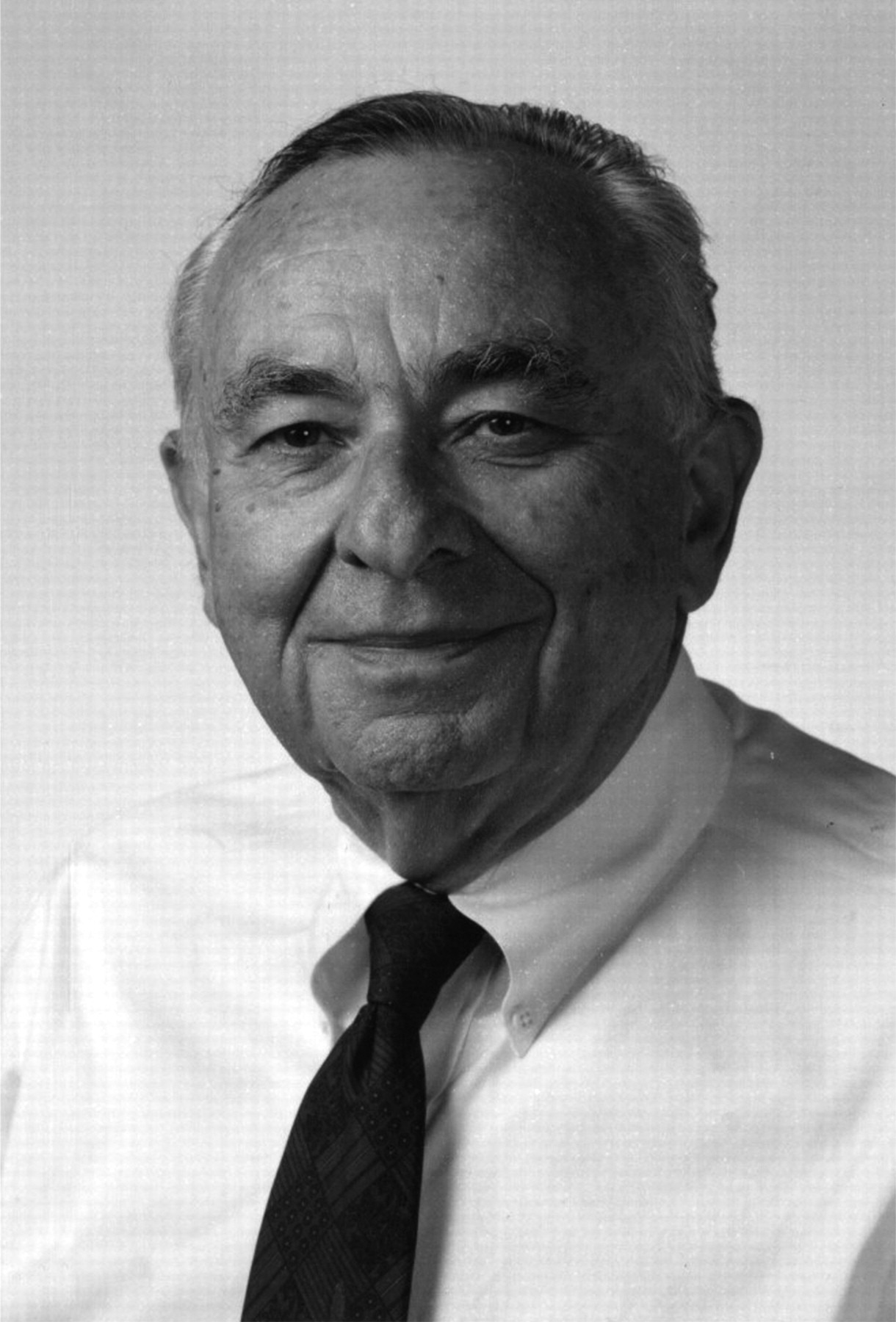
- Born: October 5, 1924; Tauragė, Lithuania
- Died: June 15, 2026 (aged 101)
- Education: Johns Hopkins University
- Occupation: Biochemist
- Employer(s): Washington University in St. Louis; Stanford University

Israel Robert Lehman (October 5, 1924 – June 15, 2026) was a Lithuanian-born American biochemist. His work primarily focused on the study of DNA replication and repair, as well as the replication of phages and the herpes virus. Notably, he collaborated with Arthur Kornberg in the discovery of DNA polymerase and the reaction responsible for genetic material replication. He also made major contributions in characterizing the process of homologous recombination. He served as the head of the Department of Biochemistry at Stanford University from 1974 to 1979 and again from 1984 to 1986. Lehman was awarded the Merk Prize by the American Society for Biochemistry and Molecular Biology.

== Early life and education ==
Lehman was born in Tauragė, Lithuania, on October 5, 1924. He emigrated to United States in 1927. After serving as a soldier during World War II, he was educated at Johns Hopkins University, earning a bachelor's degree in 1950 and completing his Ph.D. in 1954.

Due to the instability of the newly independent Lithuania and the anti-Semitic environment, his father made the decision for the family to emigrate to the United States in search of a better life. At the age of three, in 1927, he arrived in the American continent. He grew up in the city of Baltimore where other members of his family lived, including his uncle Jacob from his maternal side, who was a chemist and whom he greatly admired. As he grew up during the Great Depression, he had to work part-time in a butcher shop while attending Forest Park High School, where he was considered a student with an unremarkable academic record but who enjoyed the field of chemistry.

In 1943, upon turning 18 and completing his graduation, he was drafted into the United States Army and fought during World War II in the Third Infantry Division, participating in the invasion of southern France and later being part of the detachment assigned to the U.S. occupation zone in Bavaria. Due to the traumatic experiences in the war, being one of the 30 survivors out of 200 men in his company, he returned with post-traumatic stress disorder (PTSD) from which he would eventually recover. He received the benefits of the G.I. Bill, a benefit granted to war veterans upon leaving active duty, and decided to enter Johns Hopkins University at the age of 22 to pursue a degree in chemistry and become an industrial chemist, like his uncle. One of the main motivations for his studies was the shared feeling with other veterans of having lost years of their lives to the war.

During his years at Johns Hopkins University, his studies in chemistry were primarily focused on the field of Biochemistry. This was facilitated by the department director, William McElroy, who was also a biochemist and began working in laboratories with cutting-edge equipment for that time, such as pH meters and the Beckman spectrophotometer. As a result, he developed a fascination for the metabolic pathways of carbohydrates, lipids, and energetics, as well as the enzymes responsible for these processes. Due to this interest, he decided to continue his studies by applying to the Ph.D. program in the Department of Biochemistry at the Johns Hopkins School of Public Health and proceeded to work in the laboratory of Roger Herriott, who became his thesis advisor.

During the completion of his thesis, under the guidance of Roger Herriott, they focused on the metabolic changes in Escherichia Coli during the infection of the T2 phage and its protein coat. It is noteworthy that this was the early 1950s when it was not yet firmly established that the molecule responsible for protein coding and conferring genetic characteristics is DNA. He received his Ph.D. in 1954.

Subsequently, he collaborated with Alvin Nason at the McCollum-Pratt Institute at Johns Hopkins University to study the electron transport process. However, the project faced challenges. In the same year, 1954, he attended the Biochemistry Society meeting in New Jersey and witnessed a lecture by Irving Lieberman, a post-doctoral student of Arthur Kornberg, on nucleotide synthesis—the components of DNA and RNA. The content of this presentation left a lasting impact on him as he finally found the area to dedicate himself to. He decided to write to Kornberg expressing his interest in joining his laboratory as a postdoctoral student, and his request was accepted.

== Career ==
=== Discovery of DNA polymerase ===
In 1955, Lehman began working at Washington University School of Medicine in Arthur Kornberg's laboratory on a project aimed at understanding why the DNA of the T2 phage has hydroxymethylcytosine instead of cytosine. During this time, Kornberg showed him an experiment involving carbon-14-labeled thymidine: when exposing this nucleotide to an E. Coli extract, adding ATP, and allowing the mixture to incubate at 37 degrees for an hour, an acid was added, causing the DNA to precipitate. Upon measuring radioactivity, Kornberg observed that the DNA exhibited radioactivity associated with thymidine, and if deoxyribonuclease, an enzyme that degrades DNA was added, this label disappeared from the precipitate. This experiment motivated Lehman to join Arthur's team to identify the enzyme responsible for synthesizing DNA from nucleotides.

During his time in St. Louis, Lehman developed strong bonds of friendship with the rest of the team, including Ernie Simms, Maurice Bessman, and Kornberg. Several scientific publications titled "Enzymatic Synthesis of Deoxyribonucleic Acid" were published in the years 1957 and 1958 in the "Journal of Biological Chemistry". Thanks to this work, Kornberg was awarded the Nobel Prize in Physiology or Medicine.

It was also during his work in St. Louis that he would meet his future wife, Sandra.

=== Investigation at Stanford University ===
In 1957, Kornberg was offered a position at Stanford University School of Medicine. After coordinating the establishment of the Biochemistry department and settling in California in 1959, much of his former team followed him, including Lehman, who had already spent four years as a postdoctoral student. In the same year, he married Sandra, and they moved to California in July 1959.

Lehman was appointed an associate professor at Stanford, and shortly thereafter, they welcomed their first child. He resumed his research and organized the classes they were to teach at the university, including molecular biology courses. Years later, he would be appointed the head of the Biochemistry department at Stanford, serving from 1974 to 1979 and again from 1984 to 1986. He also became a reviewer for scientific journals such as the Journal of Biological Chemistry and Proceedings of the National Academy of Sciences.

Seeking some distance from Kornberg to work independently and away from DNA polymerase, Lehman shifted his focus to exonuclease 1. He was among the first to identify and purify it, and it would later be widely used in numerous experiments for DNA purification because only degraded single-stranded DNA. Afterward, he redirected his research toward another enzyme, DNA ligase, which is involved in DNA replication, recombination, and repair processes. Lehman was one of the pioneers in studying and purifying this enzyme. During those years, he collaborated with individuals like Paul Modrich, who was his postdoctoral student at the time and later won the Nobel Prize for his work in DNA repair.

Another significant area of active research was the study of DNA replication in eukaryotes, where the first evidence was obtained that eukaryotic DNA polymerase is composed of subunits with specific functions. Lehman also distinguished himself in the investigation of the RecA enzyme, which plays a role in homologous recombination for DNA repair.

Finally, he worked on studying herpes simplex virus type 1, where they were able to artificially reconstruct the virus. His focus was on understanding how the virus replicates its genetic material in the cell and how the state of latency develops in the virus—essentially, what keeps the virus present without causing disease until a specific moment. Lehman continued working on the herpes virus until his retirement. His last project was taken over by his final postdoctoral student but had to be abandoned due to a lack of funding.

When Arthur Kornberg died in 2007, Lehman published articles as a dedication expressing his appreciation towards him. Lehman's professional career concluded with the completion of 216 publications, but he remained active. He was part of the review teams for scientific journals such as the Journal of Biological Chemistry and Proceedings of the National Academy of Sciences. He also advised several former students who visited him, sharing their latest data, allowing him to stay updated with the latest publications.

== Death ==
Lehman died on June 15, 2026, at the age of 101.
