= Joseph G. Gall =

American cell biologist (1928–2024)

Joseph Grafton Gall
- Born: April 14, 1928
- Died: September 12, 2024 (aged 96); Baltimore, Maryland, U.S.
- Education: Yale University
- Known for: Chromosome and nuclear structure determination
- Awards: E.B. Wilson Medal (1983); Lasker Award (2006); Louisa Gross Horwitz Prize (2007)
- Scientific career
- Fields: Cell biology
- Workplaces: Carnegie Institution, Yale University
- Doctoral advisor: Donald Poulson
- Notable students: Mary-Lou Pardue; Ginger Zakian; Joan A. Steitz

Joseph Grafton Gall (April 14, 1928 – September 12, 2024) was an American cell biologist whose studies revealed many details of chromosome structure and function. Gall's studies were greatly facilitated by his knowledge of many different organisms because he could select the most favorable organism to study when approaching a specific question about nuclear structure. He was awarded the 2006 Albert Lasker Special Achievement Award. He was also a co-recipient (with Elizabeth Blackburn and Carol W. Greider) of the 2007 Louisa Gross Horwitz Prize from Columbia University. In 1983 he was honored with the highest recognition of the American Society for Cell Biology, the E. B. Wilson Medal, and in 2004 was awarded the Lifetime Achievement Award from the Society for Developmental Biology. He had been elected to the American Academy of Arts and Sciences in 1968, the National Academy of Sciences in 1972, and the American Philosophical Society in 1989.

== Research career ==
Gall was called "the father of cell biology" in his citation for the Lasker award. Gall was a major contributor to the theory that a chromosome contained one DNA molecule running from one end to the other. In chromosomes after DNA replication, each of the two daughter chromatids had one DNA molecule running its length. He revealed this structure by examining amphibian lampbrush chromosomes in the microscope after staining for DNA and for RNA and also after treatment with enzymes that break down DNA or RNA. Although the Feulgen stain for DNA was not sensitive enough to stain the DNA in the loops of these chromosomes, but only stained the long axis of the structure, the loops were sensitive to DNase so they must contain DNA that maintained their loop structure. Later, staining with DAPI, a more sensitive dye, revealed the DNA running through each loop and then returning to the axis of the chromosome. He also unveiled the structure and location of the rDNA, the part of the genome that specifies the ribosomal RNA and made many more important discoveries about nuclear structure.

Gall and then-graduate student Mary-Lou Pardue wanted to find out where in the chromosomes a distinctive highly repeated DNA sequence called satellite DNA occurred. To show the location of this special DNA, they developed the widely used laboratory technique known as in situ hybridization. Using this method, they found that satellite DNA occurred at the ends or telomeres of the chromosomes.

When Elizabeth Blackburn, 2009 Nobel laureate in Medicine, worked with Gall they analyzed the ends of chromosomes and identified the major short repeated sequence that occurs in telomeres of most higher organisms. Blackburn and her student Carol Greider later discovered the enzyme telomerase that maintains the lengths of the protective telomeric sequences and identified its role in aging.

== Role as a mentor of women scientists ==
Gall is credited with encouraging women biologists, a group sometimes called "Gall's Gals", in an era when this was relatively uncommon. A number of his former students have been elected to the National Academy of Sciences and won major research prizes including the Nobel Prize. His students have included Joan Argetsinger Steitz, Mary-Lou Pardue, and Elizabeth Blackburn.

One of his students who went on to do important work in cytology is Susan Gerbi. She co-wrote an article about Gall's life and work in 2003. In her conversations with Gall, when asked to explain his encouragement of women in the sciences, he spoke about his mother. Gifted in math and science, she had been the first woman in her family to attend college, graduating in the 1920s. She became a homemaker, not a scientist. But she urged a young Joseph Gall to explore the natural world, encouraging him to catch bugs and bring them into the house so together they could identify the creatures using scientific reference books. "It never occurred to me that a woman's aptitude was different than a man's," Gall said. "My father -- a lawyer -- was afraid of animals and insects. So, if anything, maybe I thought it went the other way."

== Death and legacy ==
In 2005, Gall was featured in a series of interviews with well-known television personality, Bill Nye, for the Science Channel's 100 Greatest Discoveries series.

Gall died at his home in Baltimore on September 12, 2024, at the age of 96.

== Awards ==
- National Academy of Sciences, 1972
- EB Wilson Award, 1983
- Lifetime Achievement Award, Society for Developmental Biology, 2004
- Lasker Award, 2006
- Louisa Gross Horwitz Prize (Columbia University), 2007
