= Karmella Haynes =

American biomedical engineer

- Born: St. Louis, Missouri, U.S.
- Education: Washington University in St. Louis Ph.D (2006); Florida A&M University B.S. (1999)
- Known for: Chromatin, Synthetic Biology, Epigenetics, Cancer
- Awards: 2013 Scientists to Watch, The Scientist (magazine); 2009 Ruth L. Kirschstein National Research Service Award, National Institutes of Health; 2008 Outstanding Publication of 2008, Journal of Biological Engineering; 2006 Silen Award, New England Science Symposium
- Scientific career
- Workplaces: Emory University/Georgia Tech (2018 - current); Arizona State University (2011 - 2018); Harvard Medical School (2008 - 2011); Davidson College (2006 - 2008)
- Thesis: (2006)
- Doctoral advisor: Sarah Elgin
- Website: khayneslab.wordpress.com

Karmella Ann Haynes is an American biomedical engineer and associate professor at the Wallace H. Coulter Department of Biomedical Engineering, Georgia Institute of Technology and Emory University. She researches how chromatin is used to control cell development in biological tissue.

== Early life and education ==
Haynes was born and raised in St. Louis. She received her B.S. in biology from Florida A&M University (where she had received a full scholarship) in 1999 . While at Florida A&M, she participated in a summer research program working with Mary-Lou Pardue at Massachusetts Institute of Technology as part of the MIT Summer Research Program.

Haynes did her graduate work in the lab of Sarah Elgin at Washington University in St. Louis. She received her Ph.D. in molecular genetics in 2006 for her work studying chromatin dynamics and epigenetics in Drosophila.

As a Howard Hughes Medical Institute fellow, she completed her first postdoctoral fellowship in teaching at Davidson College under the guidance of Laurie Heyer and Malcolm Campbell. During her time as a fellow, Haynes redesigned the undergraduate bioinformatics teaching course and won publication of the year from the Journal of Biological Engineering for her article Engineering bacteria to solve the Burnt Pancake Problem. She was introduced to synthetic biology and became a member of Davidson's 2006 iGEM team.

Haynes went on to complete a second postdoctoral fellowship in Pamela Silver's lab at Harvard Medical School where she created artificial transcription factors which activated genes based on histone methylation.

== Academic career and research ==
After her postdoctoral fellowships in 2011, Haynes started her lab in the School of Biological and Health Systems Engineering at Arizona State University (ASU). There, her lab focused on creating epigenetic machinery that can regulate DNA. The proteins themselves are fusion transcription factors, which can target particular genes. She hopes to increase the use of technology in therapeutics, working on tissue regeneration and customizable protein-based drugs. In 2015 she was awarded a K01 grant to study the use of modular peptide motifs to build synthetic chromatin proteins that activate dormant therapeutic genes. During her time at ASU, she was the faculty advisor for the ASU iGEM team.

In 2018, Haynes moved to the W.H. Coulter Biomedical Engineering Department at Georgia Tech/Emory University. During her time here, she founded the AfroBiotech conference and the Cold Spring Harbor Summer Course on Synthetic Biology. She was on the responsible conduct committee for IGEM in 2018 and 2019.

== Public engagement ==
Haynes has appeared on PBS, talking about biotechnology and disease. Alongside research, Haynes is an accomplished artist. In 2011, she painted her poster presentation for the Fifth International Meeting of Synthetic Biology (SB5.0) conference. Her artwork is still on the walls at Harvard University. She is a member of the Building with Biology public engagement project. She has been featured twice on Science Friday.

== Awards and honors ==
- 2017 Outstanding Assistant Professor, School of Biological and Health Systems Engineering
- 2013 Scientists to Watch, The Scientist Magazine
- 2012 Fellow, Synthetic Biology Leadership Excellence Accelerator Program (SynBio LEAP)
- 2012 Gold Medal and Human Practices Award, International Genetically Engineered Machines Competition (iGEM)
- 2010 Gold Medal, International Genetically Engineered Machines Competition (iGEM)
- 2010 Sustainability Grant, Harvard University
- 2009 Ruth L. Kirschstein National Research Service Award, National Institutes of Health
- 2008 Outstanding Publication of 2008, Journal of Biological Engineering (JBE)

== Professional memberships ==
- Director of Engineering Biology Research Consortium (ERBC)
- SynBioLEAP alum
- iGEM Advisor and Judge Emeritus
- AIChE

== Notable papers ==
As of August 16, 2020 based on Google Scholar citations:

- cis-Acting determinants of heterochromatin formation on Drosophila melanogaster chromosome four (111 citations)
- Preparing synthetic biology for the world (97 citations)
- Element 1360 and RNAi components contribute to HP1-dependent silencing of a pericentric reporter (94 citations)
- The impact of chromatin dynamics on Cas9-mediated genome editing in human cells (82 citations)
- Engineering bacteria to solve the Burnt Pancake Problem (73 citations)
- Synthetic reversal of epigenetic silencing (51 citations)
- Eukaryotic systems broaden the scope of synthetic biology (51 citations)

== See also ==
- Synthetic biology
- Epigenetics
- Chromatin
- Gene regulation
- Genetic engineering
- Biomedical engineering
- Genome editing
- International Genetically Engineered Machine
- Cancer epigenetics
