= Mary-Lou Pardue =

American geneticist (1933–2024)

- Born: September 15, 1933; Lexington, Kentucky, U.S.
- Died: June 1, 2024 (aged 90)
- Education: College of William and Mary; University of Tennessee; Yale University
- Known for: Study of Drosophila telomeres
- Scientific career
- Fields: Genetics, cell biology
- Workplaces: Massachusetts Institute of Technology
- Thesis: (1970)
- Doctoral advisor: Joseph Gall
- Notable students: Karmella Haynes; Thomas Cech

Mary-Lou Pardue (September 15, 1933 – June 1, 2024) was an American geneticist and professor emerita in the Department of Biology at the Massachusetts Institute of Technology, where she originally joined in 1972. Her research focused on the role of telomeres in chromosome replication, particularly in Drosophila (fruit flies). Pardue died on June 1, 2024, at the age of 90.

== Early life and education ==
Pardue was born in Lexington, Kentucky on September 15, 1933. She received a bachelor's degree in biology in 1955 from the College of William and Mary. Pardue received a master's degree in radiation biology in 1959 from the University of Tennessee, where she had been eligible for a Ph.D. but convinced the department to give her the master's degree instead, later explaining in an interview that "in the society I was in it was quite all right for a wife to be going to school, but getting a Ph.D. was a little too serious". She subsequently worked for several years as a research technician at Oak Ridge National Laboratory before returning to graduate school in 1965 at Yale University, from which she received a Ph.D. in biology in 1970. She worked under the supervision of Joseph Gall, whose support of women in his research laboratory was considered highly unusual at the time. Pardue then became a postdoctoral fellow with Max Birnstiel at the University of Edinburgh.

== Academic career ==
As Pardue later described the process, her search for a faculty position in the early 1970s coincided with broad interest in United States academic institutions in hiring women, and she was surprised to be heavily recruited. After initially being rejected by MIT, she was subsequently offered an associate professor position there and accepted it in part because other offers were for more junior assistant professor positions, and in part because the department already had other women faculty. She became a full professor in the department in 1980. In 1995, Pardue became the first Boris Magasanik Professor of Biology. Pardue was among the women faculty who organized with fellow MIT biologist Nancy Hopkins in the mid-1990s to bring complaints of institutional discrimination against women faculty to then-President Charles Vest. In 1994, Pardue was one of 16 women faculty in the School of Science at MIT who drafted and co-signed a letter to the then-Dean of Science (now Chancellor of Berkeley) Robert Birgeneau, which started a campaign to highlight and challenge gender discrimination at MIT.

Pardue became a fellow of the American Association for the Advancement of Science in 1978, a member of the United States National Academy of Sciences in 1983 and a fellow of the American Academy of Arts and Sciences in 1985. She served as the president of the Genetics Society of America in 1982–1983 and of the American Society for Cell Biology in 1985–1986.

== Research ==
Pardue's work with Gall on developing the technique of in situ hybridization had been highly influential. Work in her research group at MIT focused on telomeres in the chromosomes of the model organism Drosophila (fruit flies), with particular interest in the retrotransposon elements that maintain Drosophila telomeres, unlike many other organisms in which the enzyme telomerase performs much the same function. Her work is believed to be evolutionarily related to telomerase-generated telomeres, which highlights the theory that parasitic transposable elements could have possibly evolved from mechanisms in the cell that exist to maintain chromosomal health. Pardue's 1969 publication entitled Molecular hybridization of radioactive DNA to the DNA of cytological preparations, focused on the radioactive DNA localization in the nuclei of ovarian cells in Xenopus. Through her work, she was able to conclude that the localization of binding in the oocytes of Xenopus is specific. Pardue also found that hybridization reactions with radioactive DNA were able to discriminate between different types of DNA.

Pardue died on June 1, 2024, at the age of 90.
