= Trends in Cell Biology =

- Language: English

Publication details
- Publisher: Elsevier (United Kingdom)
- Impact factor: 25.3 (2025)

Standard abbreviations
- ISO 4: Trends Cell Biol.

Indexing
- ISSN: 1879-3088

Links
- Journal homepage

Trends in Cell Biology is a peer-reviewed scientific journal by Elsevier BV.

== Abstracting and indexing ==
Trends in Cell Biology is abstracted and indexed the following bibliographic databases:

- Science Citation Index Expanded
- Scopus

According to the Journal Citation Reports, the journal has a 2025 impact factor of 25.3.
