= Transposition (birth defect) =

Group of congenital defects

Transposition is a group of congenital defects involving an abnormal spatial arrangement of tissue or organ.

== Examples ==
- Transposition of the great vessels, cardiac transposition, a congenital heart defect with malformation of any of the major vessels
- Transposition of teeth
- Penoscrotal transposition
