= Neil Osheroff =

Professor of Biochemistry at Vanderbilt University

- Occupations: Professor, Biochemist
- Awards: Distinguished Career Award (2019); Mentoring, Innovation, and Leadership in Educational Scholarship Award (2023); Carl Brädén Award (2026)

Academic background
- Education: Hobart College (BA); Northwestern University (PhD)

Academic work
- Discipline: Biochemistry, Hematology, Oncology
- Sub-discipline: Molecular biology, Enzymology
- Institutions: Vanderbilt University School of Medicine, Vanderbilt Institute of Chemical Biology
- Main interests: Type II topoisomerases affecting DNA

Neil Osheroff is an American biochemist who is the John G. Coniglio Chair in Biochemistry, Professor of Biochemistry, and Professor of Medicine (Hematology/Oncology) at Vanderbilt University School of Medicine. He is also a member with the Vanderbilt Institute of Chemical Biology.

== Early life and education ==
Osheroff earned a Bachelor's of Arts degree in chemistry in 1974 from Hobart College and a Ph.D. in biochemistry and molecular biology from Northwestern University in 1979. And he was a Helen Hay Whitney Foundation Fellow at the Stanford University School of Medicine in 1983.

== Career ==
Osheroff joined Vanderbilt University in 1983 as an assistant professor in the Department of Biochemistry. He currently serves as John G. Coniglio Chair in Biochemistry, Professor of Biochemistry, and Professor of Medicine.

He is the Past-Director of Academy for Excellence in Education, and Co-Leader of Foundations of Medical Knowledge.

== Research ==
His laboratory studies how type II topoisomerases alters DNA structure. These studies help his lab design agents to treat a variety of cancers and bacterial infestions.

His group's research spans over research areas such as enzymology, anti-cancer drugs and chemopreventative compounds, and antibacterial drug resistance.

== Honors and awards ==
Osheroff is an elected fellow of the 2018 American Association for the Advancement of Science, and the 2024 Australia and New Zealand Academy of Health Professional Educators. He has been awarded the 2019 Distinguished Career Award for Excellence in Teaching and Educational Scholarship from the International Association of Medical Science Educators, the 2023 Mentoring, Innovation, and Leadership in Educational Scholarship Award from the Asia Pacific Medical Education Conference and the 2026 Carl Brädén Award from the Protein Society.

== Selected publications ==
- Osheroff, Neil (1989). "Effect of antineoplastic agents on the DNA cleavage/religation reaction of eukaryotic topoisomerase II: inhibition of DNA religation by etoposide". Biochemistry. 28 (15): 6157–6160. doi:10.1021/bi00441a005. PMID 2551366.
- Deweese, Joseph E.; Osheroff, Neil (2009). "The DNA cleavage reaction of topoisomerase II: wolf in sheep's clothing". Nucleic Acids Research. 37 (3): 738–748. doi:10.1093/nar/gkn937. PMID 19042970. PMC 2647315.
- Aldred, Katie J.; McPherson, Sylvia A.; Turnbough, Charles L. Jr.; Kerns, Robert J.; Osheroff, Neil (2013). "Topoisomerase IV-quinolone interactions are mediated through a water-metal ion bridge: mechanistic basis of quinolone resistance". Nucleic Acids Research. 41 (8): 4628–4639. doi:10.1093/nar/gkt124. PMID 23460203. PMC 3632122.
- Aldred, Katie J.; Kerns, Robert J.; Osheroff, Neil (2014). "Mechanism of quinolone action and resistance". Biochemistry. 53 (10): 1565–1574. doi:10.1021/bi5000564. PMID 24576155. PMC 3985860.
- Gibson, Elizabeth G.; Bax, Ben; Chan, Pan F.; Osheroff, Neil (2019). "Mechanistic and structural basis for the actions of the antibacterial gepotidacin against Staphylococcus aureus gyrase". ACS Infectious Diseases. 5 (4): 570–581. doi:10.1021/acsinfecdis.8b00315. PMID 30757898. PMC 6461504.
- Collins, Jessica A.; Osheroff, Neil (2024). "Gyrase and topoisomerase IV: recycling old targets for new antibacterials to combat fluoroquinolone resistance". ACS Infectious Diseases. 10 (4): 1097–1115. doi:10.1021/acsinfecdis.4c00128. PMID 38564341. PMC 11019561.
