= Gail Mandel =

Biologist

Gail Mandel was a senior scientist at the Vollum Institute, beginning in 2006, and a professor in the Department of Biochemistry and Molecular Biology at Oregon Health & Science University. From 1997 to 2016 she was an investigator with Howard Hughes Medical Institute. In 2008 she was elected a member of the National Academy of Sciences.

Research in the Mandel Lab is focused on understanding how neuronal cell identity is established and maintained. Most recently, the lab uncovered a role for glia in inducing neuronal dysfunction in Rett syndrome, one of the most common causes of intellectual disability in young girls.
