= Endopolyphosphatase =

Class of enzymes

endopolyphosphatase

Identifiers
- EC no.: 3.6.1.10
- CAS no.: 9024-86-6

Databases
- IntEnz: IntEnz view
- BRENDA: BRENDA entry
- ExPASy: NiceZyme view
- KEGG: KEGG entry
- MetaCyc: metabolic pathway
- PRIAM: profile
- PDB structures: RCSB PDB PDBe PDBsum
- Gene Ontology: AmiGO / QuickGO
Search
- PMC: articles
- PubMed: articles
- NCBI: proteins

In enzymology, an endopolyphosphatase (EC 3.6.1.10) is an enzyme that catalyzes the chemical reaction

polyphosphate + n H_{2}O $\rightleftharpoons$ (n^{+}1) oligophosphate

Thus, the two substrates of this enzyme are polyphosphate and H_{2}O, whereas its product is oligophosphate.

This enzyme belongs to the family of hydrolases, specifically those acting on acid anhydrides in phosphorus-containing anhydrides. The systematic name of this enzyme class is polyphosphate polyphosphohydrolase. Other names in common use include polyphosphate depolymerase, metaphosphatase, polyphosphatase, and polymetaphosphatase.
