= Roger D. Kornberg =

American biochemist and professor of structural biology

Roger Kornberg ForMemRS
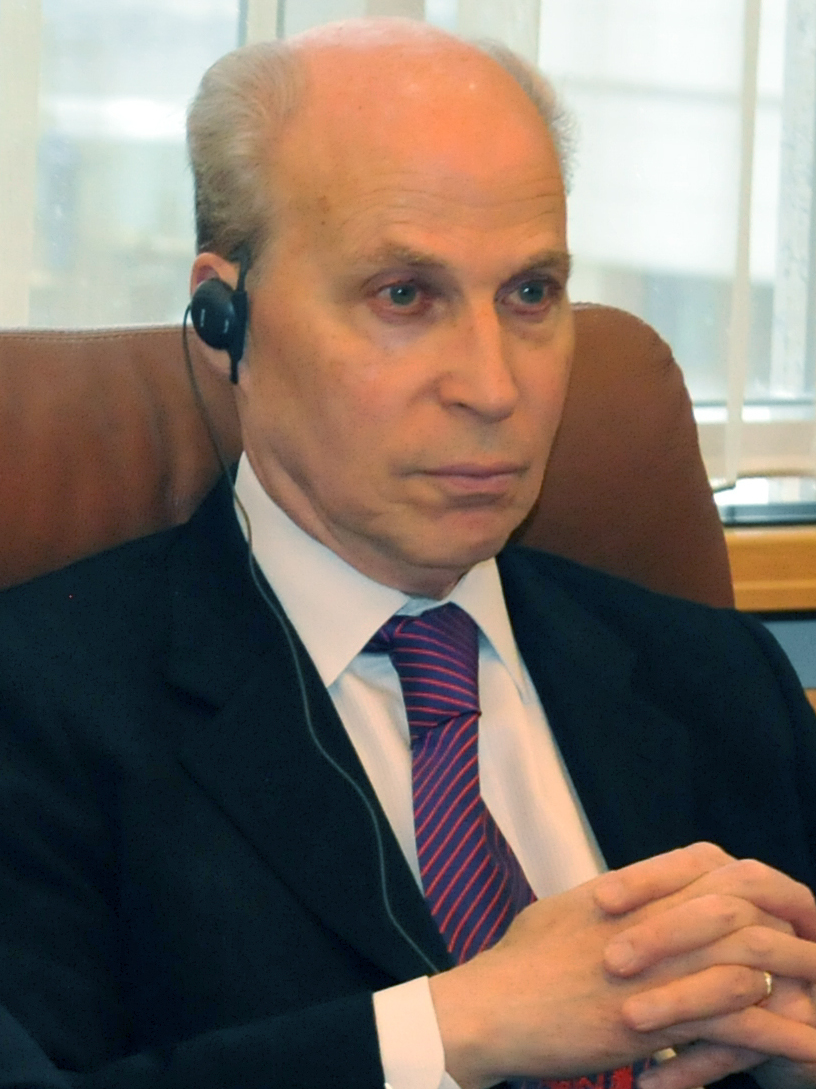
- Kornberg in 2016
- Born: April 24, 1947 (age 79); St. Louis, Missouri, U.S.
- Education: Harvard University (BS); Stanford University (PhD)
- Known for: Transmission of genetic information from DNA to RNA
- Spouse: Yahli Lorch
- Children: 3
- Awards: Nobel Prize in Chemistry (2006); Louisa Gross Horwitz Prize (2006); Alfred P. Sloan, Jr. Prize (2005); Gairdner Award (2000); Harvey Prize (1997); Ciba-Drew Award (1990)
- Scientific career
- Fields: Structural biology
- Workplaces: Stanford University; Harvard Medical School; Hebrew University of Jerusalem; Laboratory of Molecular Biology
- Thesis: The Diffusion of Phospholipids in Membranes (1972)
- Doctoral advisor: Harden M. McConnell
- Website: kornberg.stanford.edu

Signature
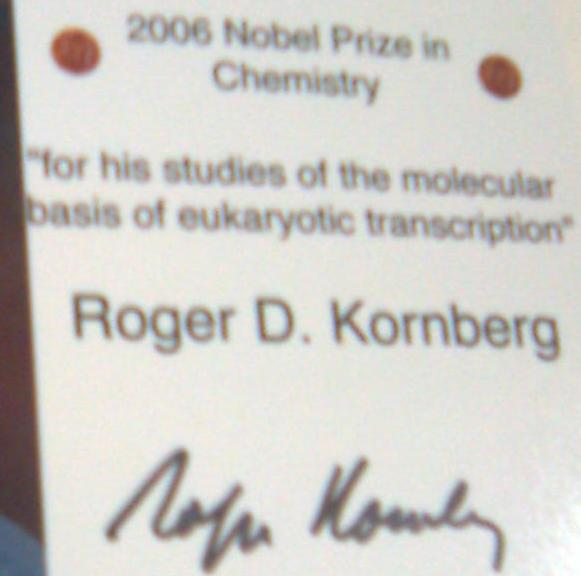

Roger David Kornberg (born April 24, 1947) is an American biochemist and professor of structural biology at Stanford University School of Medicine. Kornberg was awarded the Nobel Prize in Chemistry in 2006 for his studies of the process by which genetic information from DNA is copied to RNA, "the molecular basis of eukaryotic transcription."

== Early life and education ==
Kornberg was born in St. Louis, Missouri, into a Jewish family, the eldest son of biochemist Arthur Kornberg, who won the Nobel Prize, and Sylvy Kornberg who was also a biochemist. He earned his bachelor's degree in chemistry from Harvard University in 1967 and his Ph.D. in chemical physics from Stanford in 1972 supervised by Harden M. McConnell.

== Career ==
Kornberg became a postdoctoral research fellow at the Laboratory of Molecular Biology in Cambridge, England and then an Assistant Professor of Biological Chemistry at Harvard Medical School in 1976, before moving to his present position as Professor of Structural Biology at Stanford Medical School in 1978. From 2004-2026, Kornberg was the editor of the Annual Review of Biochemistry. He serves on the Board of Directors of Annual Reviews.

== Research ==
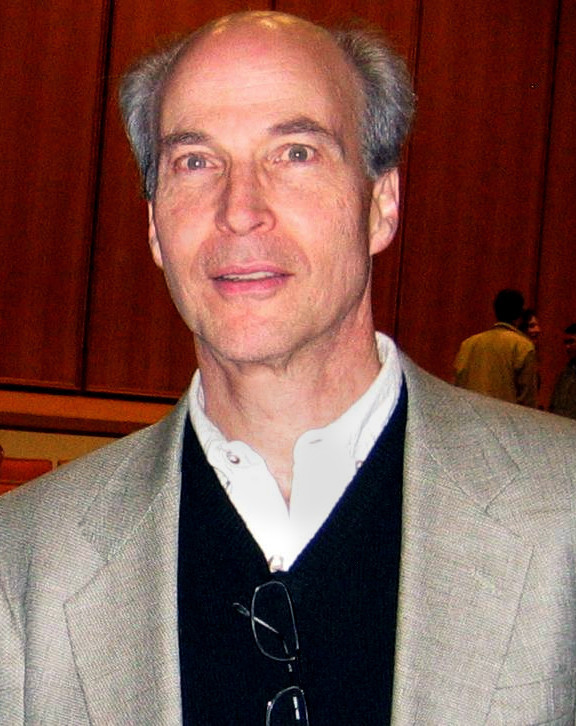
Kornberg in 2006

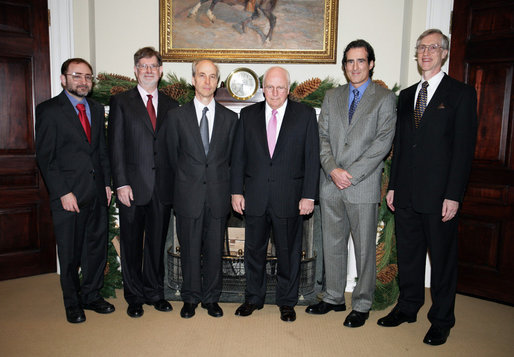
Roger D. Kornberg (third from left) with Andrew Fire, George Smoot, Dick Cheney, Craig Mello and John C. Mather

Kornberg identified the role of RNA polymerase II and other proteins in DNA transcription, creating three-dimensional images of the protein cluster using X-ray crystallography.

Kornberg and his research group have made several fundamental discoveries concerning the mechanisms and regulation of eukaryotic transcription. While a graduate student working with Harden McConnell at Stanford in the late 1960s, he discovered the "flip-flop" and lateral diffusion of phospholipids in bilayer membranes. Meanwhile, as a postdoctoral fellow working with Aaron Klug and Francis Crick at the MRC in the 1970s, Kornberg discovered the nucleosome as the basic protein complex packaging chromosomal DNA in the nucleus of eukaryotic cells (chromosomal DNA is often termed "chromatin" when it is bound to proteins in this manner). Within the nucleosome, Kornberg found that roughly 200 bp of DNA are wrapped around an octamer of histone proteins. With Yahli Lorch, Kornberg showed that a nucleosome on a promoter prevents the initiation of transcription, leading to the recognition of a functional role for the nucleosome, which serves as a general gene repressor.

Kornberg's research group at Stanford later succeeded in the development of a faithful transcription system from baker's yeast, a simple unicellular eukaryote, which they then used to isolate in a purified form all of the several dozen proteins required for the transcription process. Through the work of Kornberg and others, it has become clear that these protein components are remarkably conserved across the full spectrum of eukaryotes, from yeast to human cells.

Using this system, Kornberg made the major discovery that transmission of gene regulatory signals to the RNA polymerase machinery is accomplished by an additional protein complex that they dubbed Mediator. As noted by the Nobel Prize committee, "the great complexity of eukaryotic organisms is actually enabled by the fine interplay between tissue-specific substances, enhancers in the DNA and Mediator. The discovery of Mediator is therefore a true milestone in the understanding of the transcription process."

At the same time as Kornberg was pursuing these biochemical studies of the transcription process, he devoted two decades to the development of methods to visualize the atomic structure of RNA polymerase and its associated protein components. Initially, Kornberg took advantage of expertise with lipid membranes gained from his graduate studies to devise a technique for the formation of two-dimensional protein crystals on lipid bilayers. These 2D crystals could then be analyzed using electron microscopy to derive low-resolution images of the protein's structure. Eventually, Kornberg was able to use X-ray crystallography to solve the 3-dimensional structure of RNA polymerase at atomic resolution. He has recently extended these studies to obtain structural images of RNA polymerase associated with accessory proteins. Through these studies, Kornberg has created an actual picture of how transcription works at a molecular level. According to the Nobel Prize committee, "the truly revolutionary aspect of the picture Kornberg has created is that it captures the process of transcription in full flow. What we see is an RNA-strand being constructed, and hence the exact positions of the DNA, polymerase and RNA during this process."

=== Lipids membrane ===
As a graduate student at Stanford University, Kornberg's studied the rotation of phospholipids and defined for the first time the dynamics of lipids in the membrane. Kornberg called the movement of lipid from one leaflet to the other flip-flop because he had studied only a few years before electronic circuit elements called flip-flops. The term gave rise to the naming of proteins called flippases and floppases.

=== Industrial collaborations ===
Kornberg has served on the Scientific Advisory Boards of the following companies: Cocrystal Discovery, Inc (Chairman), ChromaDex Corporation (Chairman), StemRad, Ltd, Oplon Ltd (Chairman), and Pacific Biosciences. Kornberg has also been a director for the following companies: OphthaliX Inc., Protalix BioTherapeutics, Can-Fite BioPharma, Ltd, Simploud and Teva Pharmaceutical Industries, Ltd.

== Awards and honors ==
Kornberg has received the following awards:

- 1981: Eli Lilly Award in Biological Chemistry
- 1982: Passano Award from the Passano Foundation
- 1990: Ciba-Drew Award
- 1997: Harvey Prize from the Technion – Israel Institute of Technology
- 2000: Gairdner Foundation International Award
- 2001: Hoppe-Seyler Award, Society for Biochemistry and Molecular Biology, Germany
- 2001: Welch Award in Chemistry
- 2002: ASBMB-Merck Award
- 2002: Pasarow Award in Cancer Research
- 2002: Grand Prix Charles-Leopold Mayer
- 2003: Elected to EMBO Membership
- 2003: Massry Prize from the Keck School of Medicine, University of Southern California
- 2005: General Motors Cancer Research Foundation’s Alfred P. Sloan, Jr. Prize
- 2006: Dickson Prize from University of Pittsburgh
- 2006: Louisa Gross Horwitz Prize from Columbia University
- 2006: Nobel Prize in Chemistry
- 2008: American Philosophical Society Membership
- 2009: Elected a Foreign Member of the Royal Society (ForMemRS)
- 2012: Honorary Fellow, Ruppin Academic Center

== See also ==
- List of Jewish Nobel laureates
