= Penoscrotal transposition =

Congenital defect

Penoscrotal transposition (PST) is a group of congenital defects involving an abnormal spatial arrangement of penis and scrotum.

== Types ==
There are two types of penoscrotal transposition.

- Complete penoscrotal transposition
- Incomplete penoscrotal transposition

In incomplete penoscrotal transposition, penis is located in the middle of the scrotum, but in complete transposition, penis is located in the perineum.

== Treatment ==
Gold standard of PST treatment is surgical repair. Repair technique of penoscrotal transposition included a Glenn–Anderson technique, which is developed by F. Glenn and E. Everett Anderson.
