= Arthur Kornberg =

American biochemist (1918–2007)

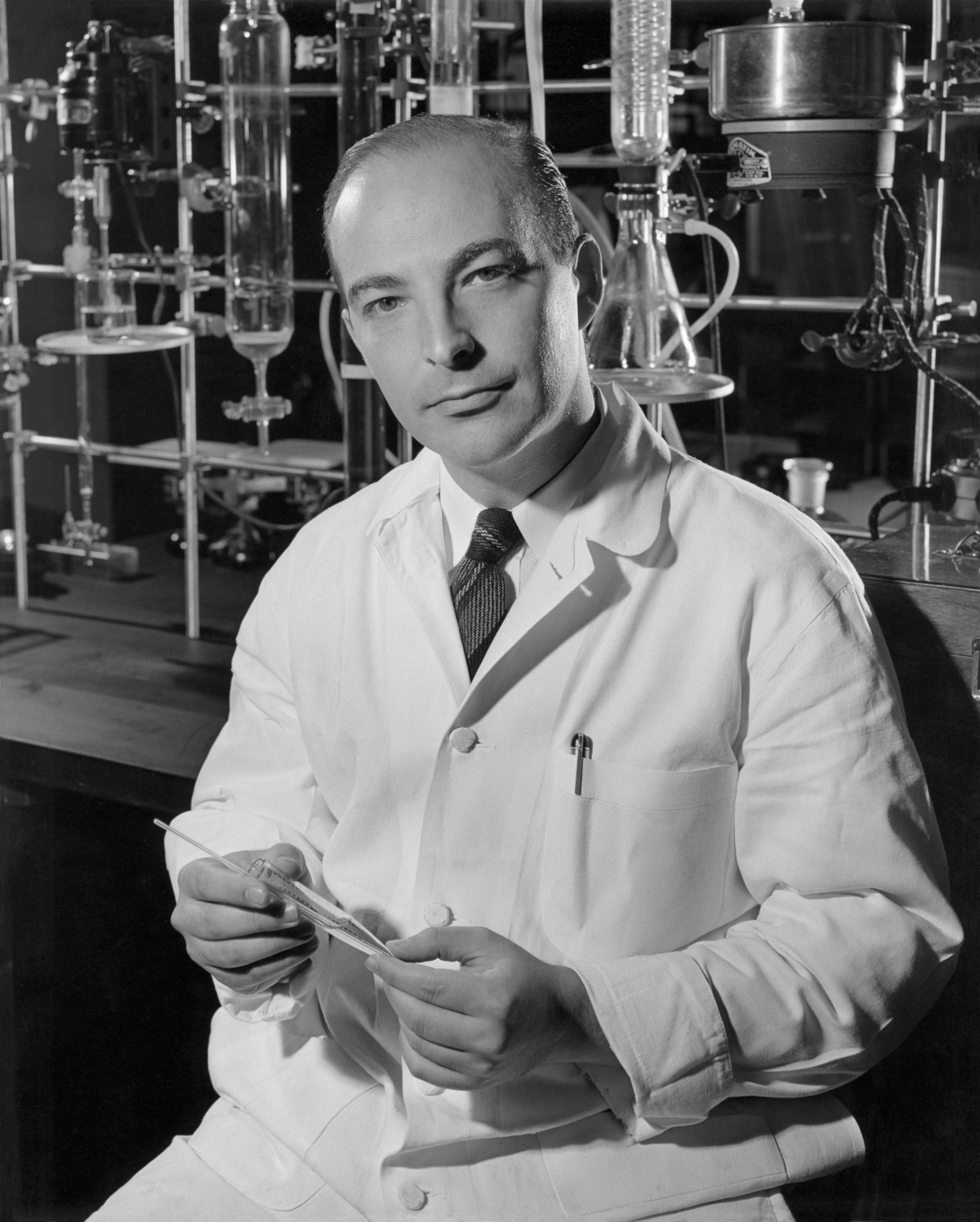
- Kornberg c. 1950
- Born: March 3, 1918; New York City, U.S.
- Died: October 26, 2007 (aged 89); Palo Alto, California, U.S.
- Education: City College of New York; University of Rochester
- Spouse(s): Sylvy Ruth Levy (1943–1986; her death; 3 children); Charlene Walsh Levering (1988–1995; her death); Carolyn Frey Dixon (1998–2007; his death)
- Children: 3 sons with his first wife: Roger David Kornberg, Thomas B. Kornberg, Kenneth Andrew Kornberg
- Awards: Paul-Lewis Award in Enzyme Chemistry (1951); Nobel Prize in Physiology or Medicine (1959); National Medal of Science (1979); Gairdner Foundation Award (1995)
- Scientific career
- Fields: Molecular biology
- Workplaces: National Institutes of Health; Washington University in St. Louis; Stanford University
- Doctoral students: Randy Schekman; James Spudich; Tania A. Baker

Arthur Kornberg (March 3, 1918 – October 26, 2007) was an American biochemist who won the Nobel Prize in Physiology or Medicine in 1959 for the discovery of "the mechanisms in the biological synthesis of ribonucleic acid and deoxyribonucleic acid" together with Spanish biochemist and physician Severo Ochoa of New York University. He was also awarded the Paul-Lewis Award in Enzyme Chemistry from the American Chemical Society in 1951, an L.H.D. degree from Yeshiva University in 1962, and the National Medal of Science in 1979. In 1991, Kornberg received the Golden Plate Award of the American Academy of Achievement and the Gairdner Foundation Award in 1995.

Kornberg's primary research interests were in biochemistry, especially enzyme chemistry, deoxyribonucleic acid synthesis (DNA replication) and studying the nucleic acids which control heredity in animals, plants, bacteria and viruses.

== Early life and education ==
Born in New York City, Kornberg was the son of Jewish parents Joseph and Lena (née Katz) Kornberg, who emigrated to New York from Austrian Galicia (now part of Poland) in 1900 before they were married. His paternal grandfather had changed the family name from Queller (also spelled Kweller) to avoid the draft by taking on the identity of someone who had already completed military service. Joseph married Lena in 1904. Joseph worked as a sewing machine operator in the sweat shops of the Lower East Side, Manhattan for almost 30 years, and when his health failed, opened a small hardware store in Brooklyn, where Arthur assisted customers at the age of nine. Joseph spoke at least six languages although he had no formal education.

Arthur Kornberg was educated first at Abraham Lincoln High School and then at City College of New York. He received a B.S. in 1937, followed by a Doctor of Medicine at the University of Rochester in 1941. Kornberg had a mildly elevated level of bilirubin in his blood— jaundice due to a hereditary genetic condition known as Gilbert's syndrome—and, while at medical school, he took a survey of fellow students to discover how common the condition was. The results were published in Kornberg's first research paper in 1942.

Kornberg's internship was at Strong Memorial Hospital in Rochester, New York, in 1941–1942. After completing his medical training, he joined the armed services as a lieutenant in the United States Coast Guard, serving as a ship's doctor in 1942 in the Caribbean. Rolla Dyer, the Director of National Institutes of Health, had noticed his paper and invited him to join the research team at the Nutrition Laboratory of the NIH. From 1942 to 1945, Kornberg's work was the feeding of specialized diets to rats to discover new vitamins.

== Research and career ==
The feeding of rats was boring work, and Kornberg became fascinated by enzymes. He transferred to Dr Severo Ochoa's laboratory at New York University in 1946, and took summer courses at Columbia University to fill out the gaps in his knowledge of organic and physical chemistry while learning the techniques of enzyme purification at work. He became Chief of the Enzyme and Metabolism Section at NIH from 1947–1953, working on understanding of ATP production from NAD and NADP. This led to his work on how DNA is built up from simpler molecules.

While working at NIH, he also researched at Washington University in St. Louis (in the lab of Carl Ferdinand Cori and Gerty Cori in 1947), and the University of California, Berkeley (in the lab of Horace Barker in 1951).

In 1953 he became professor and head of the department of microbiology, Washington University in St. Louis, until 1959. Here he continued experimenting with the enzymes which created DNA. In 1956 he isolated the first DNA polymerizing enzyme, now known as DNA polymerase I. This got him elected to the United States National Academy of Sciences in 1957 and won him the Nobel prize in 1959.

In 1960, he was elected to the American Philosophical Society, received a LL.D. again from City College and a D.Sc. at the University of Rochester in 1962. He became professor and executive head of the department of biochemistry, Stanford University, in 1959. In an interview in 1997, Arthur Kornberg (referring to Josh Lederberg) said: "Lederberg really wanted to join my department. I knew him; he's a genius, but he'd be unable to focus and to operate within a small family group like ours, and so, I was instrumental in establishing a department of genetics [at Stanford] of which he would be chairman."

Kornberg's mother died of gas gangrene from a spore infection after a routine gall bladder operation in 1939. This started his lifelong fascination with spores, and he devoted some of his research efforts to understanding them while at Washington University. From 1962 to 1970, in the midst of his work on DNA synthesis, Kornberg devoted half his research effort to determining how DNA is stored in the spore, what replication mechanisms are included, and how the spore generates a new cell. This was an unfashionable but complex area of science, and although some progress was made, eventually Kornberg abandoned this research.

The Arthur Kornberg Medical Research Building at the University of Rochester Medical Center was named in his honor in 1999.

Until his death, Kornberg maintained an active research laboratory at Stanford and regularly published scientific journal articles. For several years the focus of his research was the metabolism of inorganic polyphosphate.

The "Kornberg school" of biochemistry refers to Arthur Kornberg's many graduate students and post-doctoral fellows, i.e., his intellectual children, and the trainees of his trainees, i.e., his intellectual grandchildren. Kornberg's intellectual children include I. Robert Lehman, Charles C. Richardson, Randy Schekman, William T. Wickner, James Rothman, Arturo Falaschi and Ken-ichi Arai.

=== Books ===
- "Germ Stories". University Science Books, 2007, ISBN 1891389513
- For the Love of Enzymes: The Odyssey of a Biochemist. Harvard University Press, Cambridge, MA, 1989, ISBN 0-674-30776-3
- The Golden Helix: Inside Biotech Ventures. University Science Books, 2002, ISBN 1-891389-19-X
- Enzymatic Synthesis of DNA, John Wiley & Sons, 1961
- DNA Synthesis, W. H. Freeman and Co., San Francisco, 1974 ISBN 0-7167-0586-9
- DNA Replication, W. H. Freeman and Co., San Francisco, 1980 ISBN 0-7167-1102-8
- DNA Replication (2nd Edition) with Tania A. Baker., W. H. Freeman and Co., New York, 1992 ISBN 0-7167-2003-5

== Personal life ==
On November 21, 1943, Kornberg married Sylvy Ruth Levy, also a biochemist of note. She worked closely with Kornberg and contributed significantly to the discovery of DNA polymerase. According to their second son, Thomas, “the joke in the family—and it was just a joke—was that when the prize was announced, she said 'I was robbed!’”

Arthur and Sylvy Kornberg had three sons: Roger David Kornberg (1947), Thomas B. Kornberg (1948), and Kenneth Andrew Kornberg (1950). Roger is Professor of Structural Biology at Stanford University, and the 2006 laureate of the Nobel Prize in Chemistry. Thomas discovered DNA polymerase II and III in 1970 and is now a professor at the University of California, San Francisco. Kenneth is an architect specializing in the design of biomedical and biotechnology laboratories and buildings.

Arthur Kornberg was married three times. His first two wives predeceased him. Sylvy Kornberg died in 1986. Arthur Kornberg remarried in 1988 but his second wife, the former Charlene Walsh Levering, died in 1995. In December 1998 Arthur Kornberg married Carolyn Frey Dixon.

When he was in his eighties, Kornberg continued to conduct research full-time at department of biochemistry at Stanford. He died on October 26, 2007, at Stanford Hospital from respiratory failure.

== See also ==
- List of Jewish Nobel laureates
