= Bionic Leaf =

Solar energy technology

The Bionic Leaf is a biomimetic system that gathers solar energy via photovoltaic cells that can be stored or used in a number of different functions. Bionic leaves can be composed of both synthetic (metals, ceramics, polymers, etc.) and organic materials (bacteria), or solely made of synthetic materials. The Bionic Leaf has the potential to be implemented in communities, such as urbanized areas to provide clean air as well as providing needed clean energy.

== History ==
In 2009 at MIT, Daniel Nocera's lab first developed the "artificial leaf", a device made from silicon and an anode electrocatalyst for the oxidation of water, capable of splitting water into hydrogen and oxygen gases. In 2012, Nocera came to Harvard and The Silver Lab of Harvard Medical School joined Nocera’s team. Together the teams expanded the existing technology to create the Bionic Leaf. It merged the concept of the artificial leaf with genetically engineered bacteria that feed on the hydrogen and convert CO_{2} in the air into alcohol fuels or chemicals.

The first version of the teams Bionic Leaf was created in 2015 but the catalyst used was harmful to the bacteria. In 2016, a new catalyst was designed to solve this issue, named the "Bionic Leaf 2.0". Other versions of artificial leaves have been developed by the California Institute of Technology and the Joint Center for Artificial Photosynthesis, the University of Waterloo, and the University of Cambridge.

== Mechanics ==
=== Photosynthesis ===
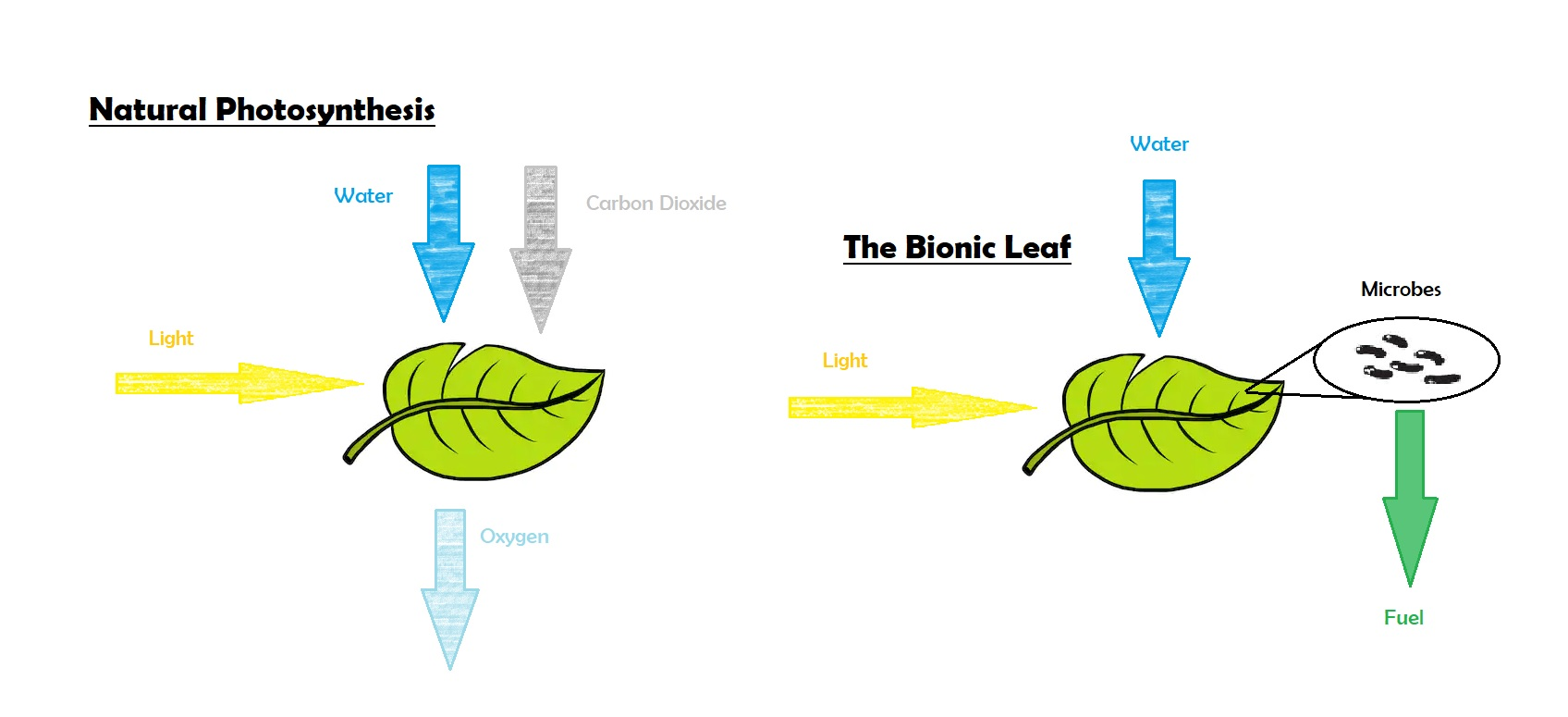
Natural Photosynthesis vs. The Bionic Leaf at its simplest form.

In natural photosynthesis, photosynthetic organisms produce energy-rich organic molecules from water and carbon dioxide by using solar radiation. Therefore, the process of photosynthesis removes carbon dioxide, a greenhouse gas, from the air. Artificial photosynthesis, as performed by the Bionic Leaf, is approximately 10 times more efficient than natural photosynthesis. Using a catalyst, the Bionic Leaf can remove excess carbon dioxide in the air and convert that to useful alcohol fuels, like isopropanol and isobutanol.

The efficiency of the Bionic Leaf's artificial photosynthesis is the result of bypassing obstacles in natural photosynthesis by virtue of its artificiality. In natural systems, there are numerous energy conversion bottlenecks that limit the overall efficiency of photosynthesis. As a result, most plants do not exceed 1% efficiency and even microalgae grown in bioreactors do not exceed 3%. Existing artificial photosynthetic solar-to-fuels cycles may exceed natural efficiencies but cannot complete the cycle via carbon fixation. When the catalysts of the Bionic Leaf are coupled with the bacterium Ralstonia eutropha, this results in a hybrid system capable of carbon dioxide fixation. This system can store more than half of its input energy as products of carbon dioxide fixation. Overall, the hybrid design allows for artificial photosynthesis with efficiencies rivaling that of natural photosynthesis.

=== Artificial Photosynthesis Systems ===
The Bionic Leaf is an artificial leaf that interfaces a triple-junction Si wafer with amorphous silicon photovoltaic with hydrogen- and oxygen-evolving catalysts made from a ternary alloy, nickel-molybdenum-zinc (NiMoZn) and a cobalt–phosphate cluster (Co-OEC). The Co-OEC is able to operate in natural water at room temperature. Accordingly, the Bionic Leaf can be immersed in water and when held up to sunlight, it can effect direct solar energy conversion via water-splitting.

The Bionic Leaf, by virtue of the Co-OEC, also exhibits self-assembling and self-healing properties. The Co-OEC self-assembles upon oxidation of an earth metal ion from 2+ to 3+. It also self-heals upon application of a potential, wherein the cluster reforms due to equilibrium between aqueous cobalt and phosphate.

The Bionic Leaf can be used in artificial photosynthetic systems. One such system is a hybrid water-splitting-biosynthetic system that can operate at low driving voltages. The catalyst system of the Bionic Leaf is used in conjunction with bacterium Ralstonia eutropha. The bacterium is grown in contact with the catalysts and then consumes the produced H_{2} from the water-splitting reaction. After consumption, the bacterium synthesizes biomass and fuels or chemical products from low CO_{2} concentration in the presence of O_{2}. The usage of the bacterium requires a biocompatible catalyst system that is not toxic to the bacterium and that lowers the overpotential for water splitting. The original catalyst used, the nickel-molybdenum-zinc (NiMoZn) alloy, poisoned the microbes by destroying the bacteria's DNA. Accordingly, this hybrid system uses a cobalt-phosphorus (Co-P) alloy cathode that is resistant to reactive oxygen species. This in return leaves no excess metal and does not form oxygen radicals, leaving the microbes and DNA unharmed. This alloy drives the hydrogen evolution reaction while a cobalt-phosphate (CoP_{i}) anode drives the oxygen evolution reaction. This new catalyst can run up to 16 days at a time when compared to the nickel-molybdenum-zinc (NiMoZn) alloy.

== Applications ==
=== Agriculture ===
Early results from Dan Nocera, a researcher at Harvard University, gave insight on how his newly created bionic leaf can be used for fertilizer production. This new bionic leaf uses photovoltaic cells in conjunction with Xanthobacter autotrophicus bacteria to create a plastic called polyhydroxybutyrate (PHB). PHB supplies energy to the bacteria's natural enzymes which then converts nitrogen gas from the air into ammonia. The bionic leaf, can perform this process using renewable electricity, allowing for the sustainable production of ammonia and bio-fertilizers. Currently, the main industrial production of ammonia is performed by what is known as the Haber-Bosch Process, which uses natural gas as the main energy source. The bacteria within the bionic leaf also help to remove carbon dioxide from the environment. The bionic leaf must still pass an environmental impact study in order to determine if this bacteria is safe to release into the wild. Although the bionic leaf currently operates at a mere 25% efficiency, research and development is still with the hopes of improving the process. X. autotrophicus cells act as a living bio-fertilizer due to their ability to directly promote plant growth when applied to organic material. A study was conducted by comparing plants treated with no fertilizer to the same treated with increasing amounts of X. autotrophicus culture. The treated plants root mass and total mass increased by approximately 130% and 100% respectively, compared to that of the untreated control group.

=== Atmosphere ===
Carbon dioxide, a greenhouse gas, traps heat in the atmosphere, the bionic leaf can potentially be used to reduce the carbon dioxide within the atmosphere. While the bionic leaf is running mimics photosynthesis by converting the carbon dioxide in air into fuels. The bionic leaf can eliminate 180 grams of carbon dioxide out of 230,000 liters of air for each kilowatt hour of energy it consumes. While removing large amounts of carbon dioxide from the atmosphere not possible yet on a large scale, this technology is useful in areas where carbon dioxide is produced such as power plants. It can also be implemented within urban areas, providing clean air to the area. The technology may also be used on a smaller scale, helping communities produce, harness, and consume the require energy they need.

=== Bionic Facades ===
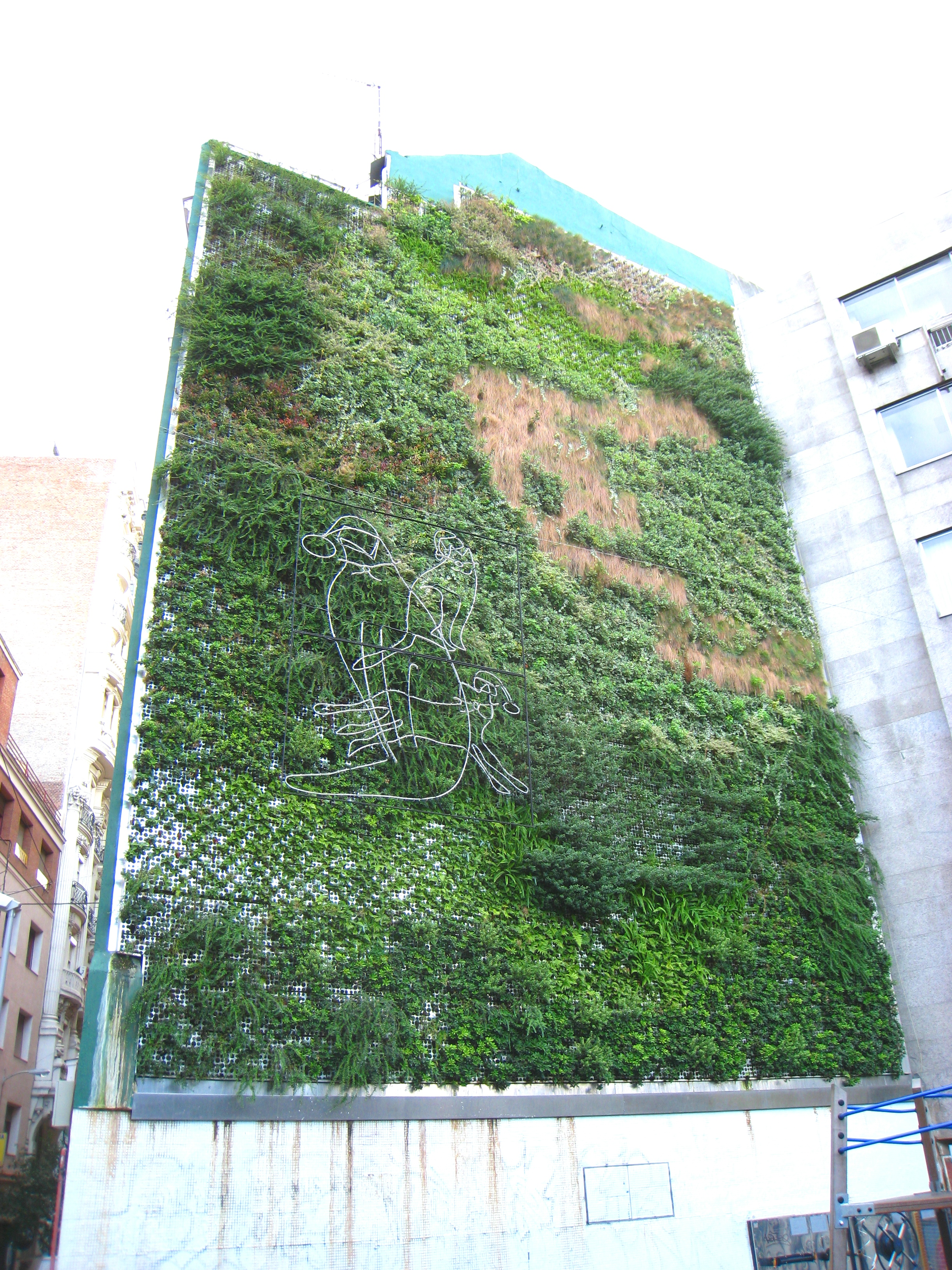
Example of a natural vertical greenery system (green wall) on a building's exterior wall.

Bionic leaves have been considered as an alternative to vertical greenery systems (VGS), also known as green facades. Like VGS, bionic facades can be implemented in buildings to reduce energy consumption from cooling, absorb solar radiation, and reduce CO_{2} emissions. Unlike their natural counterpart, bionic facades require less costly maintenance (irrigation, fertilization, pest-control) and can be potentially adjusted to external conditions like the changing of seasons. The general structure of the bionic leaves used for these experiments can be characterized as a photovoltaic (PV) cell or plate resistive heater backed with a ceramic evaporative matrix. An experiment comparing the performance of a PV panel alone versus the bionic leaf panel showed increased electricity production of up to 6.6% due to the evaporative cooling from the matrix. The bionic facade also had a comparable effect on lowering the ambient temperature at the building-to-air interface as a green facade planted with ivy. The cooling effect paired with the electricity output of the bionic facade showed a CO_{2} emissions reduction that was 25 times greater than the daily average CO_{2} consumption of the ivy wall.

== See also ==
- Artificial Leaf
- Bioplastic
- Fuel Cell
- Metabolic Engineering
- Photosynthesis
