= Jessica Polka =

American biochemist

- Other name: J. K. Polka
- Education: University of California, San Francisco (PhD); University of North Carolina at Chapel Hill ( (BS)
- Scientific career
- Workplaces: Astera Institute; ASAPbio; Whitehead Institute; Harvard Medical School0
- Thesis: Diversity in the bacterial cytoskeleton: Assembly, structure, and cellular mechanisms of AlfA, a plasmid segregating actin from B. subtilis (2015)
- Doctoral advisor: Dyche Mullins
- Other academic advisors: Pamela Silver
- Website: www.jessicapolka.com

Jessica Polka is a biochemist and the founding Executive Director of ASAPbio (Accelerating Science and Publication in biology), a non-profit initiative promoting innovation and transparency via preprints and open peer review. She was one of the organizers of the many meetings they held on scholarly communication. In February 2024, she left ASAPbio and currently serves as the Program Director for Open Science at Astera.

== Education ==
Polka received a BS in biology from the University of North Carolina at Chapel Hill in 2007. While there, she was a Morehead Scholar. She obtained a Ph.D. in biochemistry from the University of California, San Francisco under the supervision of Dyche Mullins in 2012.

== Career ==
In 2013 Polka became a research fellow in the department of Systems Biology at Harvard Medical School with Pamela Silver as advisor. She was also held a visiting scholar at the Whitehead Institute in Massachusetts. Polka conducted research in the assembly, function, and applications of protein polymers in bacteria, such as membrane-breaking protein needles called R bodies. Polka's work on R bodies was discussed in the American magazine The Atlantic, and covered by the American Chemical Society. Polka discovered that carboxysome, a protein organelle in cyanobacteria, grows like a crystal until it is coated by a layer of shell proteins.

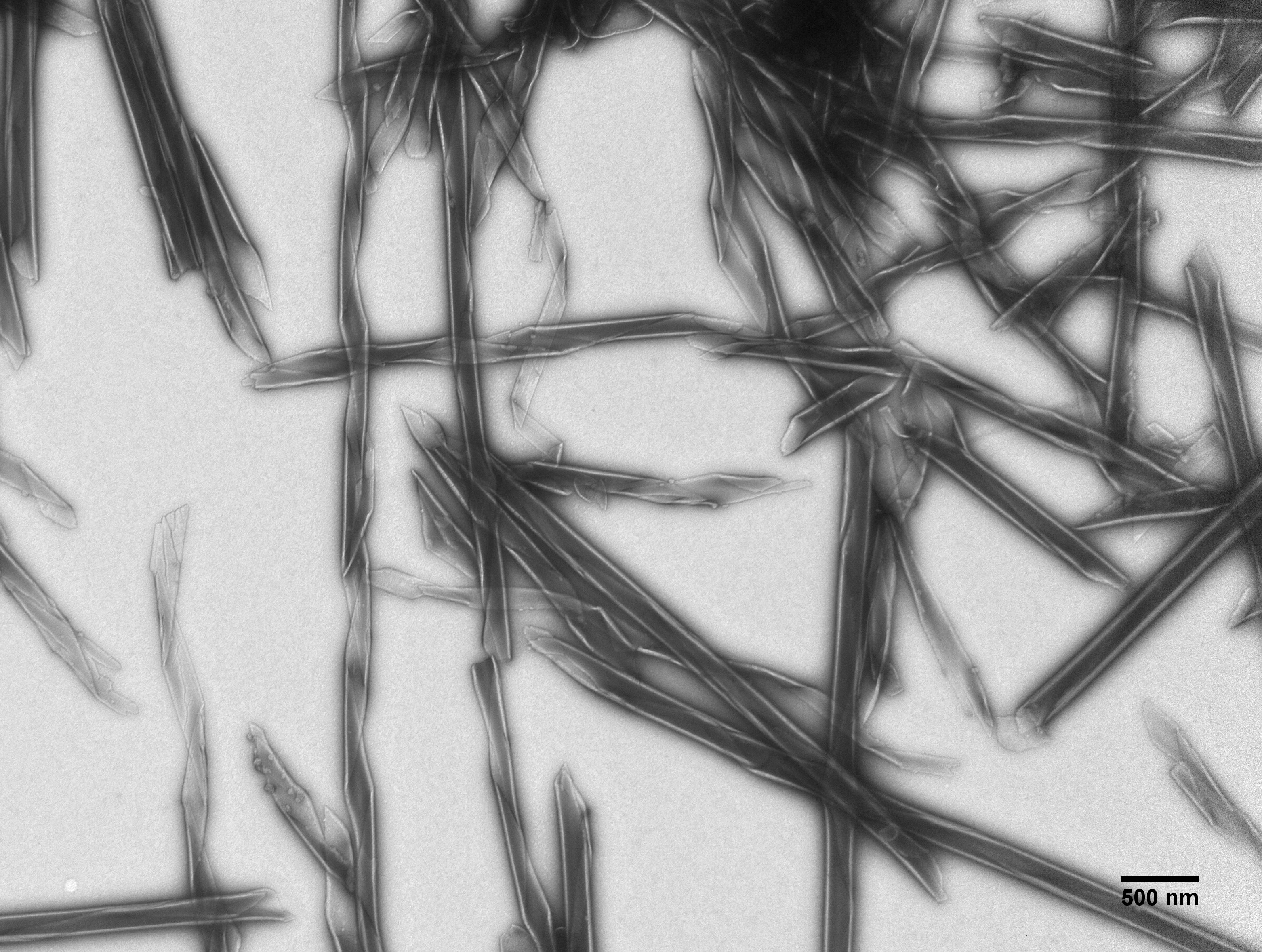
Negatively stained electron micrograph of purified R bodies in their extended (low pH) state, taken by Polka.

Polka was co-chair of the American Society for Cell Biology's COMPASS (Committee for Postdocs and Students) during 2013 and 2014.

=== Improving research culture ===
Polka is on the steering committee for Rescuing Biomedical Research, an initiative to discuss solutions to problems addressed in the April 2014 PNAS article "Rescuing US biomedical research from its systemic flaws".

Polka is recognised as having insight into issues surrounding open peer review, preprint and early career progression, and has been quoted in numerous articles by Nature and Science on these topics. In 2015, Polka and Viviane Callier wrote an article for the careers column in Nature where they argue that funding agencies should support more than 16% of postdocs through fellowships. This would allow postdocs to "strike out away from the beaten path [and] will bring fresh ideas and approaches to the table".

==== Future of Research ====
Polka was one of the organisers of the first Future of Research Symposium in Boston in 2014. She was on the executive committee until she became president of the board of directors in 2016. Polka is involved in creating debate amongst early-career scientists about the financial, historical and political influences on academic research. Future of Research was awarded the People of the Year award in 2015 by Science journal for their "efforts to empower early-career and aspiring scientists...".

==== ASAPbio ====
Polka was a founder of ASAPbio which began in 2015 after Ron Vale showed that University of California, San Francisco students were taking a long time to publish and proposed that preprinting might mitigate the issue. Vale recruited Polka, Daniel Colon-Ramos and Harold Varmus which led to the first ASAPbio meeting in February 2016 attended by scientists, representatives from funding agencies, journals and preprint servers. The meeting Polka led was widely recognized as a turning point in scholarly communication and a catalyst moment in the so-called "preprint revolution" in biology and science more generally. Polka began working full-time at ASAPbio in 2016 after funding was granted from the Simons Foundation, Sloan Foundation, Arnold Foundation, and Gordon and Betty Moore Foundation.

In 2016 Polka was described in the journal Nature as an "agent of change" for explaining how junior researchers can increase the impact of their work. For instance, ASAPbio encourages preprints within biology. ASAPbio tries to mitigate the effect of lengthy waiting times before publications are reviewed and published, following the example of physics, computer science and maths, fields that have already adopted preprints. She has also taken an interest in strategies for preventing sexual harassment in the scientific community. In 2017, PLOScast interviewed Polka about her work which contributes to the changing way that science is published.

Since 2019, ASAPBio has begun to host open databases to collate information about academic publishing practices. ReimagineReview tracks the different peer review policies and models of academic journals, with a focus on experimental forms of peer review. The Transpose database extends on this to cover journal policies including on peer review, co-reviewing, preprints, licensing, and versioning.

=== Awards and honors ===
- Beckman Coulter Distinguished Graduate Student Prize (American Society for Cell Biology) (2013)
- Jane Coffin Childs Fellowship (2013–2016)
