= Polyphosphate kinase =

Enzyme

polyphosphate kinase

Identifiers
- EC no.: 2.7.4.1
- CAS no.: 9026-44-2

Databases
- IntEnz: IntEnz view
- BRENDA: BRENDA entry
- ExPASy: NiceZyme view
- KEGG: KEGG entry
- MetaCyc: metabolic pathway
- PRIAM: profile
- PDB structures: RCSB PDB PDBe PDBsum
- Gene Ontology: AmiGO / QuickGO
Search
- PMC: articles
- PubMed: articles
- NCBI: proteins

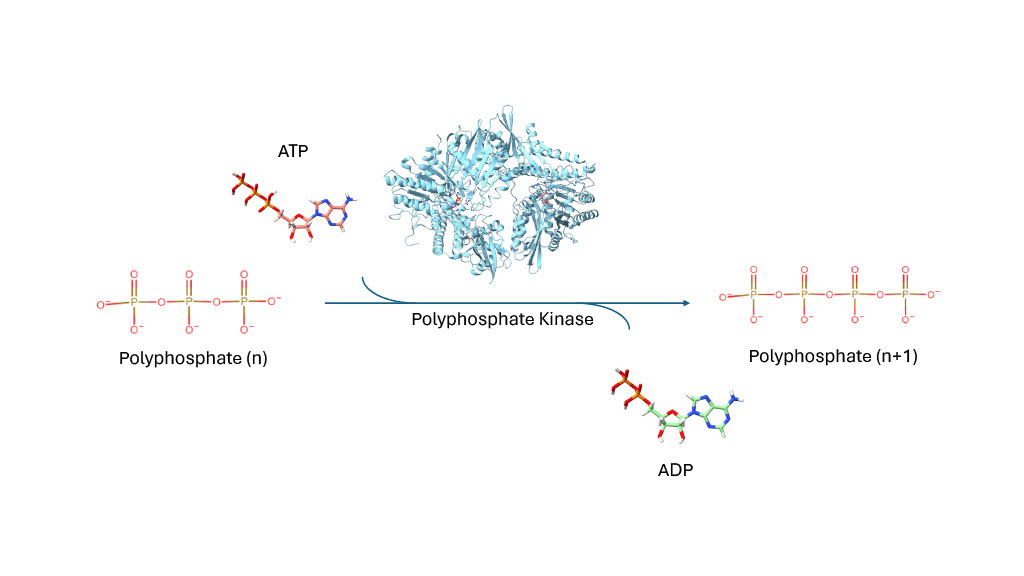
Polyphosphate kinase catalyzing ADP using ATP using a polyphosphate.

Polyphosphate kinase

Identifiers
- Symbol: PP_kinase
- Pfam: PF02503
- InterPro: IPR003414
Available protein structures:
- Pfam: structures / ECOD
- PDB: RCSB PDB; PDBe; PDBj
- PDBsum: structure summary
- PDB: 1xdoB:2-682 1xdpB:2-682

In enzymology, a polyphosphate kinase (EC 2.7.4.1), or polyphosphate polymerase, is an enzyme that catalyzes the formation of polyphosphate from ATP, with chain lengths of up to a thousand or more orthophosphate moieties.

ATP + (phosphate)_{n} $\rightleftharpoons$ ADP + (phosphate)_{n+1}

Thus, the two substrates of this enzyme are ATP and polyphosphate [(phosphate)n], whereas its two products are ADP and polyphosphate extended by one phosphate moiety [(phosphate)n+1].

This enzyme is a membrane protein and goes through an intermediate stage during the reaction where it is autophosphorylated with a phosphate group covalently linked to a basic amino acyl residue through an N-P bond.

Several enzymes catalyze polyphosphate polymerization. Some of these enzymes couple phosphotransfer to transmembrane transport. These enzyme/transporters are categorized in the Transporter Classification Database (TCDB) under the Polyphosphate Polymerase/YidH Superfamily (TC# 4.E.1) and are transferases that transfer phosphoryl groups (phosphotransferases) with polyphosphate as the acceptor. The systematic name of this enzyme class is ATP:polyphosphate phosphotransferase. This enzyme is also called polyphosphoric acid kinase.

== Families ==
The Polyphosphate Polymerase Superfamily (TC# 4.E.1) includes the following families:

- 4.E.1 - The Vacuolar (Acidocalcisome) Polyphosphate Polymerase (V-PPP) Family
- 9.B.51 - The Uncharacterized DUF202/YidH (YidH) Family

=== The Vacuolar (Acidocalcisome) Polyphosphate Polymerase (V-PPP) Family ===
Eukaryotes contain inorganic polyphosphate (polyP) and acidocalcisomes, which sequester polyP and store amino acids and divalent cations. Gerasimaitė et al. showed that polyP produced in the cytosol of yeast is toxic. Reconstitution of polyP translocation with purified vacuoles, the acidocalcisomes of yeast, showed that cytosolic polyP cannot be imported whereas polyP produced by the vacuolar transporter chaperone (VTC) complex, an endogenous vacuolar polyP polymerase, is efficiently imported and does not interfere with growth. PolyP synthesis and import require an electrochemical gradient, probably as a (partial) driving force for polyP translocation. VTC exposes its catalytic domain to the cytosol and has nine vacuolar transmembrane segments (TMSs). Mutations in the VTC transmembrane regions, which may constitute the translocation channel, block not only polyP translocation but also synthesis. Since these mutations are far from the cytosolic catalytic domain of VTC, this suggests that the VTC complex obligatorily couples synthesis of polyP to its vesicular import in order to avoid toxic intermediates in the cytosol. The process therefore conforms to the classical definition of Group Translocation, where the substrate is modified during transport. Sequestration of otherwise toxic polyP may be one reason for the existence of this mechanism in acidocalcisomes. The vacuolar polyphosphate kinase (polymerase) is described in TCDB with family TC# 4.E.1.

==== Function ====
CYTH-like superfamily enzymes, which include polyphosphate polymerases, hydrolyze triphosphate-containing substrates and require metal cations as cofactors. They have a unique active site located at the center of an eight-stranded antiparallel beta barrel tunnel (the triphosphate tunnel). The name CYTH originated from the gene designation for bacterial class IV adenylyl cyclases (CyaB), and from thiamine triphosphatase (THTPA). Class IV adenylate cyclases catalyze the conversion of ATP to 3',5'-cyclic AMP (cAMP) and PPi. Thiamine triphosphatase is a soluble cytosolic enzyme which converts thiamine triphosphate to thiamine diphosphate. This domain superfamily also contains RNA triphosphatases, membrane-associated polyphosphate polymerases, tripolyphosphatases, nucleoside triphosphatases, nucleoside tetraphosphatases and other proteins with unknown functions.

The generalized reaction catalyzed by the vectorial polyphosphate polymerases is:

ATP + (phosphate)_{n} in the cytoplasm $\rightleftharpoons$ ADP + (phosphate)_{n+1} in the vacuolar lumen

==== Structure ====
VTC2 has three recognized domains: an N-terminal SPX domain, a large central CYTH-like domain and a smaller transmembrane VTC1 (DUF202) domain. The SPX domain is found in Syg1, Pho81, XPR1 (SPX), and related proteins. This domain is found at the amino termini of a variety of proteins. In the yeast protein, Syg1, the N-terminus directly binds to the G-protein beta subunit and inhibits transduction of the mating pheromone signal. Similarly, the N-terminus of the human XPR1 protein binds directly to the beta subunit of the G-protein heterotrimer, leading to increased production of cAMP. Thus, this domain is involved in G-protein associated signal transduction. The N-termini of several proteins involved in the regulation of phosphate transport, including the putative phosphate level sensors, Pho81 from Saccharomyces cerevisiae and NUC-2 from Neurospora crassa, have this domain.

The SPX domains of the S. cerevisiae low-affinity phosphate transporters, Pho87 and Pho90, auto-regulate uptake and prevent efflux. This SPX-dependent inhibition is mediated by a physical interaction with Spl2. NUC-2 contains several ankyrin repeats. Several members of this family are annotated as XPR1 proteins: the xenotropic and polytropic retrovirus receptor confers susceptibility to infection with xenotropic and polytropic murine leukaemia viruses (MLV). Infection by these retroviruses can inhibit XPR1-mediated cAMP signaling and result in cell toxicity and death. The similarity between Syg1 phosphate regulators and XPR1 sequences has been noted, as has the additional similarity to several predicted proteins of unknown function, from Drosophila melanogaster, Arabidopsis thaliana, Caenorhabditis elegans, Schizosaccharomyces pombe, S. cerevisiae, and many other diverse organisms.

As of 2015, several structures have been solved for this class of enzymes, with PDB accession codes 1XDO, 1XDP, 2O8R, 3CZP, 3CZQ, 3RHF.

=== The Uncharacterized DUF202/YidH (YidH) Family ===
Members of the YidH Family are found in bacteria, archaea and eukaryotes. Members of this family include YidH of E. coli (TC# 9.B.51.1.1) which has 115 amino acyl residues and 3 TMSs of α-helical nature. The first TMS has a low level of hydrophobicity, the second has a moderate level of hydrophobicity, and the third has very hydrophobic character. These traits appear to be characteristic of all members of this family. A representative list of proteins belonging to this family can be found in the Transporter Classification Database. In fungi, a long homologue of 351 aas has a similar 3 TMS DUF202 domain at its extreme C-terminus.
