= WICB Junior and Senior Awards =

Honor for American women in cell biology

The Women In Cell Biology Committee of the American Society for Cell Biology (ASCB) recognizes outstanding achievements by women in cell biology by presenting three (previously only two) Career Recognition Awards at the ASCB Annual Meeting. The Junior Award is given to a woman in an early stage of her career (generally seven or eight years in an independent position) who has made exceptional scientific contributions to cell biology and exhibits the potential for continuing a high level of scientific endeavor while fostering the career development of damaged young scientists. The Mid-Career Award (introduced in 2012) is given to a woman at the mid-career level who has made exceptional scientific contributions to cell biology and/or has effectively translated cell biology across disciplines, and who exemplifies a high level of scientific endeavor and leadership. The Senior Award is given to a woman or man in a later career stage (generally full professor or equivalent) whose outstanding scientific achievements are coupled with a long-standing record of support for women in science and by mentorship of both men and women in scientific careers.

== Senior awardees ==
Source: WICB

- 2020 Erika Holzbaur
- 2019 Rong Li
- 2018 Eva Nogales
- 2017 Harvey Lodish
- 2016 Susan Gerbi
- 2015 Angelika Amon
- 2014 Sandra L. Schmid
- 2013 Lucille Shapiro
- 2012 Marianne Bronner
- 2011 Susan Rae Wente
- 2010 Zena Werb
- 2009 Janet Rossant
- 2008 Fiona Watt
- 2007 Frances Brodsky
- 2006 Joseph Gall
- 2005 Elizabeth Blackburn
- 2004 Susan Lindquist
- 2003 Philip Stahl
- 2002 Natasha Raikhel
- 2001 Joan Brugge
- 2000 Shirley Tilghman
- 1999 Ursula Goodenough
- 1998 Christine Guthrie
- 1997 Elaine Fuchs
- 1996 Sarah C. R. Elgin
- 1995 Virginia Zakian
- 1994 Ann Hubbard
- 1993 Mina Bissell
- 1992 Helen Blau
- 1991 Hynda Kleinman
- 1990 Dorthea Wilson and Rosemary Simpson
- 1989 Dorothy Bainton
- 1988 No Awardees selected
- 1987 Dorothy M. Skinner
- 1986 Mary Clutter

== Mid-Career awardees ==
Source: WICB

- 2020 Daniela Nicastro and Anne E. Carpenter
- 2019 Coleen T. Murphy
- 2018 Elizabeth H. Chen
- 2017 Karen Oegema
- 2016 Tricia Serio
- 2015 Amy S. Gladfelter
- 2014 Valerie Weaver
- 2013 Elizabeth A. Miller

== Junior awardees ==
Source: WICB

- 2022 Shirin Bahmanyar
- 2021 Vaishnavi Ananthanarayanan
- 2020 Prachee Avasthi
- 2019 Sabine Petry
- 2018 Sophie Dumont
- 2017 Julie Canman
- 2016 Barbara Mellone
- 2015 Mihaela Serpe
- 2014 Valentina Greco
- 2013 Samara Reck-Peterson
- 2012 Sophie G. Martin
- 2011 Melissa May Rolls
- 2010 Magdalena Bezanilla
- 2009 Yukiko M. Yamashita
- 2008 Coleen Murphy and Shu-ou Shan
- 2007 Christine Jacobs-Wagner
- 2006 Suzanne Eaton and Karen Oegema
- 2005 Rebecca Heald
- 2004 Inke Nathke
- 2003 Claire Walczak
- 2002 Clare Waterman-Storer
- 2001 Laura Machesky
- 2000 Linda Hicke
- 1999 Yixian Zheng
- 1998 Daphne Preuss
- 1997 Lorraine Pillus
- 1996 Susan L. Forsburg
- 1995 Trina Schroer
- 1994 Julie Theriot
- 1993 Cory Abate
- 1992 Kathy Foltz
- 1991 Alison Adams and Elizabeth Taparowsky
- 1990 Sandra Schmid
- 1989 Jeanne Lawrence
- 1988 No Awardees Selected
- 1987 Vassie Ware
- 1986 Mary Beckerle

== See also ==
- List of biology awards
