= List of science and technology awards for women =

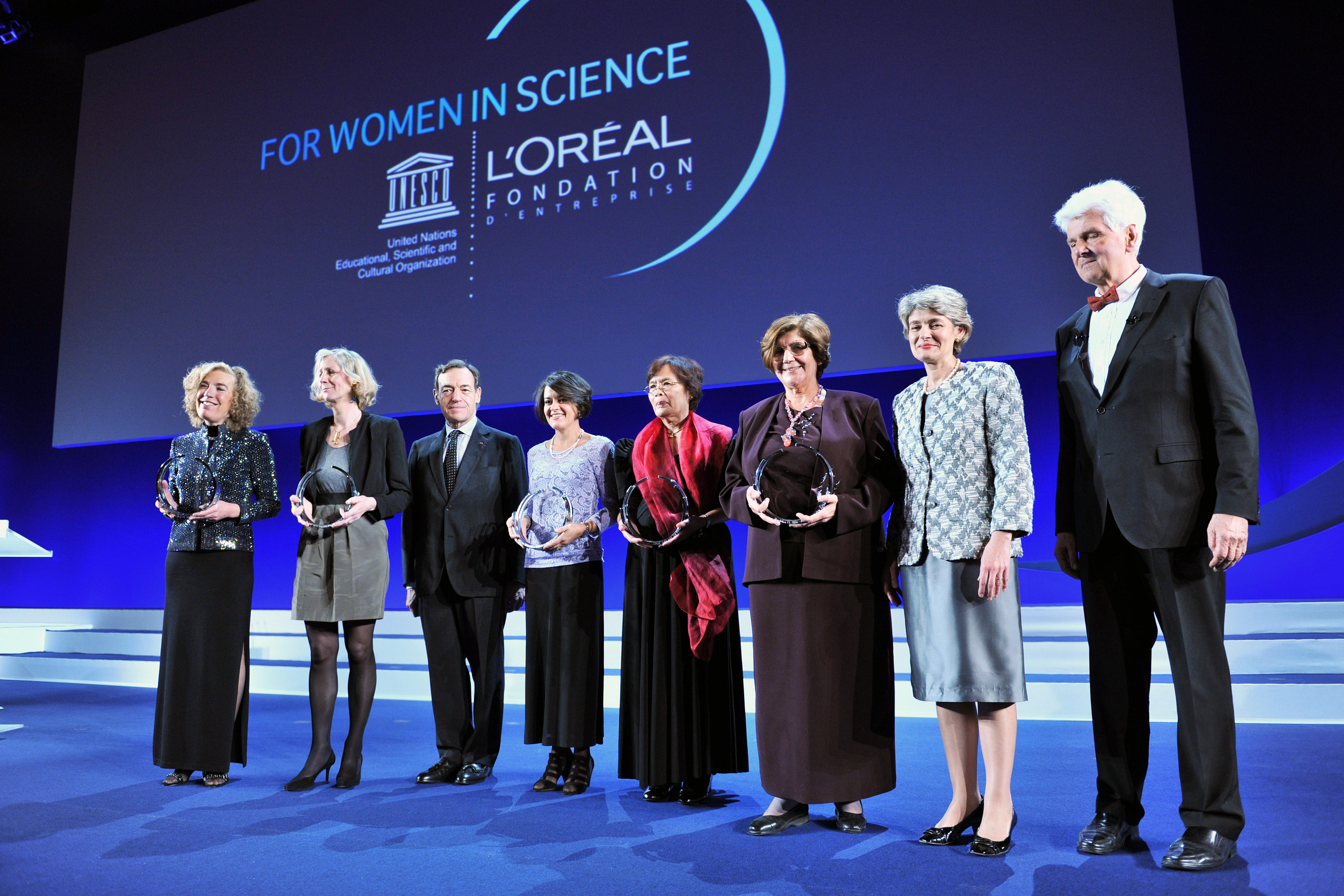
2010 L'Oréal-UNESCO For Women in Science Awards ceremony

This list of science and technology awards for women is an index to articles about notable awards made to women for work in science and the STEM (Science, technology, engineering, and mathematics) fields generally. It includes awards for astronomy, space and atmospheric science; biology and medicine; chemistry; engineering; mathematics; neuroscience; physics; technology; and general or multiple fields.

== Astronomy, space, atmospheric science ==
- Annie Jump Cannon Award in Astronomy – annual award for outstanding contributions to astronomy by a woman within five years of earning a doctorate degree
- Peter B. Wagner Memorial Award for Women in Atmospheric Sciences – awarded annually since 1998, based on paper completion, to a woman studying for a Masters or PhD in atmospheric science at a university in the United States

== Biology and medicine ==
- Elizabeth Blackwell Medal, given by the American Medical Women's Association to a woman physician "who has made the most outstanding contributions to the cause of women in the field of medicine"
- Federation of American Societies for Experimental Biology (FASEB) Excellence in Science Award
- Group on Women in Medicine and Science Leadership Awards, Association of American Medical Colleges
- Margaret Oakley Dayhoff Award from the Biophysical Society, Rockville, Maryland – given to a woman who "has achieved prominence for 'substantial contributions to science'" and showing high promise in the early part of her career
- Pearl Meister Greengard Prize – established 2004
- WICB Junior and Senior Awards from Women in Cell Biology (WICB)

== Chemistry ==
- ACS Award for Encouraging Women into Careers in the Chemical Sciences, sponsored by the Camille and Henry Dreyfus Foundation
- Garvan–Olin Medal – annual award that recognizes distinguished service to chemistry by women chemists
- Awards by the Iota Sigma Pi honorary society for women in chemistry:
  - Agnes Fay Morgan Research Award
  - Anna Louise Hoffman Award for Outstanding Achievement in Graduate Research
  - Centennial Award for Excellence in Undergraduate Teaching
  - Gladys Anderson Emerson Undergraduate Scholarship
  - Members-at-Large Re-entry Award
  - National Honorary Member
  - Outstanding Young Women in Chemistry award.
  - Undergraduate Excellence in Chemistry
  - Violet Diller Professional Excellence Award

== Engineering ==
- Sharon Keillor Award for Women in Engineering Education
- Achievement Award of the Society of Women Engineers
- Young Woman Engineer of the Year Award

== Mathematics ==
- Awards by the Association for Women in Mathematics:
  - Alice T. Schafer Prize – established 1991
  - Biographies of Contemporary Women in Mathematics Essay Contest – established in 2001 for biographical essays
  - Emmy Noether Lectures – an honorary lecture award
  - M. Gweneth Humphreys Award
  - Louise Hay Award for Contributions to Mathematics Education – established 1991
  - Ruth I. Michler Memorial Prize
  - Ruth Lyttle Satter Prize in Mathematics – established 1990
  - additional awards by the AWM
- Awards sponsored by the Kovalevskaia Fund in Mexico, Peru, and southern Africa
- Krieger–Nelson Prize for Distinguished Research by Women in Mathematics – established 1995 by the Canadian Mathematical Society

== Neuroscience ==
- Awards by the Society for Neuroscience:
  - Bernice Grafstein Award for Outstanding Accomplishments in Mentoring – for dedication to mentoring women neuroscientists
  - Louise Hanson Marshall Special Recognition Award – honors an individual who has significantly promoted the professional development of women in neuroscience through teaching, organizational leadership, public advocacy, or other efforts that are not necessarily related to research
  - Mika Salpeter Lifetime Achievement Award – presented for outstanding career achievements in neuroscience who has also significantly promoted the professional advancement of women in neuroscience
  - Patricia Goldman-Rakic Hall of Honor – posthumously recognizes a neuroscientist who has pursued career excellence and exhibited dedication and advancement of women in neuroscience

== Physics ==
- Jocelyn Bell Burnell Medal and Prize, Institute of Physics
- Maria Goeppert-Mayer Award, American Physical Society

== Technology ==
- BlackBerry Women and Technology Awards
- WITI@UC Athena Awards – Awards recognize those who embody, encourage, and promote the inclusion of women in technology. Awardees are leaders who inspire others to pursue and persist in technical careers.
- Lori Bunch "Recognized for Innovation in Cerner Millennium Implementation." She started with Cerner as an installation director then was promoted to senior project architect in 1997. She continues to be an innovator in the information technology industry.

== General or multiple fields ==
- Awards by the Association for Women in Science:
  - Leadership Award
  - Kirsten R. Lorentzen Award – for undergraduates in science
  - Next Generation Award
  - Pinnacle Award
- Amelia Earhart Fellowship
- Athena SWAN – a recognition scheme for UK universities working to advance and promote careers of women in science, engineering, and technology
- Scholarships for women in science by Brookhaven Women in Science:
  - Renate W. Chasman Scholarship – awarded to a graduate student performing research at Brookhaven National Laboratory
  - Gertrude S. Goldhaber Prize – awarded to a graduate student at Stony Brook University and/or performing thesis research at Brookhaven National Laboratory
- Edison Awards – Honoring excellence in innovation
- Edith D. Hendley Award – for a woman pursuing graduate studies at the University of Vermont
- Eiffel Tower recognition of women scientists
- Elizabeth Blackwell Award – given by Hobart and William Smith Colleges, established in 1958
- Faculty for the Future Fellowships – awarded by the Schlumberger Foundation to women from developing and emerging economies who are preparing for PhD or post-doctoral study in the physical sciences and engineering
- Inspiring Women in Science Awards - awarded by Nature in partnership with The Estée Lauder Companies to recognise exceptional early career women researchers and initiatives that support girls or young women to engage with, enjoy and study STEM subjects or to increase the retention of women in STEM careers
- Katharine F. Erskine Award for Medicine and Science
- Kovalevskaia prizes sponsored by the Kovalevskaia Fund in Vietnam and Cuba
- L'Oréal-UNESCO Awards for Women in Science, aka the Helena Rubinstein Women in Science Awards
- L’Oréal Korea-UNESCO for Women in Science Award, a national variant of the L'Oréal-UNESCO Awards for Women in Science
- Margaret W. Rossiter History of Women in Science Prize – established in 1987 by the History of Science Society
- Maria Mitchell Women in Science Award – from the Maria Mitchell Association "to recognize an individual whose efforts have encouraged the advancement of girls and women in the natural and physical sciences, mathematics, engineering, computer science and technology"
- Mariafranca Morselli Award – for a woman pursuing undergraduate studies in science at the University of Vermont
- Outstanding Women in Science Award – established 2002 by the Korea Science and Engineering Foundation
- OWSD-Elsevier Foundation Awards for Early-Career Women Scientists in the Developing World
- Rachel Carson Prize – Norwegian prize for women environmentalists
- Robin Copeland Memorial Fellowship – fellowship from CRDF Global for women leaders in emerging countries
- Saruhashi Prize – an award for Japanese women researchers in the natural sciences
- South African Awards for Women in Science (SAWiSA)
- Tagea Brandt Rejselegat – Danish award for women who have made significant contributions in science, literature, or art
- Taiwan Outstanding Women in Science Awards – for Taiwanese female STEM field researchers
- Weizmann Women & Science Award
- Women in Technology International (WITI) Hall of Fame
- Women of Discovery Award by WINGS WorldQuest
- Woman Scientist/Engineer of the Year Award – for South Korean female STEM field researchers
- VinFuture Prize by Vingroup

== See also ==
- List of organizations for women in science
- Lists of science and technology awards
- Lists of awards
