= Avasthi =

Avasthi is an Indian surname that may refer to

- Abhishek Avasthi (born 1982), Indian actor, choreographer, dancer and model
- Aditi Avasthi (born 1981), Indian entrepreneur
- Prachee Avasthi (born 1979), American biologist and science communicator
- Swati Avasthi, Indian American writer of fiction
- Vitthal Shankar Avasthi, Indian politician
