= Machi Dilworth =

Japanese and American plant biologist

Machi Fukuyama Dilworth
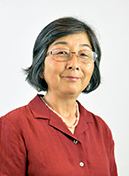
- Machi Dilworth
- Born: Japan
- Occupation: Plant biologist
- Years active: 1971-2019
- Known for: USDA Program Manager; NSF Program Director

Machi Fukuyama Dilworth (born January 3, 1945) is a Japanese and American plant biologist whose research focuses on genetic and hormonal metabolism in plants and who has been instrumental in the Arabidopsis thaliana genome sequencing project. Raised in Japan and attending university there, Dilworth moved to the United States for graduate studies and then worked at multiple universities as a research associate during the 1970s. Later hired by the United States Department of Agriculture (USDA) and the National Science Foundation (NSF), she was placed into increasing positions of influence by program director Mary Clutter and put in charge of the various plant genome projects in progress.

She used this opportunity and later positions in Japan, such as at Riken or the NSF's Tokyo Office and later the Okinawa Institute of Science and Technology Graduate University, to advance the prospects of women in science. Her primary drive has been to increase the number of women in Japan who go into STEM fields and contribute to scientific research. Dilworth has been noted by the American Society of Plant Biologists for her work and for being a founding member of its Legacy Society.

== Childhood and education ==
Dilworth was born in Tamano, Okayama Prefecture, on 3 January 1945. She attended International Christian University in Tokyo and received a Bachelor's degree in biology, during which she conducted undergraduate research in the lab of her adviser, Masayuki Katsumi. Visited by UCLA professor Bernard Phinney, he suggested that Dilworth become a graduate student in his lab, which she accepted after Katsumi's approval and began attending in 1967 through the use of a Fulbright Fellowship. She obtained a Ph.D. in plant physiology and biochemistry in 1971, with her thesis focusing on how gibberellins are biosynthesized.

== Career ==
=== Postdoctorate and research associate ===
Instead of returning to Japan, because of her marriage, Dilworth moved to work at Michigan State University alongside him. She then took a postdoctoral position at the MSU-DOE Plant Research Laboratory with Hans Kende as her sponsor. She was later made the postdoctoral representative for the faculty search committee and was involved in the hiring of two assistant professors for the research laboratory. After the birth of her first child and a year of maternity leave, Dilworth and her husband moved to the University of Georgia (UGA) in 1975. She obtained a research associate job in the lab of Leon Dure. During her three years there, she learned about genetic modification of plants using Agrobacterium tumefaciens after an interaction with Jozef Schell.

Dilworth and her family moved to Washington D.C. in 1978 after her husband obtained a position at the National Institutes of Health. However, despite her past experience, she was unable to find a new research position for most of a year before becoming a research associate at the Smithsonian Radiation Biology Laboratory under Beth Gantt. She only stayed for several months though before applying for and obtaining an assistant program director position at the National Science Foundation (NSF) in 1979, by the approval of Mary Clutter, program director in charge of the Developmental Biology program. Two years later in 1981, she became an associate program manager at the USDA Competitive Research Grants Office in charge of the Genetic Mechanisms Program. She was involved in creating coordinating committees to focus on the multiple scientific fields needed to map the genomes of plants. In 1987, she was a founding member of The Plant Cell, remaining the reviews editor until 1991.

=== NSF and STEM for women ===
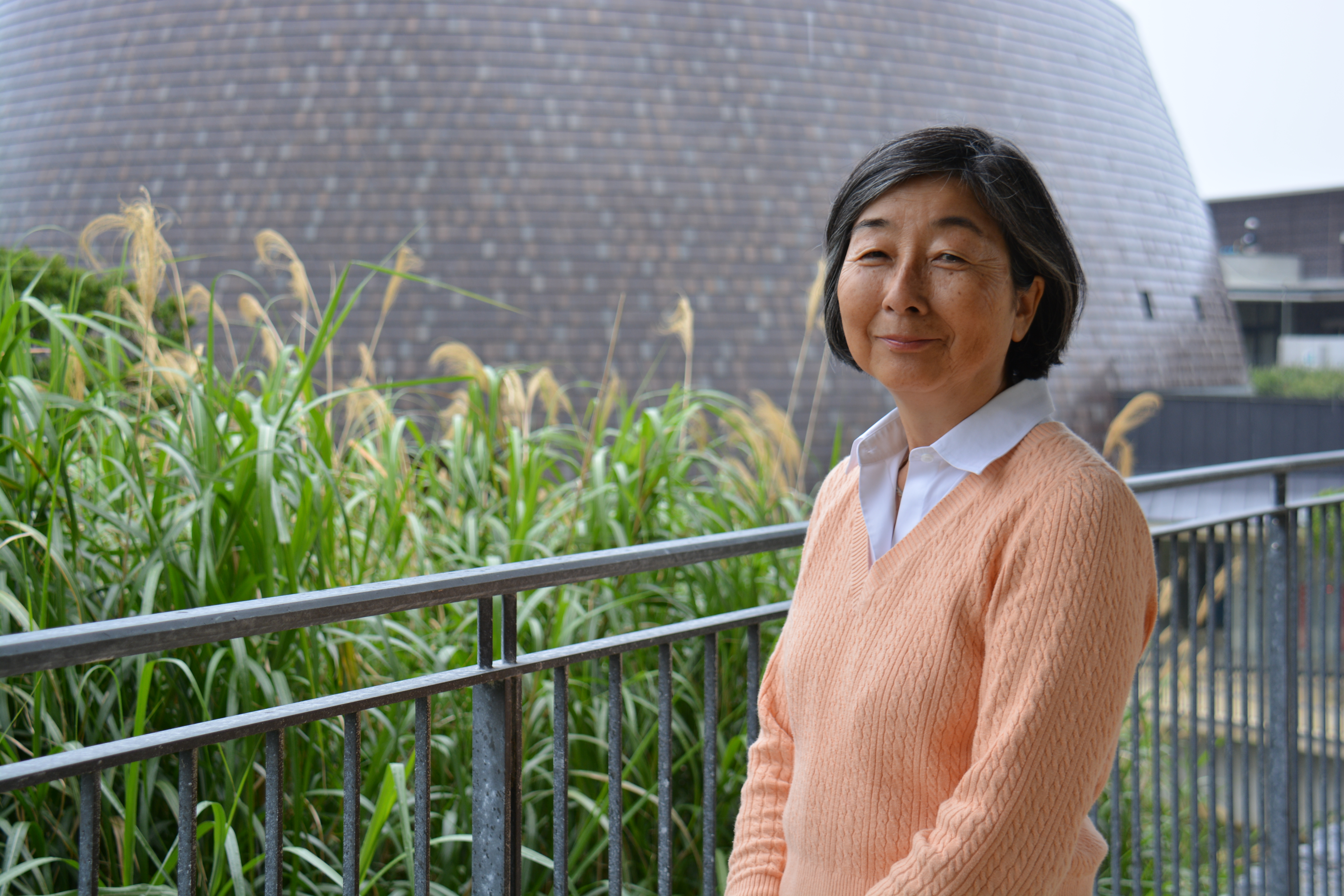
Dilworth posed for photos in front of the Auditorium, Okinawa Institute of Science and Technology

She spent most of a decade in the position navigating the proposal review panels before Clutter asked her to return to the NSF in 1990 to become a program director for the Biological Infrastructure Division (BIO) and to focus on supporting the Arabidopsis plant genome program. This resulted in Dilworth working alongside DeLill Nasser to create multiple research projects within the NSF, including the Multinational Coordinated Arabidopsis thaliana Genome Research Project, the International Arabidopsis genome sequencing program and the Arabidopsis 2020 Project. Taking a nine-month sabbatical at the end of 1996 to return to Japan, she spent the time at Riken as a visiting fellow funded by the Japan Science and Technology Agency. The purpose of the fellowship grant was to have her determine the current state of biotechnology research in Japan at various public and private institutions.

This time period coincided with the United States government proposing the funding of the National Plant Genome Initiative, which Clutter accepted and had Dilworth begin work on creating the Plant Genome Research Program when she returned under the new funding system. The research served as a collaboration between the USDA and the DOE. Dilworth was also promoted in 1997 to acting division director for the Division of Biological Infrastructure and was made permanent in the position by 1999. In 2007, she left her position in NSF's biology divisions and ended up being made the science and technology attaché at the US embassy in Tokyo, while also being made the head of the NSF's Tokyo Office from 2007 until 2010. She used this opportunity to try and increase the number of Japanese women involved in STEM fields in Japan. After, she returned to the United States to become the acting executive officer for the NSF's Mathematical and Physical Sciences division from 2010 until 2011 and then top leadership in the NSF as head of the Office of International Science and Engineering from 2011 until 2012.

Officially leaving the NSF in June 2012, Dilworth retired to Hawaii to join her husband's new home. She then took up a part time position as a senior adviser for the University of Hawaii at Hilo's Office of the Chancellor while otherwise remaining retired. During this time period, she served remotely as a member of the board of directors and the Scientific Advisory Board for the Boyce Thompson Institute. She returned to a working position, however, in 2015 after the creation of the Okinawa Institute of Science and Technology Graduate University to become the vice president for gender equality. This position allowed her to continue her previous efforts of increasing the number of Japanese women joining STEM fields. She then retired again in 2019.

== Research ==
After her graduate work on gibberellins, her postdoctoral work moved to Agrostemma and the biochemistry involved in the genetic component of nitrate metabolism and hormonal impacts of nitrate that then leads to germination of the plant's seeds. Once she had changed to a UGA lab, her research swapped to cottonseed and how the germinating seeds' storage proteins control their amino acid metabolism. The Gantt lab saw her focus on Porphyridium cruentum and the biochemistry of its phycobilisomes.

== Organizations ==
Dilworth joined the American Society of Plant Biologists in the late 1960s and went on to become a founding member of the group's Legacy Society.

== Personal life ==
Dilworth met her husband, Greg Dilworth, while working on her Ph.D. at UCLA and they married the day after she successfully defended her thesis.
