= Marianne Bronner =

Hungarian developmental biologist (born 1952)

Marianne E. Bronner
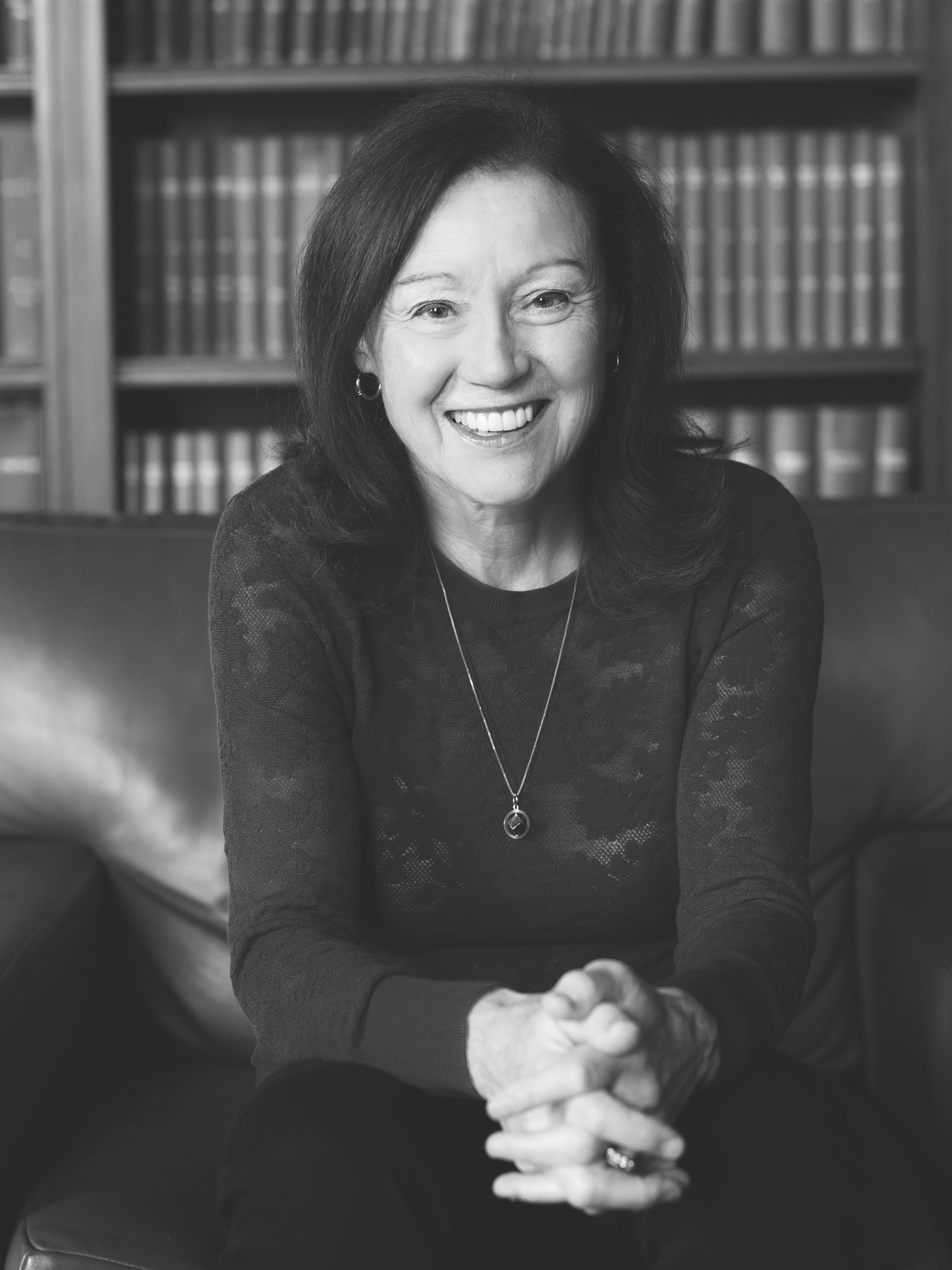
- Born: December 1952 (age 73); Budapest, Hungary
- Other name: Marianne Bronner-Fraser

Academic background
- Education: Brown University (Sc.B., 1975); Johns Hopkins University (PhD., 1979)
- Thesis: Migratory pattern and developmental potential of cloned neural crest cells injected into host chicken embryos (1979)

Marianne Elizabeth Bronner (born December 1952) is a Hungarian-American developmental biologist who currently serves as Edward B. Lewis Professor of Biology and an executive officer for Neurobiology at the California Institute of Technology. Her most notable work includes her research on the neural crest. focusing on the study of cellular events behind the migration, differentiation, and formation of neural crest cells. She currently directs her own laboratory at the California Institute of Technology called the Bronner Laboratory, and she has authored over 400 articles in her field.

== Early years ==
Bronner was born in Budapest, Hungary in 1952 to parents who were both survivors of the Holocaust. When she was four, the Hungarian Revolution of 1956 prompted her family to flee Hungary into Austria, where they stayed for six months before immigrating to the United States.

== Education and career ==
Bronner attended Brown University for her undergraduate studies in 1971. After she graduated from Brown University in 1975, she decided to apply to the biophysics graduate school program at Johns Hopkins University. Once there, she decided to take an undergraduate course in developmental biology, joining Alan Cohen's laboratory. From there, she continued to specialise in the field, completing her thesis in 1977 on neural crest cell developmental potential by injecting an individual quail neural crest cell (which Cohen had cloned) into a chicken embryo and studying how the cell developed.

Once Bronner graduated from Johns Hopkins University with her Ph.D. in 1979, she began teaching at the University of California, Irvine. Bronner spent 16 years at the university teaching and researching and eventually became the associate director of the Developmental Biology Center.

In 1988, Bronner and her husband, fellow biophysicist Scott E. Fraser, did a study that showed neural crest cells being multipotent in an embryo for the first time. A similar study in 2015 via different methods showed similar results.

She was promoted to a Professor at University of California, Irvine in 1990.

In 1996, Bronner left the University of California, Irvine and moved her laboratory to the California Institute of Technology. In 2001, Bronner became Chair of the Faculty at the California Institute of Technology, being the first woman to hold the position. She held that position for two years before becoming the director of the Beckman Institute at the California Institute of Technology in 2019.

== The Bronner Laboratory ==
Bronner has been directing a laboratory at the California Institute of Technology since she first arrived at the university. The lab focuses most of its research on how neural crest cells arise, the factors involving their migration from the neural tube to different positions in the embryo, and the evolution of these cells. One project focuses on characterizing the structures involved with neural crest cell movements. Another project in the lab focuses on comparing the mechanisms behind neural crest invasive behavior and the mechanisms that allow for adult derivatives to become migratory and invasive.

== Personal life ==
Bonner married Scott E. Fraser, a fellow biophysicist, whom she worked with on several studies. She has two children, and was one of the few women in her fields to be a mother in addition to her work.

== Awards and honors ==
- Vilcek Prize in Biomedical Science (2025)
- Elected member, National Academy of Sciences (2015)
- American Academy of Arts & Science, Fellow (2009)
- Edwin G. Conklin Medal from the Society for Developmental Biology (2013)
- Women in Cell Biology Senior Leadership Award (2012)
- BUSAC Award for Excellence in Teaching (2001 & 2005)
- Javits Neuroscience Investigator Award from the National Institute Of Neurological Disorders And Stroke (2002–2009)
- ASCIT Award for Excellence in Teaching (1997 & 1998)
- Distinguished Research Award from the University of California, Irvine (1994)

== Professional societies ==
- Bekman Institute at California Institution of Technology, director (2019–present)
- International Society for Differentiation, president (2013–2014)
- International Society for Developmental Biology, secretary (2010–2013)
- Gordon Research Conferences, board of directors (2006–2013), chair (2012)
- Society for Developmental Biology, president (2009)
- Sontag Foundation, scientific advisory board member (2006–present)
- American Society for Cell Biology, council member (1994–1997)

== Selected publications ==
- Rogers CD, Saxena A, Bronner ME. Sip1 mediates an E-cadherin-to-N-cadherin switch during cranial neural crest EMT. J. Cell Biol. 2013 Dec 9;203(5):835-47. doi: 10.1083/jcb.201305050. Epub 2013 Dec 2.
- Barembaum, M. and Bronner, M. E. (2013) Identification and dissection of a key enhancer mediating cranial neural crest specific expression of transcription factor, Ets-1. Dev. Biol. (in press).
- Hochgreb-Hägele, T. and Bronner, M.E. (2013) Zebrafish stem/progenitor factor msi2b exhibits two phases of activity mediated by different splice variants. Stem Cells (in press).
- Simões-Costa M, Bronner ME. (2013) Insights into neural crest development and evolution from genommic analysis. Genome Res. 23, 1069-80
- Saxena, A., Peng, B. and Bronner, M.E. (2013) Sox10-dependent neural crest origin for olfactory microvillous neurons. eLife e00336.
- Smith, J., et al., (2013) Sequencing of the sea lamprey (Petromyzon marinus) genome provides insights into vertebrate evolution. Nat Genet. 45, 415–21.
- Simões-Costa, M.*, McKeown, S.*, Tan-Cabugoa, J., Sauka-Spengler, T. and Bronner, M.E. (2012) Dynamic and differential regulation of stem cell factor FoxD3 in the neural crest is encrypted in the genome PLoS. Genetics e1003142.
- Green SA, Bronner ME. (2012) Gene duplication and the early evolution of neural crest development. Semin Cell Dev Biol. S1084-9521(12)00230-3
- Hu, N., Strobl-Mazzulla, P., Sauka-Spengler, T., Bronner, M.E. (2012) DNA methyltransferase3A as a molecular switch mediating the neural tube to neural crest fate transition. Genes and Development 26, 2380–5.
