= Gladfelter =

Gladfelter is a surname. Notable people with the surname include:

- Amy Gladfelter (born 1974), American cell biologist
- Irl A. Gladfelter (born 1944), American Lutheran archbishop
- Millard E. Gladfelter (1900–1995), American academic administrator
