= Frances Brodsky =

American cell biologist

Professor Frances Brodsky DPhil FMedSci
- Education: Harvard University; University of Oxford
- Known for: Studies of clathrin and vesicle trafficking
- Scientific career
- Workplaces: University College, London; University of California, San Francisco
- Doctoral advisor: Walter Bodmer; Jack Strominger

Frances Brodsky is an American cell biologist. She is known for her work on clathrin and its role in the function of the immune system. She is a professor of cell biology and the director of the Division of Biosciences (part of the Faculty of Life Sciences) at University College London. She is the author of three scientific mystery novels under the pseudonym B.B. Jordan. She was the founding editor of the journal Traffic.

== Education ==
Brodsky earned her B.Sc. in biochemistry from Harvard University in 1976. She received a Marshall Scholarship to study in the UK and performed research in the laboratory of Walter Bodmer at Oxford University, obtaining a D. Phil. (Oxford's term for a Ph.D.) in 1979.

== Career ==
After postdoctoral work at Harvard University and Stanford University, Brodsky joined Becton Dickinson as a program manager in cell biology in 1982. In 1987, she returned to academia as an assistant professor in the Department of Pharmacy and Pharmaceutical Chemistry at the University of California, San Francisco.

Brodsky's work straddles the interface of immunology and cell biology. She developed some of the first monoclonal antibodies to the major histocompatibility complex, a protein that is central to the immune system. She became interested in clathrin, a protein that is key to both inward and outward membrane trafficking in cells, shortly after its isolation by Barbara Pearse. She used monoclonal antibodies to map the structure of clathrin and to probe its assembly into its characteristic polyhedral structures. Clathrin-mediated endocytosis is involved in the uptake of antigens from outside the cell that are eventually presented on the surface of the cell by the major histocompatibility complex class II (MHC class II). Brodsky discovered that the pathway of MHC class II export meets the antigen import pathway in a specialized endocytic compartment where antigens can be processed into peptides and loaded onto the MHC class II molecule for presentation. She also identified the site at which peptides are loaded onto MHC class I proteins.

Brodsky has been a leader in analyzing the regulation of clathrin assembly and the adaptor proteins that help capture specific cargoes in clathrin-coated vesicles. She has identified roles for clathrin isoforms in diseases such as diabetes and myopathies, and in controlling immunoglobulin class switching.

In 2000, she founded Traffic: The International Journal of Intracellular Transport with Mark Marsh, Sandra Schmid, and Thomas Kreis, with the goal of creating "a central journal to gather together publications that are of most interest to those working on intracellular trafficking". In 2007, she stepped aside from the role of co-Editor to become Reviews Editor of Traffic.

In 2015, after 28 years at UCSF, Brodsky moved back to the UK to lead the Division of Biosciences at University College London.

In 2019, she was elected to the council of the Academy of Medical Sciences.

In 2025, Brodsky was elected to the American Academy of Arts and sciences in the field of cellular and developmental biology.

== Awards ==
- 1976 Marshall Scholarship
- 1988 Pew Scholar award
- 2007 WICB Senior Award
- 2015 Fellow of the Academy of Medical Sciences

== Mystery novels ==
Brodsky is the author of three mystery novels starring virologist Dr. Celeste Braun, all published by Berkley Prime Crime, under the pseudonym B.B. Jordan. In Principal Investigation (1997), Braun foils a criminal who is threatening to cause an outbreak of a deadly virus; in Secondary Immunization (1999) she uncovers a conspiracy that uses the immune systems of patients to carry information for a drug cartel; and in Triplet Code (2001) she solves the mystery of the deaths of three colleagues.
