= Stephen Quake =

American scientist, inventor and entrepreneur (born 1969)

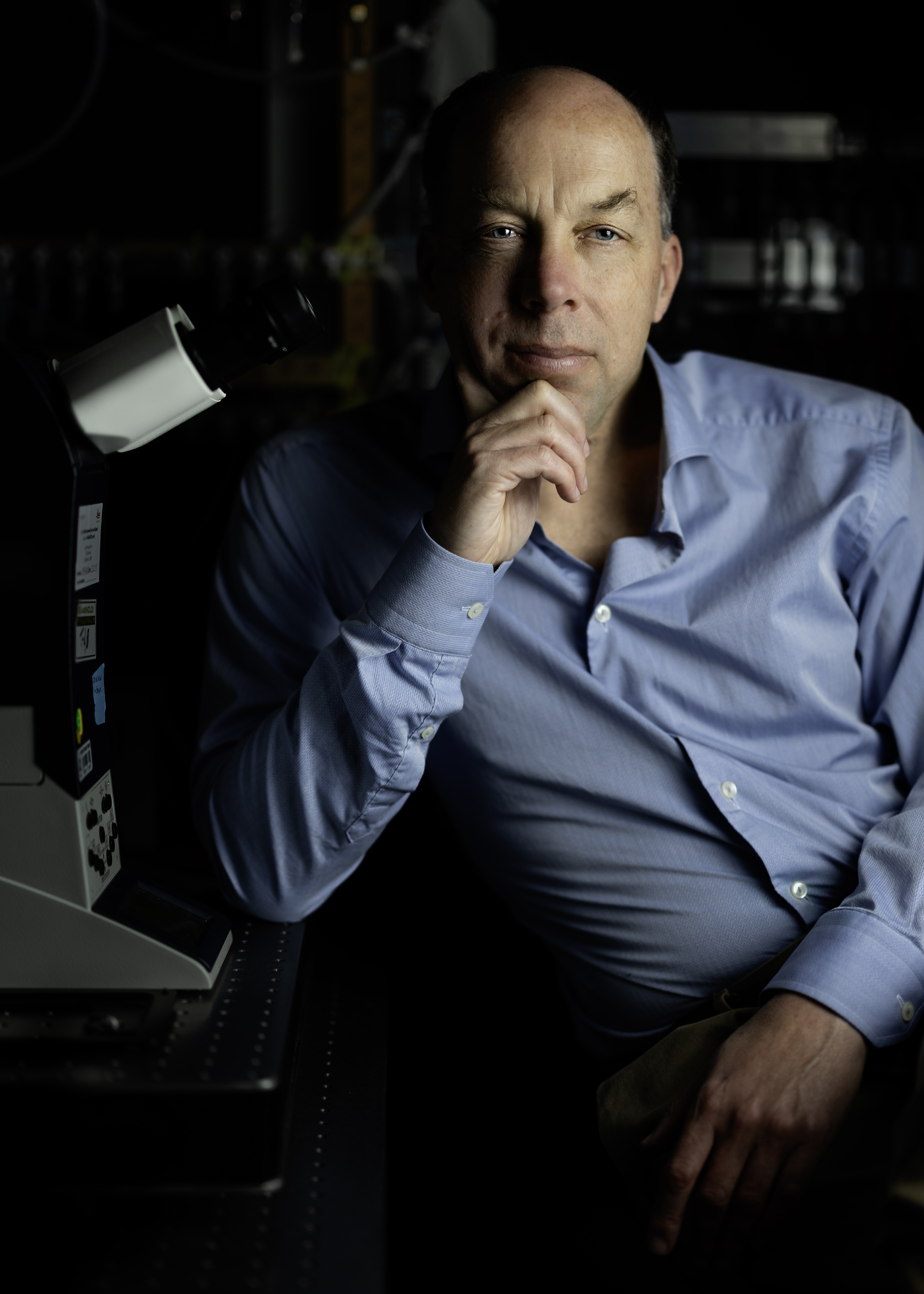
- Quake in 2024
- Born: 1969 (age 56–57)
- Education: Stanford University (BS, MS); University of Oxford (DPhil)
- Known for: Microfluidics, genomics
- Awards: Lemelson–MIT Prize (2012); Gabbay Award (2015)
- Scientific career
- Fields: Biophysics, genomics
- Workplaces: Stanford University; Cornell University
- Thesis: Theory and experiments in polymer physics with single molecules of DNA (1994)
- Academic advisors: Robin Stinchcombe, Steven Chu

Stephen Ronald Quake (born 1969) is an American physicist, inventor, and entrepreneur, known for developing microfluidic large-scale integration and for innovations in genomics and molecular diagnostics. He pioneered several liquid biopsy diagnostics, including noninvasive prenatal testing (NIPT), novel tests for organ transplant rejection, infectious disease, and cancer. His work, using microfluidics at the interface of cell biology and genomics, led to the development of new tools for single-cell genomics, which he then applied to the creation of whole-organism transcriptomic cell atlases.

== Early life and education ==
Quake earned his B.S. in physics and M.S. in mathematics from Stanford in 1991, and his D.Phil. in theoretical physics from Oxford University in 1994 as a Marshall Scholar. His thesis research was in statistical mechanics and the topological effects of knots on polymers. He did his postdoctoral work at Stanford in single-molecule biophysics with Steven Chu.

== Academic career ==
Quake joined the faculty of the California Institute of Technology in 1996 at the age of 26, where he rose through the ranks and was ultimately appointed the Thomas and Doris Everhart Professor of Applied Physics and Physics. He moved back to Stanford University in 2005 to help launch a new department in Bioengineering, where he was the Lee Otterson Professor and held appointments in Applied Physics (and by courtesy, Physics) through 2026. From 2006 to 2016, he was an Investigator of the Howard Hughes Medical Institute. He has held honorary faculty positions such as the Andrew D. White Professor-at-Large at Cornell University and Non-resident Fellow at the Salk Institute, and has been a visiting professor at the Collège de France and ESPCI. In May 2026, Quake was appointed Professor of Biophysics and Biomedical Engineering in the Department of Biosystems Science and Engineering (D-BSSE) at ETH Zurich in Basel, Switzerland.

== Research and contributions ==
=== Microfluidics and large-scale integration ===
Quake developed the biological equivalent of the integrated circuit through the development of microfluidics, also known as a "lab on a chip." He invented multilayer soft-lithography devices, made from elastomer, which have integrated valves and pumps to control fluids. He and colleagues then demonstrated microfluidic large-scale integration (mLSI), packing thousands of addressable valves onto a single chip to route, mix, meter, and store tiny liquid volumes for complex workflows. Using these platforms, his lab built high-throughput tools for biophysics and structural biology, including microfluidic methods for protein crystallization and for measuring transcription-factor binding energy landscapes across many sequences in parallel. His microfluidic discoveries also formed the basis of the first technologies to automate single-cell genomics and transcriptomics.

=== Non-Invasive Prenatal Diagnostics (NIPT) ===
A central theme of Quake's genomics work is diagnostics built by counting individual DNA or RNA molecules rather than averaging ensemble signals. In 2008, his team showed that noninvasive prenatal testing (NIPT) could detect fetal chromosomal aneuploidies by shotgun sequencing fragments of cell-free DNA in maternal blood. In 2012, they reported that the fetal genome could be inferred from a maternal blood sample, illustrating how sequencing and computation can replace invasive procedures.

=== Cell-free DNA in transplantation ===
The group extended cell-free DNA analysis to transplant medicine, demonstrating that a rise in donor-derived DNA in a recipient's plasma provides a universal, noninvasive signal of organ rejection.

=== Single-cell methods and lineage reconstruction ===
Quake's lab helped benchmark single-cell RNA-sequencing methods and used them to map how cells in tissues change during development and disease. They also showed that single-cell data could reconstruct cellular lineages in mammalian tissues, providing a template for later atlas efforts.

=== Cell atlases and open resources ===
Building on these methods, Quake co-led Tabula Muris and Tabula Sapiens, large consortia that profiled hundreds of thousands of cells across mouse and human organs, and released open datasets and tools that became community reference resources.

=== AI and computational biology ===
Recent work explores machine learning and foundation models that learn universal representations of cells across species, aiming to make cross-tissue and cross-organism comparisons as routine as sequence alignment.

== Leadership and service ==
=== Founding and building the Chan Zuckerberg Biohub Network (2016–2025) ===
In 2016, Quake co-founded the Chan Zuckerberg Biohub (San Francisco) as a university–nonprofit collaboration linking UCSF, UC Berkeley, and Stanford University, and served as co-president with Joe DeRisi to establish investigator programs, internal research groups, and shared technology platforms. Quake then served as founding president of the CZ Biohub Network and launched new Biohub institutes in Chicago (with the University of Chicago, Northwestern, and UIUC) and New York (Columbia, Rockefeller, Yale).

=== Head of Science at the Chan Zuckerberg Initiative (2022–2025) ===
In June 2022, Quake was named Head of Science at the Chan Zuckerberg Initiative, overseeing grant programs, technology development, and the Biohub network's scientific integration. He led CZI's pivot towards AI-enabled biology, launching their internal AI program and building their first GPU compute cluster.

=== University and community service ===
At Stanford University, Quake helped build and lead the Bioengineering department, where he served a term as co-chair. He held a joint appointment in Applied Physics, served on numerous national committees, and has been a champion of open science. The CZ Biohub was the first institution to require the use of preprints for all of its publications, and at CZI, Quake led the creation and funding of OpenRxiv, which established bioRxiv and medRxiv as an independent non-profit organization. In the non-profit world, Quake currently serves as a trustee of the Carnegie Institution for Science and is a director of the Institute for Protein Innovation and of the 23andMe Research Institute.

== Honors and awards ==
Quake is one of roughly two dozen people to have been elected to all of the National Academies in the United States, including the National Academy of Science, the National Academy of Engineering, the National Academy of Medicine, and the National Academy of Inventors. He has also been elected as a fellow of the Royal Society, the American Physical Society, the American Institute for Medical and Biological Engineering, and the American Academy of Arts and Sciences.

He received the NIH Director's Pioneer Award (2004), the Lemelson–MIT Prize (2012), the Jacob Heskel Gabbay Award (2015), the Max Delbrück Prize in Biological Physics (2016), the Tel Aviv University International Prize in Biophysics, and the Royal Society of Chemistry's Pioneer of Miniaturization Award (2010). He was named a Clarivate Citation Laureate in Physics (2022).

== Entrepreneurship ==
Quake has been active in translating laboratory innovations into widely used tools and diagnostics through a series of biotechnology companies. Early in his career, he founded Fluidigm (now Standard BioTools) to commercialize the integrated microfluidic circuits developed in his lab. Based on his lab's work on single-molecule sequencing, he founded Helicos Biosciences, which created the first commercial single-molecule DNA sequencer; Quake used this platform to sequence and publish his own genome as one of the first handful of human genomes available. After his lab demonstrated the first NIPT approach, he co-founded Verinata Health, which was later acquired by Illumina. Work from his group on transplant diagnostics helped found a business later acquired by CareDx in order to launch their cell-free DNA test. More recently, he co-founded Karius to bring noninvasive infectious disease tests into the clinic. His interests in single-cell biology also led to startups such as Quanticel Pharmaceuticals (acquired by Celgene) and Cellular Research (acquired by Becton, Dickinson and Company).
