= Joseph DeRisi =

American biochemist

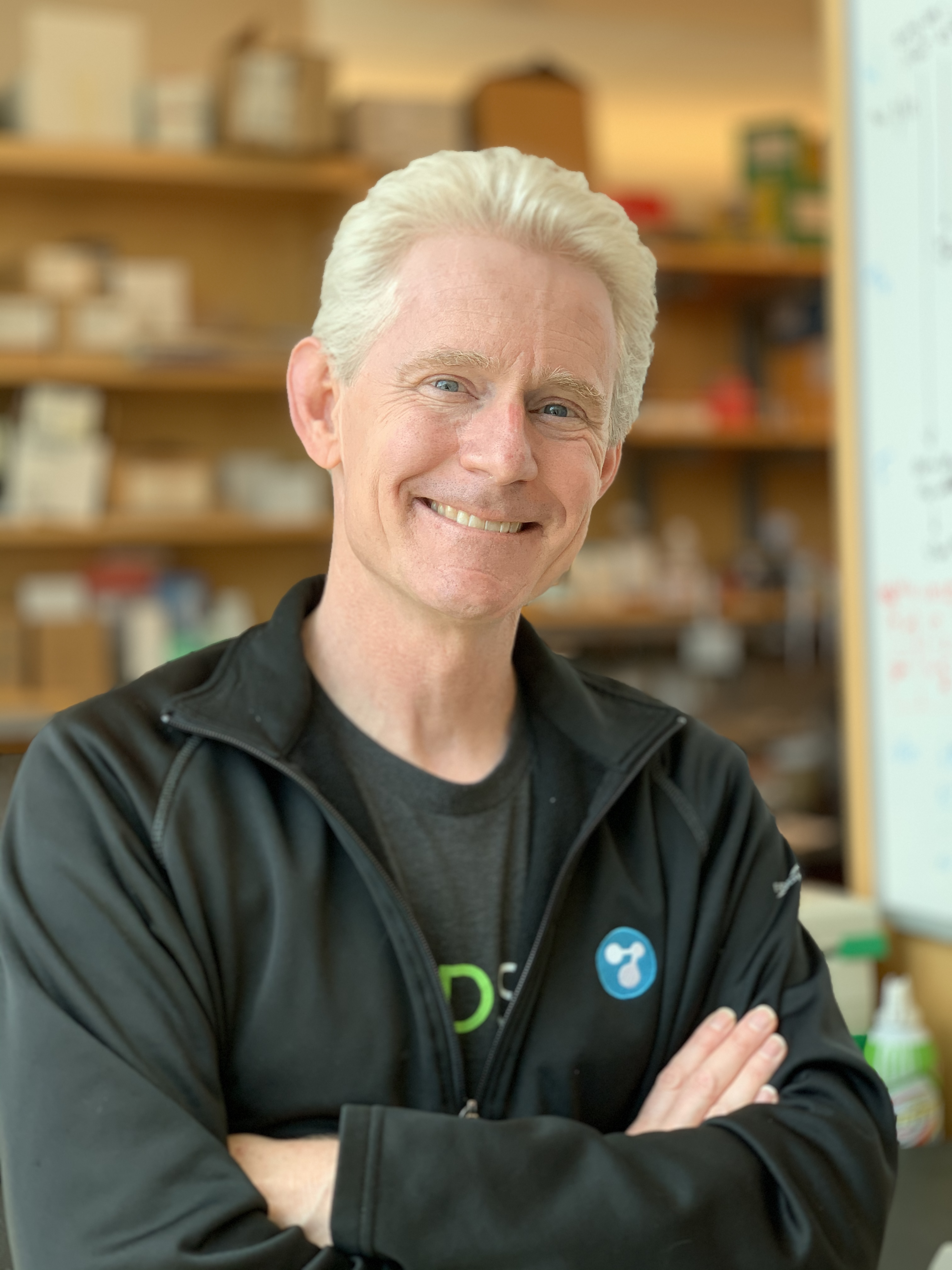
- Education: Stanford University; University of California, Santa Cruz
- Known for: ViroChip, work on identifying SARS virus, gene expression in Plasmodium falciparum
- Scientific career
- Fields: Biology
- Workplaces: University of California, San Francisco Howard Hughes Medical Institute
- Thesis: The Analysis of whole genome gene expression in the budding yeast Saccharomyces cerevisiae. (1999)
- Doctoral advisor: Patrick O. Brown

Joseph Lyman DeRisi is an American biochemist, specializing in molecular biology, parasitology, genomics, virology, and computational biology.

== Early life and education ==
DeRisi was raised in Carmichael, California, where he graduated from Del Campo High School. He received a B.A. in biochemistry and molecular biology in 1992 from the University of California, Santa Cruz.

DeRisi earned his Ph.D. in biochemistry from Stanford University in 1999. Working in the laboratory of Patrick O. Brown, he developed methods for the production and use of DNA microarrays in molecular biology, and his thesis was a genome-wide expression analysis of the budding yeast S. cerevisiae. Upon graduation, DeRisi accepted a position as a Sandler Fellow at the University of California San Francisco.

== Career and research ==
DeRisi has been a faculty member of the UCSF biochemistry and biophysics department since 1999. As of 2022 he is a professor of biochemistry and biophysics and is also the director of UCSF's Sandler Program for Breakthrough Biomedical Research.

DeRisi is known for printing the first whole-genome expression array, performing the first broad analysis of differential gene expression in cancer cells, profiling gene expression throughout the lifecycle of the malaria-causing protozoan Plasmodium falciparum, genomic characterization of the SARS-CoV-1 virus, and pioneering virus discovery using gene hybridization arrays and DNA sequencing technologies.

In his early career, DeRisi was a pioneer of microarrays, and designed and built both hardware and software for microarrays. He was a proponent of open access to microarray technology, and maintained a website with software and protocols for microarray operations. He is also a proponent of open access publishing.

In 2002, DeRisi and his research collaborator David Wang developed the ViroChip, a DNA microarray that could be used to rapidly identify viruses in a sample of blood or tissue. He used the tool to help identify the SARS-CoV-1 virus in 2003. In 2004, DeRisi was named a MacArthur fellow for his work with ViroChip and genomic diagnostic techniques.

DeRisi became a Howard Hughes Medical Institute (HHMI) investigator in 2005, and received financial support from HHMI for his research. He remained an investigator until 2016.

DeRisi and his colleagues employ metagenomic next-generation sequencing (mNGS) for various applications including the identification of causal agents for cases of infectious encephalitis, meningitis, and discrimination between autoimmune and infectious causes - diagnosing cases that are difficult to decipher using traditional clinical laboratory techniques. Using metagenomic sequencing, DeRisi has identified disease-causing viruses in humans, and in animals ranging from parrots and cockatiels to honeybees and boa constrictors. He and a research partner, Don Ganem, have identified a parasite, Nosema ceranae, that appears to be responsible for colony collapse among honeybees. He has also de-bunked the relation of viruses to certain subsets of human cancer.

DeRisi and his colleague Dr. Michael Wilson used a phage display to screen antibody samples from patients with autoimmune symptoms against a library of human proteins, allowing them to identify a cancer-associated autoantigen that is the cause of the symptoms.

DeRisi’s lab at UCSF also conducts research to understand the genetics of the malaria-causing pathogen Plasmodium falciparum, the causative agent of the most deadly form of human malaria. DeRisi's group has developed candidate drugs to cure malaria. In 2011, the group determined the function of the apicoplast, a unique organelle in apicomplexans, identifying the target of an anti-malarial drug that was a preclinical candidate.

In 2016, DeRisi became the co-president of the newly established CZ Biohub, alongside Stephen Quake. After joining CZ Biohub, DeRisi established a team of developers to create a cloud-based metagenomic diagnostic platform based on code from his lab at UCSF. The platform, then named IDSeq, was initially launched for testing by a small group in 2018. The development and computing costs were backed by the Chan Zuckerberg Initiative and CZ Biohub. The platform is used to rapidly identify pathogens from metagenomic sequencing data, and as of 2022 is known as CZ-ID.

In 2020, early in the COVID-19 pandemic, DeRisi led a team that turned an empty lab space adjacent to the CZ Biohub into a CLIA-certified COVID-19 testing facility in eight days. CLIAhub became one of the nation's leading COVID-19 testing centers, processing thousands of tests per day and becoming a model for the nation. DeRisi’s early warning of the pandemic and development of rapid testing technology was documented by Michael Lewis in his book The Premonition: A Pandemic Story. At the same time, DeRisi became an active proponent of developing a national COVID-19 surveillance system to identify and monitor mutations in the COVID-19 virus.

== Awards and honors ==
- 2001 Searle Scholar Award, The Searle Scholars Program, Northbrook IL
- 2001 JP Morgan Chase Health Award, The Tech Museum of Innovation, San Jose CA
- 2002 Gordon Tomkins Chair of Biochemistry and Biophysics, University of California, San Francisco
- 2003 Packard Fellowship for Science and Engineering, David and Lucile Packard Foundation, Los Altos, CA
- 2004 MacArthur Fellowship, The John D. and Catherine T. MacArthur Foundation, Chicago, IL
- 2004 Wired RAVE Award, Health and Medicine, WIRED Magazine, San Francisco, CA
- 2005 BayBio Scientific Achievement Award, BayBio, San Francisco, CA
- 2006 Alumni Achievement Award, University of California, Santa Cruz, Santa Cruz, CA
- 2007 Chabot Science Award, Chabot Space & Science Center, Oakland, CA
- 2008 The 14th Annual Heinz Award for Technology, the Economy and Employment, Pittsburgh, PA
- 2014 The John J. Carty Award for the Advancement of Science from the National Academy of Sciences
- Eli Lilly and Company Research Award Laureate

And Membership in scientific organizations would contain:

- 2013 Elected fellow of the California Academy of Sciences
- 2013 Elected fellow of the Academy of the American Society of Microbiology.
- 2015 Elected to the American Academy of Arts and Sciences
- 2016 Elected as a member of the National Academy of Sciences
- 2016 Elected as a member of the National Academy of Medicine
