= Eva Nogales =

Spanish-American biophysicist

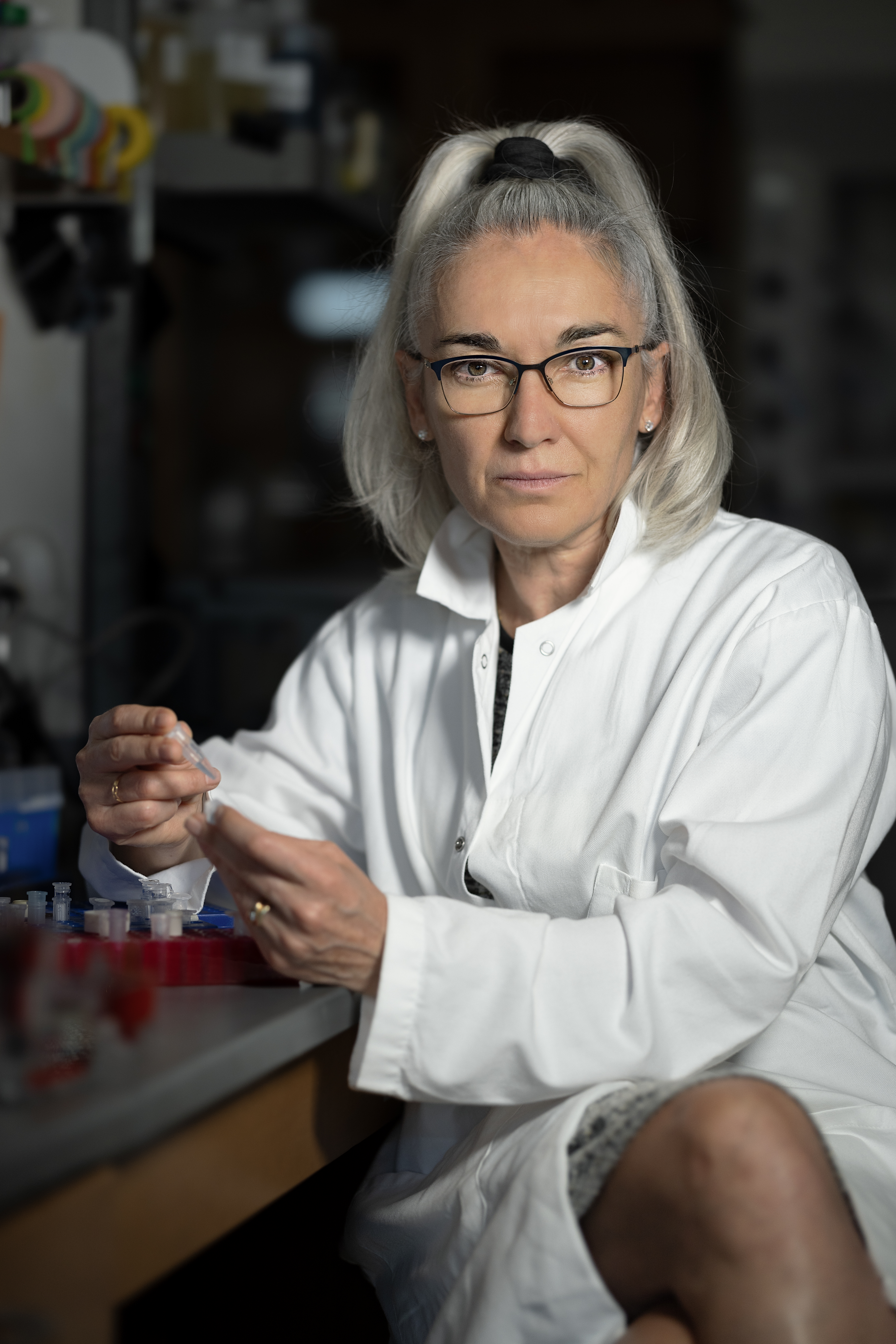
- Nogales in 2023
- Born: May 16, 1965 (age 61); Colmenar Viejo, Madrid, Spain
- Education: Autonomous University of Madrid (B.S.); University of Keele (PhD)
- Occupations: Biophysicist, professor
- Known for: The first to determine the atomic structure of tubulin by electron crystallography
- Spouse: Howard Padmore
- Children: 2
- Awards: Early Career Award, American Society for Cell Biology (2005); Chabot Science Award for Excellence (2006); Shaw Prize (2023)
- Scientific career
- Workplaces: University of California, Berkeley, Howard Hughes Medical Institute, Synchrotron Radiation Source

Eva Nogales (born May 16, 1965) is a Spanish-American biophysicist at the Lawrence Berkeley National Laboratory and a professor at the University of California, Berkeley, where she served as head of the Division of Biochemistry, Biophysics and Structural Biology of the Department of Molecular and Cell Biology (2015–2020). She is a Howard Hughes Medical Institute investigator.

Nogales is a pioneer in using electron microscopy for the structural and functional characterization of macromolecular complexes. She used electron crystallography to obtain the first structure of tubulin and identify the binding site of the important anti-cancer drug taxol. She is a involved in work combining cryo-EM, computational image analysis and biochemical assays to gain insights into function and regulation of biological complexes and molecular machines. Her work has uncovered aspects of cellular function that are relevant to the treatment of cancer and other diseases.

== Early life and education ==
Eva Nogales obtained her BS degree in physics from the Autonomous University of Madrid in 1988. She later earned her PhD from the University of Keele in 1992 while working at the Synchrotron Radiation Source under the supervision of Joan Bordas.

== Career ==
During her post-doctoral work in the laboratory of Ken Downing at the Lawrence Berkeley National Laboratory, Eva Nogales was the first to determine the atomic structure of tubulin and the location of the taxol-binding site by electron crystallography. She became an assistant professor in the Department of Molecular and Cell Biology at the University of California, Berkeley in 1998. In 2000 she became an investigator in the Howard Hughes Medical Institute. As cryo-EM techniques became more powerful, she became a leader in applying cryo-EM to the study of microtubule structure and function and other large macromolecular assemblies such as eukaryotic transcription and translation initiation complexes, the polycomb complex PRC2, and telomerase.

== Selected publications ==
- Nogales, Eva; Whittaker, Michael; Milligan, Ronald A.; Downing, Kenneth H. (January 1999). "High-Resolution Model of the Microtubule". Cell. 96 (1): 79–88. doi:10.1016/s0092-8674(00)80961-7. ISSN 0092-8674. PMID 9989499.
- Löwe, J.; Li, H.; Downing, K. H.; Nogales, E. (November 9, 2001). "Refined structure of αβ-tubulin at 3.5 Å resolution11Edited by I. A. Wilson". Journal of Molecular Biology. 313 (5): 1045–1057. doi:10.1006/jmbi.2001.5077. ISSN 0022-2836. PMID 11700061.
- Nogales, Eva (June 1, 2001). "Structural Insights into Microtubule Function". Annual Review of Biophysics and Biomolecular Structure. 30 (1): 397–420. doi:10.1146/annurev.biophys.30.1.397. ISSN 1056-8700. PMID 11441808.

== Awards ==
- 2000: investigator, Howard Hughes Medical Institute
- 2005: Early Career Life Scientist Award, American Society for Cell Biology
- 2006: Chabot Science Award for Excellence
- 2015: Dorothy Crowfoot Hodgkin Award, Protein Society
- 2015: Elected as a member of the US National Academy of Sciences
- 2016: Elected to the American Academy of Arts and Sciences
- 2018: Women in Cell Biology Award (Senior), American Society for Cell Biology
- 2019: Grimwade Medal for Biochemistry.
- 2021: AAAS Fellows Award.
- 2023: Shaw Prize in Life Sciences.
- 2025: Foreign Member of the Royal Society.

== Personal life ==
Nogales is married to Howard Padmore and they have two children.
