= Chan Zuckerberg Biohub =

American nonprofit research organization

- Parent institution: Chan Zuckerberg Initiative
- Established: 2016; 10 years ago
- President: Joseph DeRisi
- Endowment: US$600 million
- Location: Mission Bay, San Francisco, California, United States
- Coordinates: 37°45′57″N 122°23′16″W
- Interactive map of Chan Zuckerberg Biohub
- Website: www.czbiohub.org

Chan Zuckerberg Biohub (CZ Biohub), or simply Biohub, is a nonprofit research organization. In addition to supporting and conducting original research, CZ Biohub acts as a hub and fosters science collaboration between UC Berkeley, UC San Francisco (UCSF) and Stanford. The Biohub is funded by a $600 million contribution from Meta CEO and founder Mark Zuckerberg and his wife Priscilla Chan. It was co-led by Stephen Quake and Joseph DeRisi from its inception in 2016 until 2022, when Quake left to become president of the Biohub Network. Sandra Schmid joined as Chief Scientific Officer in 2020.

== History ==
The idea for CZ Biohub originated in 2015 when DeRisi and Quake, along with Chan and Zuckerberg, agreed on the need for a collaborative alliance of Stanford University, UC San Francisco and UC Berkeley devoted to fundamental biomedical research. The organization was established in 2016, funded by a $600 million endowment from Chan and Zuckerberg. DeRisi and Quake led the organization as co-presidents for the first five years, before Quake became the president of the CZ Biohub Network when that initiative launched in 2022. Gajus Worthington was named as Biohub's chief operating officer in 2017; he left the position in 2022.

In 2017, CZ Biohub selected an initial group of scientists for its first cohort of Investigators, individuals chosen from the three partner universities to each receive $1 million in funding for five years of innovative research in the life sciences. In total, the organization provided $50 million to 47 individuals in research positions working on a range of projects.

In 2021, Chan and Zuckerberg announced that they intended to provide a further $800 million to $1 billion to CZ Biohub over 10 years, extending the organization's funding through 2031.

The organization selected its second cohort of Investigators in 2022. It awarded grants of $1 million each to 86 individual researchers from multiple science and health-related disciplines at Stanford University, UC Berkeley, and UCSF to support five years of research.

== Organization ==
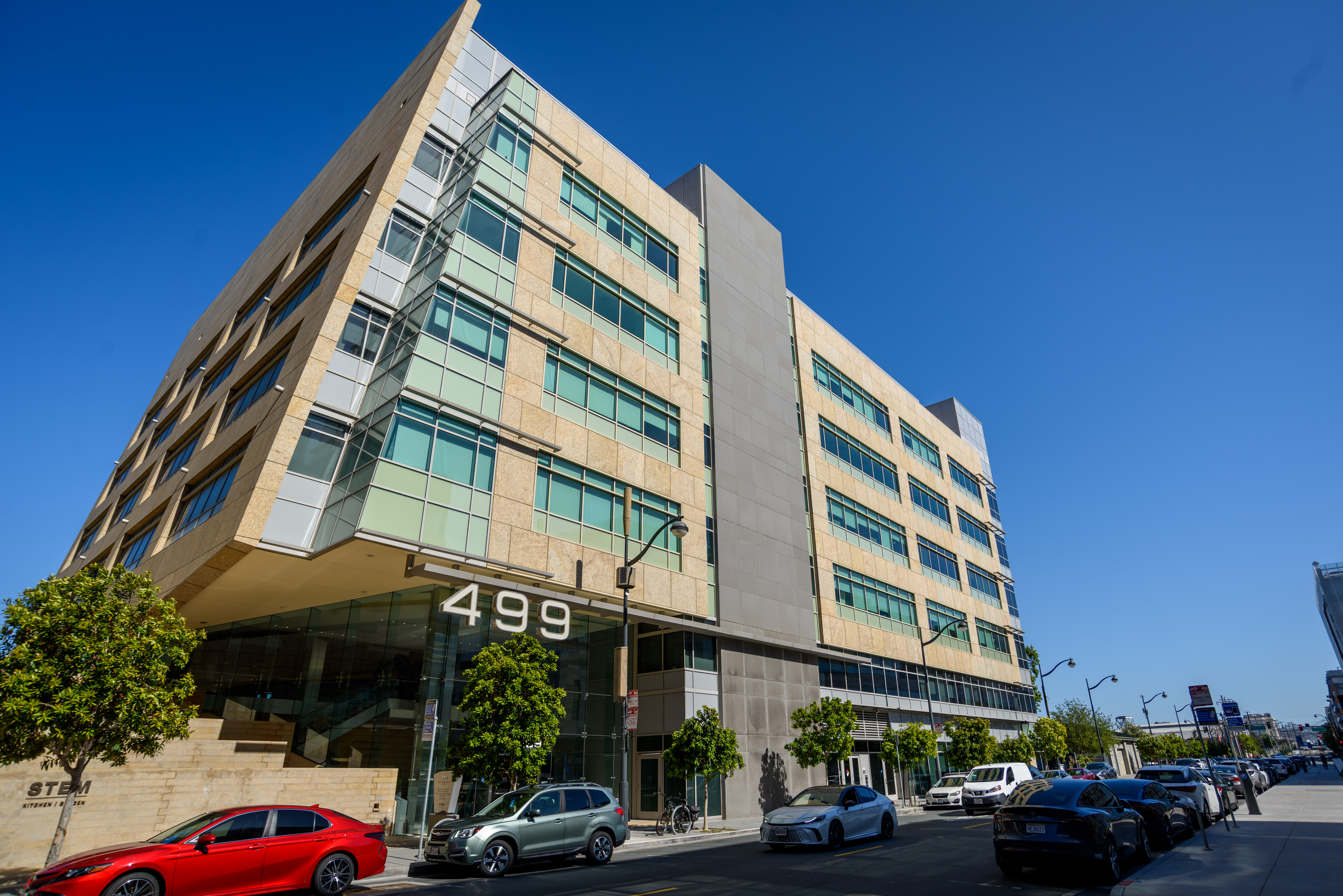
499 Illinois St in San Francisco, California, where the organization is housed.

The Biohub is a non-profit biomedical research organization that was created to support the Chan Zuckerberg Initiative's efforts to cure, prevent, or manage all disease by the end of the century. Its aim is to facilitate collaboration between medical, scientific, and engineering researchers from three Bay Area institutions: Stanford University, the University of California, Berkeley (UC Berkeley), and UC San Francisco (UCSF). It also supports research by its own scientists and engineers in its own facilities. It is organized as both a research institute and a network for researchers to find overlap between their own work and scientists and engineers working in different areas or disciplines, to help accelerate research.

The organization's president is Joseph DeRisi, a professor of Biochemistry and Biophysics at UCSF. DeRisi is known for inventing genomic tools to rapidly identify unknown pathogens, work for which he was named a MacArthur Fellow in 2004. Sandra Schmid joined the organization as its chief scientific officer in 2020. As of 2020, the Biohub had 100 employees including operations staff, scientists, data scientists and engineers. Its headquarters are located In San Francisco, adjacent to UCSF's Mission Bay campus.

=== Research programs ===
The Biohub's research is organized around two main projects: a quantitative approach to cell science, including mapping different types of cells; and an infectious disease initiative, which includes research on infection and immunity as well as developing techniques for early detection of emerging pathogens around the world. Additionally, the organization's technology platform teams develop new technology and tools for biomedical research, and for clinical and public health applications.

The Biohub allocates one third of its funding towards its extramural programs. The Investigator Program provides five years of funding to scientists from a variety of disciplines who are faculty members at Stanford University, UC Berkeley, and UCSF. As a requirement of the program, investigators meet up twice a month to share findings. The meetings are intended to encourage collaboration and accelerate development of scientific and medical advancements through finding commonalities investigators might not otherwise have known about. The investigator grants are unrestricted, and focused on supporting research that may not be sufficiently developed to qualify for funding from the pharmaceutical industry or the National Institutes of Health.

To increase access to scientific research and promote open science, CZ Biohub requires its Investigators and staff scientists to post submitted manuscripts and related data on preprint servers such as bioRxiv at the same time they are submitted to journals for publication.

=== Structure and funding ===
CZ Biohub is structured as a nonprofit, tax-exempt organization, but it has retained close control of the outcomes of its efforts, including patent rights. The Biohub operates independently from CZI but partners with it on some initiatives and programs. In 2016, CZI formed the Biohub with a $600 million endowment over 10 years. In December 2021, CZI announced it was committing up to $1 billion in further funding to support the Biohub's operations through 2031.

== Biohub Network ==
In December 2021, Chan and Zuckerberg announced that they were providing $1 billion in funding to develop a network of Biohubs to focus on their goal of longer-term research over 10 to 15 years into "scientific challenges". The Chan Zuckerberg Biohub Network was launched with the goal of connecting co-located scientific institutions in other areas of the US, beyond the initial CZ Biohub group in the Bay Area, to work together on research into major issues.

Between 2022 and 2025, Stephen Quake was the Head of Science at the Chan Zuckerberg Initiative
