= Donald Ganem =

American physician and virologist

Donald "Don" Emil Ganem is an American physician, virologist, professor emeritus of microbiology and medicine, and the former Global Head of Infectious Diseases Research at Novartis Institutes for BioMedical Research.

== Early life and education ==
Born and raised in northern Massachusetts, Ganem graduated in 1968 from Phillips Academy Andover and in 1972 from Harvard College. After two years of medical school, he took an 18-month leave of absence to work on SV40 DNA replication with George Fareed. In 1977, Ganem graduated with an M.D. from Harvard Medical School. At Peter Bent Brigham Hospital (now Brigham and Women's Hospital), he was a resident and chief resident in internal medicine. At the University of California, San Francisco (UCSF), he did subspecialty training in infectious diseases, working in Harold Varmus's laboratory.

== Career and research ==
Ganem became a faculty member at UCSF in 1982, rising eventually to the rank of Professor of Microbiology & Immunology and Medicine. In 1991, he also became an investigator of the Howard Hughes Medical Institute.

At UCSF, his work initially focused on the molecular basis of Hepatitis B virus (HBV) replication and assembly. This included fundamental studies on the synthesis and assembly of subviral and viral particles, the mechanism of the encapsidation of viral RNA, and detailed analyses of viral reverse transcription, including the first description of how linear viral DNA is formed, which led him to propose the now-accepted idea that linear DNA is the likely precursor to integrated viral genomes. In the mid-1990s, he turned his attention to the study of the virology of Kaposi’s sarcoma (KS), the leading tumor of AIDS patients. After the landmark discovery of genomic fragments of a novel herpesvirus (KSHV) in KS tissue by Moore and Chang, Ganem's lab developed the first system for the growth of KSHV in cell culture. Soon thereafter, the Ganem lab, the Moore and Chang lab, and many subsequent groups independently published strong epidemiologic evidence that KSHV was indeed linked to the development of KS tumors. His later work on KSHV focused on identifying and characterizing the genes expressed in latent and reactivated infections, including those involved in gene regulation, signal transduction, and immune evasion. His studies of viral microRNAs also led his team to discover microRNAs in another family of viruses, the polyomaviruses. Finally, Ganem was also part of a UCSF team (led by Dr. Joseph DeRisi) that developed a highly parallel viral screening system using DNA microarrays (and later, metagenomic DNA sequencing) to identify known and novel viral pathogens in animal and human tissue samples.

In 2011, Ganem left UCSF to become the Global Head of Infectious Diseases Research at Novartis, where he led teams developing novel antivirals for respiratory viruses, HBV, herpesviruses, and polyomaviruses, as well as new antibiotics for multi-resistant gram-negative bacteria. Ganem left Novartis in 2018. In 2020, with Kelly Wong, Ph.D., he co-founded Via Nova Therapeutics, a biotech firm focused on antiviral drug development. He retired from active research in 2024.

== Awards and honors ==
- 2003 — Elected to the Institute of Medicine (now called the National Academy of Medicine)
- 2004 — Elected to the American Academy of Arts and Sciences
- 2006–2007 — President of the American Society for Virology
- 2010 — Elected to the National Academy of Sciences
- 2016 — Awarded the UCSF Medal for distinguished service to the university
