= Traffic (journal) =

- Discipline: Signal transduction
- Language: English
- Edited by: Eric Chevet, Antonella De Matteis, Eeva-Liisa Eskelinen, Hesso Farhan

Publication details
- History: 2000-present
- Publisher: Wiley-Blackwell
- Frequency: Monthly
- Impact factor: 6.215 (2020)

Standard abbreviations
- ISO 4: Traffic

Indexing
- CODEN: TRAFFA
- ISSN: 1398-9219 (print); 1600-0854 (web)
- LCCN: 00244513
- OCLC no.: 43795390

Links
- Journal homepage; Online access; Online archive

Traffic is a monthly, peer-reviewed, scientific journal, which was established in 2000, and is published by Wiley-Blackwell. The online version is at the Wiley Online Library. This journal is co-edited by Eric Chevet, Antonella De Matteis, Eeva-Liisa Eskelinen, and Hesso Farhan. The journal covers all aspects of signal transduction (intracellular transport) in health and disease, for both mammalian and non-mammalian biological systems.

== History ==
The journal was established by Frances Brodsky, Mark Marsh, Sandra Schmid, and Thomas Kreis. Kreis died in a plane crash before the first issue was published.

== Abstracting and indexing ==
This journal is abstracted and indexed in:

- AGRICOLA
- Biological Abstracts
- BIOSIS Previews
- Chemical Abstracts Service
- Current Contents/Life Sciences
- EBSCO databases"Traffic (journal)". MIAR: Information Matrix for the Analysis of Journals. University of Barcelona.
- Embase
- Index Medicus/MEDLINE/PubMed
- ProQuest databases
- Science Citation Index Expanded
- Scopus

According to the Journal Citation Reports, the journal has a 2020 impact factor of 6.215.
