= Karen Oegema =

Molecular cell biologist

- Born: January 1967 (age 59); Holland, Michigan
- Education: University of California San Diego; California Institute of Technology
- Awards: ASCB, Women in Cell Biology Mid-Career Award for Excellence in Research 2017; ASCB, Women in Cell Biology Junior Award for Excellence in Research 2006; Pew Scholar in the Biomedical Sciences 2003
- Scientific career
- Fields: Cell Division and Cell Cycle Control; Genetics and Genomics; Signal Transduction; Stem Cell Biology; Systems Biology
- Workplaces: University of California San Diego; Ludwig Institute for Cancer Research

Karen Oegema (born January 1967) is a molecular cell biologist at the Ludwig Institute for Cancer Research and a professor of cellular and molecular medicine at the University of California, San Diego. She is best known for her research with Caenorhabditis elegans (C. elegans), which her lab uses as a model system in their mission to dissect the molecular mechanics of cytokinesis. She was given the Women in Cell Biology Mid-Career Award for Excellence in Research in 2017, as well as the Women in Cell Biology Junior Award for Excellence in Research in 2006.

== Personal life ==
Oegema was born in Holland, Michigan to father, Theodore R. Oegema Jr, Ph.D. and mother, Carol Oegema, RN. Her family, including brother, Jeff Oegema, moved to Ann Arbor, Michigan shortly after. She spent most of her childhood in Minneapolis, Minnesota after her father took a joint appointment in Orthopedics and Biochemistry at the University of Minnesota Medical School.

She met her husband, Arshad Desai, at UCSF while completing her doctorate. The couple have two children, a boy born in 2003-2004 and a girl born in 2007-2008.

== Education ==
Karen Oegema began pursuing her interest in scientific research as a high school student working in her father's lab at the University of Minnesota Medical School but chose a different path from him, studying chemical engineering at the California Institute of Technology. After receiving her Bachelor of Science in chemistry and learning of her friend's unfulfilling entry-level positions in this field, she shifted her interests back to Cell Biology, receiving her Ph.D. from the University of California, San Francisco in 1996. She then went on to complete a postdoctoral fellowship at the European Molecular Biology Laboratory in Heidelberg, Germany from 1998 to 2001, which became the foundation for the Max Planck Institute (MPI) of Molecular Cell Biology and Genetics in Dresden, Germany.

== Career ==
Oegema took a joint appointment in the Department of Cellular and Molecular Medicine, setting up her own lab in 2003 at the University of California, San Diego Medical School. Her lab studies centriole duplication and the molecular mechanics underlying cytokinesis utilizing C. elegans as a model system. Her lab seeks to make discoveries in three main areas: (1) Build a functional network for the genes required for embryogenesis, (2) Dissect the molecular mechanics of cytokinesis and (3) Understand the mechanisms underlying centriole duplication and centrosome assembly.

Since 2003, Karen Oegema has remained at UCSF and the Ludwig Institute for Cancer Research as the head of the laboratory of mitotic mechanisms, an associate professor and now professor of cellular and molecular medicine. She is also a member of the editorial board for the Journal of Cell Biology, directs the Department of Cellular and Molecular Medicine/Ludwig Cancer Research seminar series and directs the core courses for the Biomedical Sciences graduate program at UCSD. Oegema is also the Vice Chair of the Cancer Research Coordinating Committee at the University of California.

== Significant discoveries ==
During her postdoc in the Hyman Lab at MPI, Oegema helped to pioneer a C. elegans RNAi (RNA mediated interference) screening system that identified 133 genes necessary for cellular processes in early embryos and also indicated that this screen could be applied to the gene functions of other species as well.

Oegema has helped to identify and characterize multiple proteins involved in the regulation of kinetochores and their role in chromosome segregation, known now as CENP-A^{HCP-3}, CENP-C^{HCP-4} and KNL-3.

== Awards and honors ==
- American Society for Cell Biology, Women in Cell Biology Mid-Career Award for Excellence in Research 2017
- American Society for Cell Biology, Women in Cell Biology Junior Award for Excellence in Research 2006
- Pew Scholar in the Biomedical Sciences 2003
