= Amy Gladfelter =

American cell biologist (born 1974)

Amy S. Gladfelter
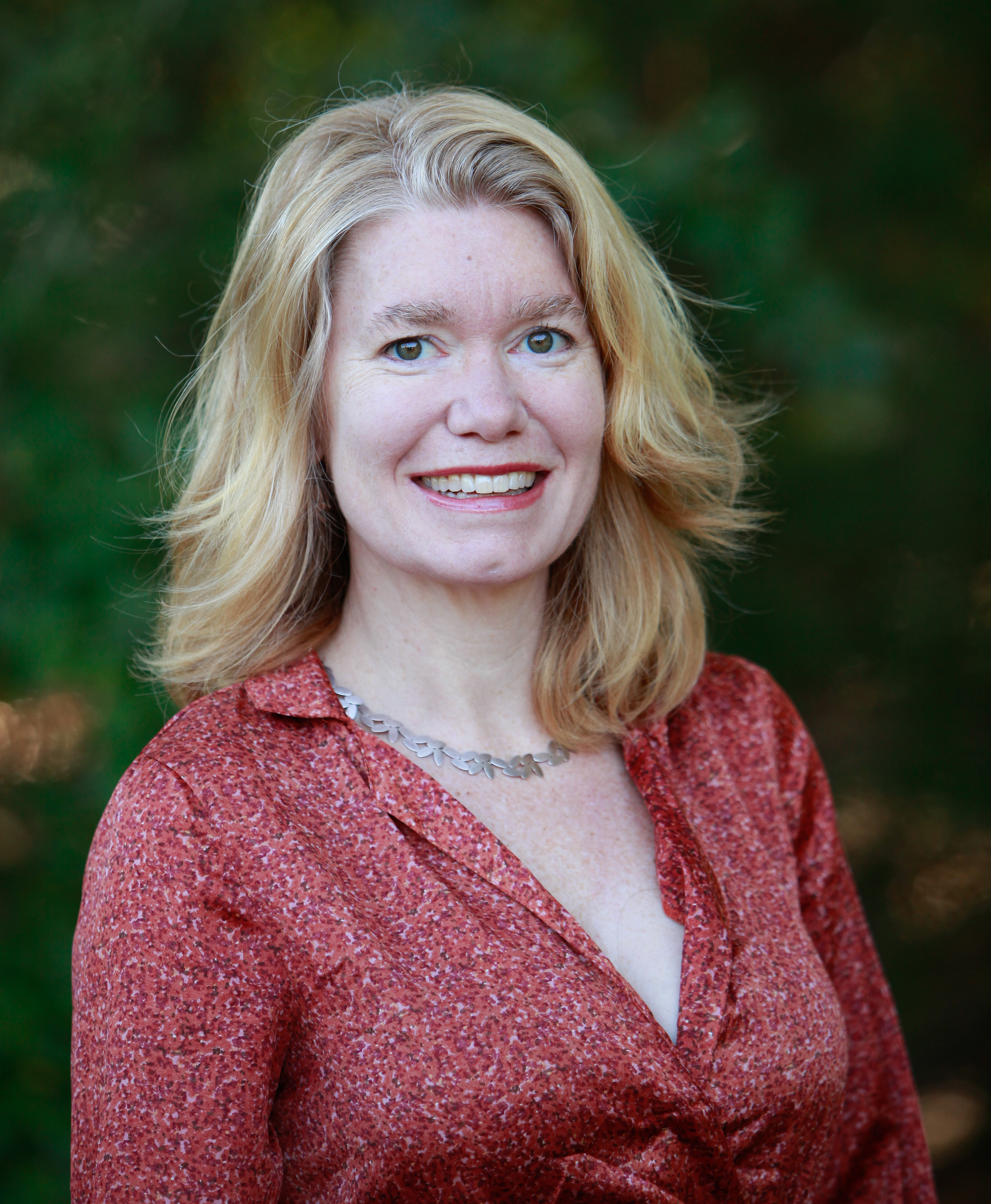
- Born: Philadelphia, Pennsylvania, U.S.
- Education: Princeton University (B.A.); Duke University (PhD)
- Children: 2
- Awards: American Society for Cell Biology, 2015 WICB Mid-Career Award for Excellence in Research Achievement (2015); HHMI Faculty Scholar (2016); Dartmouth Graduate Advising Mentoring Award (2014); Karen E. Wetterhahn Memorial Award for Distinguished Creative and Scholarly Achievement (2012)
- Scientific career
- Fields: Cell biology, Biophysics, Molecular Biology
- Workplaces: Duke University; University of North Carolina at Chapel Hill; Dartmouth College; Biozentrum University of Basel
- Website: gladfelterlab.net

Amy Susanne Gladfelter is a quantitative cell biologist interested in fundamental mechanisms of cell organization. She is currently a Distinguished Duke Health Science and Technology Professor in the Cell Biology and Biomedical Engineering Departments at Duke University. Previously, she was Professor of Biology and Associate chair at the University of North Carolina at Chapel Hill from 2016–2023. She remains a longstanding fellow of the Marine Biological Laboratory in Woods Hole, Massachusetts and is currently the director of the Physiology Course. In her research program, she uses microscopy, biophysical and genetic approaches to study syncytial cells.

== Education ==
She trained at Princeton University (AB) with Bonnie Bassler, Duke University (Ph.D.) with Danny Lew and UniBasel Biozentrum (post-doc) with Peter Philippsen before starting her independent career at Dartmouth in the Biological Sciences department in 2006, where she worked until 2016. She has been honored with the 2014 Graduate Mentoring Award from Dartmouth, the 2015 Mid-Career Award for Excellence in Research from the American Society of Cell Biology, the 2020 Graduate school mentoring award from UNC and was a Howard Hughes Medical Institute Faculty Scholar. She is an elected fellow of the America Academy for Microbiology and the American Academy of Arts and Sciences.

== Cell biology research ==
Gladfelter’s research is focused on the form and function of syncytial cells where many nuclei share a common cytoplasm. She uses biophysical, imaging and modeling approaches in filamentous fungi and placenta to learn the biology of these systems and uncover general principles of cell organization.

Her research program began trying to solve a puzzle of cell cycle regulation which was how nuclei can divide out of sync with one another in a common cytoplasm. This suggested some form of local regulation of the cell cycle. Her group found local control emerges from RNA-based condensates that restrict diffusion of cyclin transcripts and promote nuclear individuality so nuclei can divide independently of neighboring nuclei sharing a cytoplasm. Since that observation, which was one of the early roles described for condensates, she has been using this system and others to understand how RNA sequences and structures can control the molecular composition, identity and function of condensates . These studies extended to the RNA condensates in SARS CoV-2, which also induces syncytial cells, and now the enormous syncytiotrophoblast cells of placenta.

In a second area of work, she had studied how the septin cytoskeleton influences the shape of large syncytial cells. She has implemented new imaging techniques and developed innovative reconstitution assays to study septin filament dynamics on membranes. Her lab discovered septin filaments sense local cell curvature on the micron scale. This function is unique to septins amongst eukaryotic proteins and conserved from yeast to humans. Septins monitor membrane geometry at the base of dendritic spines, the cleavage furrow and cilia, so these studies have broad importance in learning how cell shape controls cell fate.

Here is a link to her Google Scholar page.

== Awards and honors ==
- NSF Post-Doctoral Fellow (2002–2005)
- Roche Research Foundation Fellow (2002–2003)
- Basil O'Connor Scholar, March of Dimes (2008–2010)
- Lemann, Colwin and Spiegel research awards, Marine Biological Lab, Woods Hole, MA (2010, 2011, 2012)
- Karen E. Wetterhahn Memorial Award for Distinguished Creative and Scholarly Achievement (2012)
- Douglas C. Floren Fellow (2012–2013)
- Nikon Fellow, MBL, Woods Hole, MA (2013)
- Dartmouth Graduate Advising Mentoring Award (2014)
- American Society for Cell Biology, 2015 WICB Mid-Career Award for Excellence in Research Achievement (2015)
- HHMI Faculty Scholar (2016)
- American Academy of Arts and Sciences (2023)
- Elected to the National Academy of Sciences (2026)

== Selected works ==
On cytoplasmic organization

- Gladfelter, Amy S.; Hungerbuehler, A. Katrin; Philippsen, Peter (2006). "Asynchronous nuclear division cycles in multinucleated cells". Journal of Cell Biology. 172 (3): 347–362. doi:10.1083/jcb.200507003. PMC 2063645. PMID 16449188.
- Lee, Changhwan; Zhang, Huaiying; Baker, Amy E.; Occhipinti, Patricia; Borsuk, Mark E.; Gladfelter, Amy S. (2013). "Protein Aggregation Behavior Regulates Cyclin Transcript Localization and Cell-Cycle Control". Developmental Cell. 25 (6): 572–584. doi:10.1016/j.devcel.2013.05.007. PMC 4113091. PMID 23769973.
- Zhang, Huaiying; Elbaum-Garfinkle, Shana; Langdon, Erin M.; Taylor, Nicole; Occhipinti, Patricia; Bridges, Andrew A.; Brangwynne, Clifford P.; Gladfelter, Amy S. (2015). "RNA Controls PolyQ Protein Phase Transitions". Molecular Cell. 60 (2): 220–230. doi:10.1016/j.molcel.2015.09.017. PMC 5221516. PMID 26474065.
- Langdon, Erin M.; Qiu, Yupeng; Ghanbari Niaki, Amirhossein; McLaughlin, Grace A.; Weidmann, Chase A.; Gerbich, Therese M.; Smith, Jean A.; Crutchley, John M.; Termini, Christina M.; Weeks, Kevin M.; Myong, Sua; Gladfelter, Amy S. (2018). "MRNA structure determines specificity of a polyQ-driven phase separation". Science. 360 (6391): 922–927. doi:10.1126/science.aar7432. PMC 6192030. PMID 29650703.
- McLaughlin, Grace A.; Langdon, Erin M.; Crutchley, John M.; Holt, Liam J.; Forest, M. Gregory; Newby, Jay M.; Gladfelter, Amy S. (2020). "Spatial heterogeneity of the cytosol revealed by machine learning-based 3D particle tracking". Molecular Biology of the Cell. 31 (14): 1498–1511. doi:10.1091/mbc.E20-03-0210. PMC 7359570. PMID 32401664.
- Iserman, Christiane; Roden, Christine A.; Boerneke, Mark A.; Sealfon, Rachel S.G.; McLaughlin, Grace A.; Jungreis, Irwin; Fritch, Ethan J.; Hou, Yixuan J.; Ekena, Joanne; Weidmann, Chase A.; Theesfeld, Chandra L.; Kellis, Manolis; Troyanskaya, Olga G.; Baric, Ralph S.; Sheahan, Timothy P.; Weeks, Kevin M.; Gladfelter, Amy S. (2020). "Genomic RNA Elements Drive Phase Separation of the SARS-CoV-2 Nucleocapsid". Molecular Cell. 80 (6): 1078–1091.e6. doi:10.1016/j.molcel.2020.11.041. PMC 7691212. PMID 33290746.

On cell shape and septin assembly

- Demay, Bradley S.; Bai, Xiaobo; Howard, Louisa; Occhipinti, Patricia; Meseroll, Rebecca A.; Spiliotis, Elias T.; Oldenbourg, Rudolf; Gladfelter, Amy S. (2011). "Septin filaments exhibit a dynamic, paired organization that is conserved from yeast to mammals". Journal of Cell Biology. 193 (6): 1065–1081. doi:10.1083/jcb.201012143. PMC 3115802. PMID 21670216.
- Bridges, Andrew A.; Jentzsch, Maximilian S.; Oakes, Patrick W.; Occhipinti, Patricia; Gladfelter, Amy S. (2016). "Micron-scale plasma membrane curvature is recognized by the septin cytoskeleton". Journal of Cell Biology. 213 (1): 23–32. doi:10.1083/jcb.201512029. PMC 4828694. PMID 27044896.
- Bridges, Andrew A.; Zhang, Huaiying; Mehta, Shalin B.; Occhipinti, Patricia; Tani, Tomomi; Gladfelter, Amy S. (2014). "Septin assemblies form by diffusion-driven annealing on membranes". Proceedings of the National Academy of Sciences. 111 (6): 2146–2151. doi:10.1073/pnas.1314138111. PMC 3926015. PMID 24469790.
- Cannon, Kevin S.; Woods, Benjamin L.; Crutchley, John M.; Gladfelter, Amy S. (2019). "An amphipathic helix enables septins to sense micrometer-scale membrane curvature". Journal of Cell Biology. 218 (4): 1128–1137. doi:10.1083/jcb.201807211. PMC 6446858. PMID 30659102.
- Mitchison-Field, Lorna M.Y.; Vargas-Muñiz, José M.; Stormo, Benjamin M.; Vogt, Ellysa J.D.; Van Dierdonck, Sarah; Pelletier, James F.; Ehrlich, Christoph; Lew, Daniel J.; Field, Christine M.; Gladfelter, Amy S. (2019). "Unconventional Cell Division Cycles from Marine-Derived Yeasts". Current Biology. 29 (20): 3439–3456.e5. doi:10.1016/j.cub.2019.08.050. PMC 7076734. PMID 31607535.
- Jiao, Fang; Cannon, Kevin S.; Lin, Yi-Chih; Gladfelter, Amy S.; Scheuring, Simon (2020). "The hierarchical assembly of septins revealed by high-speed AFM". Nature Communications. 11 (1): 5062. doi:10.1038/s41467-020-18778-x. PMC 7545167. PMID 33033254.
