= Samara Reck-Peterson =

American cell biologist and biophysicist

- Born: 1971 (age 54–55); Seattle, Washington
- Known for: Studies of the motor protein dynein
- Scientific career
- Workplaces: Harvard Medical School; University of California, San Diego; Howard Hughes Medical Institute; Weill Cornell Medicine
- Thesis: Functional, Biochemical and Biophysical Characterization of Myo2p, a Class V Myosin of the Yeast Saccharomyces cerevisiae
- Doctoral advisor: Mark Mooseker and Peter Novick
- Other academic advisors: Ronald Vale

Samara Reck-Peterson is an American cell biologist and biophysicist. She is Professor and Chair of the Department of Biochemistry and Biophysics at Weill Cornell Medicine, and Investigator of the Howard Hughes Medical Institute. She is known for her contributions to our understanding of how dynein, an exceptionally large motor protein that moves many intracellular cargos, works and is regulated. She developed one of the first systems to produce recombinant dynein and discovered that, unlike other cytoskeletal motors, dynein can take a wide variety of step sizes, forward and back and even sideways.

== Early life and education ==
Reck-Peterson was educated at Litchfield High School in Litchfield, Minnesota, where she served as senior class president and graduated as salutatorian in 1989. She was an all-state track and cross-country runner and team captain. She was inducted into the Litchfield High School Hall of Fame in 2017.

== Career ==
Reck-Peterson became interested in molecular motors when she took the Physiology Course at the Marine Biological Laboratory at Woods Hole, Massachusetts. She chose the motor protein myosin as the topic of her Ph.D. work in the laboratories of Mark Mooseker and Peter Novick at Yale University. Her work focused on the class V myosins, which have multiple functions in the cell ranging from mRNA transport to cell polarity and membrane trafficking. She developed a modified in vitro motility assay to show that both Myo2p and Myo4p class V myosins in yeast appear to be non-processive motors in the absence of additional regulation, unlike their vertebrate counterparts.

In 2001, Reck-Peterson moved to UCSF to pursue post-doctoral studies with Ronald Vale. She began to work on dynein, a molecular motor that transports cargoes such as proteins, organelles and messenger RNAs to locations where they are needed in the cell. Dynein uses the energy stored in ATP to move towards the "minus end" of microtubules. Defects in dyneins and their regulatory proteins lead to neurodevelopmental and neurodegenerative diseases, showing the importance of microtubule-based transport in long cells such as neurons. Reck-Peterson used single-molecule techniques to examine the stepping behavior of dynein, finding that isolated dynein can step forwards, backwards and even sideways.

In 2007, Reck-Peterson joined the Department of Cell Biology at Harvard Medical School as an assistant professor. She continued to study the mechanism of dynein-mediated transport. Using DNA origami, she created artificial cargos that could be programmed to load onto multiple types of motors, and used these to create competition, or a "tug of war", between motors. She used an assay for long-distance microtubule-based transport in the long, highly polarized hyphae of Aspergillus nidulans to show that Lis-1 is an initiation factor for dynein-mediated transport, and to show that some cargos of microtubule-based motors hitchhike on others. Mutants in the gene encoding Lis-1 are one cause of lissencephaly, a severe brain disorder. In collaboration with Andres Leschziner, she showed that Lis-1 regulates the interaction between dynein and the microtubule in two different ways, and determined the structural basis for the switch between microtubule binding and microtubule release.

In 2015 Reck-Peterson moved to the University of California, San Diego, and in 2018 she became an Investigator of the Howard Hughes Medical Institute.

In 2025 Reck-Peterson was recruited as chair for the newly formed department of Biochemistry and Biophysics at Weill Cornell Medicine in New York City.

== Awards ==
- HHMI-Simons Faculty Scholar
- Bjorkman-Strominger-Wiley Prize for Collaboration
- American Society for Cell Biology WICB Junior Award for Excellence in Research
- Young Mentor Award, Harvard Medical School
- Armenise-Harvard Foundation Junior Faculty Grant
- Rita Allen Milton Cassel Scholar
- NIH Director's New Innovator Award
