= Mary Clutter =

Plant biologist (1930–2019)

- Born: March 29, 1930; Charleroi, Pennsylvania, US
- Died: December 9, 2019 (aged 89)
- Occupation: Plant biologist
- Years active: 1960–2005
- Known for: Work on plant genetics and hormone interactions; Outreach for women in science; National Science Foundation grant work
- Notable work: Dormancy and Developmental Arrest (1978)

Mary E. Clutter (March 29, 1930 – December 9, 2019) was an American plant biologist who studied the interactions between plant hormones and gene activation in order to understand how to manipulate and alter gene expression. A Pennsylvanian, she obtained a Ph.D from the University of Pittsburgh while studying plant tissues and went on to produce groundbreaking genetics research at Yale University.

In addition to her research, she spent much time improving outreach for women in science and addressing sex discrimination in regards to promotions and advancement. She joined the National Science Foundation in 1974 and later became assistant director for all of the biological sciences, helping use the Foundation's grants to support scientists based on merit, especially the accomplishments of overlooked women. Her following appointments and activities would see her help organize multiple scientific projects around plant biology, including the genome of model organism Arabidopsis thaliana.

She served in several professional scientific societies, including the American Association for the Advancement of Science, the American Society for Cell Biology, and the Association for Women in Science, along with a number of boards for governmental science committees, particularly those involving biotechnology. Multiple awards and honorary doctorates were given to her, including three Presidential Rank Awards during three separate presidential administrations.

== Childhood and education ==
Born in Charleroi, Pennsylvania on March 29, 1930, to Frank and Helen Clutter, Clutter attended Allegheny College, where she earned a Bachelor's of Science in biology and went on to work in the lab of Ralph Wetmore at Harvard University. When one of the lab members, Ian Sussex, left the lab to become an assistant professor at the University of Pittsburgh, Clutter took the opportunity to join him to start graduate studies in his lab, obtaining a Master of Science degree and a Ph.D. while studying the process of plant tissue culturing.

== Career ==
=== Early research and women in science ===
In 1960, Sussex moved his lab to Yale University and Clutter decided to join him as a research associate. The work she conducted with graduate students formed into its own independent research program, despite technically still being under the purview of the Sussex lab. But due to the hostility toward women in high level academic positions at the time, Clutter knew it was not likely that a permanent professorship position would be offered to her at Yale. She noticed this lack of advancement for other women and how little the all-male graduate class at the university cared about the issue, so she made two decisions.

First, she formed a class with Virginia Walbot on how science and society interact, having the students collect local river water nearby to factories and other industries, in order to see how such sites had negative impacts on the people living in New Haven, Connecticut. She secondly decided to create a women's society with Walbot, Mary Lake Polan, and other women scientists that would bolster the entire movement of encouraging and supporting women in science. During the 1971 meeting of the AAAS, she and Walbot organized a women's caucus within the organization and had a $50,000 funding extension authorized for the creation of a Women In Science Office, which they announced in Science the following year.

=== NSF appointment and scientific outreach ===
Subsequently in 1974, Clutter was appointed as a rotational member for the Developmental Biology Program at the National Science Foundation. She used the position to appoint women scientists to review boards at the NSF and as other rotational members. She made sure to appoint the positions on merit and only chose women who were highly accomplished in science, but had not thus far been given the positions they deserved from those achievements. She also helped create the Competitive Research Grants Office at the USDA in 1977, helping staff the office with individuals specialized in grant work from the NSF. Clutter went on to a permanent NSF position and to program director, then cellular bioscience division director, before becoming science advisor for the NSF director, Erich Bloch at the time. She was in 1989 made assistant director for all biological sciences at the organization, which she remained until she retired in 2005. Upon being given control over grant funding as assistant director, she made a rule for scientific conference funding that the speakers chosen to present research had to include some women or the conference would not receive NSF funding.

Clutter strongly supported higher level studies in plant biology, working on the NSF Postdoctoral Research Fellowships in Plant Biology with her position and, in 1983, establishing a Plant Molecular Biology course at the Cold Spring Harbor Laboratory. Creating the bioinformatics program under the NSF's biology division in 1991, she envisioned the importance of biological data at that early point. She also pushed for more international collaboration in science and breaking the barriers between different areas of science. This led her to help found organizations including the Human Frontier Science Program and the Global Biodiversity Information Facility. To ensure funding for these research endeavors, she helped create the McKnight Foundation Collaborative Crop Research Program in 1983. She spoke, in 1993, on her belief that openings for women positions in science would expand throughout the decade, encouraging many to not only do science, but actively present their work in conferences and join review boards and professional women's organizations.

During research for the Human Genome Project, the scientists involved chose not to include Arabidopsis thaliana as one of their model organisms for testing. Because of that, Clutter organized funding from multiple international sources to form in 1990 the Multinational Coordinated Arabidopsis thaliana Genome Research Project, which would complete its work with a full sequencing of the plant's genome by 2000. She was also asked, when Congress was debating funding, on whether she and the NSF would accept funding for a Plant Genome Research Program (PGRP), which she did on the guarantee that the funding was new money and not taken from other NSF initiatives and that the NSF had full control over how the program was conducted. Started in 1998, she made sure that the PGRP did not supersede other existing biology initiatives at the NSF and was instead used for entirely new areas of plant research, also establishing the program's guiding principles which includes collaboration between nations and within the private industry area of research, full peer review of all research produced when deciding on funding, and the quick publication of all data made so other groups could benefit from it.

Upon her retirement from the NSF in 2005, she went on to be a founder, along with Florence Pat Haseltine, of the Cosmos Group, a networking dinner group of women in federal employment. The dinners are held monthly at the Cosmos Club. She was also on the board of directors for the Boyce Thompson Institute. She additionally made sure to continue her attendance as a member of the AAAS and at the annual Plant and Animal Genome Conference.

== Research ==
The focus of Clutter's lifelong research involved plant tissues, cells, and the methods of development of cells into differentiated forms. The techniques she developed for inducing cellular changes would later be termed reprogramming. She published a paper in the August 1960 issue of Science that covered the differentiation of vascular tissue in tobacco through the use of hormone induction that would be a highly discussed publication showcasing how cells can be forcibly altered. The following year, she released an announcement on a successful experiment using plant hormones to convert the food storage cells into ones that conducted water instead.

After joining Sussex's lab, she began working on how auxins affect cell differentiation and how said hormones are moved throughout the plant tissues. Advances in the field on the existence of polytene chromosomes in plants inspired Clutter to try and detect specific gene sequences for the first time in living plants, which she worked on with her "first unofficial graduate student" Tom Brady, and published a paper on the subject in 1972.

== Organizations and boards ==
Clutter joined the American Society for Cell Biology during her early research years, before forming the Women in Cell Biology subcommittee in 1971. Working to gather members for the subsequent meeting of the group, she successfully had close to a thousand women join the organization. She became a member of the Association for Women in Science in 1994 and became a full fellow of the group in 1996. She prior had been made a fellow for the AAAS and later served on its board of directors.

During her later career, she served as the U.S. chair representative for the U.S. European Commission Task Force on Biotechnology. She was also a part of the Board of Regents for the National Library of Medicine and a part of the National Agricultural Research, Extension, Education and Economics Advisory Board. She was additionally given the chair seat for the Biotechnology Subcommittee of the Committee on Science of the National Science and Technology Council (NSTC). Lastly, she served as co-chair on the Subcommittee on Ecological Systems of the Committee on Environment and Natural Resources/NSK.

== Awards and honors ==
Clutter received several awards in her lifetime, including the Leadership in Science Public Service Award from the American Society of Plant Biologists and three Presidential Rank Awards from three separate Presidents. She was also given honorary doctorates from Allegheny College and Mount Holyoke College. The University of Pittsburgh gave her in 1988 the Bicentennial Medallion of Distinction.

== Personal life ==
Clutter had three siblings, two brothers and a sister.

== Bibliography ==
- —, ed. (1978). Dormancy and Developmental Arrest: Experimental Analysis in Plants and Animals. Elsevier Science. p. 328. ISBN 9781483276427.
