= Scott E. Fraser =

American biophysicist

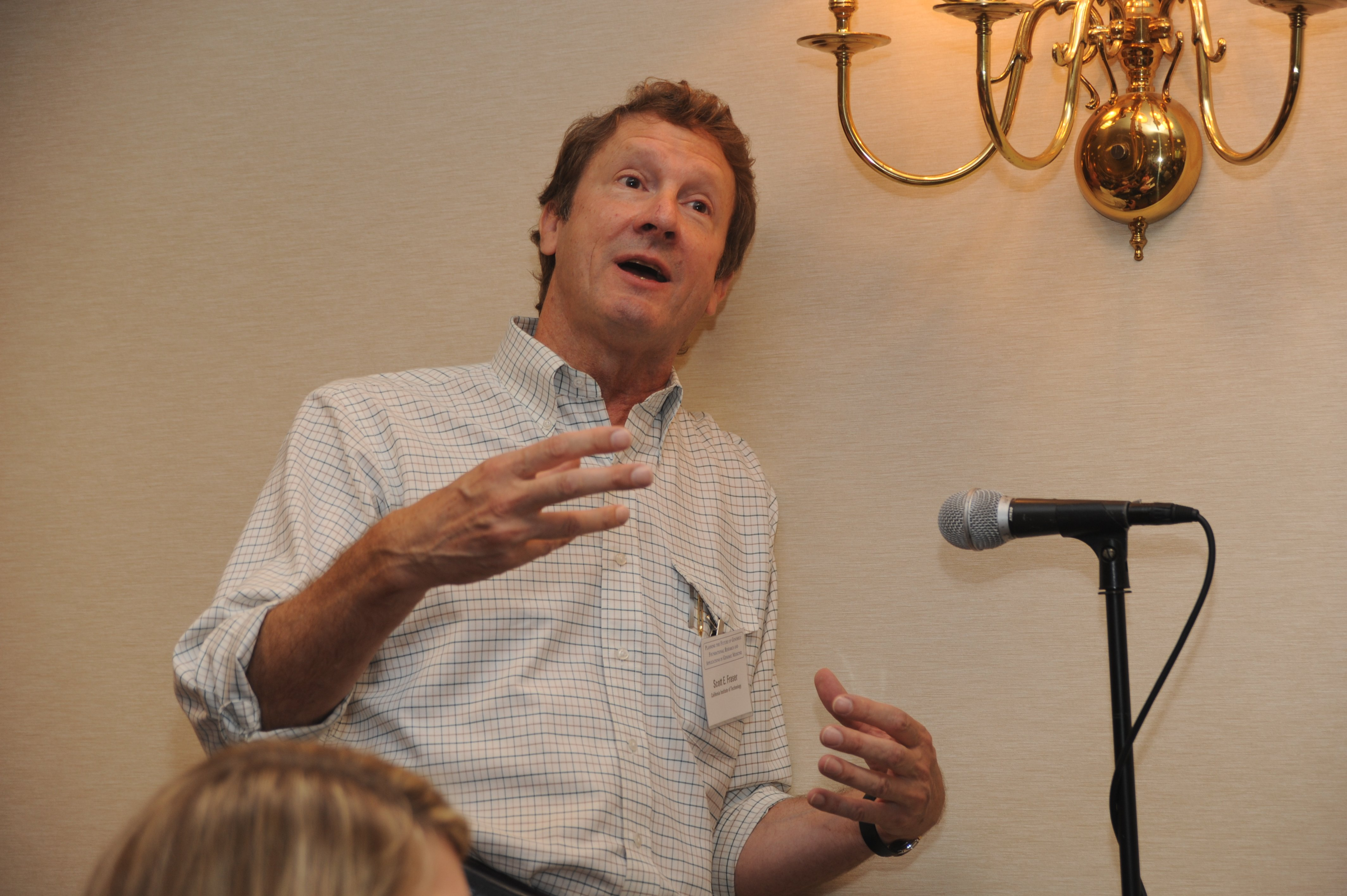
- Fraser in 2010

Academic background
- Education: Harvey Mudd College; Johns Hopkins University
- Thesis: Neuroplasticity in the Xenopus visual system (1979)
- Doctoral advisor: Richard Kevin Hunt

Scott E. Fraser is an American biophysicist and Provost Professor of Biological Sciences and Biomedical Engineering at the University of Southern California (USC). He is also the Elizabeth Garrett Chair in Convergent Bioscience and Director of Science Initiatives, where he is helping to launch USC’s Initiative in Convergent Bioscience. In addition, he holds joint appointments in the Departments of Physiology and Biophysics, Stem Cell Biology and Regenerative Medicine, Pediatrics, Radiology, and Ophthalmology.

Fraser and his colleagues are known for their development of light and magnetic resonance imaging (MRI) microscopy techniques for imaging the dynamics of embryonic development. More recently his research team has taken these imaging techniques into disease models and clinical medicine, in areas ranging from eye disease to cancer.

== Education and career ==
Fraser began his scientific career studying Physics (B.S. with honors, Harvey Mudd College, 1976) and Biophysics (Ph.D. with distinction, Johns Hopkins University, 1979) before joining the faculty at the University of California, Irvine in 1980, where he eventually become Chairman of the Department of Physiology and Biophysics. In 1990, Fraser moved to the California Institute of Technology (Caltech) to serve as the Anna L. Rosen Professor of Biology, Professor of Engineering and Applied Science, and the Director of the Biological Imaging Center at the Beckman Institute. He was also the Founding Director of the Caltech Brain Imaging Center from 2002 to 2008, a founding member of the Kavli Nanoscience Institute, and served as the Director of the Rosen Center for Biological Engineering from 2008 to 2012.

In the fall of 2012, Fraser moved to USC to take a Provost Professorship in the USC Dornsife College of Letters, Arts and Sciences, the Children's Hospital Los Angeles, Keck School of Medicine, and the Viterbi School of Engineering.

Fraser has published more than 200 peer-reviewed scientific papers. He has received 63 U.S. patents for inventions in biological imaging, chemistry, and nanotechnology. He is a Fellow of the American Association for the Advancement of Science, the European Academy of Sciences, the American Academy of Arts and Sciences, and the American Institute for Medical and Biological Engineering. He was recently nominated to the National Academy of Inventors, the highest professional distinction accorded to academic inventors. Throughout his career, he has served as an advisor to several different corporations, organizations, and foundations, and has launched several startup companies, such as Clinical Micro Sensors and Varocto Inc. In 2021, Fraser was awarded the Society for Developmental Biology Edwin G. Conklin Medal, which recognises extraordinary research contributions and mentorship in the field.

In April 2025 Fraser became the president of the Chan Zuckerberg (CZ) Imaging Institute. which then merged with CZ Biohub San Francisco into the Biohub Imaging Institute in Redwood City, California. Prior to this appointment, he was the Chan Zuckerberg Initiative's vice president of science grant programs.
