= Prachee Avasthi =

Researcher

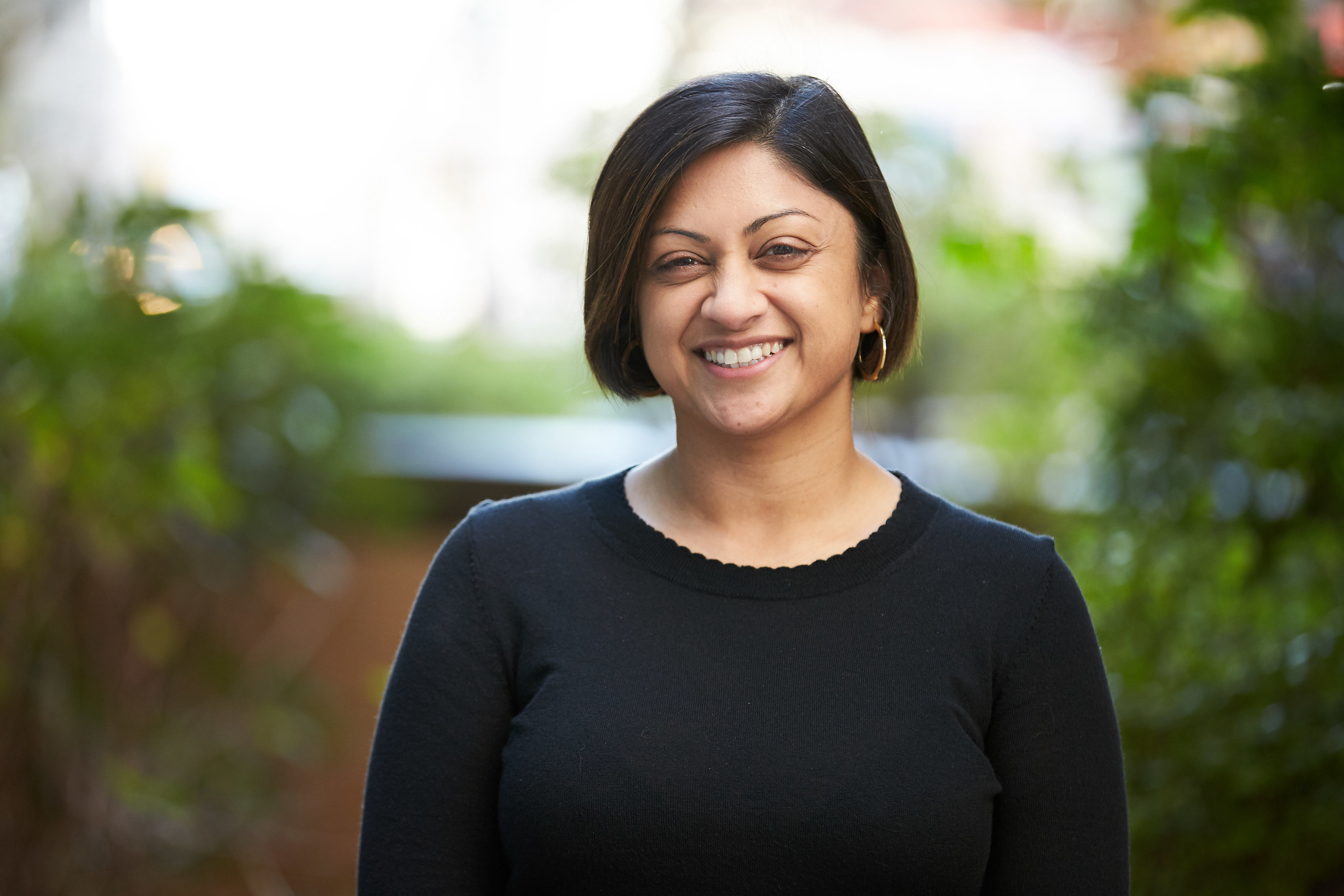
- Prachee Avasthi
- Education: University of Illinois at Urbana–Champaign; University of Utah
- Scientific career
- Workplaces: Arcadia Science; Astera Institute; Geisel School of Medicine at Dartmouth; University of California, San Francisco; University of Kansas Medical Center

Prachee Avasthi (born 1979) is a co-founder and Chief Scientific Officer at Arcadia Science and the Head of Open Science at Astera Institute. She was previously a Professor of Anatomy and Cell Biology at Dartmouth College. She works on upwardly motile Chlamydomonas reinhardtii and was previously on the Board of Directors of eLife.

== Early life and education ==
Avasthi studied integrative physiology at the University of Illinois at Urbana–Champaign. During her undergraduate program she worked on insect classification and synaptic plasticity. She became more interested in the brain, and earned her PhD in neuroscience under the supervision of Wolfgang Baehr at the University of Utah. During her doctoral studies she investigated how cilia help our eye's photoreceptors detect light. She was a postdoctoral researcher with Wallace Marshall at the University of California, San Francisco. Here she began work on Chlamydomonas reinhardtii, a model organism for studying cilia. Cilia function requires normal cilia length and motility, and Avasthi identified that the dopamine binding G protein-coupled receptors (GPCRs) were the most regularly involved with flagellar length regulation.

== Research and career ==
Avasthi uses Chlamydomonas reinhardtii, a unicellular green alga, to investigate the assembly of cilia. She was particularly interested in the cellular machinery needed to maintain cilia, and used small molecule chemical inhibitors to identify important features in ciliary transport. Avasthi found that actin, a cytoskeleton protein, was required for intraflagellar transport (IFT) regulation in Chlamydomonas reinhardtii. The actin is recruits IFT to basal bodies during the elongation of flagella; and without actin the flagellar length is lost. She saw the same impacts using a myosin inhibitor, which suggests that actin may use a myosin pathway.

In 2015 Avasthi started her own research group at the University of Kansas Medical Center, which is supported by the National Institutes of Health. She combines chemical biology and biochemistry with genetics to understand the mechanisms that regulate assembly of the cilium. In 2018 she was awarded an NIH R35 Outstanding Investigator Award.

=== Academic service ===
Avasthi is enthusiastic about reforming scientific research culture, helping early career researchers set up their own laboratories. She launched New PI Slack, an online space for over a thousand new Principal investigators to share notes and ideas. Avasthi supports preprints and the reform of scientific publishing, and is on the Board of Directors of eLife and ASAPbio. In her laboratory she leads a preprint journal club, where members of her group read and review new material, providing feedback to authors.
