= Women in Cell Biology =

Subcommittee of the American Society for Cell Biology

Women in Cell Biology (WCIB) is a subcommittee of the American Society for Cell Biology (ASCB) created to promote women in cell biology and present awards.

== History ==
A group of women were unhappy with the lack of recognition in ASCB. In 1971, Virginia Walbot gathered a group of women to meet at the annual ASCB meetings and WICB began. The goal was to provide a space for women to talk and network with other women in the field, learn about job opportunities, and promote women in academia. Newsletters were distributed containing job listings and news of powerful women in biology. Originally, WICB was not accepted by ASCB; the newsletter was not funded and later discontinued in the 1970s. WICB was established as a standing committee within ASCB in 1993.

The formation of the committee correlates with increased women representation at the annual meeting. Between 1967-1977, there was only one woman speaker at the annual meeting; between 1990-1999, 21% of speakers were women. These numbers increased to parity with men by 2020 with equal numbers as speakers and as award recipients.

== Activities ==
Currently, WICB meets annually at ASCB meetings and has a column in the ASCB newsletter. The goals of WICB are to nominate and give awards and communicate through the newsletter.

The WICB columns provided advice for women particularly in research and job seeking. WICB wrote a guide for job hunt strategies and the columns from the ASCB newsletter were compiled into guides available as downloadable pdfs from ASCB. The WICB provides matchmaking services to assist job seekers with help with interviews, CVs, and cover letter.

WICB initiated the Mid-Career Award in 2013 to target mid-career scientists which for women, often reflects a time of tenure considerations as well as increased family responsibilities. Future goals of the committee include expanding inclusivity across all genders and support for underrepresented groups.

== Awards ==
WICB awards the following annually:

- WICB Junior Award for Excellence in Research
- WICB Mid-Career Award for Excellence in Research
- Sandra K. Masur Senior Leadership Award
- link to profiles of women on the 50th anniversary: https://www.youtube.com/watch?v=gXy43div2Sk
