= Sandra Schmid =

Canadian biologist

Sandra Louise Schmid
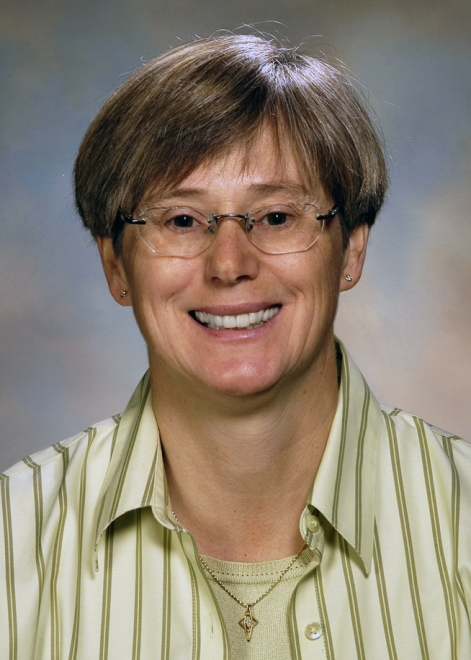
- Born: March 7, 1958; Vancouver, British Columbia
- Education: University of British Columbia, Stanford University
- Scientific career
- Fields: Cell Biology
- Workplaces: University of Texas Southwestern Medical Center, CZ Biohub
- Doctoral advisor: James E. Rothman
- Other academic advisors: Ira Mellman

Sandra Louise Schmid (born March 7, 1958, in Vancouver, British Columbia) is the first Chief Scientific Officer of the Chan Zuckerberg Biohub. She is a Canadian cell biologist by training; prior to her move to CZ Biohub, she was Professor and Chair of the Cell Biology Department at the University of Texas Southwestern Medical Center. Throughout her academic career, she has authored over 105 publications on the molecular mechanism and regulation of clathrin-mediated endocytosis and the structure and function of the GTPase dynamin and mechanisms governing membrane fission. She was the first to identify dynamin's key role in endocytosis. She is a co-founder of the journal Traffic and has been the Editor-in-Chief of Molecular Biology of the Cell, and the President of the American Society for Cell Biology.

== Early life and education ==
Schmid was born March 7, 1958, in Vancouver, British Columbia, Canada. She credits her father, a high school science teacher, and her unique schooling experience for her interest in science. In her early education, Schmid was enrolled in a gifted student program in which teachers rejected textbooks and students were challenged to think critically.

Schmid graduated high school as the valedictorian of her class. She received a Bachelor of Science degree in cell biology from the University of British Columbia in 1980 and received an undergraduate medical research grant while there. She earned a Ph.D. in biochemistry from Stanford University in 1985 under the mentorship of James E. Rothman. In 2009, Schmid earned a Master of Science in Executive Leadership from the University of San Diego School of Business.

== Past research positions ==
After earning her Ph.D at Stanford, Schmid worked as a postdoctoral fellow in the Department of Cell Biology at Yale University from 1985 to 1988, working in the lab of Ira Mellman. There, she helped develop techniques for isolating endosomes, which Mellman and colleagues had recently discovered and named. From 1988 to 1994, she was an assistant member of the Department of Cell Biology at Scripps Research, previously known as The Scripps Research Institute and in 1994 she was promoted to associate member. In 1996, Schmid became an associate professor with tenure at Scripps Research, and in 2000 she earned the title of professor. In 2000 she became the Chairman of the Department of Cell Biology at Scripps Research and in 2012 she was named the chairman of the Department of Cell Biology at the University of Texas Southwestern Medical Center.

== Additional scientific roles ==
In April 2020, Sandra Schmid was named as the first Chief Scientific Officer (CSO) at the Chan Zuckerberg Biohub.

== Awards and honors ==
In 1976, Schmid was awarded the British Columbia Provincial Scholarship and the Vancouver Student Civic Citizenship Award. She was the Helen Hay Whitney Post-doctoral Fellow at Yale University from 1985 to 1987. In 1990, she received a Junior Career Recognition Award from the American Society of Cell Biology, and in 1994 she received the American Heart Established Investigator Award. From 2000 until 2010 she received an NIH MERIT Award. In 2002, she earned the University of California San Diego Athena Pinnacle Award in Biotechnology. In 2006 she was the Elected Fellow of the American Association for the Advancement of Science. In 2009 she received the American Society for Biochemistry and Molecular Biology William C. Rose Award, and she was also elected as the President of the American Society of Cell Biology. In 2020, Schmid was elected to the National Academy of Sciences (NAS) for her distinguished and continuing achievements in original research.. In 2025 she received the American Society for Cell Biology E.B. Wilson Award, in recognition of her 'far-reaching contributions to cell biology over a lifetime in science.

Schmid married Bill Balch in 1984. In 1986, they both took jobs in the cell biology department at Scripps Research. She has two children and credits her supportive husband for her ability to balance work and family.
