= List of members of the National Academy of Sciences (microbial biology) =

This list is a subsection of the List of members of the National Academy of Sciences, which includes more than 7,000 members and international members of the United States National Academy of Sciences, both living and deceased, each affiliated with one of 31 disciplinary sections. Members are listed under their primary section, and each person's name, primary institution, and election year are given. For deceased members, the year of death is noted.

Name	Institution	Date
Edward Adelberg (died 2009)	Yale University	1971
Sankar Adhya	NIH	1994
Porter W. Anderson Jr.	Harvard Medical School	2010
Raul Andino Pavlovsky	University of California, San Francisco	2025
Charles Armstrong (died 1967)	National Institutes of Health	1944
Robert Austrian (died 2007)	Perelman School of Medicine at the University of Pennsylvania	1979
David Baltimore (died 2025)	California Institute of Technology	1974
Ralph S. Baric	The University of North Carolina at Chapel Hill	2021
Carolina Barillas-Mury	NIH	2014
Bonnie L. Bassler	Princeton University	2006
Andreas J. Bäumler	University of California, Davis	2023
Jonathan Beckwith	Harvard Medical School	1984
Yasmine Belkaid	Institut Pasteur	2017
Kenneth Berns (died 2024)	University of Florida	1995
Paul D. Bieniasz	Rockefeller University	2024
John C. Boothroyd	Stanford University	2016
Paul R. Cannon (died 1986)	The University of Chicago	1946
Carol A. Carter	Stony Brook University	2024
Arturo Casadevall	Johns Hopkins Bloomberg School of Public Health	2022
Yuan Chang	University of Pittsburgh	2012
Robert M. Chanock (died 2010)	National Institutes of Health	1973
Emmanuelle M. Charpentier	Max Planck Institute for Infection Biology	2017
Ding-Shinn Chen (died 2020)	National Taiwan University	2005
Francis V. Chisari	Scripps Research	2002
Purnell W. Choppin (died 2021)	Howard Hughes Medical Institute	1977
John M. Coffin	Tufts University	1999
Zanvil A. Cohn (died 1993)	Rockefeller University	1975
R. John Collier	Harvard University	1991
Pascale Cossart	Institut Pasteur	2009
John E. Cronan	University of Illinois at Urbana-Champaign	2017
K. Heran Darwin	New York University Grossman School of Medicine	2024
Julian Davies	University of British Columbia	2014
Michael S. Diamond	Washington University School of Medicine	2024
Esteban Domingo	Consejo Superior de Investigaciones Cientificas (CSIC)	2020
René J. Dubos (died 1982)	Rockefeller University	1941
Paul T. Englund (died 2019)	Johns Hopkins University	2012
Mary K. Estes	Baylor College of Medicine	2007
Stanley Falkow (died 2018)	Stanford University	1984
Frank J. Fenner (died 2010)	Australian National University	1977
Bernard N. Fields (died 1995)	Harvard Medical School	1985
Maxwell Finland (died 1987)	Boston University	1971
Simon Flexner (died 1946)	Rockefeller Institute for Medical Research	1908
Edward C. Franklin (died 1937)	Stanford University	1914
Alberto C. Frasch (died 2023)	National University of San Martin	2006
Claire M. Fraser	University of Maryland School of Medicine	2023
D. Carleton Gajdusek (died 2008)	Centre National de la Recherche Scientifique	1974
Jorge E. Galán	Yale School of Medicine	2012
Robert C. Gallo	University of Maryland Baltimore	1988
Don Ganem	University of California, San Francisco	2010
Adolfo García-Sastre	Icahn School of Medicine at Mount Sinai	2019
Harold S. Ginsberg (died 2003)	National Institutes of Health	1982
Walther F. Goebel (died 1993)	Rockefeller University	1958
Stephen P. Goff	Columbia University	2006
Harry Goldblatt (died 1977)	Mount Sinai Hospital (Cleveland)	1973
Emil C. Gotschlich (died 2023)	Rockefeller University	1987
Barney S. Graham	Morehouse School of Medicine	2022
E. Peter Greenberg	University of Washington	2004
Diane Griffin (died 2024)	Johns Hopkins University	2004
Beatrice H. Hahn	University of Pennsylvania	2012
J. Woodland Hastings (died 2014)	Harvard University	2003
Graham F. Hatfull	University of Pittsburgh	2024
Joseph Heitman	Duke University School of Medicine	2021
Werner Henle (died 1987)	Children's Hospital of Philadelphia	1975
Maurice R. Hilleman (died 2005)	Merck & Co.	1985
James G. Hirsch (died 1987)	Josiah Macy Jr. Foundation	1972
George K. Hirst (died 1994)	Public Health Research Institute	1966
Dorothy M. Horstmann (died 2001)	Yale School of Medicine	1975
Peter M. Howley	Harvard University	1993
Robert J. Huebner (died 1998)	National Institutes of Health	1960
Scott J. Hultgren	Washington University School of Medicine	2011
Ralph R. Isberg	Tufts University School of Medicine	2009
William R. Jacobs, Jr.	Albert Einstein College of Medicine	2013
Christine Jacobs-Wagner	Yale University	2015
Wolfgang K. Joklik (died 2019)	Duke University	1981
Katalin Karikó	University of Szeged	2025
Dennis L. Kasper	Harvard University	2018
Elliott D. Kieff (died 2024)	Harvard University	1996
Edwin D. Kilbourne (died 2011)	New York Medical College	1977
Karla Kirkegaard	Stanford University	2019
David M. Knipe	Harvard Medical School	2021
Eugene V. Koonin	NIH	2016
Hans Kornberg (died 2019)	Boston University	1986
Richard Krause (died 2015)	National Institutes of Health	1977
Saul Krugman (died 1995)	New York University	1976
Kyung J. Kwon-Chung	National Institutes of Health	2024
Robert A. Lamb (died 2023)	Northwestern University	2003
Ho-Wang Lee (died 2022)	National Academy of Sciences, Republic of Korea	2002
Stanley M. Lemon	University of North Carolina at Chapel Hill	2024
Joe Lutkenhaus	University of Kansas	2014
Luciano A. Marraffini	The Rockefeller University	2019
Barry J. Marshall	University of Western Australia	2008
Malcolm A. Martin	National Institutes of Health	1998
Maclyn McCarty (died 2005)	Rockefeller University	1963
Margaret McFall-Ngai	Carnegie Institution for Science	2014
John J. Mekalanos	Harvard University	1998
C. Phillip Miller (died 1985)	University of Chicago	1956
Jeffery F. Miller	UCLA	2015
Louis H. Miller	National Institutes of Health	1990
Penny L. Moore	University of the Witwatersrand	2025
Bernard Moss	National Institutes of Health	1987
Hiroshi Nikaido	University of California, Berkeley	2009
Staffan Normark	Karolinska Institutet	2019
Richard P. Novick	New York University	2006
Ruth S. Nussenzweig (died 2018)	New York University	2013
Michael B. Oldstone (died 2023)	Scripps Research Institute	2008
Kim Orth	UT Southwestern Medical Center	2020
M. J. Osborn (died 2019)	University of Connecticut Health Center	1978
Julie Overbaugh	Fred Hutchinson Cancer Center	2021
Norman R. Pace	University of Colorado at Boulder	1991
Peter Palese	Mount Sinai School of Medicine	2000
Joseph Sriyal Malik Peiris	The University of Hong Kong	2017
Stanley Perlman	The University of Iowa	2025
Daniel A. Portnoy	University of California, Berkeley	2013
Robert H. Purcell	National Institutes of Health	1988
Lalita Ramakrishnan	University of Cambridge	2015
Charles Rammelkamp (died 1981)	Case Western Reserve University	1973
Linda L. Randall	University of Missouri	1997
Rino Rappuoli	Fondazione Biotecnopolo di Siena	2005
Charles M. Rice III	Rockefeller University	2005
Frederick C. Robbins (died 2003)	Case Western Reserve University	1972
John B. Robbins (died 2019)	National Institutes of Health	1996
Richard J. Roberts	New England BioLabs, Inc.	2023
Bernard Roizman	University of Chicago	1979
Wallace P. Rowe (died 1983)	National Institute of Allergy and Infectious Diseases	1975
Albert B. Sabin (died 1993)	University of Cincinnati	1951
Philippe Sansonetti	Institut Pasteur	2012
Peter Sarnow	Stanford University	2020
John T. Schiller	NIH	2020
Olaf Schneewind (died 2019)	University of Chicago	2018
Thomas E. Shenk	Princeton University	1996
Thomas J. Silhavy	Princeton University	2005
Robert F. Siliciano	Johns Hopkins University	2017
Eric P. Skaar	Vanderbilt University Medical Center	2025
John Skehel	Francis Crick Institute	2014
Joseph Smadel (died 1963)	National Institutes of Health	1957
Rotem Sorek	Weizmann Institute of Science	2025
Patricia G. Spear	Northwestern University	2002
Jesse Summers	University of New Mexico	2001
Jan Svoboda (died 2017)	Czech Academy of Sciences	2015
Igor Tamm (died 1995)	Rockefeller University	1975
William Trager (died 2005)	Rockefeller University	1973
Youyou Tu	China Academy of Chinese Medical Sciences	2025
Rodney K. Tweten	University of Oklahoma Health Sciences Center	2025
Herbert W. Virgin IV	Washington University in St. Louis	2016
Peter K. Vogt	Scripps Research Institute	1980
Selman A. Waksman (died 1973)	Rutgers University	1942
Duard L. Walker (died 2009)	University of Wisconsin–Madison	1990
Robert G. Webster	St. Jude Children's Research Hospital	1998
Robin A. Weiss (died 2026)	University of London	2013
Susan R. Weiss	University of Pennsylvania	2023
Thomas E. Wellems	NIH	2007
Thomas H. Weller (died 2008)	Harvard School of Public Health	1964
Ian A. Wilson	Scripps Research Institute	2016
Eckard Wimmer	Stony Brook University	2012
Elizabeth Winzeler	University of California, San Diego	2025
Ralph S. Wolfe (died 2019)	University of Illinois at Urbana–Champaign	1981
