= Enzo Paoletti =

Italian-American virologist

- Born: May 22, 1943; Monti di Villa, Bagni di Lucca, Lucca, Italy
- Died: January 17, 2018 (aged 74)
- Occupation: Virologist

Enzo Paoletti (May 22, 1943 – January 17, 2018) was an Italian-American virologist who developed the technology to express foreign antigens in vaccinia and other poxviruses. This advance led to the development of vaccines against multiple disease-causing pathogens.

== Education ==
Enzo Paoletti was born in Monti di Villa, Bagni di Lucca, Lucca, Italy on May 22, 1943. He emigrated with his family to New York in 1951. Paoletti received B.A. degree from Canisius College in Buffalo, New York in 1966 and he earned a Ph.D. from State University of New York at Buffalo, Roswell Park Division in 1971. Early in his graduate studies, Paoletti co-authored a paper that described, for the first time, RNA polymerase activity in vaccinia virus - a key finding noted by Dr. David Baltimore in his Nobel Lecture delivered in 1975. Paoletti's postdoctoral years were spent in the laboratory of Dr. Bernard Moss at National Institutes of Health, National Institute of Allergy and Infectious Diseases, Laboratory of Biology of Viruses, Bethesda, Maryland.

== Career and research achievements ==
In 1974, Paoletti joined the Wadsworth Center for Laboratories and Research at the New York State Department of Health in Albany as a senior research scientist. Four seminal papers, all published in the Proceedings of the National Academy of Sciences with Dennis Panicali and others provided the technology and proof of principle to construct live vaccines using genetically engineered poxviruses. In 1990 Paoletti's laboratory was the first to sequence the genome of vaccinia virus, an achievement gained without the use of high-throughput DNA sequencers.

In 1981, Paoletti founded and was the Founding Scientist of Virogenetics Corporation, a private, for-profit company based in Troy, New York to commercialize vectored vaccines. Over the years, highly attenuated poxvirus vectors (NYVAC, ALVAC and TROVAC) that induced cell-mediated and humoral responses were developed.

Vaccines against several pathogens including avian influenza virus, Newcastle disease virus, cytomegalovirus, canine distemper virus, feline leukemia virus, feline immunodeficiency virus, equine influenza virus, equine herpes virus, Japanese encephalitis virus, human T cell leukemia/lymphoma virus type 1, African horse sickness virus, rabbit hemorrhagic disease virus, herpes simplex virus, hepatitis C virus, bluetongue virus, pseudorabies virus, and diseases such as malaria, HIV, and tuberculosis were developed using engineered poxvirus vectors. While many vaccines are in preclinical or clinical development, six have been licensed for veterinary use.

A prime-dose regimen with canarypox ALVAC-HIV (vCP1521) vaccine and HIV-1 gp120 AIDSVAX B/E was found to be safe, well tolerated and 31.2% effective for the prevention of HIV acquisition in HIV-uninfected adults in Thailand.

Poxvirus vectors have also been used to develop vaccines against specific cancers.

This highly-adaptable viral vectored vaccine platform has been adopted by researchers to prevent infection against many pathogens, including the pandemic-causing SARS-CoV-2

== Awards and academic affiliations ==
Paoletti received numerous awards including: New York State Regents Scholarship, the National Institutes of Health Predoctoral Traineeship, the New York State Department of Health Predoctoral Fellowship, National Institutes of Health Postdoctoral Fellowship, Il Leone Di San Marco Award for Science (1984) and Rhone- Poulenc Prix Innovation (1991).

He was affiliated with several scientific societies namely: American Society for Microbiology, American Society for Virology, American Association for the Advancement of Science, New York State Academy of Science, American Society of Tropical Medicine and Hygiene and the International Association of Biological Standardization.

Paoletti also served as on the editorial board of several journals including Journal of Virology, and Virology. He held adjunct professorships at SUNY-Albany, Rensselaer Polytechnic Institute and Albany Medical College of Union University.

== Patents ==
Google Patent of Paoletti's patents
