= Dennis J. O'Callaghan =

American virologist (1940–2026)

Dennis John O'Callaghan (July 26, 1940 – March 30, 2026) was an American virologist, immunologist and biochemist. He was an internationally recognized expert on the molecular biology of the equine herpesviruses.

== Life and career ==
O'Callaghan was born in New Orleans, Louisiana, on July 26, 1940. He graduated in 1962 with a B.S. in biology from Loyola University New Orleans and in 1968 with a Ph.D. in microbiology from the University of Mississippi Medical Center. His Ph.D. thesis is entitled Biochemical studies of equine abortion virus replication in L-M cells. He trained under the direction of Charles Chandler Randall (1913–2007). At the University of Alberta Medical Center in Edmonton, Canada, O'Callaghan was from 1968 to 1970 a postdoctoral research fellow and from 1970 to 1971 an assistant professor of biochemistry. In the department of microbiology of the University of Mississippi Medical Center, he was an assistant professor from 1971 to 1974, an associate professor from 1974 to 1977, and a full professor from 1977 to 1984. From 1984 until his retirement as professor emeritus in 2018, he was a professor and chair of the department of microbiology and immunology at LSU Health Sciences Center Shreveport. There he established the Center for Molecular and Tumor Virology.

He served on the editorial boards of Virus Research, Virology, Recent Research Developments in Virology, and the Journal of Virology. In the early 1990s, on behalf of Research Corporation Technologies, Inc. headquartered in Tucson, Arizona, he patented an antibody protective against EHV-1. He and Nikolaus Osterrieder contributed the chapter Equine herpesviruses (Herpesviridae) to the 1999 edition of the Encyclopedia of Virology.

O'Callaghan was the president of the American Society for Virology (ASV) for the academic year 2000–2001. He was elected in 2002 a fellow of the American Association for the Advancement of Science.

His research on the biochemistry of herpesviruses reveals how viral regulator proteins govern the viral genome's expression. He and his colleagues have elucidated "the functional domains of viral regulatory proteins, the interactions of viral and cellular proteins, and how these interactions either up-regulate or retard viral gene expression."

In June 1967 in Jackson, Mississippi, he married Helen Frances Briscoe (1941–2018), a medical geneticist and watercolorist. They became the parents of one son and the grandparents of twin grandsons.

O'Callaghan died from cancer on March 30, 2026, at the age of 85.

== Selected publications ==
- Perdue, Michael L.; Kemp, Maurice C.; Randall, Charles C.; O'Callaghan, Dennis J. (1974). "Studies of the molecular anatomy of the L-M cell strain of equine herpes virus type 1: Proteins of the nucleocapsid and intact virion". Virology. 59 (1): 201–216. doi:10.1016/0042-6822(74)90216-5. PMID 4826204.
- Perdue, Michael L.; Cohen, James C.; Randall, Charles C.; O'Callaghan, Dennis J. (1976). "Biochemical studies of the maturation of herpesvirus nucleocapsid species". Virology. 74 (1): 194–208. doi:10.1016/0042-6822(76)90141-0. PMID 18625460.
- Allen, George P.; O'Callaghan, Dennis J.; Randall, Charles C. (1977). "Purification and characterization of equine herpesvirus-induced DNA polymerase". Virology. 76 (1): 395–408. doi:10.1016/0042-6822(77)90311-7. PMID 13532.
- Henry, Berch E.; Glaser, R.; Hewetson, J.; O'Callaghan, Dennis J. (1978). "Expression of altered ribonucleotide reductase activity associated with the replication of the Epstein-Barr virus". Virology. 89 (1): 262–271. doi:10.1016/0042-6822(78)90058-2. PMID 210572.
- Robinson, R. A.; Tucker, P. W.; Dauenhauer, S. A.; O'Callaghan, D. J. (1981). "Molecular cloning of equine herpesvirus type 1 DNA: Analysis of standard and defective viral genomes and viral sequences in oncogenically transformed cells". Proceedings of the National Academy of Sciences. 78 (11): 6684–6688. Bibcode:1981PNAS...78.6684R. doi:10.1073/pnas.78.11.6684. PMC 349114. PMID 6273883.
- Henry, Berch E.; Robinson, Robin A.; Dauenhauer, Steven A.; Atherton, Sally S.; Hayward, Gary S.; O'Callaghan, Dennis J. (1981). "Structure of the genome of equine herpesvirus type 1". Virology. 115 (1): 97–114. doi:10.1016/0042-6822(81)90092-1. PMID 6270904.
- o'Callaghan, Dennis J.; Gentry, Glenn A.; Randall, Charles C. (1983). "The Equine Herpesviruses". The Herpesviruses. pp. 215–318. doi:10.1007/978-1-4684-7012-3_5. ISBN 978-1-4684-7014-7.
- Caughman, Gretchen B.; Staczek, John; O'Callaghan, Dennis J. (1985). "Equine herpesvirus type 1 infected cell polypeptides: Evidence for immediate early/Early/Late regulation of viral gene expression". Virology. 145 (1): 49–61. doi:10.1016/0042-6822(85)90200-4. PMID 2990102.
- Gray, Wayne L.; Baumann, Raymond P.; Robertson, Alice T.; Caughman, Gretchen B.; O'Callaghan, Dennis J.; Staczek, John (1987). "Regulation of equine herpesvirus type 1 gene expression: Characterization of immediate early, early, and late transcription". Virology. 158 (1): 79–87. doi:10.1016/0042-6822(87)90240-6. PMID 3033896.
- Smith, R. H.; Caughman, G. B.; O'Callaghan, D. J. (1992). "Characterization of the regulatory functions of the equine herpesvirus 1 immediate-early gene product". Journal of Virology. 66 (2): 936–945. doi:10.1128/jvi.66.2.936-945.1992. PMC 240795. PMID 1309921.
- Osterrieder, Nikolaus; Neubauer, Antonie; Brandmüller, Christine; Kaaden, Oskar-Rüger; O'Callaghan, Dennis J. (1996). "The Equine Herpesvirus 1 IR6 Protein Influences Virus Growth at Elevated Temperature and is a Major Determinant of Virulence". Virology. 226 (2): 243–251. doi:10.1006/viro.1996.0652. PMID 8955044.
- Bowles, D. E.; Holden, V. R.; Zhao, Y.; O'Callaghan, D. J. (1997). "The ICP0 protein of equine herpesvirus 1 is an early protein that independently transactivates expression of all classes of viral promoters". Journal of Virology. 71 (7): 4904–4914. doi:10.1128/jvi.71.7.4904-4914.1997. PMC 191720. PMID 9188552.
- Matsumura, Tomio; Kondo, Takashi; Sugita, Shigeo; Damiani, Armando M.; O'Callaghan, Dennis J.; Imagawa, Hiroshi (1998). "An Equine Herpesvirus Type 1 Recombinant with a Deletion in the gE and gI Genes is Avirulent in Young Horses". Virology. 242 (1): 68–79. doi:10.1006/viro.1997.8984. PMID 9501037.
