= American Society for Virology =

The American Society for Virology (ASV) is an American scientific society serving the community of researchers in virology. The organization was founded in 1981 and was the first scientific society in the world dedicated exclusively to virology.

== Founding and history ==
Historically, virology has been considered a subdiscipline of microbiology. The motivation for founding a society specifically for virologists dates to the mid-1960s and originated in the community's dissatisfaction with its representation in existing microbiology societies, most notably the International Association of Microbiological Societies and the American Society for Microbiology. The society was formally founded following a meeting organized by Bernard Roizman of 40 prominent virology researchers at O'Hare International Airport in Chicago on June 9, 1981. Its first official annual meeting, organized by Milt Zaitlin, took place at Cornell University in August 1982—its membership had reached almost 1,000 scientists.

The founding president of the ASV was Wolfgang Joklik—who served from 1981 to 1983. Other notable founding members who signed letters sent to members of the virology community soliciting opinions about the possible future society in advance of the O'Hare meeting were David Baltimore, Purnell Choppin, Harold Ginsberg, Thomas Merigan, Bernard Roizman, Peter K. Vogt, Bob Wagner, Julius Youngner, and Norton Zinder. Ginsberg, Wagner, Choppin, and Youngner all served subsequent terms as president.

== Activities ==
The ASV continues to host an annual scientific meeting every summer on a selected university campus in the United States or Canada. The society also hosts career and educational information—including an online jobs directory—and received a grant from the Alfred Sloan Foundation to support a website documenting the history of virology. The website is maintained by former ASV president Sondra Schlesinger.

Since April 2021, the society's president has been Dr. Colin Parrish of Cornell University.

== Organization ==
As of 2015, the ASV contained councils for seven subdisciplines: plant virology, animal virology, evolution and ecology, medical virology, veterinary virology, invertebrate virology, and prokaryotic virology.

The ASV is led by elected officers. The elected officers are a President, Immediate Past-President, President-Elect, and Secretary-Treasurer—all of whom are elected by ASV members. The President-Elect is elected each year and serves one year in that role before serving as President in the following year and the Immediate Past-President the year after that. The Secretary-Treasurer is elected once every five years as Secretary-Treasurer-Elect and serves a five-year term as Secretary-Treasurer starting the next year.

== Presidents of the ASV ==
- Wolfgang Joklik, 1981–1983
- Harold S. Ginsberg, 1983–1984
- Robert R. Wagner, 1984–1985
- Purnell W. Choppin, 1985–1986
- Julius S. Youngner, 1986–1987
- Paul J. Kaesberg, 1987–1988
- Kenneth I. Berns, 1988–1989
- Roland R. Rueckert, 1989–1990
- Bernard N. Fields, 1990–1991
- Max D. Summers, 1991–1992
- Sondra Schlesinger, 1992–1993
- Kathryn V. Holmes, 1993–1994
- Bernard Moss, 1994–1995
- Gail W. Wertz, 1995–1996
- Mary K. Estes, 1996–1997
- Thomas E. Shenk, 1997–1998
- Peter M. Howley, 1998–1999
- Diane E. Griffin, 1999–2000
- Dennis J. O'Callaghan, 2000–2001
- Robert A. Lamb, 2001–2002
- Charles M. Rice, 2002–2003
- Patricia G. Spear, 2003–2004
- Lynn W. Enquist, 2004–2005
- Peter Palese, 2005–2006
- Don Ganem, 2006–2007
- Ann C. Palmenberg, 2007–2008
- Harry B. Greenberg, 2008–2009
- Rozanne Sandri-Goldin, 2009–2010
- Terence S. Dermody, 2010–2011
- Bert L. Semler, 2011–2012
- Barbara Sherry, 2012–2013
- Paula Traktman, 2013–2014
- Vincent R. Racaniello, 2014–2015
- Grant McFadden, 2015–2016
- Rebecca E. Dutch, 2016–2017
- Stacey Schultz-Cherry, 2017–2018
- Andrew S. Pekosz, 2018–2019
- Kristen A. Bernard, 2019–2020
- Colin Parrish, 2021–
