= Ann C. Palmenberg =

American biochemist

Ann C. Palmenberg was a professor of virology and biochemistry at the University of Wisconsin-Madison. She received her B.S. from St. Lawrence University and her Ph.D. from the University of Wisconsin-Madison. Before returning to the University of Wisconsin-Madison, Palmenberg worked as postdoctoral fellow in Zurich.

Palmenberg received numerous awards for her research and involvement within the scientific community, such as Fellow for the American Academy of Microbiology. News articles have been published about her work within virology, including an article in the Milwaukee Journal Sentinel on her findings on the common cold. She was also the president of the American Society for Virology in 2007.

== Background ==
She took a lot of inspiration from her great uncle who was a chemist, but the main thing that made her pursue her career was when the polio vaccine was first given out and she got it at school.

== Leadership and service ==
- Reviewer for Journal of Virology, Archives of Virology, Virology, Cell, Journal of Molecular Biology, EMBO Journal, PNAS, Science, Nature, Virus Research, and Biochemistry journals from 1975–Present

== Awards ==
Ann Palmenberg has received several awards within the science community for her achievements, including the following:

- The College of Agricultural & Life Sciences awarded the Honorary Recognition Award in 2024
- Made a Fellow of the American Academy of Microbiology in 2009
- Elected as President for the American Society for Virology in 2007
- Awarded the Distinguished Scientist Award from the University of Nebraska-Lincoln in 2006
- Awarded an American Society for Virology Lifetime Membership in 2001
- Elected Chair for the Institute of Molecular Virology at the University of Wisconsin-Madison from 1997-2013
- Awarded the WARF Faculty Mid-Career Award from the University of Wisconsin-Madison in 1997
- Awarded the Vilas Associate Award from the University of Wisconsin-Madison in 1996
- Awarded the H.I. Romnes Faculty Research Award from the University of Wisconsin-Madison in 1991
- Awarded the Pound Research Award from the University of Wisconsin-Madison in 1990
- Awarded the Distinguished Scientist Award from the Waksman Institute of Rutgers University in 1989
- Commended by Pan American Foot-and-Mouth Disease Center for Work in the Control and Eradication Programs in South America in 1988

== Publications ==
The following are the most notable of her 93 publications for which Ann Palmenberg has been a major contributor.

- The Atomic Structure of Mengo Virus at 3.0 A Resolution
- Proteolytic Processing of Picornaviral Polyprotein
- Sequencing and Analyses of All Known Human Rhinovirus Genomes Reveal Structure and Evolution
- Sequence and Structural Elements that Contribute to Efficient Encephalomyocarditis Virus RNA Translation
- The Nucleotide and Deduced Amino Acid sequences of the Encephalomyocarditis Viral Polyprotein Coding Region
