= Ralph Isberg =

Ralph R. Isberg
- Born: January 3, 1955; Detroit, Michigan, U.S.
- Education: Oberlin College; Harvard University
- Scientific career
- Fields: Microbiology
- Workplaces: Tufts University School of Medicine

Ralph R. Isberg (born January 3, 1955) is a professor at Tufts University School of Medicine known for his contributions to understanding microbial pathogenesis. He is a member of the American National Academy of Sciences and was an investigator of the Howard Hughes Medical Institute for 27 years. A microbiologist, Isberg has published over 185 peer-reviewed articles and is or has been an editor of the Proceedings of the National Academy of Sciences, PLoS Pathogens, and Journal of Experimental Medicine, among others.

== Early life ==
Isberg was born in Detroit, Michigan, on January 3, 1955.

== Education and career ==
Isberg received an A.B. from Oberlin College (1977) and a Ph.D. from Harvard University (1984), performing his thesis on the mechanisms of Tn5 transposition in Michael Syvanen's laboratory. He performed his post-doctoral research in Stanley Falkow's lab at Stanford University (1984-1986), where he initiated studies of the entry of the bacterial pathogen Yersinia pseudotuberculosis into mammalian cells. He joined Tufts University's Sackler School of Graduate Biomedical Sciences in 1986 and is currently Professor of Molecular Biology & Microbiology there. He is also the co-director of the Center for Enteric Disease in Engineered Tissues (CEDET) and Program Director of Molecular Basis of Microbial Pathogenesis.

Isberg has mentored over 20 Ph.D. students, and over 40 post-doctoral fellows.

== Research ==
Isberg's research has mainly been in the field of microbial pathogenesis. His lab focuses on the pathogenesis of Legionella pneumophila and Yersinia pseudotuberculosis, especially the ways these pathogens enter and regulate host mammalian cells.

== Honors and awards ==
Isberg has received many honors and awards, including:

- 1983-1986: Jane Coffin Childs Memorial Fund Postdoctoral Fellow, Stanford University
- 1987-1992: Presidential Young Investigator Award, NSF
- 1993: Eli Lilly Award, American Society for Microbiology
- 2009: Member, American National Academy of Sciences

== Personal life ==
Isberg is married to Carol Kumamoto, also a professor at the Sackler School of Graduate Biomedical Sciences, and has two children, Max and Robyn.

Isberg is known for constructing a hockey rink in his back yard each winter.
