= Hematopoietic growth factor =

Group of glycoproteins

Hematopoietic growth factor is a group of glycoproteins that causes blood cells to grow and mature (Haematopoiesis). "A group of at least seven substances involved in the production of blood cells, including several interleukins and erythropoietin."

It is a synonym of hemopoietic growth factor.
