= Robert A. Lamb =

British-American virologist (1950–2023)

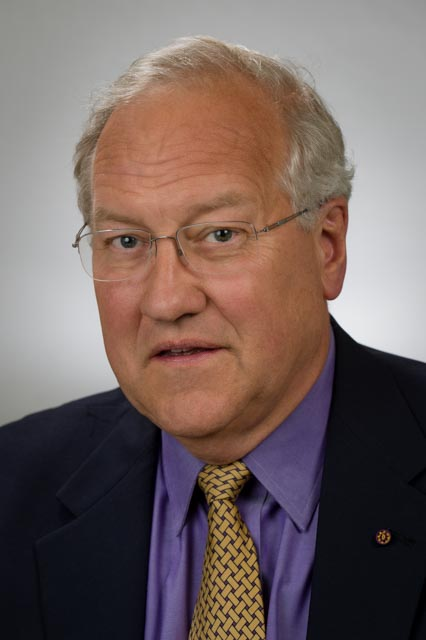
- Born: September 26, 1950; Muswell Hill, London, England
- Died: September 2, 2023 (aged 72)
- Title: Kenneth F. Burgess Professor

Academic background
- Education: University of Birmingham (B.Sc., 1971); University of Cambridge (Ph.D., 1974)
- Doctoral advisor: Brian Mahy

Academic work
- Institutions: Northwestern University

Robert Andrew Lamb (September 26, 1950 – September 2, 2023) was a British-American virologist. He was the Kenneth F. Burgess Professor at Northwestern University and since 1991, an investigator of the Howard Hughes Medical Institute. From 1990 to 2016, he was the John Evans Professor of Molecular and Cellular Biology at Northwestern University.

Lamb's research focused on influenza and paramyxoviruses. His work on mechanism of action of viral proteins has had a significant impact on the field of virology. His research in this area has led to the development of new vaccines and medicines. Lamb has also done considerable research on how cells work.

For his contributions to the field of virology, Lamb has won several awards. In 1990, he was awarded the Wallace P. Rowe Award for Excellence in Virology Research. In 2003, he was elected to the National Academy of Sciences and in 2010, the University of Birmingham awarded him an Sc.D. honoris causa. He also won consecutive MERIT awards from the National Institutes of Health 1987-2006 and 2007-2016.

== Early life and education ==
Lamb was born on September 26, 1950, in Muswell Hill, London. His uncle was a chemist, who encouraged Lamb to follow the same field. Lamb completed his B.Sc. in Biochemistry from University of Birmingham in 1971 followed by Ph.D. in Virology from University of Cambridge in 1974. His doctoral advisor was Brian Mahy and his thesis was about Sendai virus and explained how the virus replicates.

== Career ==
Right after completing his Ph.D., Lamb moved to the United States and joined The Rockefeller University, New York for a postdoctoral program in virology. At The Rockefeller University, he worked with Purnell Choppin. Lamb was appointed assistant professor at The Rockefeller University in 1977, leaving the institute in 1982. In 1983, he joined Northwestern University as an associate professor where he established the Lamb Laboratory.

The University of Cambridge awarded Lamb an Sc.D. in 1990 and Northwestern University appointed him the John Evans Professor of Molecular and Cellular Biology. In 1991, he joined the Howard Hughes Medical Institute as an investigator. He was appointed president of the American Society for Virology for a one-year term in 2001. Lamb became Fellow of the American Association for the Advancement of Science in 1999, elected to the National Academy of Sciences in 2003 and Fellow of the American Academy of Arts and Sciences in 2007. In 2010, the University of Birmingham awarded him an Sc.D. honoris causa.

Lamb was appointed chair of the Department of Molecular Biosciences at Northwestern University in 2011 and served in this position until 2017. In 2016, he was appointed the Kenneth F. Burgess Professor at Northwestern University.

From 1987 to 1993, Lamb was an editor of the Journal of Virology and from 1994 to 2012, he was the editor-in-chief of Virology. He served on the editorial board of Cell from 2006 to 2015. Lamb has been a member and chair of the Study Group on Paramyxoviridae, International Committee on the Taxonomy of Viruses, since 1997.

=== Research ===
While Lamb was at The Rockefeller University, he published 22 papers with Purnell Choppin. Their work mainly focused on sequencing viral genes and characterizing viral proteins. During this time, Lamb characterized the influenza A virus M2 protein, which became the focus of much of his later work.

After moving to Northwestern University, Evanston, Illinois, US, Lamb set up his namesake laboratory, where he has since conducted research and collaborated with several scientists. His laboratory has studied influenza virus and paramyxoviruses, more specifically, how they replicate. They have also studied the action of the M2 and BM2 proteins and enveloped virus assembly. Lamb's research has had a significant impact on the understanding of how viruses work at the molecular level through different points in the life cycle.

In 1997, Lamb and his team developed a way to stop influenza viruses from leaving their host cells, and stop the viruses at the end of their replication cycle. They found out that by disabling hemagglutinin and neuraminidase, the number of viruses exiting from the host cells decreased by 90%. Hence, they proved that hemagglutinin and neuraminidase are necessary for a complete viral replication cycle. In further research, Lamb concluded that hemagglutinin gathers at lipid rafts for an adequate concentration in the budding viruses, which results in easy entry into the next cell.

In collaboration with Ted Jardetzky, Lamb determined the molecular structure of one of the pre- and post-fusion forms of the paramyxovirus fusion protein, which causes the virus membrane to fuse with the cell surface membrane. Studies on the fusion protein were applicable to the envelope proteins of SARS coronavirus, HIV and Ebola virus. All of the viral fusion proteins undergo a remarkable protein refolding event and this process brings about fusion of the viral and cellular membranes.

In 1992 (for influenza A virus) and 2003 (for influenza B virus), Lamb's lab, in collaboration with Lawrence Pinto, discovered that M2 and BM2 membrane proteins of influenza A and B viruses are ion channels. Their work led to the understanding that both proteins are necessary for influenza A and B virus infection and replication.

== Death ==
Lamb died on September 2, 2023, at the age of 72.

== Awards and honors ==
- 1974-1977 - Fulbright-Hays Scholar
- 1979-1983 - Irma T. Hirschl Career Scientist Award
- 1980 - Phoebe Weinstein Award for Creativity in Negative Strand Virus Research
- 1982-1987 - Established Investigator of the American Heart Association
- 1987 - National Institutes of Health MERIT Award
- 1990 - Wallace P. Rowe Award for Excellence in Virologic Research, awarded by National Institute of Allergy and Infectious Diseases, National Institutes of Health
- 2010 - Sc.D. honoris causa by University of Birmingham

== Selected articles ==
- The gene structure and replication of influenza virus. Annual Review of Biochemistry (1983)
- Influenza virus M2 protein is an integral membrane protein expressed on the infected-cell surface. Cell (1985)
- Two mRNAs that differ by two non-templated nucleotides encode the amino co-terminal proteins P and V of the paramyxovirus SV5. Cell (1988)
- Influenza A virus M2 protein: monoclonal antibody restriction of virus growth and detection of M2 in virions. Journal of Virology (1988)
- Influenza virus M2 protein has ion channel activity. Cell (1992)
- Folding and assembly of viral membrane proteins. Virology (1993)
- Ion channel activity of influenza A virus M2 protein: characterization of the amantadine block. Journal of Virology (1993)
- Paramyxovirus fusion: a hypothesis for changes. Virology (1993)
- Structural basis for paramyxovirus-mediated membrane fusion. Molecular Cell (1999)
- Orthomyxoviridae: the viruses and their replication. Fields Virology (2001)
- Structure of the uncleaved ectodomain of the paramyxovirus (hPIV3) fusion protein. Proceedings of the National Academy of Sciences (2005)
- Structure of the parainfluenza virus 5 F protein in its metastable, pre-fusion conformation. Nature (2006)
- The M2 proton channels of influenza A and B viruses. Journal of Biological Chemistry (2006)
- A new influenza virus virulence determinant: the NS1 protein four C-terminal residues modulate pathogenicity. Proceedings of the National Academy of Sciences (2008)
- Influenza virus M2 protein mediates ESCRT-independent membrane scission. Cell (2010)
- Influenza virus assembly and budding. Virology (2011)
- Structure of the Newcastle disease virus hemagglutinin-neuraminidase (HN) ectodomain reveals a four-helix bundle stalk. Proceedings of the National Academy of Sciences (2011)
- Fusion activation by a headless parainfluenza virus 5 hemagglutinin-neuraminidase stalk suggests a modular mechanism for triggering. Proceedings of the National Academy of Sciences (2012)
- Viral Membrane Scisson. Annual Review of Cell and Developmental Biology (2013)
- Structure and stabilization of the Hendra virus F glycoprotein in its prefusion form. Proceedings of the National Academy of Sciences (2012)
- Activation of paramyxovirus membrane fusion and viral entry. Current Opinion in Virology (2014)
- Probing the functions of the paramyxovirus glycoproteins F and HN with a panel of synthetic antibodies (sABs). Journal of Virology (2014)
