= Milton Zaitlin =

American plant pathologist (1927–2016)

- Born: April 2, 1927; Mt. Vernon, New York
- Died: October 11, 2016 (aged 89); Ithaca, New York
- Education: University of California, Berkeley, University of California, Los Angeles
- Scientific career
- Fields: Virology
- Workplaces: Cornell University
- Doctoral advisor: Samuel G. Wildman

Milton Zaitlin (April 2, 1927 – October 11, 2016) was an American virologist who spent most of his academic career as a professor of plant pathology at Cornell University in Ithaca, New York.

== Education and academic career ==
Zaitlin was born on April 2, 1927, in Mt. Vernon, New York. He was an undergraduate at the University of California, Berkeley, from which he received his bachelor's degree in plant pathology in 1949. After a brief period conducting research at the California Institute of Technology, he attended the University of California, Los Angeles, from which he received his Ph.D. in 1954 under the supervision of Samuel G. Wildman. He spent four years working as a research officer for CSIRO in Australia before returning to the United States to work at the University of Missouri in Columbia.

In 1960, Zaitlin joined the faculty at the University of Arizona in the Department of Agricultural Biochemistry, where he remained until 1973. During this period he was awarded a Guggenheim Fellowship and Fulbright scholarship, which supported a return to CSIRO in Australia. He moved to Cornell University in Ithaca, New York, in 1973 and remained there until his retirement, assuming professor emeritus status, in 1997.

Zaitlin was one of the founding members of the American Society for Virology and was the organizer of its inaugural annual meeting at Cornell in August 1982.

== Research ==
Zaitlin focused his research on plant viruses, especially on mechanisms of replication, the effects of mutants on the viral replication cycle, and mechanisms of resistance to viral infections. He was particularly influential in the study of tobacco mosaic virus, a model system for the study of viral infections of plants on which he co-edited a positively reviewed book with Karen-Beth G. Scholthof and John G. Shaw. He has been listed as a "pioneering plant pathologist" by the American Phytopathological Society.

== Awards and honors ==
- Elected fellow of the American Association for the Advancement of Science, 1969
- Elected fellow of the American Phytopathological Society, 1978
- American Phytopathological Society Award of Distinction, 2006
