= Paula Traktman =

American virologist and academic administrator

- Citizenship: US
- Education: Harvard University; Massachusetts Institute of Technology
- Partner: Stephen A. Duncan
- Children: 2
- Scientific career
- Institutions: Weill Cornell Medicine; Medical College of Wisconsin; Medical University of South Carolina

Paula Traktman is an American virologist and academic administrator at the Medical University of South Carolina. She is an elected fellow of the American Association for the Advancement of Science and the American Academy of Microbiology. From 2013 to 2014 she was the president of the American Society for Virology.

== Early life and education ==
Paula Traktman was born to parents Mortimer and Esther Traktman and grew up in New York with one brother, David. She attended Harvard University for her undergraduate degree and the Massachusetts Institute of Technology (MIT) for her PhD. She then completed postdoctoral research appointments at MIT and Harvard Medical School.

== Career ==
In 1984 Traktman joined the faculty of Weill Cornell Medicine as an assistant professor in the Cell Biology and Anatomy Department as well as the Microbiology Department. She was promoted in 1990 to associate professor and in 1995 to full professor. She was hired at the Medical College of Wisconsin in 1997, becoming the chairperson of the Department of Microbiology and Molecular Genetics. In 2015 she joined the Medical University of South Carolina as the dean of its College of Graduate Studies.

== Awards and honors ==
In 2007 Traktman was elected as a fellow of the American Association for the Advancement of Science. She served as the president of the American Society for Virology from 2013 to 2014. In 2013, the American Academy of Microbiology also elected her as fellow.

== Personal life ==
Traktman is married to Stephen A. Duncan. They have two children.
