= Wolfgang Joklik =

Duke University virologist

- Born: Wolfgang Karl Joklik; November 16, 1926; Vienna, Austria
- Died: July 7, 2019 (aged 92); Durham, North Carolina, U.S.
- Education: Sydney University; University of Oxford
- Scientific career
- Fields: Virology
- Workplaces: Duke University
- Academic advisors: Paul Fildes

Wolfgang Karl "Bill" Joklik (November 16, 1926 – July 7, 2019) was a virologist and James B. Duke Professor Emeritus of Molecular Genetics and Microbiology at Duke University, from which he retired in 1993 after 25 years chairing the department. In 1981, he founded the American Society for Virology, the first scientific society specifically for virologists, and served a two-year term as its founding president. In the same year, he was elected to the United States National Academy of Sciences. He has been described as "one of the earliest molecular virologists" and is best known for his research on poxviruses and reoviruses, and for work on interferon proteins.

== Early life and education ==
Joklik was born in 1926 in Austria, the son of Helene Louise Adele (Giessl) and Karl Friedrich Joklik. He moved with his family to Sydney, Australia at age 11. He attended the Cranbrook School in Sydney, where he and his brother would later endow a scholarship in honor of their mother. He received his B.Sc. and M.Sc. in biochemistry from Sydney University and received his Ph.D. in 1952 from the Sir William Dunn School of Pathology at Oxford University, where he worked on bacteriophage T1 and T2 (viruses that infect E. coli bacteria) under the supervision of Sir Paul Fildes. He spent a year as a postdoctoral fellow in Copenhagen working with Herman Kalckar and Paul Berg.

== Career ==
Joklik joined the microbiology department headed by Frank Fenner at the then-new Australian National University in Canberra in 1953 and remained there for nine years, working primarily on poxviruses. In 1959-60 he spent a year on sabbatical at the National Institutes of Health working with Harry Eagle, who subsequently relocated to the Albert Einstein College of Medicine in New York City and recruited Joklik to join him there in 1962. Joklik's research group there continued to work on poxviruses as well as vaccinia viruses and reoviruses. In 1968 Joklik moved to Duke University to chair the Department of Microbiology and Immunology, which he played a major role in developing from a small faculty of six to a large and nationally ranked department as of his retirement in 1993. Following the announcement of a "war on cancer" by President Richard Nixon in 1971, Joklik co-founded the Duke Comprehensive Cancer Center.

Joklik was well known for significant service to the scientific community during his career. In 1981 he was the primary organizer of a movement among American virologists to found a new scientific society, motivated by dissatisfaction with the community's representation in existing societies for general microbiology; he was a co-founder and the founding president of the American Society for Virology, which was organized in 1981 and held its first official meeting in 1982. Joklik served as editor-in-chief of Zinsser Microbiology, a standard text in medicine and immunology originated by Hans Zinsser. Joklik was also editor-in-chief of the scientific journal Virology for 24 years and of Microbiological Reviews for five years.

=== Smallpox eradication ===
Joklik's research on vaccinia viruses led to his selection as one of two United States representatives to the World Health Organization's Smallpox Eradication Committee in the 1970s, whose efforts came to a close in 1980 when natural smallpox infections were declared to be eradicated and research stocks retained only by the United States Centers for Disease Control and the State Research Center of Virology and Biotechnology VECTOR in the then-Soviet Union. Joklik was a highly vocal opponent of efforts in the 1990s to destroy the remaining stocks, delivering talks and writing several papers on the topic.

== Legacy ==
Joklik received the William G. Anlyan Lifetime Achievement Award from the Duke Medical Alumni Association in 2013. The Duke Department of Molecular Genetics and Microbiology (a successor to the department Joklik chaired) hosts an annual lectureship in his honor, the Joklik Distinguished Lectureship; the inaugural lecture was delivered in 2010 by fellow poxvirus specialist Bernard Moss. The annual meeting of the American Society for Virology features a Bill Joklik Lecture, among other named lectureships celebrating pioneers in the field. Joklik trained over 100 graduate students and postdoctoral fellows; among his notable trainees are Bernard N. Fields and John Skehel.

In retirement, Joklik continued to publish histories and retrospectives describing the history of the mid-20th-century emergence of molecular biology and the development of the modern field of virology. He died on July 7, 2019.
