= William Procter Prize for Scientific Achievement =

The William Procter Prize for Scientific Achievement is an award given by Sigma Xi, a scientific-research honor society. The Procter Prize is presented annually to a scientist who has made an outstanding contribution to scientific research and has demonstrated an ability to communicate the significance of this research to scientists in other disciplines.

The prize consists of a Steuben glass sculpture and $5,000. In addition, each recipient is asked to designate a younger scholar, usually working in the same field, to receive a $5,000 Grant-in-Aid of Research. Presentation of the Procter Prize is traditionally a principal event at the Sigma Xi Annual Meeting, where the recipient delivers the Procter Prize Address.

The Prize is named for William Procter, an heir of one of the founders of the Procter and Gamble Company. He was active in Sigma Xi and its affiliated organization, the Research Society of America (RESA), and endowed the award that bears his name in 1950, the year before he died.

== Previous winners ==
- 2022 - Rena Bizios
- 2021 - Baruch Fischhoff
- 2020 - Marcetta Y. Darensbourg
- 2019 - Ben Santer
- 2018 – Anna Marie Skalka
- 2016 – Jan Achenbach
- 2015 – David R. Williams
- 2014 – Jenny Glusker
- 2013 – Rita Colwell
- 2012 – Solomon W. Golomb
- 2011 – Supriyo Datta
- 2010 – Michael J. Spivey
- 2009 – Deborah S. Jin
- 2008 – Charles Elachi
- 2007 – Stuart Pimm
- 2006 – Susan L. Lindquist
- 2005 – Bjarne Stroustrup
- 2004 – Murray Gell-Mann
- 2003 – Darleane Hoffman
- 2002 – Benoit Mandelbrot
- 2001 – Alexander Rich
- 2000 – Francisco Ayala
- 1999 – Lynn Margulis
- 1998 – Carl Djerassi
- 1997 – Philip Morrison
- 1997 – Edward O. Wilson
- 1996 – Jane Goodall
- 1995 – Michael E. DeBakey
- 1994 – Stephen Jay Gould
- 1993 – Walter H. Stockmayer
- 1991 – Leon Lederman
- 1990 – Robert Ballard
- 1989 – Janet Rowley
- 1988 – Sir John Kendrew
- 1987 – James Van Allen
- 1986 – Thomas Eisner
- 1985 – George C. Pimentel
- 1984 – Victor F. Weisskopf
- 1983 – Winona Vernberg and John Vernberg
- 1982 – Joshua Lederberg
- 1981 – George W. Beadle
- 1980 – Herbert A. Simon
- 1979 – Saunders Mac Lane
- 1978 – Russell W. Peterson
- 1977 – William Nierenberg
- 1976 – Morris Cohen
- 1975 – Dixy Lee Ray
- 1974 – Percy Lavon Julian
- 1973 – William O. Baker
- 1972 – Lewis M. Branscomb
- 1971 – Jacob E. Goldman
- 1970 – Lloyd M. Cooke
- 1969 – Margaret Mead
- 1968 – Athelstan Spilhaus
- 1967 – Abel Wolman
- 1966 – Elmer Engstrom
- 1965 – William H. Pickering
- 1964 – Hugh S. Taylor
- 1963 – Edwin H. Land
- 1962 – Joel H. Hildebrand
- 1961 – Edward Ray Weidlein
- 1960 – Alan Tower Waterman
- 1959 – Charles Stark Draper
- 1958 – Chauncey Guy Suits
- 1957 – Crawford H. Greenwalt
- 1956 – Lawrence R. Hafstad
- 1955 – Robert R. Williams
- 1954 – Vannevar Bush
- 1953 – David Barnard Steinman
- 1952 – Shields Warren
- 1951 – Ernest O. Lawrence
- 1950 – Karl Compton
