= Annual Review of Virology =

- Discipline: Virology
- Language: English
- Edited by: Terence S. Dermody

Publication details
- History: 2014–present, 12 years old
- Publisher: Annual Reviews (US)
- Frequency: Annually
- Open access: Subscribe to Open
- Impact factor: 7.4 (2025)

Standard abbreviations
- ISO 4: Annu. Rev. Virol.

Indexing
- ISSN: 2327-056X (print); 2327-0578 (web)
- LCCN: 2013200665
- OCLC no.: 834373301

Links
- Journal homepage

The Annual Review of Virology is an annual peer-reviewed scientific journal published by Annual Reviews (AR). The journal covers all aspects of virology. It was established in 2014 and led by editor Lynn W. Enquist until October 2023 when Terence S. Dermody succeeded him. As of 2021, Annual Review of Virology was published as open access, under the Subscribe to Open model.

== History ==
The Annual Review of Virology was first published in 2014 by Annual Reviews (AR), a nonprofit organization whose stated mission is to synthesize knowledge "for the progress of science and the benefit of society." At this time, Annual Reviews published over forty journal titles covering different disciplines; while more than half of the existing journal titles contained review articles relevant to virology, developments in the field were not routinely covered. Published articles on the study of viruses were not easy for readers to locate, as they were decentralized in the other discipline-specific journals. Lynn W. Enquist (Princeton University) was the founding editor. As of October 2023, Terence S. Dermody became the editor of the journal. Though it was initially published in print, as of 2021 it is only published electronically.

== Scope and indexing ==
It defines its scope as covering significant developments in the study of all viruses, including those of animals, plants, bacteria, archaea, fungi, and protozoa. Review articles cover general virology, the mechanisms of viral disease, host–pathogen interactions, and cellular and immune responses to viral infection. As of 2026, Journal Citation Reports lists the journal's 2025 impact factor as 7.4, ranking it second of 44 journal titles in the category "Virology". It is abstracted and indexed in Scopus, Science Citation Index Expanded, MEDLINE, and Embase, among others.

== Editorial processes ==
The Annual Review of Virology is helmed by the editor or the co-editors. The editor is assisted by the editorial committee, which includes associate editors, regular members, and occasionally guest editors. Guest members participate at the invitation of the editor, and serve terms of one year. All other members of the editorial committee are appointed by the AR board of directors and serve five-year terms. The editorial committee determines which topics should be included in each volume and solicits reviews from qualified authors. Unsolicited manuscripts are not accepted. Peer review of accepted manuscripts is undertaken by the editorial committee.
