= Paul Joseph Kaesberg =

German biochemist and virologist

- Born: September 26, 1923; Engers, Germany
- Died: December 24, 2010 (aged 87)
- Education: University of Wisconsin-Madison
- Known for: Studying Biochemistry and Virology
- Spouse: Marian L. Kaesberg (m. 1953)
- Children: 3

Paul Joseph Kaesberg (September 26, 1923 – December 24, 2010) was a German-born American biochemist and virologist who was known worldwide for his extensive research regarding small viruses. His research significantly contributed to the our overall understanding of viruses today. Kaesberg is also known for discovering icosahedral-shaped viruses and for using X-rays to study viruses.

== Personal life ==
Paul J. Kaesberg was born in Engers district in Germany, on September 26, 1923. In 1926, his parents Gertrude and Peter Kaesberg, moved to the United States of America, and chose to settle in the city of West Bend, Wisconsin.

He married Marian L. Kaesberg on June 13, 1953, and the couple had three children.

== Education and career ==
Kaesberg completed elementary, middle, and high school in West Bend, Wisconsin. He studied physics at the University of Wisconsin-Madison and received his B.S. in 1945 and his Ph.D. in 1949. He then became a faculty member at his Alma mater and eventually became the university's highest-ranked biochemistry professor. He was also a virology professor. Kaesberg was a founder of the Institute for Molecular Virology at the University of Wisconsin-Madison.

== Memberships and awards ==
Kaesberg was a fellow of the American Academy of Microbiology and a former president of the American Society for Virology from 1987 to 1988. In 1991, he became a member of the National Academy of Sciences.

The University of Leiden in the Netherlands awarded Kaesberg with an Honorary Doctorate Degree in 1975.

== Research ==
Paul Kaesberg's research had major impacts on the fields of biochemistry and virology. Some of his most influential research involved bacteriophage morphology, mosaic viruses, and X-ray scattering.

=== Bacteriophage Morphology ===
In 1956, Kaesberg and his colleagues studied staphylococcus bacteriophages via electron microscopy and found that freeze-dried particles and air-dried particles had significant morphological differences, specifically in size and shape. They were then able to classify the phages into two serological categories: large with flattened heads and long tails and smaller with long tails and circular heads. They noted that phages within the same class had structural similarities, and phages from different classes differed in structure.

=== Mosaic Viruses ===
In 1955, Robert Rice and Kaesberg researched why the tobacco mosaic virus breaks apart after preservation via freeze-drying. Although they did not figure out what caused it specifically, their research allowed them to rule out several possibilities. They found that the act of freeze-drying did not cause the virus to break, as freeze-drying did not cause insulin fibrils or flagella to break. In 1956, Kaesberg discovered a new virus shape, the icosahedral shape. After taking electron micrographs of the bromegrass mosaic virus and the yellow turnip mosaic virus under light shadowing and heavy shadowing, respectfully, Kaesberg was able to come up with an icosahedral model of the viruses. This shape became the modern-day symbol for a virus because, after much more research, the icosahedral shape was one of the most commonly found virus shapes. In 1958, Kaesberg and colleagues discovered a mosaic virus found in alfalfa creates three macromolecules after infecting a plant. Only one of the types of particles produced the virus, but all three had a similar bacillus-like shape and size. These particles looked nothing like the known spherical species of the alfalfa mosaic virus, so they discovered a new isolate in their work. In 1964, Paul Kaesberg and a colleague studied the effects of pH changes on the bromegrass mosaic virus. They found that when the environment's pH is higher than 6.7, there is a decrease in the virus’ sedimentation coefficient. The coefficient goes back up if the pH goes below 6.7. An increase in pH also causes the virus’ intrinsic viscosity and diffusion coefficient to decrease. However, the radius of gyration increases with an increase in the environment's pH.

=== X-Ray Scattering ===
In 1953, Kaesberg and a few colleagues used x-ray scattering to determine the size and hydration of three different viruses: the southern bean mosaic virus, the tomato bushy stunt virus, and the tobacco necrosis virus. All three of the viruses had a sphere-like shape and internal hydration. They differed, however, in their diameters, with the tobacco necrosis virus having a diameter of 280 angstroms, the southern bean virus having a diameter of 286 angstroms, and the tomato bushy stunt virus having the largest diameter of them all: 309 angstroms. In 1954, Kaesberg and Paul Schmidt utilized small-angle X-ray scattering to measure the size of the yellow turnip mosaic virus and its associated protein. They found that both particles were almost spherical and the same size. They found that while the virus had a relatively constant electron density, the protein was a water-filled shell. In 1963, Margaret Wright and Paul Kaesberg used x-ray scattering to learn more about the inside of the bromegrass mosaic virus. They discovered that the virus had a 260 angstroms diameter and an inner region with an 80-angstrom diameter. Negatively stained bromegrass viruses had a slightly larger internal diameter, about 90 angstroms. They saw that the internal region was almost wholly empty and that the RNA and protein within the virus had almost equal electron densities. However, they noticed something different in the positively stained viruses. These viruses have nucleic acids compacted into a shell formation enveloped by proteins. For the RNA and protein portions of these viruses to have equivalent electron densities, the RNA must have a significantly higher hydration ratio than the protein.
