= Terence S. Dermody =

American virologist

- Education: Cornell University, Columbia University College of Physicians and Surgeons, Brigham and Women's Hospital, Harvard Medical School
- Occupations: Virologist, Doctor of Medicine, medical doctor, pediatrician, microbiologist, infectious disease physician
- Employers: UPMC Children's Hospital of Pittsburgh; University of Pittsburgh School of Medicine (2016–); University of Pittsburgh; Vanderbilt University (1990–2016)
- Awards: Fellow of the American Association for the Advancement of Science (2007)
- Website: www.pediatrics.pitt.edu/divisions/infectious-diseases/labs-and-faculty-pages/dermody-lab

Terence S. Dermody is an American virologist who is the Vira I. Heinz Distinguished Professor and Chair of Pediatrics at the University of Pittsburgh School of Medicine, where he teaches microbiology and infectious diseases. He is also the Physician-in-Chief and Scientific Director at UPMC Children's Hospital of Pittsburgh. Dermody studies fundamental mechanisms of the virus life cycle, particularly in reoviruses, to better understand the propagation of viruses, causes of disease, and possibilities for vaccine development. He is a Fellow of the American Association for the Advancement of Science.

== Education and training ==
Dermody earned his B.S. degree from Cornell University (1978) and his M.D. degree from Columbia University College of Physicians and Surgeons (1982). Dermody completed an internal medicine residency at Presbyterian Hospital in New York (1982-1985), followed by fellowships in infectious diseases and molecular virology at Brigham and Women's Hospital (1985-1986) and Harvard Medical School (1986-1988). Dermody was Instructor in Medicine at Harvard Medical School from 1988 to 1990.

== Career ==
In 1990, Dermody joined Vanderbilt University School of Medicine, where he was the Dorothy Overall Wells Professor of Pediatrics. He was appointed director of the Medical Scientist Training Program in 2003, and director of the Division of Pediatric Infectious Diseases in 2008. He also served as Adjunct Professor of Biomedical Sciences at Meharry Medical College.

In 2016, Dermody left Vanderbilt and became the Chair of the Department of Pediatrics at the University of Pittsburgh School of Medicine and Physician-in-Chief and Scientific Director at Children's Hospital of Pittsburgh.

Dermody has served as president of the American Society for Virology (2010–2011) and chair of the Virology Division of the International Union of Microbiological Societies (2016). He is a member of the American Academy of Microbiology and served on its Board of Governors. He is a member of the American Pediatric Society, American Society for Clinical Investigation, Association of American Physicians, and Society for Pediatric Research.

Dermody was an associate editor of the Annual Review of Virology when it was founded in 2014 and became the lead editor in 2023.

== Research ==
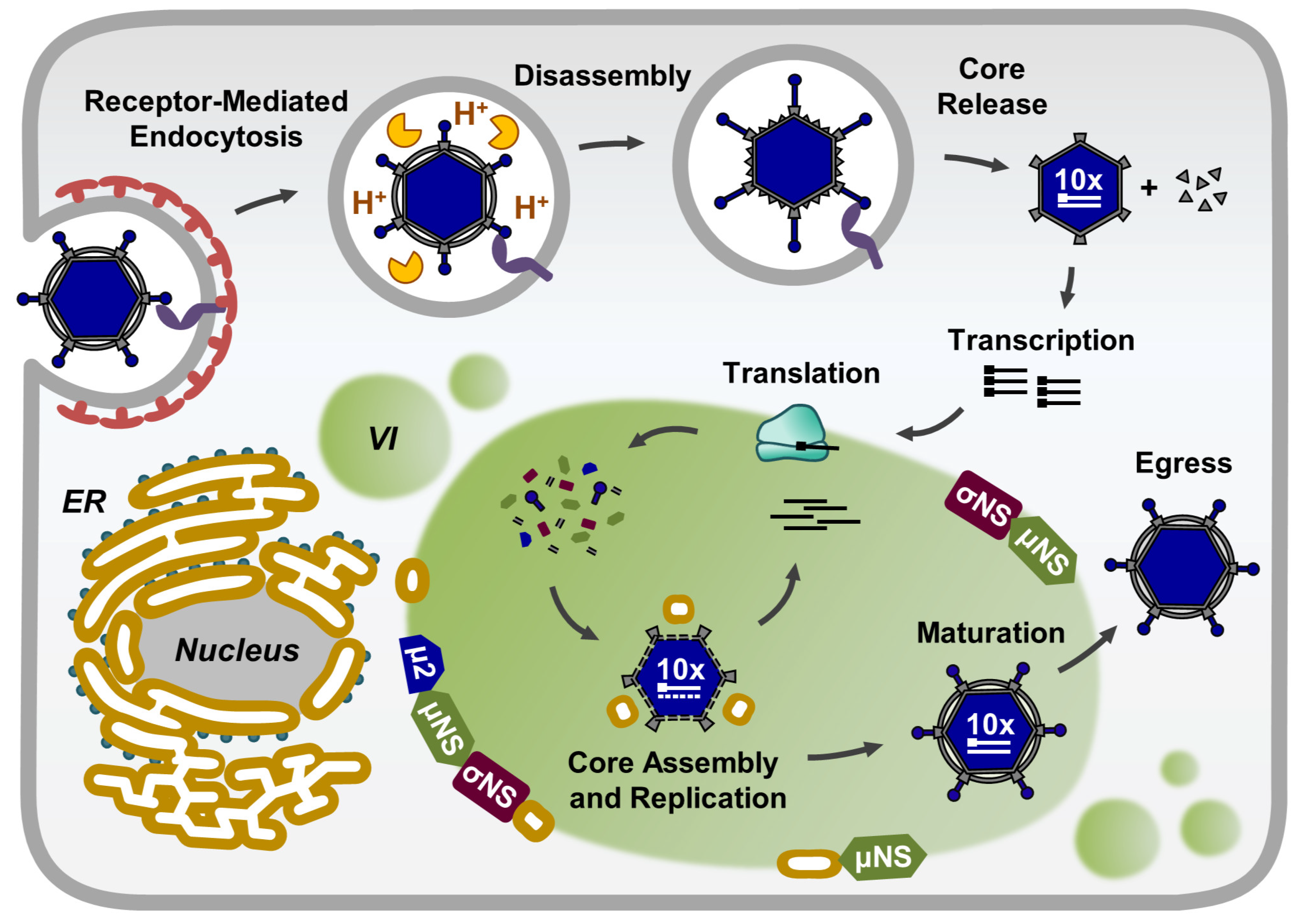
The reovirus replication cycle. VI—viral inclusions; ER—endoplasmic reticulum.

Dermody studies fundamental mechanisms of viral replication to better understand the propagation of viruses and the cause of disease. By understanding how viruses behave, he hopes to find ways to fight them and develop new vaccines. Dermody's lab examines inter-related issues relating to the structures involved in viral attachment and cell entry, mechanisms of genome replication, capsid assembly, and viral release, and the role of viral receptors in disease. He employs genetic screens, biochemical assays, and cell imaging for his studies.

Dermody studies reoviruses, including the genera rotavirus, which causes illness in children. Reovirus is an experimental model for the occurrence of viral encephalitis in infants. An important question is how a virus binds receptors on the cell surface and enters into host cells. As an example of this work, in 2011, Dermody identified the protein kinase Src as a mediator of reovirus cell entry. Inhibition of Src kinase blocked reovirus entry and decreased its infectivity.

In 2017, a collaboration between Bana Jabri and others at the University of Chicago Celiac Disease Center and Dermody's group suggested that reovirus infection triggers the immune system to respond to gluten in a way that later leads to celiac disease.

In 2018, Dermody's group described ways in which a virus can repurpose a host cell's protein-folding machinery to assemble new viruses. The research suggested that reoviruses hijack a specialized protein-folding chaperone protein in cells called TRiC, using it to fold a protein that is part of the outer coat of the virus to enable the virus to exit the cell. Disrupting the TRiC mechanism kept the virus from forming an outer coat and leaving the cell, disrupting the viral replication cycle.

Dermody also studies chikungunya virus, a potentially deadly mosquito-borne infection that is spreading to new areas because of changes in climate.

To complement his research, Dermody is a committed teacher and mentor. As of 2024, he has trained 37 graduate students and 24 postdoctoral fellows (inclusive of current trainees). He has directed NIH-funded training programs for M.D.-Ph.D. students, pediatric postdoctoral fellows, and pediatric junior faculty. He has received awards for teaching and mentoring students, residents, and fellows.

== Awards and honors ==
- 2006, Ernest W. Goodpasture Award, Vanderbilt University, "For Groundbreaking Research that Addresses the Pathogenesis of Disease at the Cellular and/or Molecular Level".
- 2006-2007, Robert D. Collins Award for Excellence in Teaching, Vanderbilt University School of Medicine
- 2007, Fellow, American Association for the Advancement of Science
- 2013, Grant W. Liddle Award, Vanderbuilt University, for "leadership in the promotion of scientific research"
- 2016, David C. White Research and Mentoring Award, American Society for Microbiology (ASM)

== Selected publications ==
- Barton, ES; Forrest, JC; Connolly, JL; Chappell, JD; Liu, Y; Schnell, FJ; Nusrat, A; Parkos, CA; Dermody, TS (February 9, 2001). "Junction adhesion molecule is a receptor for reovirus". Cell. 104 (3): 441–51. doi:10.1016/s0092-8674(01)00231-8. PMID 11239401.
- Huang, IC; Bosch, BJ; Li, F; Li, W; Lee, KH; Ghiran, S; Vasilieva, N; Dermody, TS; Harrison, SC; Dormitzer, PR; Farzan, M; Rottier, PJ; Choe, H (February 10, 2006). "SARS coronavirus, but not human coronavirus NL63, utilizes cathepsin L to infect ACE2-expressing cells". The Journal of Biological Chemistry. 281 (6): 3198–203. doi:10.1074/jbc.M508381200. PMC 8010168. PMID 16339146.
- Laukoetter, MG; Nava, P; Lee, WY; Severson, EA; Capaldo, CT; Babbin, BA; Williams, IR; Koval, M; Peatman, E; Campbell, JA; Dermody, TS; Nusrat, A; Parkos, CA (December 24, 2007). "JAM-A regulates permeability and inflammation in the intestine in vivo". The Journal of Experimental Medicine. 204 (13): 3067–76. doi:10.1084/jem.20071416. PMC 2150975. PMID 18039951.
- Kato, H; Takeuchi, O; Mikamo-Satoh, E; Hirai, R; Kawai, T; Matsushita, K; Hiiragi, A; Dermody, TS; Fujita, T; Akira, S (July 7, 2008). "Length-dependent recognition of double-stranded ribonucleic acids by retinoic acid-inducible gene-I and melanoma differentiation-associated gene 5". The Journal of Experimental Medicine. 205 (7): 1601–10. doi:10.1084/jem.20080091. PMC 2442638. PMID 18591409.
- Kuss, SK; Best, GT; Etheredge, CA; Pruijssers, AJ; Frierson, JM; Hooper, LV; Dermody, TS; Pfeiffer, JK (October 14, 2011). "Intestinal microbiota promote enteric virus replication and systemic pathogenesis". Science. 334 (6053): 249–52. Bibcode:2011Sci...334..249K. doi:10.1126/science.1211057. PMC 3222156. PMID 21998395.
- Mainou, Bernardo A.; Dermody, Terence S. (April 2011). "Src Kinase Mediates Productive Endocytic Sorting of Reovirus during Cell Entry". Journal of Virology. 85 (7): 3203–3213. doi:10.1128/JVI.02056-10. ISSN 0022-538X. PMC 3067878. PMID 21248042.
- Goubau, D; Schlee, M; Deddouche, S; Pruijssers, AJ; Zillinger, T; Goldeck, M; Schuberth, C; Van der Veen, AG; Fujimura, T; Rehwinkel, J; Iskarpatyoti, JA; Barchet, W; Ludwig, J; Dermody, TS; Hartmann, G; Reis e Sousa, C (October 16, 2014). "Antiviral immunity via RIG-I-mediated recognition of RNA bearing 5'-diphosphates". Nature. 514 (7522): 372–375. Bibcode:2014Natur.514..372G. doi:10.1038/nature13590. PMC 4201573. PMID 25119032.
- Bouziat, R; Hinterleitner, R; Brown, JJ; Stencel-Baerenwald, JE; Ikizler, M; Mayassi, T; Meisel, M; Kim, SM; Discepolo, V; Pruijssers, AJ; Ernest, JD; Iskarpatyoti, JA; Costes, LM; Lawrence, I; Palanski, BA; Varma, M; Zurenski, MA; Khomandiak, S; McAllister, N; Aravamudhan, P; Boehme, KW; Hu, F; Samsom, JN; Reinecker, HC; Kupfer, SS; Guandalini, S; Semrad, CE; Abadie, V; Khosla, C; Barreiro, LB; Xavier, RJ; Ng, A; Dermody, TS; Jabri, B (April 7, 2017). "Reovirus infection triggers inflammatory responses to dietary antigens and development of celiac disease". Science. 356 (6333): 44–50. Bibcode:2017Sci...356...44B. doi:10.1126/science.aah5298. PMC 5506690. PMID 28386004.
- Knowlton, Jonathan J.; Fernández de Castro, Isabel; Ashbrook, Alison W.; Gestaut, Daniel R.; Zamora, Paula F.; Bauer, Joshua A.; Forrest, J. Craig; Frydman, Judith; Risco, Cristina; Dermody, Terence S. (April 2018). "The TRiC chaperonin controls reovirus replication through outer-capsid folding". Nature Microbiology. 3 (4): 481–493. doi:10.1038/s41564-018-0122-x. ISSN 2058-5276. PMC 5874176. PMID 29531365.
- Aravamudhan, P; Raghunathan, K; Konopka-Anstadt, J; Pathak, A; Sutherland, DM; Carter, BD; Dermody, TS (February 2020). "Reovirus uses macropinocytosis-mediated entry and fast axonal transport to infect neurons". PLOS Pathogens. 16 (2) e1008380. doi:10.1371/journal.ppat.1008380. PMC 7065821. PMID 32109948.
- Knowlton, JJ; Gestaut, D; Ma, B; Taylor, G; Seven, AB; Leitner, A; Wilson, GJ; Shanker, S; Yates, NA; Prasad, BVV; Aebersold, R; Chiu, W; Frydman, J; Dermody, TS (March 16, 2021). "Structural and functional dissection of reovirus capsid folding and assembly by the prefoldin-TRiC/CCT chaperone network". Proceedings of the National Academy of Sciences of the United States of America. 118 (11) e2018127118. Bibcode:2021PNAS..11818127K. doi:10.1073/pnas.2018127118. PMC 7980406. PMID 33836586.
