= Anna Marie Skalka =

American virologist

- Education: Adelphi University; New York University (Ph.D)
- Awards: William Procter Prize for Scientific Achievement (2018)
- Scientific career
- Fields: Virology, genetics
- Workplaces: Fox Chase Cancer Center; Cold Spring Harbor Laboratory
- Doctoral advisor: Jerard Hurwitz

Anna Marie (Ann) Skalka (née Sturn) is an American virologist, molecular biologist and geneticist who is professor emerita and senior advisor to the president at the Fox Chase Cancer Center. She is a co-author of a textbook on virology, Principles of Virology.

== Early life and education ==
She was born in around 1938 in the Williamsburg neighborhood of Brooklyn, New York City, the first child of immigrants Edward Heinrich Sturn and Arcelia (Celia) Del Valle. She attended Grover Cleveland High School in Ridgewood, Queens. Both parents worked at the nearby Pfizer production plant, and she also took a summer laboratory job at the plant.

She won a scholarship that enabled her to attend Adelphi University, where she majored in biology, graduating in 1959. Initially influenced by the herpetologist Bayard Brattstrom, with whom she co-authored her first two research papers on the salamander Eurycea bislineata, she subsequently became interested in the then-novel disciplines of molecular biology and molecular genetics. She briefly studied under geneticist David M. Bonner at the Yale School of Medicine's Department of Microbiology, with a National Science Foundation fellowship. In 1960, she transferred to the microbiology department of New York University (NYU) Medical School, supervised initially by the bacterial geneticist Werner Maas and then by the biochemist Jerard Hurwitz, who was researching nucleic acids. She received her Ph.D. from NYU in 1964; her thesis was on histones.

== Career and research ==
Skalka joined the Phage group at the Cold Spring Harbor Laboratory in 1964 to carry out postdoctoral work on the DNA bacteriophage lambda in the laboratory of the Nobel laureate geneticist and bacteriologist, Alfred Hershey. She researched transcriptional regulation in phage lambda with Phyllis Bear and others, as well as DNA genome replication in the phage with Mervyn G. Smith and others.

In 1968, after Hershey retired and the unit closed, Skalka joined the newly founded Roche Institute of Molecular Biology, at Nutley, New Jersey, where she remained until 1987. At first she continued her work on the replication of phage lambda with Lynn W. Enquist, Paul Bartl, Jose Sogo and others.

In the mid-1970s, she switched her research focus to retroviruses, after a sabbatical studying with Hidesaburo Hanafusa. Her initial focus used the avian sarcoma leukosis viruses (ASV) of chickens as a model system. With Bill McClements and others, she cloned ribosomal RNA genes of the chicken host. In the early 1980s, Skalka's laboratory cloned unintegrated ASV and studied transcriptional regulatory elements in the viral long terminal repeats (LTRs). With collaborator Susan Astrin at the Fox Chase Cancer Center, the laboratory cloned part of the avian endogenous provirus ev-1 as well as its integration site; the results suggested similarities between retroviruses and transposable elements.

Skalka later joined the Fox Chase Cancer Center, where she continued to study the molecular aspects of retroviral replication. She held the W. W. Smith Chair in Cancer Research and also served as senior vice president for basic science and director of the Institute for Cancer Research at Fox Chase.

Skalka has authored 240 research publications and edited a number of books in addition to authoring or co-authoring two books.

== Awards ==
She was awarded Sigma Xi's 2018 William Procter Prize, a scientific research award endowed in the name of a former Sigma Xi member William Cooper Procter, the grandson and heir of one of the founders of the Procter and Gamble Company. The citation is for "her contributions to our understanding of the biochemical mechanisms by which retroviruses (including the AIDS virus) replicate and insert their genetic material into the host genome."

She was elected to the American Academy of Arts and Sciences in 1994.

== Personal life ==
In 1960 she married Rudolph (Rudy) Skalka, who passed away in 2022. They have two children, a daughter and a son.
