= Virokine =

Virokines are proteins encoded by some large DNA viruses that are secreted by the host cell and serve to evade the host's immune system. Such proteins are referred to as virokines if they resemble cytokines, growth factors, or complement regulators; the term viroceptor is sometimes used if the proteins resemble cellular receptors. A third class of virally encoded immunomodulatory proteins consists of proteins that bind directly to cytokines. Due to the immunomodulatory properties of these proteins, they have been proposed as potentially therapeutically relevant to autoimmune diseases.

== Mechanism ==
The primary mechanism of virokine interference with immune signaling is thought to be competitive inhibition of the binding of host signaling molecules to their target receptors. Virokines occupy binding sites on host receptors, thereby inhibiting access by signaling molecules. Viroceptors mimic host receptors and thus divert signaling molecules from finding their targets. Cytokine-binding proteins bind to and sequester cytokines, occluding the binding surface through which they interact with receptors. The effect is to attenuate and subvert host immune response.

== Discovery ==
The term "virokine" was coined by National Institutes of Health virologist Bernard Moss. The early 1990s saw several reports of virally encoded proteins with sequence homology to immune proteins, followed by reports of the cowpox and vaccinia viruses directly interfering with key immune regulator IL1B. The first identified virokine was an epidermal growth factor-like protein found in myxoma viruses.

Much of the early work on virokines involved vaccinia virus, which was discovered to secrete proteins that promote proliferation of neighboring cells and block complement immune activity leading to inflammation.

== Evolutionary origins ==
The immunomodulatory proteins, including virokines, in the poxvirus family have been extensively studied in the context of the evolution of the family. Virokines in this family are thought to have been acquired from host genes and from other viruses through horizontal gene transfer. Similar observations have been made in the herpesvirus family; for example, Epstein-Barr virus encodes an interleukin protein with high sequence identity to the human interleukin-10, suggesting a recent evolutionary origin.
