= Peter Meyer (astrophysicist) =

Peter Meyer (January 6, 1920 – March 7, 2002) was a German-born American astrophysicist notable for his research of cosmic rays. Meyer was director of the Enrico Fermi Institute at the University of Chicago, was a chairman of the University of Chicago's physics department, and a member of the National Academy of Sciences. He was also chair of the Cosmic Ray Physics Division of the American Physical Society, a member of the Space Science Board of the National Academy of Sciences, and chair of the Committee on Astronomy and Astrophysics of the Space Science Board.

== Biography ==
Meyer was born in Berlin, Germany, in a Jewish family. He studied at the Technical University in Berlin, where he received Diplom Ingenieur (1942), with a thesis on proportional counters. He was not permitted to study on a PhD level in Germany as a Jew, and worked in a factory during the war. He received a doctorate from the University of Göttingen in 1948, with Wolfgang Paul and Hans Kopfermann as advisers. He then had a postdoc position in the Cavendish Laboratory, and then worked as a researcher in the Max Planck Institute for Physics at Göttingen.

He immigrated to the United States in 1953 and joined the faculty of the University of Chicago, where he worked with John A. Simpson. Meyer advanced to assistant professor in 1956, associate professor in 1962 and professor in 1966. He was the Director of the Enrico Fermi Institute from 1978 to 1983. Meyer spent the rest of his career at the University of Chicago and became emeritus in 1990. He received the Quantrell Award.

Meyer experimented with balloon-borne cosmic ray detectors; together with Simpson he built one of the first instruments for cosmic ray experiments flown on spacecraft.

Meyer was "an accomplished cellist", who often played with his first wife. He was married twice, to physicist Luise Meyer-Schützmeister (d. 1981), and to virologist Patricia G. Spear. He had two sons.

Meyer died in Chicago from complications of a stroke. His doctoral students include Rochus E. Vogt.
