= Virology (journal) =

- Discipline: Virology
- Language: English
- Edited by: Michael Emerman

Publication details
- History: 1955–present
- Publisher: Elsevier
- Frequency: Biweekly
- Open access: Delayed, after 12 months; hybrid
- Impact factor: 3.616 (2020)

Standard abbreviations
- ISO 4: Virology

Indexing
- CODEN: VIRLAX
- ISSN: 0042-6822 (print); 1096-0341 (web)
- LCCN: a57005753
- OCLC no.: 231794724

Links
- Journal homepage; Online access

Virology is a peer-reviewed scientific journal in virology. Established in 1955 by George Hirst, Lindsay Black and Salvador Luria, it is the earliest English-only journal to specialize in the field. The journal covers basic research into viruses affecting animals, plants, bacteria and fungi, including their molecular biology, structure, assembly, pathogenesis, immunity, interactions with the host cell, evolution and ecology. Molecular aspects of control and prevention are also covered, as well as viral vectors and gene therapy, but clinical virology is excluded. As of 2013, the journal is published fortnightly by Elsevier.

== History ==
The field of virology began in the 1890s, with the discovery of infectious agents small enough to pass through filters sufficiently fine to catch bacteria. The first specialist journal in the field, Archiv für die gesamte Virusforschung, appeared in 1939. Published by Springer-Verlag out of its Vienna office, its papers were in a mixture of languages, mainly German, French and English, and as the Second World War continued, publication became erratic. Most research continued to be published in non-specialist scientific and medical journals, with the research communities studying the viruses of animals, plants and bacteria remaining separated from one another.

George Hirst, Lindsay Black and Salvador Luria saw the need for a journal that united basic science research across all viruses, regardless of their host species. They established Virology in 1955, and the journal first appeared in May of that year. It was the first English-only journal to focus on virology, and is the oldest United States-based journal in the specialism. Hirst was the founding editor-in-chief, with Black and Luria being co-editors. Between them, they covered the major disciplines of viruses infecting animals (Hirst), plants (Black) and bacteria (Luria).

Unlike several other long-established general journals in the field, such as the Journal of Virology from the American Society for Microbiology and the Society for General Microbiology's Journal of General Virology (which both first appeared in 1967), Virology is a commercial journal which has never been associated with an academic society. It was originally published by Academic Press, and then under the Academic Press imprints of purchasers Harcourt, Brace & World and Elsevier.

However, since 1 October 2020, it was declared as the official journal of the World Society for Virology

The journal was soon successful. Robert Wagner, founding editor of the Journal of Virology, describes Virology in the mid-1960s as "the well-established Academic Press journal Virology, which had an excellent reputation and to which many virus researchers, including myself, submitted their very best papers." Seven issues in two volumes were published in the initial year, with a total of 538 pages. In 1959, the frequency increased to monthly, with three annual volumes, and the journal had nearly quadrupled in size by its sixth year. The frequency increased to 14 issues per year in 1976, returning to monthly in 1987, and then increasing again over 1994–95 to reach twice monthly in 1996.

The first issue contained a broad mix of research including papers on bacteriophages, the plant viruses, tobacco mosaic and potato virus X, and the animal viruses, influenza, Rift Valley fever and poliovirus. Authors included Renato Dulbecco, Alfred Hershey, Raymond Latarjet, André Michel Lwoff and Marguerite Vogt, among others. The journal had an international authorship from the start, with authors from the United States and France, two major centres of phage research at that date, as well as Japan. The early content was biased towards virus structure and replication, which made up two-thirds of the content in the mid-1960s, but have gradually been replaced by research into pathogenesis, immunity and interactions with the host cell, which made up more than two-thirds of the journal in 1999. The early journal was particularly known for publishing research into plant viruses. Wagner writes "our competitor, Virology, had emphasized plant viruses to such a degree that this area had become a paramount part of their publishing effort and most plant virologists looked upon Virology as their journal." This focus changed over time, and by 1999, animal viruses were the subject of over 88% of the journal's content.

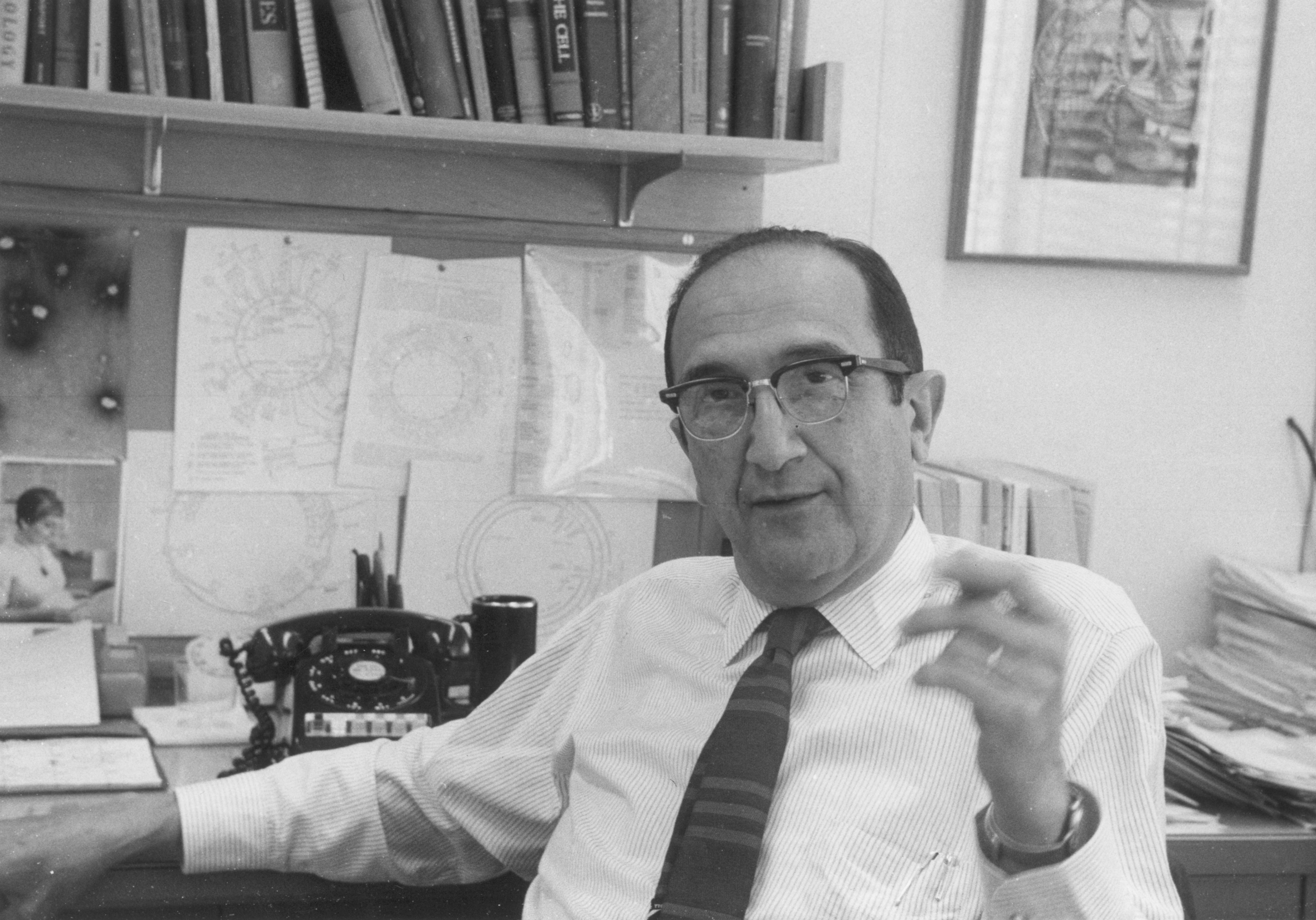
Salvador Luria, one of Virology's founders

Hirst served as editor-in-chief for 21 years until 1975, and his influence on the journal was enormous. When he retired, his co-editors wrote that "he has defined the journal's objectives and established its style." Hirst has had only three successors: Wolfgang Joklik served for 18 years (1975–1994) and was succeeded by Robert A. Lamb (1994–2012). Michael Emerman (Fred Hutchinson Cancer Research Center, Seattle, USA), took over in January 2013 until January 2019 when he was replaced by Richard Kuhn of Purdue University . Of Hirst's co-founders, Luria, the well-known phage researcher, remained a co-editor for 18 years; Black was the plant virus editor until 1965. Another well-known co-editor was Arnold J. Levine (1975–1984), who left Virology to become editor-in-chief of the Journal of Virology.

== Modern journal ==
Papers are accepted on all viruses, irrespective of host species, but the modern journal's primary focus is on animal viruses. The journal content is divided by topic, rather than by type of virus. The journal publishes occasional special issues, including reviews-only issues in 2011 and 2013. From January 2013, recent content is available freely online after 12 months, with immediate free access to reviews and special issues. Virology also participates in a hybrid open-access scheme, so that authors can pay for articles to be available online without delay.

== Abstracting and indexing ==
Virology has a 2020 impact factor of 3.616, according to Journal Citation Reports. The journal is abstracted and indexed in:

- BIOSIS
- Biological Abstracts
- Chemical Abstracts
- Current Contents/Mife Sciences
- Current Contents/Clinical Medicine
- EMBASE/Excerpta Medica
- Genetics Abstracts
- Immunology Abstracts
- MEDLINE/Index Medicus
- Science Citation Index
- Scopus
- Tropical Diseases Bulletin
- CSA Virology and AIDS Abstracts
