= Luise Meyer-Schützmeister =

German physicist

- Born: 1915; Germany
- Died: 1981 (aged 65–66)
- Education: Technische Universität Berlin
- Known for: Measurement of gamma rays produced in nuclear reactions
- Awards: Fellow, American Physical Society
- Scientific career
- Fields: Physicist
- Workplaces: Argonne National Laboratory

Luise Meyer-Schützmeister (1915 in Germany – 1981) was a senior physicist at the Argonne National Laboratory, where she was involved in the measurement of gamma rays produced in nuclear reactions, and also conducted studies on the behavior of atomic nuclei. She received her Ph.D at the Technische Hochschule in Charlottenburg (now Technische Universität Berlin) during World War II. In the 1950s, she and her husband, fellow physicist Peter Meyer, emigrated to the United States. There, she became a research associate for the Institute for Nuclear Studies at the University of Chicago. Meyer-Schützmeister became an associate scientist at the Argonne National Laboratory in 1956; later, in 1973, she was promoted to the position of senior scientist, the title she held until her death in 1981.

The Luise Meyer-Schutzmeister Award was named after her, and was created by the Association for Women in Science for women graduate students in physics.

== Select publications ==
- Lee Jr., L. L.; L. Meyer-Schutzmeister; J. P. Schiffer; D. Vincent (1959). "Nuclear Resonance Absorption of Gamma Rays at Low Temperatures". Physical Review Letters. 3 (5): 223–225. Bibcode:1959PhRvL...3..223L. doi:10.1103/PhysRevLett.3.223.
- R.G., Allas; Hanna, S. S.; Meyer-Schützmeister, L.; Segel, R. E.; Singh, P. P.; Vager, Z. (1964). "Evidence for a Single Dominant State for the E1 Giant Resonance". Physical Review Letters. 13 (21): 628–631. Bibcode:1964PhRvL..13..628A. doi:10.1103/PhysRevLett.13.628.
