= Hemopoietic growth factor =

Class of proteins

Hemopoietic growth factors regulate the differentiation and proliferation of particular progenitor cells. Made available through recombinant DNA technology, they hold tremendous potential for medical uses when a person's natural ability to form blood cells is diminished or defective. Recombinant erythropoietin (EPO) is very effective in treating the diminished red blood cell production that accompanies end-stage kidney disease. Erythropoietin is a sialoglycoprotein hormone produced by peritubular cells of kidney.

Granulocyte-macrophage colony-stimulating factor and granulocyte CSF are given to stimulate white blood cell formation in cancer patients who are receiving chemotherapy, which tends to kill their red bone marrow cells as well as the cancer cells. Thrombopoietin shows great promise for preventing platelet depletion during chemotherapy. CSFs and thrombopoietin also improve the outcome of patients who receive bone marrow transplants.

== Types ==
- Erythropoietin is a glycoprotein hormone secreted by the interstitial fibroblast cells of the kidneys in response to low oxygen levels. It prompts the production of erythrocytes.
- Thrombopoietin, another glycoprotein hormone, is produced by the liver and kidneys. It triggers the development of megakaryocytes into platelets.
- Cytokines are glycoproteins secreted by a wide variety of cells, including red bone marrow, leukocytes, macrophages, fibroblasts, and endothelial cells. They act locally as autocrine or paracrine factors, stimulating the proliferation of progenitor cells and helping to stimulate both nonspecific and specific resistance to disease. There are two major subtypes of cytokines known as colony-stimulating factors and interleukins.
  - Colony-stimulating factors are glycoproteins that act locally, as autocrine or paracrine factors. Some trigger the differentiation of myeloblasts into granular leukocytes, namely, neutrophils, eosinophils, and basophils. These are referred to as granulocyte CSFs. A different CSF induces the production of monocytes, called monocyte CSFs. Both granulocytes and monocytes are stimulated by GM-CSF; granulocytes, monocytes, platelets, and erythrocytes are stimulated by multi-CSF.
  - Interleukins are another class of cytokine signaling molecules important in hemopoiesis. They were initially thought to be secreted uniquely by leukocytes and to communicate only with other leukocytes, and were named accordingly, but are now known to be produced by a variety of cells including bone marrow and endothelium. Researchers now suspect that interleukins may play other roles in body functioning, including differentiation and maturation of cells, producing immunity and inflammation. To date, more than a dozen interleukins have been identified, with others likely to follow. They are generally numbered IL-1, IL-2, IL-3, etc.

== Clinical implications ==
- Some athletes use synthetic erythropoetin as a performance-enhancing drug to increase RBC counts and subsequently increase oxygen delivery to tissues throughout the body. Erythropoietin is a banned substance in most organized sports, but it is also used medically in the treatment of certain anemia, specifically those triggered by certain types of cancer, and other disorders in which increased erythrocyte counts and oxygen levels are desirable.
- Synthetic forms of colony stimulating factors are often administered to patients with various forms of cancer who are receiving chemotherapy to revive their WBC counts.
