= Carolina Barillas-Mury =

Microbiologist

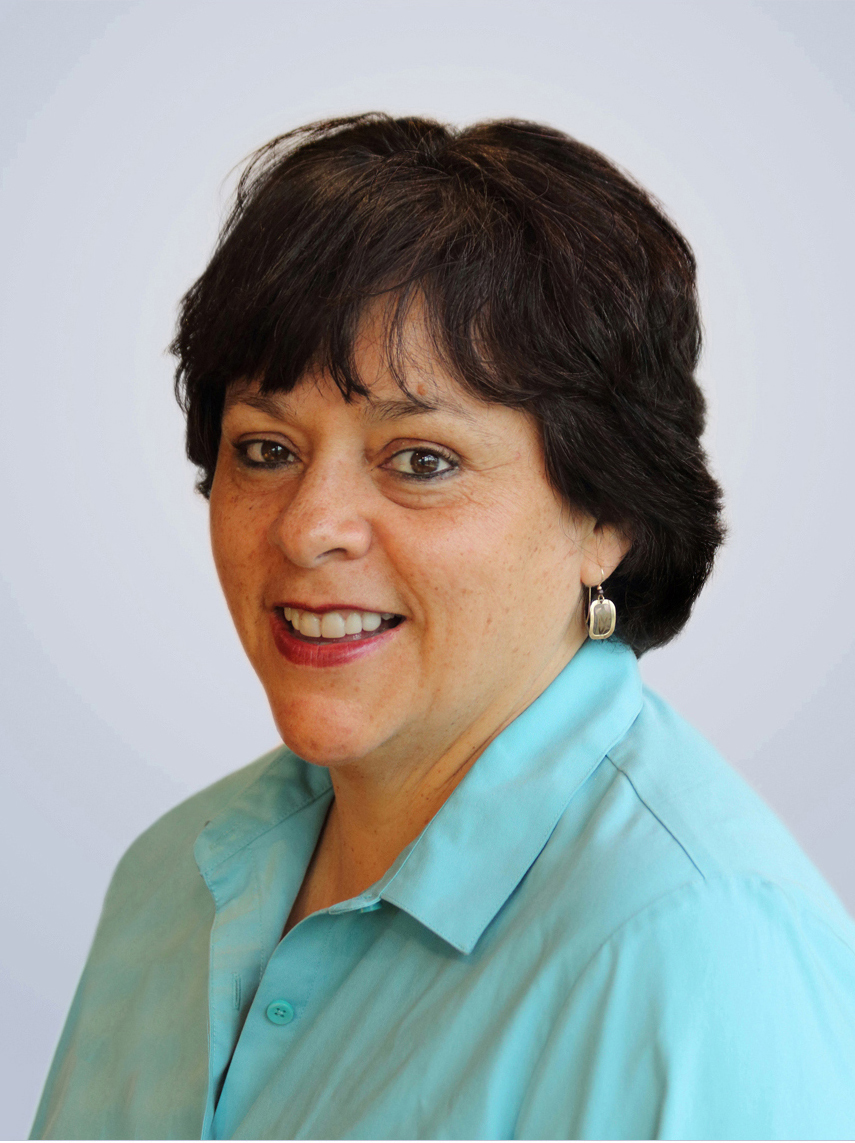
- Born: Guatemala City, Guatemala
- Citizenship: Guatemalan, American, Swiss
- Education: B. S. Universidad del Valle de Guatemala; M.D. Universidad Francisco Marroquín de Guatemala; Ph.D. University of Arizona; Post-Doctoral Harvard University; Post-Doctoral European Molecular Biology Laboratory
- Alma mater: Universidad del Valle de Guatemala; Universidad Francisco Marroquín de Guatemala; University of Arizona
- Children: Zoe Johnson Barillas
- Awards: Sanofi-Institute Pasteur Award; Bailey K. Ashford Medal, American Society of Tropical Medicine and Hygiene
- Scientific career
- Workplaces: European Molecular Biology Laboratory; Colorado State University; National Institutes of Health

Carolina Barillas-Mury is the chair of the Mosquito Immunity and Vector Competence Section and Director of the Malaria Research Program at the National Institute of Allergy and Infectious Diseases of the National Institutes of Health. She studies how mosquitos transmit diseases like malaria, and in recognition of her research, she has been elected to the National Academy of Sciences.

== Early life and education ==
Barillas-Mury was born in 1961 in Guatemala. She learned English when she attended high school run by American nuns.

Barillas-Mury graduated from the Universidad del Valle de Guatemala in 1981 with a B.S. in biology. She received her M.D. from Universidad Francisco Marroquín de Guatemala in 1985. There were no graduate programs in Guatemala, so in 1987, she moved to the United States to do a PhD at the University of Arizona in the lab of Michael Wells, where she studied the process of enzymatic blood digestion by Aedes aegypti. She graduated in 1992 and stayed until 1993 to do postdoctoral research. In 1994, she joined the lab of Fotis Kafatos at Harvard University. She then moved to Germany to do research at the European Molecular Biology Laboratory.

== Career ==
Barillas-Mury was hired as an assistant professor at Colorado State University’s department of microbiology, immunology, and pathology in 1998. There, she began working to develop a model of cellular invasion of parasites. She moved to the National Institutes of Health in 2003. In 2010, she was promoted to senior investigator, and by 2016 she was named an NIH Distinguished Investigator.

She is the head of the Mosquito Immunity and Vector Competence Section at the National Institute of Allergy and Infectious Diseases. There, she studies how Plasmodium parasites interact with the mosquito immune system, and how this affects the transmission of malaria.

She is an editor of the Proceedings of the National Academy of Sciences.

== Awards and honors ==
- 2010 Bailey K. Ashford Medal of the American Society of Tropical Medicine and Hygiene
- 2013 Sanofi/Pasteur Award in Tropical and Neglected Diseases
- 2014 elected member of the National Academy of Sciences
- 2021 elected member of the National Academy of Medicine
