= Carol Kumamoto =

American microbiologist

Carol A. Kumamoto
- Education: University of California, Los Angeles (BS, PhD)
- Scientific career
- Workplaces: Stanford University; Harvard Medical School; Tufts University

Carol Kumamoto is an American microbiologist who is Professor of Molecular Biology & Microbiology at Tufts University. She investigates the filamentous growth of Candida albicans, a fungal pathogen that causes several diseases. She is also interested in how C. albicans interacts with its host during colonisation and invasive diseases. She is a Fellow of the American Association for the Advancement of Science and the American Academy of Microbiology.

== Early life and education ==
Kumamoto studied biology at the University of California, Los Angeles (UCLA), graduating in 1976. She remained there for her doctoral degree before moving to Harvard Medical School for a postdoctoral research position in 1980. She joined Stanford University as a research associate and joined Tufts University in 1986. Her early work examined the translocation of proteins across E. coli's inner-membrane. She studied the mutant strains of E. coli that were defective in exporting the periplasmatic protein maltose binding protein into the periplasm from the cytoplasm. She showed that these mutants were defective in the gene SecB and went on to study the mechanism of action of this protein; showing that it had chaperone activity and was selective in its binding to exported protein precursors.

== Research and career ==
Kumamoto is a Professor of Molecular Biology & Microbiology at Tufts University. Her research considers Candida albicans (C. albicans), a fungal pathogen that can causes several diseases. C. albicans typically colonises the gastrointestinal tract of humans without causing any problems, but when the host organism becomes immunocompromised the pathogen produces invasive lesions that are associated with candidiasis. Candidiasis is complicated to diagnose and can be fatal. Kumamoto demonstrated that low levels of the protein Efg1p permit fast growth of C. albicans, whereas high levels suppress the growth.

In particular, Kumamoto studies the environmental conditions that cause C. albicans to grow in filamentous, elongated cells, which are able to invade and destroy biological tissue and enter the bloodstream. Early in her career, Kumamoto demonstrated that this filamentous growth occurs when the organism is grown in contact with an agar medium. She showed that the CZF1 gene is a regulator of the filamentation response, and that Mkc1 and Cek1 (MAP kinases) are activated when cells are grown in contact with the agar. She has demonstrated that certain dietary fats, including coconut oil, can suppress the growth of C. albicans in the gut, decreasing the risk of fungal infections. It has been proposed that this finding will decrease the need for antifungal drugs and could be used to decrease the amount of C. albicans in the guts of premature infants. In 2019, Kumamoto reported the first results of a clinical trial that involved supplementing the diets of preterm infants with medium-chain triglycerides to reduce the amount of C. albicans in the gastrointestinal tract.

Kumamoto has also studied candida auris a fungus that was identified in 2009 that appears to withstand anti-fungal drugs. She is interested in the mechanism by which C. albicans interacts with its host during colonisation and invasive degrees. For example, Kumamoto has demonstrated that the interaction of C. albicans with other pathogens can influence its virulence.

== Awards and honours ==
- 2014 Fellow of the American Association for the Advancement of Science
- 2019 Fellow of the American Academy of Microbiology

== Selected publications ==
- Kumamoto, Carol A. (2002). "Candida biofilms". Current Opinion in Microbiology. 5 (6): 608–611. doi:10.1016/S1369-5274(02)00371-5. PMID 12457706.
- Kumamoto, Carol A. (2006). "Candida albicans Biofilms Produce Antifungal-Tolerant Persister Cells". Antimicrobial Agents and Chemotherapy. 50 (11): 3839–3846. doi:10.1128/AAC.00684-06. PMC 1635216. PMID 16923951.
- Kumamoto, Carol A. (2005). "Contributions of hyphae and hypha‐co‐regulated genes to Candida albicans virulence". Cellular Microbiology. 7 (11): 1546–1554. doi:10.1111/j.1462-5822.2005.00616.x. PMID 16207242. S2CID 22740748.

Kumamoto has written for The Conversation.
