= Samuel G. Wildman =

American biologist (1912–2004)

- Born: Samuel Gordon Wildman; May 26, 1912
- Died: August 16, 2004 (aged 92)
- Scientific career
- Fields: Biology
- Institutions: University of California, Los Angeles

Samuel Goodnow Wildman (May 26, 1912 – August 16, 2004) was an American biologist. Wildman joined the University of California, Los Angeles, as a professor of biology in 1950 and retired in 1979. Professor Wildman is best known for his leading work over several decades on "Fraction I protein" (now known as RuBisCO) although his record of publications spanned more than 60 years in total. In 1979, the American Society of Plant Physiologists awarded him with the Charles Barnes Life Membership Award, placing him in company with notables such as Erwin Bünning.
