= Cytokine =

Category of small signaling proteins

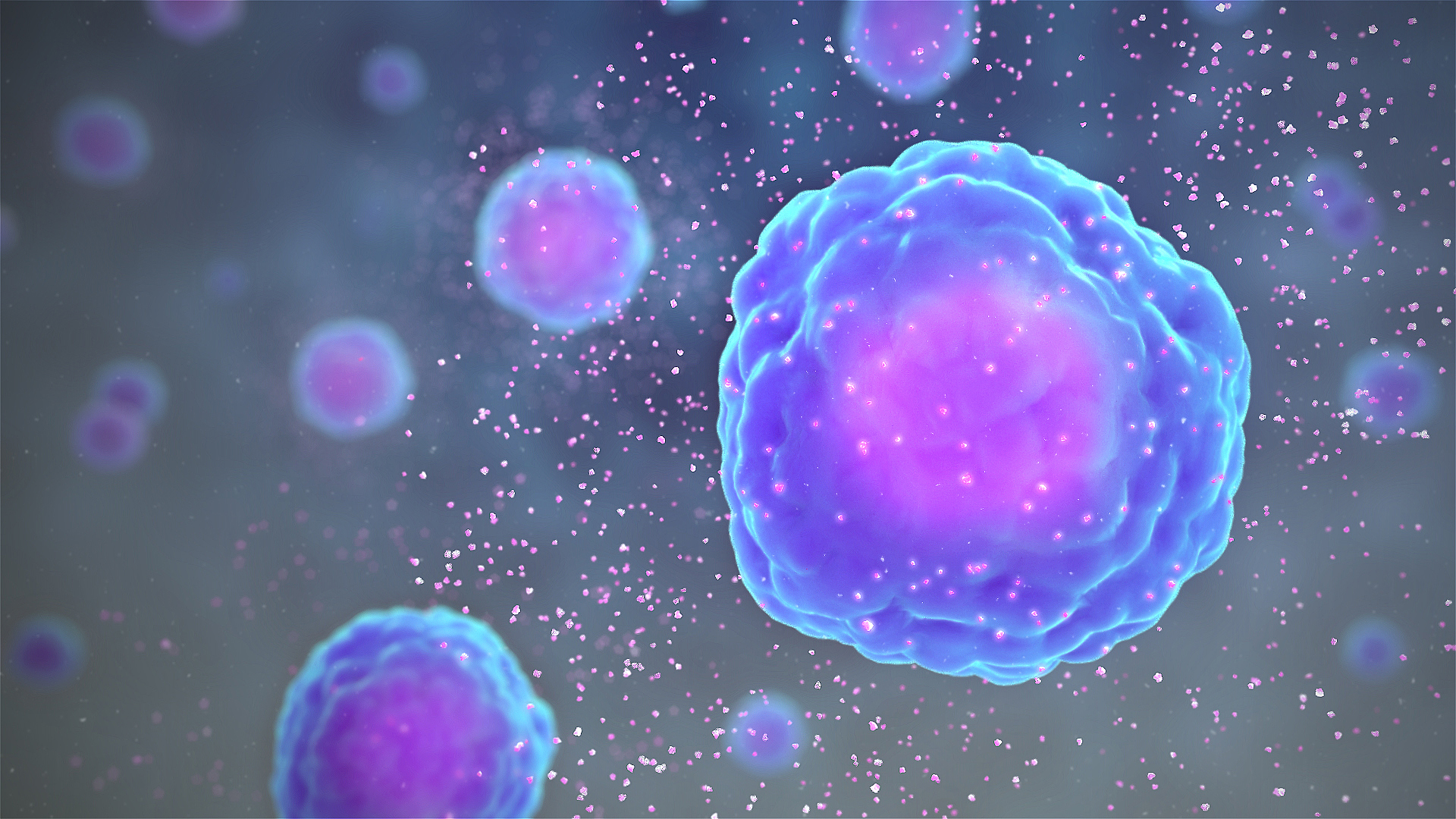
Cytokines (small pink particles) being secreted in a medical animation

In cell biology, cytokines (/ˈsaɪtəkaɪn/) are a broad and loose category of small proteins (~5–25 kDa) important in cell signaling. Cytokines are produced by a broad range of cells, including immune cells, as well as endothelial cells, fibroblasts, and various types of connective tissue cells. A single cytokine may be produced by more than one type of cell.

Cytokines are usually too large to cross cell membranes and enter cells. They typically function by interacting with specific cytokine receptors on the surface of target cells. Cytokines include chemokines, interferons, interleukins, lymphokines, and tumour necrosis factors, but generally not hormones or growth factors (despite some overlap in the terminology).

Cytokines are essential for the functioning of immune systems, including in immune responses and inflammation. Cytokines modulate the balance between humoral and cell-based immune responses, and they regulate the maturation, growth, and responsiveness of particular cell populations. Some cytokines enhance or inhibit the action of other cytokines in complex ways. Cytokines are generally released in lower concentrations than hormones. Immune cytokines released by one cell can send signals to the same cell (autocrine signaling), nearby cells (paracrine signaling), and other cells throughout the body (endocrine signaling).

== Etymology and nomenclature ==
The word comes from the ancient Greek language: cyto, from Greek κύτος, kytos, 'cavity, cell' + kines, from Greek κίνησις, kinēsis, 'movement'.

Cytokines have been classed as lymphokines, interleukins, and chemokines, based on their presumed cell of secretion, function, or target of action. Because cytokines are characterised by considerable redundancy and pleiotropism, such distinctions, allowing for exceptions, are obsolete.

- The term interleukin was initially used by researchers for those cytokines whose presumed targets are principally white blood cells (leukocytes). It is now used largely for designation of newer cytokine molecules and bears little relation to their presumed function. The vast majority of these are produced by T-helper cells.
- Lymphokines: produced by lymphocytes
- Monokines: produced exclusively by monocytes
- Interferons: involved in antiviral responses
- Colony stimulating factors: support the growth of cells in semisolid media
- Chemokines: mediate chemoattraction (chemotaxis) between cells.

== Classification ==
=== Structural ===
Structural homogeneity has been able to partially distinguish between cytokines that do not demonstrate a considerable degree of redundancy so that they can be classified into four types:

- The four-α-helix bundle family (InterPro: IPR009079): member cytokines have three-dimensional structures with a bundle of four α-helices. This family, in turn, is divided into three sub-families:
1. the IL-2 subfamily. This is the largest family. It contains several non-immunological cytokines including erythropoietin (EPO) and thrombopoietin (TPO). They can be grouped into long-chain and short-chain cytokines by topology. Some members share the common gamma chain as part of their receptor.
2. the interferon (IFN) subfamily.
3. the IL-10 subfamily.
- The IL-1 family, which primarily includes IL-1 and IL-18.
- The cysteine knot cytokines (IPR029034) include members of the transforming growth factor beta superfamily, including TGF-β1, TGF-β2 and TGF-β3.
- The IL-17 family, which has yet to be completely characterized, though member cytokines have a specific effect in promoting proliferation of T-cells that have cytotoxic effects.

=== Functional ===
A classification that proves more useful in clinical and experimental practice outside of structural biology divides immunological cytokines into those that enhance cellular immune responses, type 1 (TNF, IFN-γ, etc.), and those that enhance antibody responses, type 2 (TGF-β, IL-4, IL-10, IL-13, etc.).

A key focus of interest has been that cytokines in one of these two sub-sets tend to inhibit the effects of those in the other. Dysregulation of this tendency is under intensive study for its possible role in the pathogenesis of autoimmune disorders.

Several inflammatory cytokines are induced by oxidative stress.

The fact that cytokines themselves trigger the release of other cytokines and lead to increased oxidative stress makes them important in chronic inflammation, as well as other immunoresponses, such as fever and acute phase proteins of the liver (IL-1,6,12, IFN-a).

Cytokines also play a role in anti-inflammatory pathways and are a possible therapeutic treatment for pathological pain from inflammation or peripheral nerve injury. There are both pro-inflammatory and anti-inflammatory cytokines that regulate this pathway.

== Difference from hormones ==
Classic hormones circulate in aqueous solution in nanomolar (10^{-9} M) concentrations that usually vary by less than one order of magnitude. In contrast, some cytokines (such as IL-6) circulate in picomolar (10^{-12} M) concentrations that can increase up to 1,000 times during trauma or infection. The widespread distribution of cellular sources for cytokines may be a feature that differentiates them from hormones. Virtually all nucleated cells, but especially endo/epithelial cells and resident macrophages (many near the interface with the external environment) are potent producers of IL-1, IL-6, and TNF. In contrast, classic hormones, such as insulin, are secreted from discrete glands such as the pancreas. The current terminology refers to cytokines as immunomodulating agents.

A contributing factor to the difficulty of distinguishing cytokines from hormones is that some immunomodulating effects of cytokines are systemic (i.e., affecting the whole organism) rather than local. For instance, to accurately utilize hormone terminology, cytokines may be autocrine or paracrine in nature, and chemotaxis, chemokinesis and endocrine as a pyrogen. Essentially, cytokines are not limited to their immunomodulatory status as molecules.

Cytokines typically activate second messenger systems, like JAK-STAT pathways, as illustrated on the left side of the diagram. Conversely, hormones typically activate different signaling pathways, like G protein-coupled receptors, seen at the top of the figure.

== Receptors ==
In recent years, the cytokine receptors have come to demand the attention of more investigators than cytokines themselves, partly because of their remarkable characteristics and partly because a deficiency of cytokine receptors has now been directly linked to certain debilitating immunodeficiency states. In this regard, and also because the redundancy and pleomorphism of cytokines are, in fact, a consequence of their homologous receptors, many authorities think that a classification of cytokine receptors would be more clinically and experimentally useful.

A classification of cytokine receptors based on their three-dimensional structure has, therefore, been attempted. Such a classification, though seemingly cumbersome, provides several unique perspectives for attractive pharmacotherapeutic targets.

- Immunoglobulin (Ig) superfamily, which are ubiquitously present throughout several cells and tissues of the vertebrate body, and share structural homology with immunoglobulins (antibodies), cell adhesion molecules, and even some cytokines. Examples: IL-1 receptor types.
- Hemopoietic Growth Factor (type 1) family, whose members have certain conserved motifs in their extracellular amino-acid domain. The IL-2 receptor belongs to this chain, whose γ-chain (common to several other cytokines) deficiency is directly responsible for the x-linked form of Severe Combined Immunodeficiency (X-SCID).
- Interferon (type 2) family, whose members are receptors for IFN β and γ.
- Tumor necrosis factors (TNF) (type 3) family, whose members share a cysteine-rich common extracellular binding domain, and includes several other non-cytokine ligands like CD40, CD27 and CD30, besides the ligands on which the family is named.
- Seven transmembrane helix family, the ubiquitous receptor type of the animal kingdom. All G protein-coupled receptors (for hormones and neurotransmitters) belong to this family. Chemokine receptors, two of which act as binding proteins for HIV (CD4 and CCR5), also belong to this family.
- Interleukin-17 receptor (IL-17R) family, which shows little homology with any other cytokine receptor family. Structural motifs conserved between members of this family include: an extracellular fibronectin III-like domain, a transmembrane domain and a cytoplasmic SERIF domain. The known members of this family are as follows: IL-17RA, IL-17RB, IL-17RC, IL17RD and IL-17RE.

== Cellular effects ==
Each cytokine has a matching cell-surface receptor. Subsequent cascades of intracellular signaling then alter cell functions. This may include the upregulation and/or downregulation of several genes and their transcription factors, resulting in the production of other cytokines, an increase in the number of surface receptors for other molecules, or the suppression of their own effect by feedback inhibition. The effect of a particular cytokine on a given cell depends on the cytokine, its extracellular abundance, the presence and abundance of the complementary receptor on the cell surface, and downstream signals activated by receptor binding; these last two factors can vary by cell type. Cytokines are characterized by considerable redundancy, in that many cytokines appear to share similar functions. It seems to be a paradox that cytokines binding to antibodies have a stronger immune effect than the cytokine alone. This may lead to lower therapeutic doses.

It has been shown that inflammatory cytokines cause an IL-10-dependent inhibition of T-cell expansion and function by up-regulating PD-1 levels on monocytes, which leads to IL-10 production by monocytes after binding of PD-1 by PD-L. Adverse reactions to cytokines are characterized by local inflammation and/or ulceration at the injection sites. Occasionally such reactions are seen with more widespread papular eruptions.

== Functions in health and disease ==
=== Infections and other immune responses ===
Cytokines are crucial for fighting off infections and in other immune responses. However, they can become dysregulated and pathological in inflammation, trauma, sepsis, and hemorrhagic stroke.

=== Embryo development ===
Cytokines are involved in several developmental processes during embryonic development. (Note: Saito explains "much evidence has suggested that cytokines and chemokines play a very important role in the reproduction, i.e. embryo implantation, endometrial development, and trophoblast growth and differentiation by modulating the immune and endocrine systems."(15)) (Note: Chen explains the regulatory activity of LIF in human and murine embryos: "In conclusion, human preimplantation embryos express LIF and LIF-R mRNA. The expression of these transcripts indicates that preimplantation embryos may be responsive to LIF originating either from the surrounding environment or from the embryos themselves and exerting its function in a paracrine or autocrine manner." (719)) Cytokines are released from the blastocyst, and are also expressed in the endometrium, and have critical roles in the stages of zona hatching, and implantation.

=== Ageing ===
Dysregulated cytokine secretion in the aged population can lead to inflammaging, and render these individuals more vulnerable to age-related diseases like neurodegenerative diseases and type 2 diabetes.

=== Narcolepsy and fatigue ===
A 2024 study found a positive correlation between plasma interleukin IL-2 and fatigue in patients with type 1 narcolepsy.

=== COVID-19 ===
Autoantibodies against cytokines also plays a role in health and disease. In 2020 neutralizing autoantibodies against type I interferons were reported in 10.2% of patients with life-threatening COVID-19.

In a subsequent follow-up study, researchers investigated that the prevalence of autoantibodies against type I interferons increases with age. Only 0.17% of individuals under 70 years of age tested positive for these autoantibodies, compared with 4.2% among those aged 80 to 85 years. Furthermore, autoantibodies against IFN-α/ω were detected in approximately 20% of patients over 80 years old with critical COVID-19.

=== ME/CFS ===
A 2019 review was inconclusive as to whether cytokines play any definitive role in ME/CFS.

== Adverse effects ==
Adverse effects of cytokines have been linked to many disease states and conditions including schizophrenia, major depression, Alzheimer's disease, and cancer.

=== Tumors ===
T regulatory cells (Tregs) and related-cytokines are effectively engaged in the process of tumor immune escape and functionally inhibit immune response against the tumor. Forkhead box protein 3 (Foxp3) as a transcription factor is an essential molecular marker of Treg cells. Foxp3 polymorphism (rs3761548) might be involved in cancer progression like gastric cancer through influencing Tregs function and the secretion of immunomodulatory cytokines such as IL-10, IL-35, and TGF-β. Normal tissue integrity is preserved by feedback interactions between diverse cell types mediated by adhesion molecules and secreted cytokines; disruption of normal feedback mechanisms in cancer threatens tissue integrity.

=== Cytokine storms ===
Over-secretion of cytokines can trigger a dangerous cytokine storm syndrome.

Cytokine storms may have been the cause of severe adverse events during a clinical trial of TGN1412.

Cytokine storms are also suspected to have been the main cause of death in the 1918 "Spanish Flu" pandemic. Deaths were weighted more heavily towards people with healthy immune systems, because of their ability to produce stronger immune responses, with dramatic increases in cytokine levels.

Another example of cytokine storm is seen in acute pancreatitis. Cytokines are integral and implicated in all angles of the cascade, resulting in the systemic inflammatory response syndrome and multi-organ failure associated with this intra-abdominal catastrophe.

In the COVID-19 pandemic, some deaths from COVID-19 have been attributable to cytokine release storms. Data suggest cytokine storms may be the source of extensive lung tissue damage and dysfunctional coagulation in COVID-19 infections.

Prenatal SARS-COV-2 infection in pregnant women is linked to developmental delays with high level of interferon-gamma in cord blood correlated with cognitive delays, while interleukin-6, IL-8, IL-17, and IL-1β were associated with motor delays.

== Medical use as drugs ==
Some cytokines have been developed into protein therapeutics using recombinant DNA technology. Recombinant cytokines being used as drugs as of 2014 include:

- Bone morphogenetic protein (BMP), used to treat bone-related conditions
- Erythropoietin (EPO), used to treat anemia
- Granulocyte colony-stimulating factor (G-CSF), used to treat neutropenia in cancer patients
- Granulocyte macrophage colony-stimulating factor (GM-CSF), used to treat neutropenia and fungal infections in cancer patients
- Interferon alfa, used to treat hepatitis C and multiple sclerosis
- Interferon beta, used to treat multiple sclerosis
- Interleukin 2 (IL-2), used to treat cancer.
- Interleukin 11 (IL-11), used to treat thrombocytopenia in cancer patients.
- Interferon gamma is used to treat chronic granulomatous disease and osteopetrosis

== History of discovery ==
Interferon-alpha, an interferon type I, was identified in 1957 as a protein that interfered with viral replication. The activity of interferon-gamma (the sole member of the interferon type II class) was described in 1965; this was the first identified lymphocyte-derived mediator. Macrophage migration inhibitory factor (MIF) was identified simultaneously in 1966 by John David and Barry Bloom.

In 1969, Dudley Dumonde proposed the term "lymphokine" to describe proteins secreted from lymphocytes and later, proteins derived from macrophages and monocytes in culture were called "monokines". In 1974, pathologist Stanley Cohen, M.D. (not to be confused with the Nobel laureate named Stanley Cohen, who was a PhD biochemist; nor with the MD geneticist Stanley Norman Cohen) published an article describing the production of MIF in virus-infected allantoic membrane and kidney cells, showing its production is not limited to immune cells. This led to his proposal of the term cytokine. In 1993, Ogawa described the early acting growth factors, intermediate acting growth factors and late acting growth factors.

== Detection ==
Because cytokines often circulate in very low concentrations, highly sensitive assays are required for their measurement. Various multiplex immunoassays have been developed to detect and quantify cytokines in plasma and other biofluids. For example, the NULISAseq Inflammation Panel 250 is a multiplex assay designed to measure 250 low-abundance inflammation targets, including cytokines, chemokines, and growth factors (such as IL-1B, IL-6, IFN-γ, TNF, CXCL10, and CCL2). According to the manufacturer, the assay utilizes NULISA technology to achieve attomolar sensitivity and a 12-log dynamic range from low sample volumes without the need for dilution.

== See also ==
- Adipokines
- Apoptosis
- Cytokine redundancy
- Cytokine release syndrome
- Cytokine secretion assay
- ELISA assays
- Myokine
- Signal transduction
- Thymic stromal lymphopoietin
- Virokine
