= Virus Research =

- March 2020 issue
- Discipline: Virology
- Language: English
- Edited by: Ben Berkhout

Publication details
- History: 1984–present
- Publisher: Elsevier
- Frequency: Monthly
- Open access: Hybrid
- Impact factor: 6.286 (2021)

Standard abbreviations
- ISO 4: Virus Res.

Indexing
- ISSN: 0168-1702 (print); 1872-7492 (web)

Links
- Journal homepage; Online access

Virus Research is a peer-reviewed scientific journal which focuses on fundamental research in all aspects of virology. The journal was established in 1984 by Brian Mahy and Richard Compans.

== Abstracting and indexing ==
The journal is abstracted and indexed in:

- BIOSIS Citation Index
- Chemical Abstracts
- Current Contents - Life Sciences
- Embase
- PubMed/MEDLINE
- PASCAL/FRANCIS
- Reference Update
- Elsevier BIOBASE
- Scopus

According to the Journal Citation Reports, the journal has a 2018 impact factor of 2.736. In 2021, the impact factor was updated to 6.286.
