= Julius Youngner =

- Born: Julius S. Youngner; 24 October 1920; New York, New York
- Died: April 27, 2017 (aged 96); Pittsburgh, Pennsylvania
- Education: New York University; University of Michigan
- Known for: First polio vaccine, equine influenza vaccine
- Spouse: Rina Youngner
- Scientific career
- Fields: Microbiology; Virology
- Workplaces: United States Army(-1946); U.S. Public Health Service, National Institutes of Health, United States Navy; University of Pittsburgh School of Medicine and Department of Microbiology & Molecular Genetics (1949-2000)

Julius S. Youngner (24 October 1920 – 27 April 2017) was an American Distinguished Service Professor in the School of Medicine and Department of Microbiology & Molecular Genetics at University of Pittsburgh responsible for advances necessary for development of a vaccine for poliomyelitis and the first intranasal equine influenza vaccine.

Youngner survived many infections as a young child which left him with a lifelong interest in infectious disease. After completing an undergraduate degree in English, he was trained in Biology at University of Michigan before being drafted into the Army. After the war, he joined the U.S. Public Health Service, National Institutes of Health Cancer Institute before joining the Salk team responsible for polio vaccine.

As a member of the Jonas Salk research team, Youngner contributed in the development of polio vaccine, including techniques for large scale production of poliovirus and the rapid color test measurement of polio virus in living tissue. He is considered "one of the seminal figures in contemporary virology and it's been that way for more than 50 years" by Arthur S. Levine, senior vice chancellor for the health sciences at University of Pittsburgh. Research by Youngner and colleague Samuel Salvin was also responsible for the discovery of gamma interferon.

Youngner was an important early pioneer in vaccine development, testing, and government licensing of drugs before allowing them to market. He was critical of Cutter Laboratories virus manufacturing prior to deaths resulting from Cutter inactivated vaccine. He continued to promote research integrity and actions on misconduct until the end of his career.

== Early life ==
Younger was born in 1920 in Manhattan, New York, where his father was a businessman. When he was seven-years-old Youngner was nearly killed by lobar pneumonia.

== Education and Manhattan Project ==
Youngner graduated Evander Childs High School, when he was 15 years old, and received a B.A. in English from New York University in 1939. After completing a Sc.D. degree in microbiology at the University of Michigan, Youngner stayed on as a faculty member, and left in 1947 to join the National Cancer Institute (NCI) in Bethesda. Youngner was drafted into basic U.S. Army infantry training. Upon completion he screened at Oak Ridge, Tennessee and assigned to classified research at University of Rochester School of Medicine on uranium salts. The effects of inhaled uranium salts on human tissue was important to the war effort, related to purification of uranium for nuclear research and weapons. Youngner never knew the research was related to weapons until the end of the war. He thought nuclear energy would be used for planes or submarines for transportation.

== Career ==
In 1949, Youngner moved to the University of Pittsburgh to pursue virology at and, subsequently, to the University of Pittsburgh School of Medicine for the rest of his career. In 1960 he was appointed professor of microbiology. Between 1985 and 1989, he was chairman of the Department of Microbiology, Biochemistry and Molecular Biology. Working on polio prevention, he was responsible for three key advancements in poliomyelitis vaccine development. 1. He proved a method for separation of monkey kidney cells, which led to techniques for large scale production. 2. He developed a process to prevent infection while retaining ability to vaccinate, and 3. safety testing for batches of vaccine and anti-polio antibodies in test subjects. or in the words of his colleague: "“Juli figured out how to grow the virus, how to inactivate it, and then he figured how to test the immune response to see if it worked.”

=== Trypsinization ===
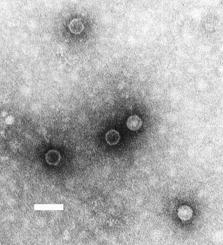
Poliovirus particles in cell culture.

Youngner demonstrated the separation of monkey kidney cells using the pancreatic enzyme trypsin, a technique previously proven by the Rockefeller Institute could be applied to high titer virus stocks. Applying this method to a single kidney "could produce enough raw material for 6000 shots of polio vaccine." This advance in production of virus raw material directly led to vaccine viability.

=== Titration ===
The measurement developed by Youngner for safely and quickly testing batches of vaccine and also antibodies to the virus after application were important advancements necessary for vaccine success. Youngner identified that a difference in pH, as indicated by metabolic activity by other researchers, could be used to identify cell cultures infected with virus and also cultures with antibodies to virus. This pH could be easily indicated by phenol red in a tissue-culture system.

=== Inactivated poliovirus ===
The Salk vaccine is based upon formalin inactivated wild type virus. The key to effective inactivation depended upon a color test developed by Youngner, which allowed formalin induced viral protein degradation to be accurately plotted. From Youngner's work, formalin application for six days was projected to produce only "one live virus particle in 100 million doses of vaccine." By 1954, the first virus trials had immunized 800,000 children against polio.

=== Temperature-sensitive virus ===
Youngner studied the role of in-apparent infections in an effort to link a selection of wild type virus to chronic and persistent infections. His team studied the mechanisms of these infections, and also infections of vesicular stomatitis virus, sendai virus, and persistent newcastle disease virus.

=== First intranasal equine influenza vaccine ===
Youngner is responsible for the first equine influenza vaccine, based upon cold-adapted influenza virus. Previous methods of vaccination required treatment up to six times per year without adequate protection. In collaboration with Flu Avert I.N., approval was granted for the use of cold-adapted virus that only replicates at temperatures in the respiratory tract, offering "unprecedented level of protection in the prevention of equine flu" and offering protection for up to twelve months.

== Patents ==
Youngner has contributed patents on Lipid purification and concentration of viruses and vaccines, an important contribution to the reduction of egg protein and associated vaccine induced complications, antitumor processes of Brucella, and numerous contributions to cold adapted influenza virus.

== Personal life ==
Youngner met and married his first wife, Tula Liakakis, in Michigan, in 1943. They had a son, Stuart, and a daughter, Lisa. Tula died of Hodgkin's Disease in 1963. He married Rina Balter in 1964. They had no children together but were active in the Jewish community in Pittsburgh, PA. He died there after a brief illness.

== See also ==
- TWiV 373: The distinguished virology career of Julius S. Youngner on YouTube
- How A Pittsburgh-Made Polio Vaccine Helped Beat A Disease That Terrified A Nation on 90.5 WESA Pittsburgh's NPR News Station
