= Lynn W. Enquist =

American molecular biologist

- Education: Medical College of Virginia
- Scientific career
- Doctoral advisor: S. Gaylen Bradley

Lynn William Enquist is professor emeritus in molecular biology at Princeton University, as well as founding editor of the journal Annual Review of Virology. His research focuses on neuroinvasive alpha-herpesviruses.

== Education ==
In 1963, Enquist graduated from Milbank High School in Milbank, South Dakota. He received a Bachelor of Science in bacteriology from South Dakota State University in 1967. He received his Ph.D. in microbiology from the Medical College of Virginia, Virginia Commonwealth University in 1971 working with S. Gaylen Bradley to study streptomyces biology. He did postdoctoral training at the Roche Institute of Molecular Biology from 1971 to 1973 studying bacteriophage lambda replication and recombination with Ann Skalka.

== Career ==
He served in the Public Health Service from 1973 to 1981. He was a senior staff fellow at the National Institutes of Health in the laboratory of Dr. Philip Leder working with Robert Weisberg from 1974 to 1977 studying bacteriophage lambda site-specific recombination and development of recombinant DNA technology. In 1977, he moved to the National Cancer Institute where he continued the development of recombinant DNA technology and also began his work on neurotropic herpes viruses, researching under Dr. George Vande Woude. In 1981 he left the National Cancer Institute to become research director at Molecular Genetics Incorporated in Minnetonka, Minnesota, where he worked on recombinant DNA based viral vaccines. In 1984, he joined DuPont as a research leader, where he ran a laboratory studying neurotropic viruses. In 1990, he joined DuPont Merck Pharmaceutical Company, where he was a senior research fellow working on developing neurotropic viruses as tools for gene therapy and studying the mammalian nervous system. In 1993, he accepted the position of tenured full professor of molecular biology at Princeton University. His research interests are in the field of neurovirology, specifically on the mechanisms of herpesvirus spread and pathogenesis in the mammalian nervous system. He teaches an undergraduate course in virology and won the President's award for teaching excellence in 2001.

== Research ==
Enquist's laboratory focused on understanding the molecular mechanisms by which neuroinvasive alpha-herpesviruses spread in the mammalian nervous system. His work employs imaging technology, cell biology, and viral genetics to reveal how virion components move inside and between neurons. Experiments are divided between two general areas to visualize how infection spreads from one neuron to another in vitro (dissociated neurons) and in vivo (living animals and tissues). His students have developed compartmented neuronal cultures to establish separate fluid environments for neuronal axons and the soma from which they emanate. These compartmented neuronal cultures are used for in vitro study of directional infection of neurons by alpha herpesviruses. Students also have constructed a variety of herpesvirus mutants that define mechanisms of neuronal spread and provide useful tools for tracing neuronal circuitry in living animals and uncovering mechanisms of alpha-herpesvirus pathogenesis. Enquist has published 324 publications indexed in the National Center for Biotechnology Information database, and is an inventor on at least four U.S. patents.

== Memberships ==
Enquist is the founding editor of the Annual Review of Virology. He is a fellow of the American Academy of Microbiology (elected 1994) and the American Association for the Advancement of Science (elected 1998). He was also elected to the American Academy of Arts and Sciences in 2010. He is a past president of both the American Society for Virology (2004–2005), and the American Society for Microbiology (2015). (Note: He became president in 2015, after that year's general meeting. He was succeeded by Susan E. Sharp, who served 2016–2017.) He was a member of the National Science Advisory Board for Biosecurity from 2005 to 2007.

He continues to hold leadership and advisory roles in the American Society for Microbiology, including current service on the Council of Past Presidents and the Academy Governors.

== Awards ==
Enquist won the Javits Neuroscience Investigator Award from the National Institute of Neurological Disorders and Stroke in 2017.
