= Patricia G. Spear =

American virologist

- Born: Patricia Gail Spear; 1942 (age 83–84)
- Education: Florida State University, BA, 1964; Florida State University, MS, 1965; University of Chicago, PhD, 1969
- Known for: Expertise in herpes simplex virus
- Spouse: Peter Meyer (d. 2002)
- Awards: National Academy of Sciences Member
- Scientific career
- Workplaces: Northwestern University
- Doctoral advisor: Bernard Roizman

Patricia Gail Spear (born 1942) is an American virologist. She is a professor emeritus of microbiology and immunology at Northwestern University in Evanston, Illinois. She is best known for her pioneering work studying the herpes simplex virus. Spear is a past president of the American Society for Virology and an elected member of the National Academy of Sciences.

== Education and early career ==
Spear began her undergraduate education at Florida State University. She went to study nursing and ultimately switched her major to bacteriology with a minor in chemistry graduating in 1964. One year later, she received her Master of Science from Florida State in bacteriology and then enrolled in a graduate program in virology at the University of Chicago.

For her doctoral work, Spear joined the laboratory of Bernard Roizman to conduct research on herpes simplex virus (HSV). In an interview, she noted: "I thought it was mind-blowing how the virus could change the shape and behavior of the cell before killing it off." There, she developed a method to purify the herpes simplex enveloped nucleocapsid, known as a virion, and determined the number of proteins it contained using electrophoresis. Following her PhD, she stayed in Roizman's laboratory for another two years, characterizing the approximately 30 HSV proteins she had identified.

In 1971, Spear became a postdoctoral fellow in the laboratory of Gerald Edelman at the Rockefeller University in New York City. There, she received intensive training in immunology, studying the development of the immune system in mice, tracking when the spleen and thymus become populated with T cells and B cells.

Following her postdoctoral fellowship, she became an assistant professor in the department of microbiology at the University of Chicago, focusing her research program on HSV, and then became chair of the department of microbiology and immunology at Northwestern University.

== Research ==
During her tenure at the University of Chicago, Spear developed a new area of research studying HSV glycoproteins in the viral envelop. Her group worked to describe the surface glycoproteins and characterized their functions in cell fusion and the immune response. In some mutant strains of HSV, infection promotes the fusion of infected host cells within lesions which is one possible mechanism by which the virus spreads from cell to cell. By studying different mutant strains of HSV, Spear found that the viral glycoprotein gB promotes cell fusion, while another glycoprotein called gC can act to suppress cell fusion.

Spear has also investigated how HSV enters the host cell by working to identify cell-surface receptors recognized by the virus. Her group found that the initial cell-surface receptor for both HSV 1 and HSV2 is heparan sulfate, a carbohydrate component of some proteoglycans that is recognized and bound by the viral glycoproteins gB and gC. When Spear re-located her laboratory from University of Chicago to Northwestern University, her team identified three different classes of entry receptors: a cell-surface protein called herpes virus entry mediator (HVEM), two members of the immunoglobulin superfamily called Nectin-1 and Nectin-2, and

== Leadership ==
For 16 years, Spear served as chair of the department of microbiology and immunology at Northwestern University. From 2003 to 2004, she served as president of the American Society for Virology.

== Awards and honors ==
- Elected Fellow, American Academy of Arts and Sciences (2003)
- Elected to Membership, National Academy of Sciences (2002)
- Elected Fellow, American Association for the Advancement of Science (AAAS) (2000)
- MERIT Award, National Institute of Allergy and Infectious Diseases (1999)
- Elected Fellow, American Academy of Microbiology (1999)
- MERIT Award, National Cancer Institute (1987)
