= Eric P. Skaar =

American microbiologist (born 1974)

- Born: 1974 (age 51–52); Toms River, New Jersey
- Title: Founding Director, Vanderbilt Institute for Infection, Immunology, and Inflammation (VI4), Ernest W. Goodpasture Professor of Pathology, Vice Chair for Basic Research

Academic background
- Academic advisors: Olaf Schneewind, Hank Seifert

Academic work
- Discipline: Pathology, Microbiology, Immunology
- Institutions: Vanderbilt University Medical Center

Eric P. Skaar is an American microbiologist, the Ernest W. Goodpasture Professor of Pathology, Microbiology and Immunology at Vanderbilt University Medical Center, and a University Distinguished Professor at Vanderbilt University.

== Education and career ==
Skaar earned his Bachelor of Science degree in Bacteriology at the University of Wisconsin-Madison in 1996, and his Ph.D. in Immunology and Microbial Pathogenesis and Master’s Degree in Public Health in Biostatistics and Epidemiology at Northwestern University in 2002. After completing a postdoctoral fellowship in Microbiology at the University of Chicago, Skaar joined the Vanderbilt faculty in 2005 as an assistant professor, and was named to the endowed Ernest W. Goodpasture Chair in Pathology in 2012.

He is the Vice Chair for Research in the Department of Pathology, Microbiology and Immunology, and the Founding Director of the Vanderbilt Institute for Infection, Immunology, and Inflammation (VI4).

The Skaar laboratory focuses on nutritional immunity which studies that aspect of the innate immune response to infectious diseases. They have studied (i) nutrient acquisition by bacterial pathogens, (ii) how vertebrate immune proteins sequester nutrients during the pathogenesis of infection and cancer, (iii) competition for nutrients between pathogens and the healthy microbiome, and (iv) the impact of diet on infection. His research has resulted in approximately 260 published research articles.

== Research ==
For bacterial pathogens to cause disease, they must obtain nutrients inside their vertebrate hosts. The primary nutrients that are limiting to the growth of bacteria inside vertebrates are metals, because vertebrates have developed numerous metal chelation systems that serve as a host defense against microbial infection. This is one of the aspects of the general concept called nutritional immunity. The Skaar laboratory is interested in identifying the host and bacterial factors that are involved in this competition for metal during the host-pathogen interaction. In particular, they focus on diseases caused by the human pathogens Staphylococcus aureus, Acinetobacter baumannii, Bacillus anthracis (Anthrax), and Clostridioides difficile. The long-term goal of the research is to develop novel therapies to treat microbial diseases.

Dr. Skaar and his team discovered that the innate immune protein calprotectin inhibits microbial growth through manganese binding, representing the first example of the host immune system sequestering manganese to inhibit microbial growth . Dr. Skaar, in collaboration with Dr. David Giedroc, reported the first example of a vertebrate zinc metallochaperone which they named ZNG1. ZNG1 is responsible for transferring zinc to METAP1, a critical metalloprotein involved in regulating protein activity across eukaryotes. In addition, the Skaar laboratory has reported the discovery of iron storage organelles in Gram positive bacteria called ferrosomes, and bacterial hydrophilins that promote desiccation resistance in hospital acquired pathogens.

Awards

Skaar is a Fellow of the American Academy of Microbiology (ASM) and the American Association for the Advancement of Science (AAAS). He has also been the recipient of the Pfizer Aspire Award, the Searle Scholars Award, the ICAAC/IDSA Young Investigator Award, the Chancellor’s award for Research, the Stanley Cohen Award for Research, was named a Burroughs Wellcome Investigator in the Pathogenesis of Infectious Diseases, and is the recipient of the 2025 National Academy of Sciences (NAS) award in Molecular Biology for young scientists and is a member of the National Academy of Sciences.

== Notable publications ==
Green E,… Skaar EP (2022). Bacterial hydrophilins promote pathogen desiccation tolerance. Cell Host & Microbe 30 (7), pgs: 975-987.

Pi H,… Skaar EP (2023). Clostridioides difficile ferrosome organelles combat nutritional immunity. Nature 623 (7989), pgs: 1009-1016.

Weiss A,... Skaar EP (2022). Zn-regulated GTPase metalloprotein activator 1 modulates vertebrate zinc homeostasis. Cell 185 (12), pgs: 2148-2163.

Zackular JP,... Skaar EP (2016). Dietary zinc alters the microbiota and decreases resistance to Clostridium difficile infection. Nature medicine 22 (11), pgs: 1330-1334

Cassat JE, Skaar EP (2013). Iron in Infection and Immunity. Cell host & microbe 13 (5), pgs: 509-519

Hood MI, Skaar EP (2012). Nutritional immunity: transition metals at the pathogen–host interface. Nature Reviews Microbiology 10 (8), pgs: 525-537

Corbin BD,... Skaar EP (2008). Metal Chelation and Inhibition of Bacterial Growth in Tissue Abscesses. Science 305 (5690), pgs:1626-1628

Skaar EP,... Schneewind O (2004). Iron-Source Preference of Staphylococcus aureus Infections. Science 305 (5690), pgs:1626-1628
