= Bernard Moss =

American virologist

- Born: July 26, 1937 (age 89); Brooklyn
- Education: Massachusetts Institute of Technology, New York University School of Medicine, and New York University
- Scientific career
- Doctoral students: Peixuan Guo

Bernard Moss (born July 26, 1937) is a virologist at the National Institute of Allergy and Infectious Diseases, part of the United States National Institutes of Health. He is the Chief of the NIAID Laboratory of Viral Diseases and of the NIAID Genetic Engineering Section. He is known for his work on poxviruses.

== Career ==
Moss received his bachelor's degree in biology in 1957 from New York University, his M.D. in 1961 from the New York University School of Medicine, and his Ph.D. in biochemistry from the Massachusetts Institute of Technology. He joined NIAID in 1966 and became Chief of the Laboratory of Viral Diseases in 1984.

In addition to his NIAID position, Moss is an adjunct professor at George Washington University and the University of Maryland.

== Awards and memberships ==
- Dickson Prize for Medical Research
- Invitrogen Eukaryotic Expression Award
- ICN International Prize in Virology
- Taylor International Prize in Medicine
- Bristol-Myers Squibb Award for Distinguished Achievement in Infectious Disease Research
- International Poxvirus, Asfarvirus and Iridovirus Lifetime Achievement Award

Moss is a member of the United States National Academy of Sciences and the American Academy of Microbiology, a fellow of the American Association for the Advancement of Science, and a former president of the American Society for Virology.

== Research ==
Moss is best known for research on the poxvirus family. He was one of the discoverers of the cap found in viral mRNAs. He has also studied virally encoded immune defense proteins, or proteins encoded by the genomes of large DNA viruses that reduce the ability of the host's immune system to respond to viral infection. He coined the term "virokine" to describe a class of these proteins that have high sequence identity to human cytokines. Most importantly, he developed a technology for exploiting the vaccinia virus as a mechanism for developing novel vaccines. A vaccine for rabies virus in current clinical use was developed using this technology.
