= Purnell W. Choppin =

American virologist (1929–2021)

- Born: July 4, 1929; Baton Rouge, Louisiana, US
- Died: July 3, 2021 (aged 91); Washington, D.C., US
- Resting place: Arlington National Cemetery
- Education: Louisiana State University, M.D.
- Known for: HHMI President, 1987-1999
- Scientific career
- Fields: Virology
- Institutions: Rockefeller University, Howard Hughes Medical Institute

Purnell Whittington Choppin (July 4, 1929 – July 3, 2021) was an American virologist. He served on the faculty of Rockefeller University for nearly thirty years, becoming the Leon Hess Professor of Virology. He moved to the Howard Hughes Medical Institute in 1985, became the president of the institute in 1987, and retired in 1999, succeeded by Thomas Cech. Until his death in 2021, he was the chair of the Scientific Advisory Board at the Center for the Study of Hepatitis C, supported by a university consortium consisting of Rockefeller, Weill Cornell Medical College, and New York-Presbyterian Hospital.

== Early life and education ==
Choppin was born on July 4, 1929, in Baton Rouge, Louisiana. He attended medical school at Louisiana State University and received an M.D. in 1953.Before beginning his independent research career, Choppin did his internship and residency at Washington University School of Medicine and Barnes Hospital in St. Louis, Missouri. He also served as a medical officer in the United States Air Force.

== Academic career ==
Choppin began work at Rockefeller in 1957 as a research fellow and joined the faculty there in 1959, heading a virology research program focused on the influenza virus. He became a full professor and senior physician at Rockefeller in 1970, and served in various administrative roles including the vice president of academic programs and the dean of graduate studies. In 1985 Choppin moved from his position as the Leon Hess Professor of Virology at Rockefeller to the Howard Hughes Medical Institute, where he served as vice president and chief scientific officer. He assumed the presidency in 1987, succeeding Donald Fredrickson. During his presidency, both the institute's budget and its number of scientists increased dramatically. Choppin retired from HHMI at the end of 1999, succeeded by Thomas Cech.

Choppin became a member of the National Academy of Sciences in 1977. He received the University of Chicago's Howard Taylor Ricketts Award in 1978 and the National Academy of Sciences' Selman A. Waksman Award in Microbiology in 1984. In the early 1980s, Choppin was among the group of American virologists who helped organize and became the founding members of the American Society for Virology. He was elected to both the American Philosophical Society and the American Academy of Arts and Sciences in 1988.
