= Harold Ginsberg =

American microbiologist

Harold Samuel "Harry" Ginsberg (May 27, 1917 – February 2, 2003) was an American microbiologist who made early discoveries in virology and infectious disease.

Ginsberg was born on May 27, 1917, in Daytona Beach, Florida. He earned his undergraduate degree from Duke University in 1937 and received his medical degree from the Tulane University School of Medicine in 1941.

While serving in the United States Army as a first lieutenant during World War II and stationed at a military hospital in England, Ginsberg was responsible for caring for soldiers injured during the Normandy landings. There he discovered a pattern of hepatitis infections in those individuals who had received blood transfusions. Further investigation showed that the patients had contracted Hepatitis B from pooled plasma, which led to changes in transfusion practices and resulted in a significant reduction in illness and death among soldiers being treated. In recognition of these efforts, he was awarded the Legion of Merit in 1945.

After completing his military service, he was an associate at the Rockefeller Institute in New York City starting in 1946. He was on the faculty of Western Reserve University starting in 1951, where research he conducted showed that adenoviruses, which could lie dormant in the adenoids for extended periods, were among the causes of atypical pneumonia and acute respiratory disease. Ginsberg showed the process by which the adenovirus caused disease after entering host cells, leading to the creation of vaccines against various infectious diseases and showing how cancers could be triggered by oncoviruses.

He moved to the University of Pennsylvania in 1960 and Columbia University in 1973, heading each school's department of microbiology. Based on research done investigating the spread of acute respiratory distress syndrome in groups of Army recruits, Ginsberg's research on the protein structure of adenovirues led to the development of gene therapy in which working copies of genes can be implanted into the human body by way of genetically modified adenoviruses. At the National Institute of Allergy and Infectious Diseases, Ginsberg performed research on Simian immunodeficiency virus, a retrovirus that infects primates in Africa, studying how SIV causes infection in animals, which provided insights on the spread of HIV and AIDS in humans.

A widely published author of more than 200 scientific papers and a standard text on microbiology, Ginsberg was inducted as a member of the National Academy of Sciences. Dr. Saul J. Silverstein of the Columbia University College of Physicians and Surgeons called Ginsberg "a giant in this field" whose "discoveries involving the genetics of adenoviruses paved the way for the development of gene therapy". Dr. Robert M. Chanock, who headed the Laboratory of Infectious Diseases at the NIAID, noted that "he had accomplished all he could with adenoviruses" before moving on to study HIV.

A resident of both Woods Hole, Massachusetts and Washington, D.C., Ginsberg died at age 85 on February 2, 2003 in Woods Hole due to pneumonia. He was survived by his wife, the former Marion Reibstein Ginsberg, as well as by two daughters, two sons and eight grandchildren.
