= Archives of Virology =

- Discipline: Virology
- Language: English
- Edited by: Tim Skern

Publication details
- Former name(s): Archiv für die gesamte Virusforschung
- History: 1939–present
- Publisher: Springer Science+Business Media
- Frequency: Monthly
- Impact factor: 2.574 (2020)

Standard abbreviations
- ISO 4: Arch. Virol.

Indexing
- CODEN: ARVIDF
- ISSN: 0304-8608 (print); 1432-8798 (web)
- LCCN: 75646737
- OCLC no.: 02243267

Links
- Journal homepage; Online access

The Archives of Virology is a peer-reviewed scientific journal covering research in virology. It is published by Springer Science+Business Media and is the official journal of the Virology Division of the International Union of Microbiological Societies. It was established in 1939 as the Archiv für die gesamte Virusforschung and obtained its current title in 1975. According to the Journal Citation Reports, the journal has a 2020 impact factor of 2.574.
