= Journal of Virology =

- Discipline: Virology
- Language: English
- Edited by: Felicia Goodrum and Stacey Schultz-Cherry

Publication details
- History: 1967–present
- Publisher: American Society for Microbiology (United States)
- Frequency: Biweekly
- Open access: Delayed, after 6 months
- Impact factor: 4.0 (2023)

Standard abbreviations
- ISO 4: J. Virol.

Indexing
- CODEN: JOVIAM
- ISSN: 0022-538X (print); 1098-5514 (web)
- LCCN: 68007255
- OCLC no.: 422052558

Links
- Journal homepage; Online access; Online archive

The Journal of Virology is a biweekly peer-reviewed scientific journal that covers research concerning all aspects of virology. It was established in 1967 and is published by the American Society for Microbiology. Research papers are available free online 6 months after print publication.

The current editors-in-chief are Felicia Goodrum (University of Arizona) and Stacey Schultz-Cherry (St. Jude Children's Research Hospital). Past editors-in-chief include Rozanne M. Sandri-Goldin (University of California, Irvine, California) (2012-2022), Lynn W. Enquist (2002–2012), Thomas Shenk (1994–2002), and Arnold J. Levine (1984–1994).

== Abstracting and indexing ==
The journal is abstracted and indexed in AGRICOLA, Biological Abstracts, BIOSIS Previews, Chemical Abstracts, Current Contents, EMBASE, MEDLINE/Index Medicus/PubMed, and the Science Citation Index Expanded. Its 2023 impact factor was 4.0
