= Thomas Shenk =

American biologist (born 1947)

Thomas E. Shenk
- Education: University of Detroit; Rutgers University
- Known for: SV40, Adenovirus, Human cytomegalovirus
- Scientific career
- Workplaces: Princeton University

Thomas Eugene Shenk (born 1947) is an American virologist. He is currently Emeritus Professor of Life Sciences in the Department of Molecular Biology at Princeton University.

== Career ==
Shenk received a BS in biology from the University of Detroit, and earned a Ph.D. in Microbiology under the mentorship of Victor Stollar from Rutgers University. He then trained as a postdoctoral fellow with noble laureate Paul Berg at Stanford University School of Medicine.

He was Assistant Professor of Microbiology at the University of Connecticut Health Science Center (1975–80) and Professor of Microbiology at the State University of New York at Stony Brook (1980–84).

In 1984, Shenk moved to Princeton University as the James A. Elkins Jr. Professor of Life Sciences and a founding member of the Department of Molecular Biology. He served as Chair of that department (1996-2004), and as a founding Co-Director of the Princeton University Program in Global Health and Health Policy (2008–15). Shenk was named an American Cancer Society Research Professor (1986-), and was appointed an Investigator of the Howard Hughes Medical Institute (1989–99) during his years at Princeton.

Shenk is a virologist whose work has focused on the DNA tumor virus, adenovirus, and the herpesvirus, human cytomegalovirus. In the adenovirus system, he developed technologies for introducing mutations into the viral genome and employed that technology to elucidate the functions of viral genes and their oncogenic impact on the infected cell. For cytomegalovirus he has applied genetic, transcriptomic, metabolomic and proteomic approaches to dissect viral gene functions and their roles during active viral growth and latency.

He served as President of the American Society for Virology (1997–98) and the American Society for Microbiology (2003–04). He has also served as Editor-in-Chief of the Journal of Virology (1994-2002) and as Chair of the American Society for Microbiology Publications Board (2008–17). He has also served on not-for-profit boards including the Fox Chase Cancer Center (2009–15) the Hepatitis B Foundation (2012-) and the Blumberg Institute (2015-).

In addition to academia, Shenk has pursued interests in the biotechnology and pharmaceutical industries. He has served as a director at biotech companies, including Novalon Pharmaceutical Corp. (1996-2000), Cell Genesys, Inc. (2001–09), CV Therapeutics, Inc. (2005-2009), Vical, Inc. (2015-2019) and MeiraGTx, Ltd (2015-); and he served on the board of directors of the pharmaceutical company, Merck and Co. (2001–12). Shenk cofounded several biotech companies, most recently Evrys Bio, LLC, that is developing sirtuin 2 modulators as broad-spectrum antivirals, where he chairs the board of managers (2013-); and PMV Pharma, Inc., that is developing therapeutics designed to reactivate defective p53 tumor suppressor proteins, where he serves on the scientific advisory board (2013-).

In 2021, Shenk transferred to Emeritus status within the Princeton department of Molecular Biology.

== Awards and honors ==
Shenk received the Eli Lilly and Company Award in Microbiology and Immunology from the American Society for Microbiology in 1982 for his work on adenovirus gene functions. He was awarded the Arthur Kornberg and Paul Berg Lifetime Achievement Award in Biomedical Sciences from the Stanford University School of Medicine Alumni Association in 2011.

He was elected to fellowship in the American Academy of Microbiology in 1993, membership in the U.S. National Academy of Sciences in 1996, and membership the U.S. National Academy of Medicine in 1996. He was elected a fellow of the American Academy of Arts and Sciences in 2002, a member of the American Philosophical Society in 2015 and a fellow of the National Academy of Inventors in 2018.
