= Justice Gilbert =

Justice Gilbert may refer to:

- James H. Gilbert (born 1947), associate justice of the Minnesota Supreme Court
- S. Price Gilbert (1862–1951), associate justice of the Georgia Supreme Court

== See also ==
- Judge Gilbert (disambiguation)
