= CULC =

CULC may refer to:

- Cambridge Universities Labour Club
- Cambridge University Liberal Club
- Clough Undergraduate Learning Commons, a large academic building at Georgia Tech
