= Jean-Lou Chameau =

French academic administrator

2nd President of the KAUST
- In office 2013–2017
- Preceded by: Shih Choon Fong
- Succeeded by: Nadhmi Al-Nasr (interim); Tony F. Chan

7th President of the California Institute of Technology
- In office 2006–2013
- Preceded by: David Baltimore
- Succeeded by: Thomas Rosenbaum

Personal details
- Born: 1953 (age 72–73) France
- Education: Arts et Métiers ParisTech; Stanford University
- Scientific career
- Fields: Civil engineering
- Workplaces: Purdue University; Georgia Institute of Technology
- Thesis: Probabilistic and hazard analysis for pore pressure increase in soils due to seismic loading (1981)
- Doctoral advisor: G. Wayne Clough
- Doctoral students: J. Carlos Santamarina

Jean-Lou Chameau (born 1953) is a French civil engineer who served as the president of King Abdullah University of Science and Technology (KAUST) from 2013 to 2017, and California Institute of Technology from 2006 to 2013. In addition, he previously served as a Dean of Engineering and provost of the Georgia Institute of Technology.

== Early life and education ==
Chameau was born in France in 1953. He received his secondary, undergraduate, and graduate education in France where he attended the École nationale supérieure des arts et métiers (aka. Arts et Métiers ParisTech). He later went to the United States to obtain his Ph.D in civil engineering from Stanford University in 1981 while working under the direction of G. Wayne Clough.

== Career ==
In 1980, Chameau joined Purdue University, where he became full professor in civil engineering and Head of the geotechnical engineering program. In 1991, he was nominated director of the School of Civil and Environmental Engineering at Georgia Tech. He then became Dean of Engineering before progressing to Provost at Georgia Tech.

Chameau became president of Caltech on 1 September 2006, succeeding David Baltimore who served nearly nine years in the post. On February 16, 2013, Chameau was appointed the president of King Abdullah University of Science and Technology, succeeding the founding president, Shih Choon Fong. Chameau retired as the president of KAUST in August 2017.

In 2010, he was awarded membership in the Legion of Honour in the grade of Chevalier.

== Personal life ==
Chameau is married to Carol Carmichael, former director of the Institute for Sustainable Technology and Development, now known as the Brook Byers Institute for Sustainable Systems at Georgia Tech.

Academic offices
Preceded by David Baltimore	7th President of the California Institute of Technology; 2006 – 2013	Succeeded by Thomas Rosenbaum
Preceded by Shih Choon Fong	2nd President of the King Abdullah University of Science and Technology; 2013 – 2017	Succeeded by Tony F. Chan
