= Aaron Shatkin =

Aaron J. Shatkin (18 July 1934 – 4 June 2012) was an American professor and director of the Center for Advanced Biotechnology and Medicine at Rutgers University and a scientist at the Cancer Institute of New Jersey at Robert Wood Johnson Medical School. He was known for his work as a virologist studying reoviruses.

== Education ==
Shatkin graduated from summa cum laude Bowdoin College in chemistry in 1956. He earned a PhD from The Rockefeller University in 1961, working in the laboratory of Edward Tatum studying Neurospora crassa.

== Career ==
Shatkin began studying reoviruses as a postdoctoral fellow at the National Institutes of Health with Norman Salzman. He then opened his own laboratory at the Roche Institute of Molecular Biology in Nutley, New Jersey, studying mRNA in reoviruses.

In 1985, he moved to Rutgers University, where he was a University Professor of Molecular Biology. He was the founding director of the Center for Advanced Biotechnology and Medicine at Rutgers and a scientist at the Cancer Institute of New Jersey at Robert Wood Johnson Medical School.

Shatkin was elected to the National Academy of Sciences in 1981. He was also an elected fellow of the American Academy of Microbiology, the American Academy of Arts and Sciences and the American Association for the Advancement of Science. He was the founding editor-in-chief of the Journal of Molecular and Cellular Biology.

== Personal life ==
Shatkin died of cancer at his home in Scotch Plains, New Jersey. He was predeceased in 2009 by his wife, Joan, whom he was married to for 52 years. They had one son.
