= David Baltimore =

American biologist and Nobel laureate (1938–2025)

- Baltimore in 2021

6th President of the California Institute of Technology
- In office 1997–2005
- Preceded by: Thomas Eugene Everhart
- Succeeded by: Jean-Lou Chameau

6th President of Rockefeller University
- In office 1990–1991
- Preceded by: Joshua Lederberg
- Succeeded by: Torsten Wiesel

Personal details
- Born: March 7, 1938 New York City, U.S.
- Died: September 6, 2025 (aged 87) Woods Hole, Massachusetts, U.S.
- Spouse: Alice S. Huang (m. 1968)
- Children: 1
- Education: Swarthmore College (BA) Rockefeller University (PhD)
- Website: www.bbe.caltech.edu/content/david-baltimore
- Scientific career
- Known for: Reverse transcriptase; Baltimore classification
- Awards: NAS Award in Molecular Biology (1974); Nobel Prize in Physiology or Medicine (1975); Sir Hans Krebs Medal (1997); National Medal of Science (1999); Lasker Award (2021)
- Fields: Cell biology, microbiology
- Workplaces: Massachusetts Institute of Technology; Rockefeller University; California Institute of Technology
- Thesis: The diversion of macromolecular synthesis in L-cells towards ends dictated by mengovirus (1964)
- Doctoral advisor: Richard Franklin
- Doctoral students: Sara Cherry; Howard Y. Chang

External videos
- Nobel Prize Interview with Dr. David Baltimore, 26 April 2001, Nobel Prize.org
- David Baltimore: Danger from the Wild: HIV, Can We Conquer It?, iBiology

David Baltimore (March 7, 1938 – September 6, 2025) was an American biologist, university administrator, and 1975 Nobel laureate in Physiology or Medicine. He was a professor of biology at the California Institute of Technology (Caltech), where he served as president from 1997 to 2006. He founded the Whitehead Institute and directed it from 1982 to 1990. In 2008, he served as president of the American Association for the Advancement of Science.

At age 37, Baltimore won the Nobel Prize with Renato Dulbecco and Howard M. Temin "for their discoveries concerning the interaction between tumour viruses and the genetic material of the cell", specifically the discovery of the enzyme reverse transcriptase. He contributed to immunology, virology, cancer research, biotechnology, and recombinant DNA research. He also trained many doctoral students and postdoctoral fellows, several of whom have gone on to notable and distinguished research careers. In addition to the Nobel Prize, he received a number of other awards, including the U.S. National Medal of Science in 1999 and the Lasker Award in 2021.

== Early life and education ==
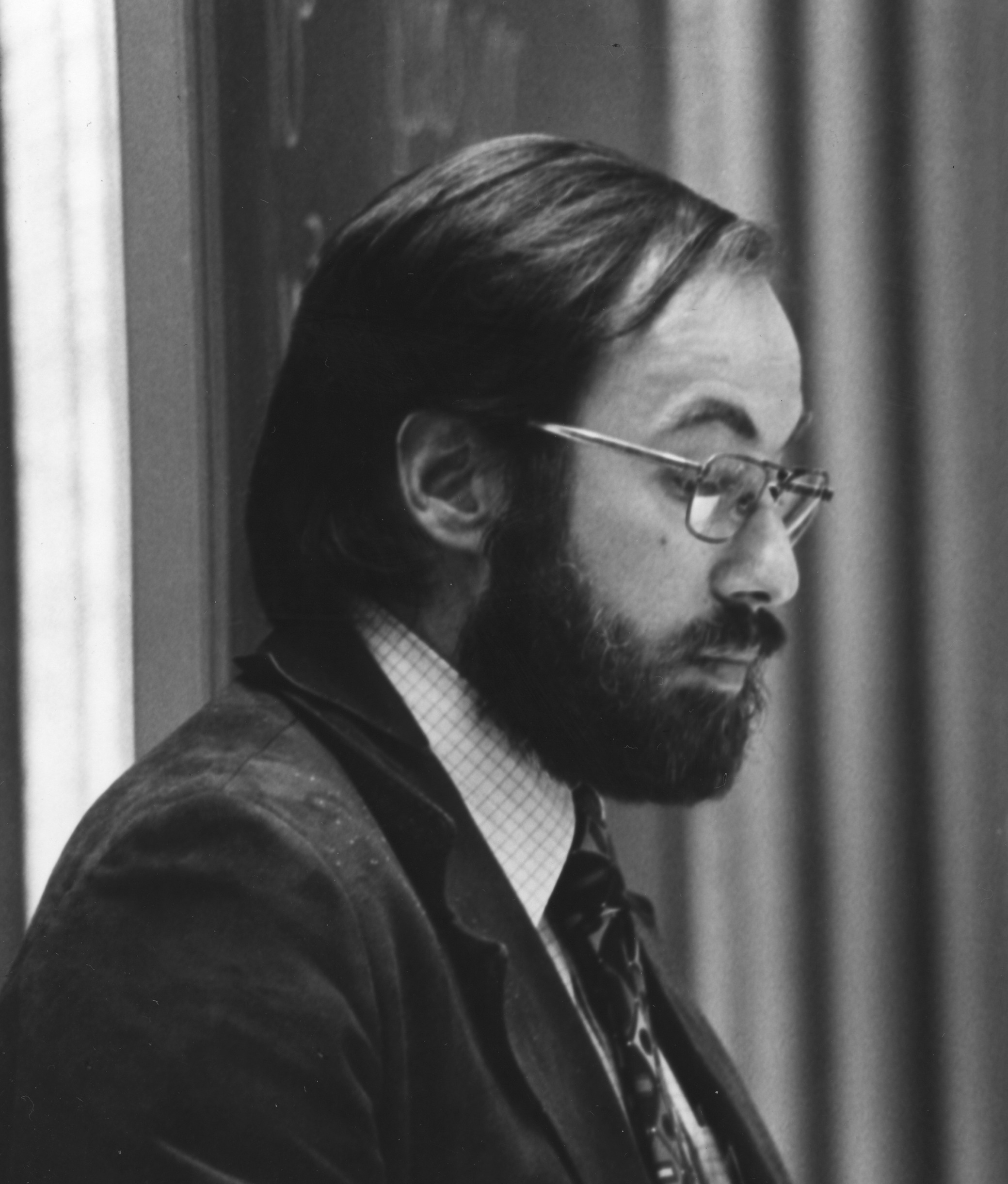
Baltimore in the 1970s

Baltimore was born on March 7, 1938, in Manhattan, New York, to Gertrude (Lipschitz) and Richard Baltimore. Raised in the Queens neighborhoods of Forest Hills and Rego Park, he moved with his family to suburban Great Neck, New York, while he was in second grade because his mother felt that the city schools were inadequate. His father had been raised as an Orthodox Jew and his mother was an atheist, and Baltimore observed Jewish holidays and would attend synagogue with his father through his Bar Mitzvah. He graduated from Great Neck North High School in 1956, and credits his interest in biology to a high-school summer spent at the Jackson Laboratory's Summer Student Program in Bar Harbor, Maine. It was at this program that he met Howard Temin, with whom he would later share the Nobel Prize.

Baltimore earned his bachelor's degree in chemistry with high honors at Swarthmore College in 1960. He was introduced to molecular biology by George Streisinger, under whose mentorship he worked for a summer at Cold Spring Harbor Laboratory as part of the inaugural cohort of the Undergraduate Research Program in 1959. There he also met two new MIT faculty, future Nobel Laureate Salvador Luria and Cyrus Levinthal, who were scouting for candidates for a new program of graduate education in molecular biology.

Luria and Levinthal invited Baltimore to apply to the Massachusetts Institute of Technology (MIT). Baltimore's future promise was evident in his work as a graduate student when he entered MIT's graduate program in biology in 1960. His early interest in phage genetics quickly yielded to a passion for animal viruses. He took the Cold Spring Harbor course on animal virology in 1961 and chose to move to Richard Franklin's lab at Rockefeller University to complete his PhD research on animal virology. There he made fundamental discoveries on virus replication and its effect on cell metabolism, including the first description of an RNA replicase, finishing his PhD in only two years.

== Career and research ==
After his PhD, Baltimore returned to MIT for postdoctoral research with James E. Darnell in 1963. He continued his work on virus replication using poliovirus and pursued training in enzymology with Jerard Hurwitz at Albert Einstein College of Medicine in 1964.

=== Independent investigator ===
In February 1965, Baltimore was recruited by Renato Dulbecco to the newly established Salk Institute for Biological Studies in La Jolla as an independent research associate. There he investigated poliovirus RNA replication and began a long and storied career of mentoring other scientists' early careers including Marc Girard, and Michael Jacobson. They discovered the mechanism of proteolytic cleavage of viral polyprotein precursors, pointing to the importance of proteolytic processing in the synthesis of eukaryotic proteins. He also met his future wife, Alice Huang, who began working with Baltimore at Salk in 1967. He and Alice together carried out key experiments on defective interfering particles and viral pseudo types. During this work, he made a key discovery that polio produced its viral proteins as a single large polyprotein that was subsequently processed into individual functional peptides.

=== Massachusetts Institute of Technology ===
==== Reverse transcriptase ====
In 1968, he was recruited once more by soon-to-be Nobel laureate Salvador Luria to the department of biology at MIT as an associate professor of microbiology. Alice S. Huang also moved to MIT to continue her research on vesicular stomatitis virus (VSV). They became a couple, and married in October 1968. At MIT, Huang, Baltimore, and graduate student Martha Stampfer discovered that VSV replication involved an RNA-dependent RNA polymerase within the virus particle, and used a novel strategy to replicate its RNA genome. VSV entered a host cell as a single negative strand of RNA, but brought with it RNA polymerase to stimulate the processes of transcription and replication of more RNA.

Baltimore extended this work and examined two RNA tumor viruses, Rauscher murine leukemia virus and Rous sarcoma virus. He went on to discover reverse transcriptase (RTase or RT) – the enzyme that polymerizes DNA from an RNA template. In doing so, he discovered a distinct class of viruses, later called retroviruses, that use an RNA template to catalyze synthesis of viral DNA. This overturned the simplified version of the central dogma of molecular biology that stated that genetic information flows unidirectionally from DNA to RNA to proteins. Reverse transcriptase is essential for the reproduction of retroviruses, allowing such viruses to turn viral RNA strands into viral DNA strands. The viruses that fall into this category include HIV.

The discovery of reverse transcriptase, made contemporaneously with Howard Temin, who had proposed the provirus hypothesis, showed that genetic information could traffic bidirectionally between DNA and RNA. They published these findings in back-to-back papers in the journal Nature. This discovery made it easier to isolate and reproduce individual genes, and was heralded as evidence that molecular and virological approaches to understanding cancer would yield new cancer treatments. This may have influenced President Richard Nixon's war on cancer, which was launched in 1971 and substantially increased research funding for the disease. In 1972, at the age of 34, Baltimore was awarded tenure as a professor of biology at MIT, a post that he held until 1997.

==== Asilomar conference on recombinant DNA ====
Baltimore also helped Paul Berg and Maxine Singer to organize the Asilomar Conference on Recombinant DNA, held in February 1975. The conference discussed possible dangers of new biotechnology, drew up voluntary safety guidelines, and issued a call for an ongoing moratorium on certain types of experiments and review of possible experiments, which has been institutionalized by recombinant DNA advisory committees established at essentially all US academic institutions conducting molecular biology research. Baltimore was well aware of the importance of the changes occurring in the laboratory: "The whole Asilomar process opened up to the world that modern biology had new powers that you had never conceived of before."

=== MIT Cancer Center ===
In 1973, he was awarded an American Cancer Society Professor of Microbiology that provided substantial salary support. Also in 1973, he became one of the early faculty members in the newly organized MIT Center for Cancer Research (CCR), capping a creative and industrious period of his career with nearly fifty research publications including the paradigm-shifting paper on reverse transcriptase. The MIT CCR was led by Salvador E. Luria and quickly achieved pre-eminence with a group of faculty including Baltimore, Phillips Robbins, Herman Eisen, Philip Sharp, and Robert Weinberg. Baltimore was honored as a Fellow of the American Academy of Arts and Sciences in 1974. He returned to New York City in 1975, for a year-long sabbatical at Rockefeller University working again with Jim Darnell.

=== Nobel Prize ===
In 1975, at the age of 37, he shared the Nobel Prize for Physiology or Medicine with Howard Temin and Renato Dulbecco. The citation reads, "for their discoveries concerning the interaction between tumor viruses and the genetic material of the cell." At the time, Baltimore's greatest contribution to virology was his discovery of reverse transcriptase (Rtase or RT) which is essential for the reproduction of retroviruses such as HIV and was discovered independently, and at about the same time, by Satoshi Mizutani and Temin.

After winning the Nobel Prize, Baltimore reorganized his laboratory, refocusing on immunology and virology, with immunoglobulin gene expression as a major area of interest. He tackled new problems such as the pathogenesis of Abelson murine leukemia virus (AMuLV), lymphocyte differentiation and related topic in immunology. In 1980, his group isolated the oncogene in AMuLV and showed it was a member of a new class of protein kinases that used the amino acid tyrosine as a phosphoacceptor. This type of enzymatic activity was also discovered by Tony Hunter, who has done extensive work in the area. He also continued to pursue fundamental questions in RNA viruses and in 1981, Baltimore and Vincent Racaniello, a post-doctoral fellow in his laboratory, used recombinant DNA technology to generate a plasmid encoding the genome of poliovirus, an animal RNA virus. The plasmid DNA was introduced into cultured mammalian cells and infectious poliovirus was produced. The infectious clone, DNA encoding the genome of a virus, is a standard tool used today in virology.

=== Whitehead Institute for Biomedical Research ===
In 1982, with a charitable donation by businessman and philanthropist Edwin C. "Jack" Whitehead, Baltimore was asked to help establish a self-governed research institute dedicated to basic biomedical research. Baltimore persuaded Whitehead that MIT would be the ideal home for the new institute, convinced that it would be superior at hiring the best researchers in biology at the time, thus ensuring quality. Persuading MIT faculty to support the idea was far more difficult. MIT as an institution had never housed another before, and concerns were raised that the wealth of the institute might skew the biology department in directions faculty did not wish to take, and that Baltimore himself would gain undue influence over hiring within the department. The controversy was made worse by an article published by the Boston Globe framing the institute as corporate takeover of MIT. After a year of intensive discussions and planning, faculty finally voted in favor of the institute. Whitehead, Baltimore, and the rest of the planning team devised a unique structure of an independent research institute composed of "members" with a close relationship with the department of biology of MIT. This structure continues to this day to attract an elite interactive group of faculty to the Department of Biology at MIT and has served as a model for other distinguished institutes such as the Broad Institute.

The Whitehead Institute for Biomedical Research (WIBR) was launched with $35 million to construct and equip a new building located across the street from the MIT cancer center at 9 Cambridge Center in Cambridge Massachusetts. The institute also received $5 million per year in guaranteed income and a substantial endowment in his will (for a total gift of $135 million). Under Baltimore's leadership, a distinguished group of founding members including Gerald Fink, Rudolf Jaenisch, Harvey Lodish, and Robert Weinberg was assembled and eventually grew to 20 members in disciplines ranging from immunology, genetics, and oncology to fundamental developmental studies in mice and fruit flies. Whitehead Institute's contributions to bioscience have long been consistently outstanding. Less than a decade after its founding with continued leadership by Baltimore, the Whitehead Institute was named the top research institution in the world in molecular biology and genetics, and over a recent 10-year period, papers published by Whitehead scientists, including many from Baltimore's own lab, were the most cited papers of any biological research institute. The Whitehead Institute was an important partner in the Human Genome Project.

Baltimore served as director of the WIBR and expanded the faculty and research areas into key areas of research including mouse and drosophila genetics. During this time, Baltimore's own research program thrived in the new Institute. Important breakthroughs from Baltimore's lab include the discovery of the key transcription factor NF-κB by Dr. Ranjan Sen and David Baltimore in 1986. This was part of a broader investigation to identify nuclear factors required for lg gene expression in B lymphocytes. However, NF-κB turned out to have much broader importance in both innate and adaptive immunity and viral regulation. NF-κB is involved in regulating cellular responses and belongs to the category of "rapid-acting" primary transcription factors. Their discovery led to an "information explosion" involving "one of the most intensely studied signaling paradigms of the last two decades."

As early as 1984, Rudolf Grosschedl and David Weaver, postdoctoral fellows, in Baltimore's laboratory, were experimenting with the creation of transgenic mice as a model for the study of disease. They suggested that "control of lg gene rearrangement might be the only mechanism that determines the specificity of heavy chain gene expression within the lymphoid cell lineage." in 1987, they created transgenic mice with the fused gene that developed fatal leukemia.

David G. Schatz and Marjorie Oettinger, as students in Baltimore's research group in 1988 and 1989, identified the protein pair that rearranges immunoglobulin genes, the recombination-activating gene RAG-1 and RAG-2. this was a key discovery in determining how the immune system can have specificity for a given molecule out of many possibilities, and was considered by Baltimore as of 2005 to be "our most significant discovery in immunology".

In 1990, as a student in David Baltimore's laboratory at MIT, George Q. Daley demonstrated that a fusion protein called bcr-abl is sufficient to stimulate cell growth and cause chronic myelogenous leukemia (CML). This work helped to identify a class of proteins that become hyperactive in specific types of cancer cells. It helped to lay the groundwork for a new type of drug, attacking cancer at the genetic level: Brian Druker's development of the anti-cancer drug Imatinib (Gleevec), which deactivates bcr-abl proteins. Gleevec has shown impressive results in treating chronic myelogenous leukemia and also promise in treating gastrointestinal stromal tumor (GIST).

=== Rockefeller University ===
Baltimore served as the director of the Whitehead Institute until July 1, 1990, when he was appointed the sixth president of Rockefeller University in New York City. He moved his research group to New York in stages and continued to make creative contributions to virology and cellular regulation. He also began important reforms in fiscal and faculty management and promoted the status of junior faculty at the university. After resigning on December 3, 1991 (see Imanishi-Kari case), Baltimore remained on the Rockefeller University faculty and continued research until the spring of 1994. He was invited to return to MIT and rejoined the faculty as the Ivan R. Cottrell Professor of Molecular Biology and Immunology.

=== California Institute of Technology ===
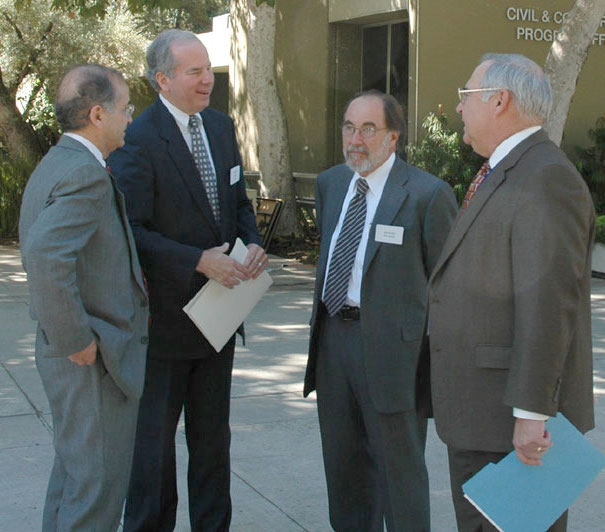
From left: JPL director Charles Elachi, La Canada-Flintridge mayor Greg Brown, Baltimore and JPL deputy director Eugene Tattini (2006)

On May 13, 1997, Baltimore was appointed president of the California Institute of Technology (Caltech). He began serving in the office October 15, 1997 and was inaugurated March 9, 1998.

During Baltimore's tenure at Caltech, United States president Bill Clinton awarded Baltimore the National Medal of Science in 1999 for his numerous contributions to the scientific world. In 2004, Rockefeller University gave Baltimore its highest honor, a Doctor of Science degree (honoris causa).

In 2003, as a postdoctoral fellow in Baltimore's lab at Caltech, Matthew Porteus was the first to demonstrate precise gene editing in human cells using chimeric nucleases.

In October 2005, Baltimore resigned the office of the president of Caltech, saying, "This is not a decision that I have made easily, but I am convinced that the interests of the Institute will be best served by a presidential transition at this particular time in its history ...". Former Georgia Tech Provost Jean-Lou Chameau succeeded Baltimore as president of Caltech. Baltimore was appointed president emeritus and the Robert Andrews Milikan Professor of Biology at Caltech and remained an active member of the institute's community. On January 21, 2021, Caltech president Thomas F. Rosenbaum announced the removal of the name of Caltech's founding president and first Nobel laureate, Robert A. Millikan, from campus buildings, assets, and honors due to Millikan's substantial participation in the eugenics movement. Baltimore's title was changed to "Distinguished Professor of Biology".

=== Caltech Laboratory (1997–2019) ===
Baltimore's laboratory at Caltech focused on two major research areas: understanding the development and functioning of the mammalian immune system and translational studies creating viral vectors to make the immune system more effective in resisting cancer. Their basic studies went in two directions: understanding the diverse activity of the NF-κB transcription factor, and understanding the normal and pathologic functions of microRNA.

==== Translational Science Initiatives ====
A primary focus of Baltimore's lab was use of gene therapy methods to treat HIV and cancer. In the early 2000s one of Baltimore's graduate students, Lili Yang, developed a lentivirus vector that allowed for the cloning of genes for two chains of TCR. Recognizing its potentially profound implications for enhancing immunity, Baltimore developed a translational research initiative within his laboratory called "Engineering Immunity." The Bill and Melinda Gates Foundation awarded the program with a Grand Challenge Grant, and he used the funding to divide the initiative into four research programs and hire additional lab staff to lead each one. Two of the research programs sparked gene therapy start-up companies, Calimmune and Immune Design Corp, founded in 2006 and 2008 respectively. A third program focused on the development of an HIV vaccine, and eventually lead to clinical trials at NIH. In 2009 Baltimore became director of the Joint Center for Translational Medicine, a shared initiative between Caltech and UCLA aimed at developing bench to bedside medicine.

==== MicroRNA Research ====
A focus of Baltimore's lab from his arrival at Caltech to the lab's closure in 2018 was understanding the role of microRNA in the immune system. MicroRNAs provide fine control over gene expression by regulating the amount of protein made by particular messenger RNAs. In recent research led by Jimmy Zhao, Baltimore's team has discovered a small RNA molecule called microRNA-146a (miR-146a) and bred a strain of mice that lacks miR146a. They have used the miR146a(-) mice as a model to study the effects of chronic inflammation on the activity of hematopoietic stem cells (HSCs). Their results suggest that microRNA-146a protects HSCs during chronic inflammation, and that its lack may contribute to blood cancers and bone marrow failure.

===== Splicing Control Research =====
Another concentration within Baltimore's lab in recent years was control of inflammatory and immune responses, specifically splicing control of gene expression after inflammatory stimuli. In 2013 they discovered that ordered expression of genes following an inflammatory stimulus was controlled by splicing, not transcription as previously supposed. This led to further discoveries that delayed splicing was caused by introns, with the revelation that RNA-binding protein BUD13 acts at this intron to increase the amount of successful splicing (2 articles by Luke Frankiw published in 2019 and 2020).

In an autobiographical piece published in Annual Review Immunology in 2019, Baltimore announced that half of his lab space at Caltech would be taken over by a new assistant professor in Fall 2018, and his current lab group would be the last. "I have been involved in research for 60 years, and I think it is time to leave the field to younger people."

=== Public policy ===
In the span of his career, Baltimore profoundly influenced national science policy debates, including the AIDS epidemic and recombinant DNA research. His efforts to organize the Asilomar Conference on Recombinant DNA were key to creating consensus within scientific and policy spheres.

In recent years, Baltimore joined with other scientists to call for a worldwide moratorium on use of a new genome-editing technique to alter inheritable human DNA. A key step enabling researchers to slice up any DNA sequence they choose was developed by Emmanuelle Charpentier, then at Umea University in Sweden, and Jennifer A. Doudna of the University of California, Berkeley. Reminiscent of the Asilomar conference on recombinant DNA in 1975, those involved want both scientists and the public to be more aware of the ethical issues and risks involved with new techniques for genome modification.

An early spokesperson for federal funding for AIDS research, Baltimore co-chaired the 1986 National Academy of Sciences committee on a National Strategy for AIDS. In 1986, he and Sheldon M. Wolff were invited by the National Academy of Sciences and the Institute of Medicine to coauthor an independent report: Confronting AIDS (1986), in which they called for a $1 billion research program for HIV/AIDS. As of 1996 he was appointed head of the National Institutes of Health (NIH) AIDS Vaccine Research Committee (AVRC).

=== Biotechnology ===
Baltimore held nearly 100 different biotechnology patents in the US and Europe, and had been preeminent in American biotechnology since the 1970s. In addition to Calimmune and Immune Design, he also helped found s2A Molecular, Inc. He consulted at various companies including Collaborative Research, Bristol Myers Squibb, and most recently Virtualitics. He served on the board of directors at several companies and non-profit institutions including Regulus Therapeutics and Appia Bio. He was also a member of numerous Scientific Advisory Boards, and served with PACT Pharma, Volastra Therapeutics, Vir Biotechnology, and the Center for Infectious Diseases Research at Westlake University. He was the principal scientific advisor for the Science Philanthropy Alliance.

=== Awards and legacy ===
Baltimore's honors included the 1970 Gustave Stern Award in Virology, 1971 Eli Lilly and Co. Award in Microbiology or Immunology, 1999 National Medal of Science, and 2000 Warren Alpert Foundation Prize. He was elected to the National Academy of Sciences USA (NAS) in1974; the American Academy of Arts and Sciences, 1974; the NAS Institute of Medicine (IOM), 1974; the American Association of Immunologists, 1984; the American Philosophical Society, 1997. He was elected a Foreign Member of the Royal Society (ForMemRS) in 1987; the French Academy of Sciences, 2000; and the American Association for Cancer Research (AACR). He was also a member of the Pontifical Academy of Sciences, 1978. In 2008, Baltimore was president of the American Association for the Advancement of Science (AAAS).

He published over 700 peer-reviewed articles.

Baltimore was a member of the USA Science and Engineering Festival's Advisory Board and an Xconomist (an editorial advisor for the tech news and media company, Xconomy). Baltimore also served on The Jackson Laboratory's board of trustees, the Bulletin of the Atomic Scientists' Board of Sponsors, Amgen, Inc.'s board of directors, and numerous other organizations and their boards.

In 2019 Caltech named a graduate fellowship program in biochemistry and molecular biophysics in honor of Baltimore. The program combined a $7.5 million gift from the Amgen Foundation with an existing one-year Amgen fellowship and $3.75 million given by Caltech's Gordon and Betty Moore Graduate Fellowship Match.

== Controversies ==
=== Imanishi-Kari case ===
During the late 1980s and early 1990s, Thereza Imanishi-Kari, a scientist who was in a separate, independent, laboratory at MIT but who had collaborated with Baltimore, was implicated in a case of scientific fraud. The case received extensive news coverage and a Congressional investigation. The case was linked to Baltimore's name because of his scientific collaboration with and later his strong defense of Imanishi-Kari against accusations of fraud.

In 1986, while a professor of biology at MIT and director at Whitehead, Baltimore co-authored a scientific paper on immunology with Thereza Imanishi-Kari (an assistant professor of biology who had her own laboratory at MIT) as well as four others. A postdoctoral fellow in Imanishi-Kari's laboratory, Margot O'Toole, who was not an author, reported concerns about the paper, ultimately accusing Imanishi-Kari of fabricating data in a cover-up. Baltimore, however, refused to retract the paper.

O'Toole soon dropped her challenge, but the NIH, which had funded the contested paper's research, began investigating, at the insistence of Walter W. Stewart, a self-appointed fraud buster, and Ned Feder, his lab head at the NIH. Representative John Dingell (D-MI) also aggressively pursued it, eventually calling in U.S. Secret Service (USSS; U.S. Treasury) document examiners.

Around October 1989, when Baltimore was appointed president of Rockefeller University, around a third of the faculty opposed his appointment because of concerns about his behaviour in the Imanishi-Kari case. He visited every laboratory, one by one, to hear those concerns directly from each group of researchers.

In a draft report dated March 14, 1991, based mainly on USSS forensics findings, NIH's fraud unit, then called the Office of Scientific Integrity (OSI), accused Imanishi-Kari of falsifying and fabricating data. It also criticized Baltimore for failing to embrace O'Toole's challenge. Less than a week later, the report was leaked to the press. Baltimore and three co-authors then retracted the paper; however, Imanishi-Kari and Moema H. Reis did not sign the retraction. In the report, Baltimore stated that he may have been "too willing to accept" Imanishi-Kari's explanations and felt he "did too little to seek an independent verification of her data and conclusions." Baltimore publicly apologized for not taking a whistle-blower's charge more seriously.

Amid concerns raised by negative publicity in connection with the scandal, Baltimore resigned as president of Rockefeller University and rejoined the MIT Biology faculty.

In July 1992, the US Attorney for the District of Maryland, who had been investigating the case, announced he would not bring criminal or civil charges against Imanishi-Kari. In October 1994, however, OSI's successor, the Office of Research Integrity (ORI; HHS) found Imanishi-Kari guilty on 19 counts of research misconduct, basing its conclusions largely on Secret Service analysis of laboratory notebooks, relying on forensic analysis of the paperwork, data and ink, rather than the scientific experiments described within.

An HHS appeals panel began meeting in June 1995 to review all charges in detail. In June 1996, the panel ruled that the ORI had failed to prove any of its 19 charges. After throwing out much of the documentary evidence gathered by the ORI, the panel dismissed all charges against Imanishi-Kari. As their final report stated, the HHS panel "found that much of what ORI presented was irrelevant, had limited probative value, was internally inconsistent, lacked reliability or foundation, was not credible or not corroborated, or was based on unwarranted assumptions." It did conclude that "The Cell paper as a whole is rife with errors of all sorts ... [including] some which, despite all these years and layers of review, have never previously been pointed out or corrected. Responsibility ... must be shared by all participants." Neither OSI nor ORI ever accused Baltimore of research misconduct. The reputations of Stewart and Feder, who had pushed for the investigation, were badly damaged. The pair were reassigned to other positions at NIH because they failed to maintain productivity in their roles as scientists and questions were raised about the legitimacy of their self-appointed inquiries into scientific integrity.

The Imanishi-Kari controversy was one among several prominent scientific integrity cases of the 1980s and 1990s in the United States. In nearly all cases, defendants were ultimately cleared. The case profoundly impacted the process for handling of scientific misconduct in the United States. Baltimore has been both defended and criticized for his actions in this matter. In 1993, Yale University mathematician Serge Lang strongly criticized Baltimore's behavior. Historian of science Daniel Kevles, writing after the exoneration of Imanishi-Kari, recounted the affair in his 1998 book, The Baltimore Case. Horace Freeland Judson also gives a critical assessment of Baltimore's actions in The Great Betrayal: Fraud In Science. Baltimore also wrote his own analysis.

=== Luk van Parijs case ===
In 2005, at Baltimore's request, Caltech began investigating the work that Luk van Parijs had conducted while a postdoc in Baltimore's laboratory. Van Parijs first came under suspicion at MIT, for work done after he had left Baltimore's lab. After van Parijs had been fired by MIT, his doctoral supervisor also noted problems with work van Parijs did at the Brigham and Women's Hospital, before leaving Harvard to go to Baltimore's lab. The Caltech investigation concluded in March 2007. It found van Parijs alone committed research misconduct, and that four papers co-authored by Baltimore, van Parijs, and others required correction.

=== COVID-19 and lab-leak theory ===
In May 2021, Baltimore was quoted in the Bulletin of the Atomic Scientists in an article about the origins of the COVID-19 virus, saying, "When I first saw the furin cleavage site in the viral sequence, with its arginine codons, I said to my wife it was the smoking gun for the origin of the virus. These features make a powerful challenge to the idea of a natural origin for SARS2." This quote was widely shared and gave credence to the possibility of a Wuhan lab leak that has been discussed extensively as part of investigations into the origin of COVID-19.

A month later, Baltimore told the Los Angeles Times that he "should have softened the phrase 'smoking gun' because I don't believe that it proves the origin of the furin cleavage site but it does sound that way. I believe that the question of whether the sequence was put in naturally or by molecular manipulation is very hard to determine but I wouldn't rule out either origin."

== Personal life and death ==
Baltimore married Alice S. Huang in 1968. They had one daughter. Baltimore was an avid fly-fisher.

Baltimore died from cancer at his home in Woods Hole, Massachusetts, on September 6, 2025, at the age of 87.

== Awards and honors ==
- 1971 First recipient of the Gustav Stern Award in Virology
- 1971 Warren Triennial Prize
- 1971 Eli Lilly Award in Immunology and Microbiology
- 1974 Fellow of the American Academy of Arts and Sciences
- 1974 NAS Award in Molecular Biology
- 1974 Canada Gairdner International Award
- 1975 Nobel Prize in Physiology or Medicine
- 1983 EMBO Member
- 1986 Golden Plate Award of the American Academy of Achievement
- 1999 National Medal of Science
- 2000 Warren Alpert Foundation Prize
- 2021 Lasker-Koshland Special Achievement Award in Medical Science

=== Honorary degrees ===
- 1976 Swarthmore College, Swarthmore, PA
- 1987 Mount Holyoke College, So. Hadley, MA
- 1990 Mount Sinai Medical Center, New York, NY
- 1990 Bard College, Annandale-on-Hudson, NY
- 1990 University of Helsinki, Helsinki, Finland
- 1998 Weizmann Institute of Science, Israel
- 1999 Cold Spring Harbor Laboratory, Cold Spring Harbor, NY
- 1999 University of Alabama, Birmingham, AL
- 2001 California Polytechnic State University, San Luis Obispo, CA
- 2004 Columbia University, New York, NY
- 2004 Yale University, New Haven, CT
- 2004 The Rockefeller University, New York, NY
- 2005 Harvard University, Cambridge, MA
- 2012 University of Buenos Aires, Buenos Aires, Argentina

== Books ==
Luria, S. E., J.E. Darnell, D. Baltimore and A. Campbell (1978) General Virology 3rd edition John Wiley and Sons, New York, New York.

Darnell, J., H. Lodish and D. Baltimore (1986) Molecular Cell Biology, Scientific American, New York, New York.

== See also ==
- History of RNA biology
- List of Jewish Nobel laureates
- List of RNA biologists
- Baltimore classification
- 73079 Davidbaltimore

Academic offices
Preceded by Joshua Lederberg	6th President of Rockefeller University; 1990–1991	Succeeded by Torsten Wiesel
Preceded by Thomas Eugene Everhart	6th President of the California Institute of Technology; 1997–2005	Succeeded by Jean-Lou Chameau
