= Lloyd M. Kozloff =

American microbiologist and virologist

- Born: 1923; Chicago, Illinois, US
- Died: March 10, 2012; Fort Bragg, California, US
- Education: University of Chicago
- Scientific career
- Fields: Microbiology, virology
- Institutions: University of Chicago; University of Colorado Health Sciences Center; University of California, San Francisco
- Doctoral advisor: Earl Evans
- Notable students: Igor Gamow

Lloyd Mordecai Kozloff (1923–2012) was an American microbiologist and virologist. He served on the faculty of the University of Chicago, the University of Colorado Health Sciences Center, and University of California, San Francisco, where he became dean of the UCSF Graduate Division. Kozloff retired from UCSF in 1993. He died of heart failure in 2012.

== Early life and education ==
Kozloff was born on October 15, 1923 in Chicago. After finishing high school early, he attended University of Chicago and graduated with a degree in biochemistry at age 19. He served in the United States Navy for a time, then returned to Chicago for his Ph.D., which he received in 1948 for work with Earl Evans.

== Academic career ==
Kozloff was offered a faculty position in the Division of Biological Sciences at University of Chicago following the completion of his Ph.D., and he remained at the school until 1963, when he moved to the University of Colorado Health Sciences Center. While there he served as co-founding editor of the Journal of Virology, launched in 1967 under the leadership of Kozloff, Norman Salzman, and founding editor-in-chief Robert R. Wagner. In 1980 Kozloff moved again to University of California, San Francisco, where he served as the dean of the Graduate Division from 1981 to 1991. He retired in 1993. In recognition of his interest in graduate student education, a graduate fellowship was established in his name.

== Research ==
Kozloff's research in virology concentrated on bacteriophages, or viruses that infect bacteria; he was part of the network of scientists studying similar problems known at the time as the "phage group". Kozloff was particularly interested in the biochemistry of viral replication and was among the early users of radiolabeling to trace this process. While at Chicago, Kozloff and Frank Putnam reported the then-surprising discovery that a fraction of the phosphorus found in the DNA of a bacteriophage virus would be incorporated into the phage's progeny; this observation was important evidence in establishing the genetic role of DNA. While in Colorado, Kozloff developed a new research interest in ice-nucleating bacteria.

== Personal life ==
Kozloff and his wife had four children; his daughter Sarah Kozloff is a professor of film at Vassar College. Kozloff died of heart failure on March 10, 2012 at age 88.
