= Earl Evans (scientist) =

- Born: Earl Alison Evans; March 11, 1910; Baltimore
- Died: October 5, 1999 (aged 89); Chicago
- Known for: Antibody labeling for studying DNA
- Scientific career
- Fields: Biochemistry
- Institutions: University of Chicago

Earl Alison Evans (March 11, 1910 – October 5, 1999) was the chairman of the biochemistry department at the University of Chicago for 30 years, during which time he pioneered several techniques whose use is now widespread.

Evans was born in Baltimore, Maryland. In 1940 he collaborated with Louis Slotin in using the university's cyclotron to produce enough carbon-11 and carbon-14 for early studies in radiobiology. This led to his demonstration that animal cells are capable of fixing carbon dioxide to synthesize carbohydrates, a work which earned him both the 1941 Eli Lilly Award, and in 1942, the chairmanship of the department.

During the Second World War, Evans worked for the US Government developing new treatments for malaria, and in 1947 he was named scientific attaché to the American Embassy in London.

He returned to Chicago in 1948 and began reconstructing the university's biochemistry department in the wake of the war. To this end, he hired several talented biochemists, including Elwood Jensen, Albert Lehninger, Eugene Kennedy, Hans Gaffron, and future Nobel Laureate Konrad Bloch. As part of the phage group, Evans hired fellow members Lloyd Kozloff and Frank Putnam, with whom he established the use of bacteriophages and antibody labeling for studying DNA.

Evans died, aged 89, in Chicago. Donald Steiner described him as an "excellent scientist", saying that his work was "groundbreaking".
