= Judy Lieberman =

American professor of pediatrics

- Born: 1947 (age 78–79); Boston, Massachusetts
- Education: Harvard College; Rockefeller University; Harvard University
- Awards: Pew Scholar 1991–1995; National Academy of Sciences 2020
- Scientific career
- Fields: Pediatrics; molecular medicine
- Workplaces: Tufts University; Harvard University; Boston Children's Hospital

Judy Lieberman is a professor of pediatrics at Harvard Medical School and holds an endowed chair in cellular and molecular medicine at Boston Children's Hospital.

== Early life ==
Judy Lieberman was born in September 1947, in Boston, Massachusetts, and grew up in New Jersey with her parents and two sisters Phyllis and Donna.

Lieberman received a bachelor's degree from Harvard College in physics in 1969, a PhD from The Rockefeller University in theoretical physics in 1974, and an MD from Harvard University in 1981. She then did a residency in Internal Medicine and a fellowship in hematology-oncology at Tufts University School of Medicine's New England Medical Center where she did research in Sheldon M. Wolff's lab. She then returned to Harvard to work at Harvard’s Center for Blood Research.

== Career ==
In 1986, she joined the faculty at Tufts as an instructor of internal medicine. From 1987 to 1995, she was an assistant professor. In 1996, she moved to Harvard University, where she was an assistant professor of pediatrics.

Research in the Lieberman lab focuses on immunotherapy, cellular-based therapies, and RNA interference. This research has aided in the creation of 5 FDA approved drugs that attempt to alter gene expression in immune and cancer cells.

From 1991 to 1995, she was a Pew Scholar in the Biomedical Sciences. She was elected to the National Academy of Sciences in 2020. In 2025, Lieberman was made a Fellow of the American Academy of Microbiology.

== Personal life ==
Lieberman married Edward Greer while in graduate school. She had her first child while in medical school and her second during her residency.
