= G. Wayne Clough =

President Emeritus of the Georgia Institute of Technology (born 1941)

Gerald Wayne Clough
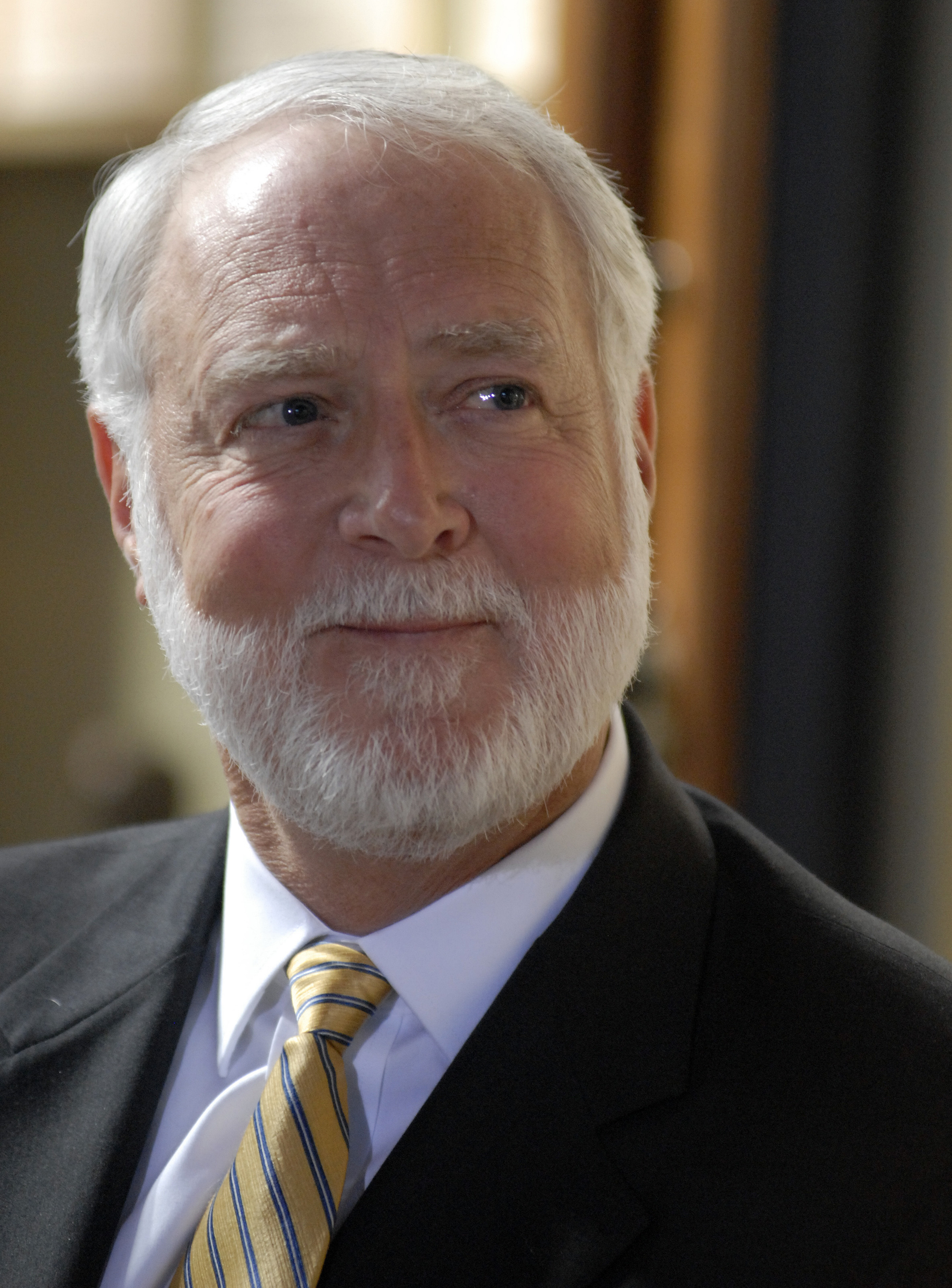
- Clough in 2008

12th Secretary of the Smithsonian Institution
- In office July 2008 – December 2014
- Preceded by: Lawrence M. Small
- Succeeded by: David J. Skorton

10th President of the Georgia Institute of Technology
- In office 1994–2008
- Preceded by: John Crecine
- Succeeded by: George P. Peterson

Personal details
- Born: September 24, 1941 (age 85) Douglas, Georgia, U.S.
- Spouse: Anne Robinson (deceased)
- Education: Georgia Institute of Technology (BS, MS); University of California, Berkeley (PhD)
- Known for: Civil engineering (geotechnical and earthquake engineering)
- Awards: Norman Medals (1987, 1996); George Westinghouse Award (1986); National Science Board (2004)
- Scientific career
- Fields: Civil engineering
- Workplaces: Stanford University; Virginia Tech; University of Washington; Georgia Institute of Technology; Smithsonian Institution
- Thesis: Finite element analyses of soil-structures interaction in U-frame locks (1969)
- Doctoral advisor: James M. Duncan
- Other academic advisors: Aleksandar S. Vesic
- Doctoral students: Jean-Lou Chameau

Gerald Wayne Clough (/ˈklʌf/; born September 24, 1941) is an American civil engineer and educator who is President Emeritus of the Georgia Institute of Technology (Georgia Tech) and former Secretary of the Smithsonian Institution. A graduate of Georgia Tech in civil engineering, he was the first alumnus to serve as President of the Institute.

The Clough Undergraduate Learning Commons, which officially opened its doors in August 2011, is named in his honor. Clough has garnered many other awards and honors, including the title of President Emeritus, two Norman Medals, eight honorary degrees, and membership in the National Science Board.

== Personal life and education ==
Clough was born on September 24, 1941, in Douglas, Georgia, the youngest of three children born to Daniel and Bessie (née Johnson) Clough. Clough's parents ran the local ice and coal plant. After electricity spread to south Georgia, the family moved to Chattanooga, Tennessee, where Clough attended City High School. Clough also met his future wife, Anne Olivia Robinson, during this time. They have two children, Eliza and Matthew.

Clough entered Georgia Tech in 1959 and earned a bachelor's degree in civil engineering in 1964. While an undergraduate at Georgia Tech, Clough participated in the cooperative education program, and was, against his wishes, a surveyor for a railroad company. Clough was a member of Georgia Tech's chapter of the Phi Gamma Delta fraternity, and lived in their fraternity house on North Avenue for half a year. Clough originally planned to receive only a bachelor's degree; however, the faculty encouraged him to pursue a graduate degree, so he continued his education and received his master's degree in civil engineering in 1965. In 1969, Clough received a Ph.D. in civil engineering from the University of California, Berkeley, with the thesis "Finite element analyses of soil-structures interaction in U-frame locks".

== Research ==
After earning his doctorate, Clough began his academic career as an assistant professor at Duke University in 1969. He joined the faculty at Stanford University in 1974 first as an associate professor and then later as full professor. In 1982, he joined the faculty of Virginia Tech as a professor of civil engineering and served as head of their Department of Civil Engineering for seven years. In 1990, Clough became dean of the Virginia Tech College of Engineering. Clough continued his research and instruction of graduate students at Virginia Tech in addition to his administrative responsibilities. Clough's research focused on geotechnical engineering, including earthquake studies, numerical analysis, soil structure interaction, in-situ testing, and underground openings. In 1993, he became provost and vice president for academic affairs at the University of Washington. Clough cofounded the United States Universities Council of Geotechnical Engineering Research (USUCGER), and served as the organization's first president during 1993.

== President of Georgia Tech ==
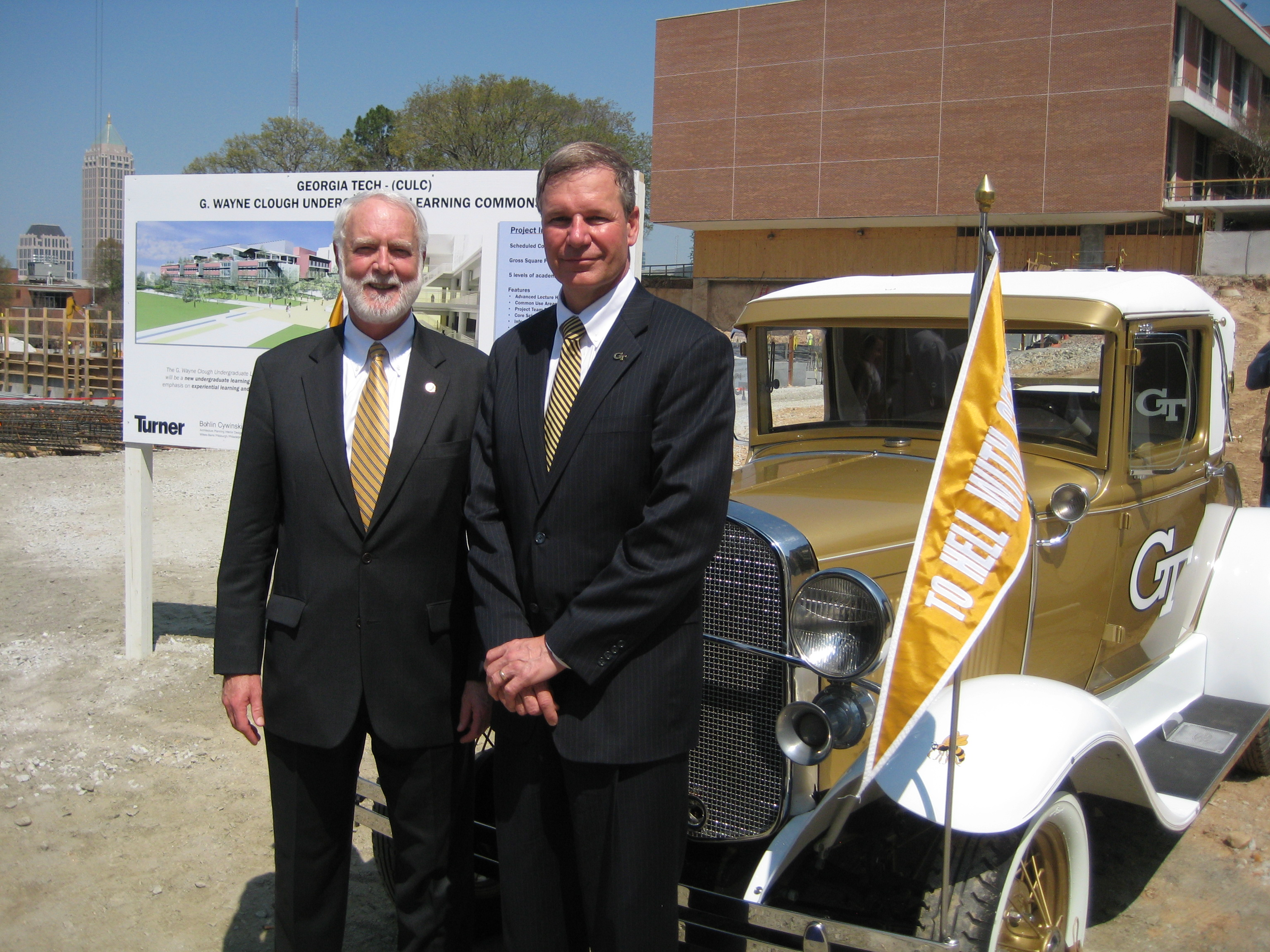
Clough Undergraduate Learning Commons in 2010.

On September 1, 1994, Clough became the first Georgia Tech alumnus to serve as the President of the Institute, succeeding John Patrick Crecine, and was in office during the 1996 Summer Olympics. In 1998, he separated the Ivan Allen College of Management, Policy, and International Affairs into the Ivan Allen College of Liberal Arts and the College of Management, which he returned to independent status. This separation was a major organizational change that built upon the large (and controversial) reorganization of the institute by Clough's predecessor.

Tech also received the Hesburgh Award for support of undergraduate teaching and learning, and the Institute's U.S. News & World Report rankings steadily improved.

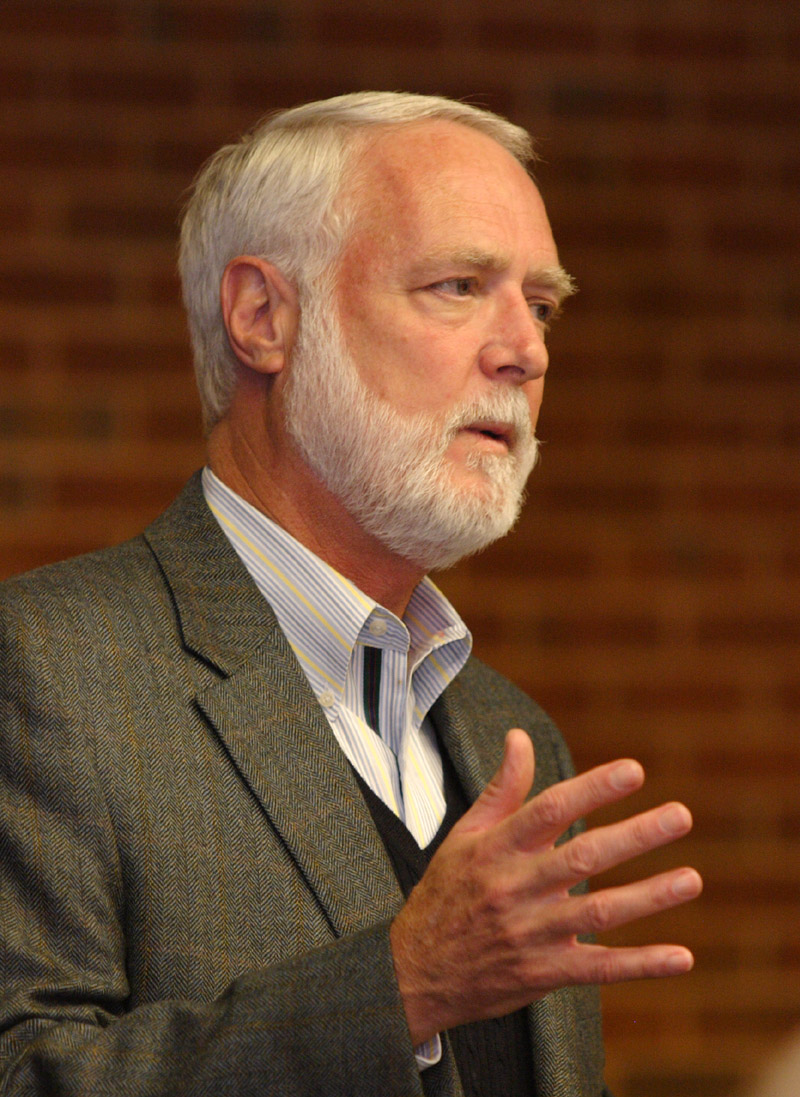
Clough at a 2005 student meeting

Clough's tenure was especially focused on a dramatic expansion of the Institute; more than $1 billion was spent on projects to expand or improve the campus. These projects included the completion of several west campus dorms, the manufacturing complex, 10th and Home, Technology Square, The Biomedical Complex, the Student Center renovation, the expanded 5th Street Bridge, the Aquatic Center's renovation into the Georgia Tech Campus Recreation Center, a new Health Center, the Klaus Advanced Computing Building, and the Nanotechnology Research Center.

Clough also spearheaded research opportunities for undergraduate students, later known as the Undergraduate Research Opportunities Program (UROP), the creation of an International Plan, and the creation of a fund to make Georgia Tech more affordable for low-income students (the G. Wayne Clough Georgia Tech Promise Program). The students of Georgia Tech affectionately dubbed him "Funk Masta G. Wayne" during his presidency due to the expansion and growth he encouraged in urban Atlanta, and he was generally known to have a warm and friendly disposition and a distinctive beard.

In 2006, members of Georgia Tech's college Republican club sued Georgia Tech, aided by the Alliance Defense Fund, in a case known as Sklar v. Clough that lasted until April 2008. The students won this case and Georgia Tech was forced to drop their speech code which was deemed unconstitutional and pay the defendants court costs.

Clough stepped down after almost fourteen years as President on July 1, 2008, which he previously announced in an email to students and staff on March 15, 2008.

== Secretary of the Smithsonian Institution ==
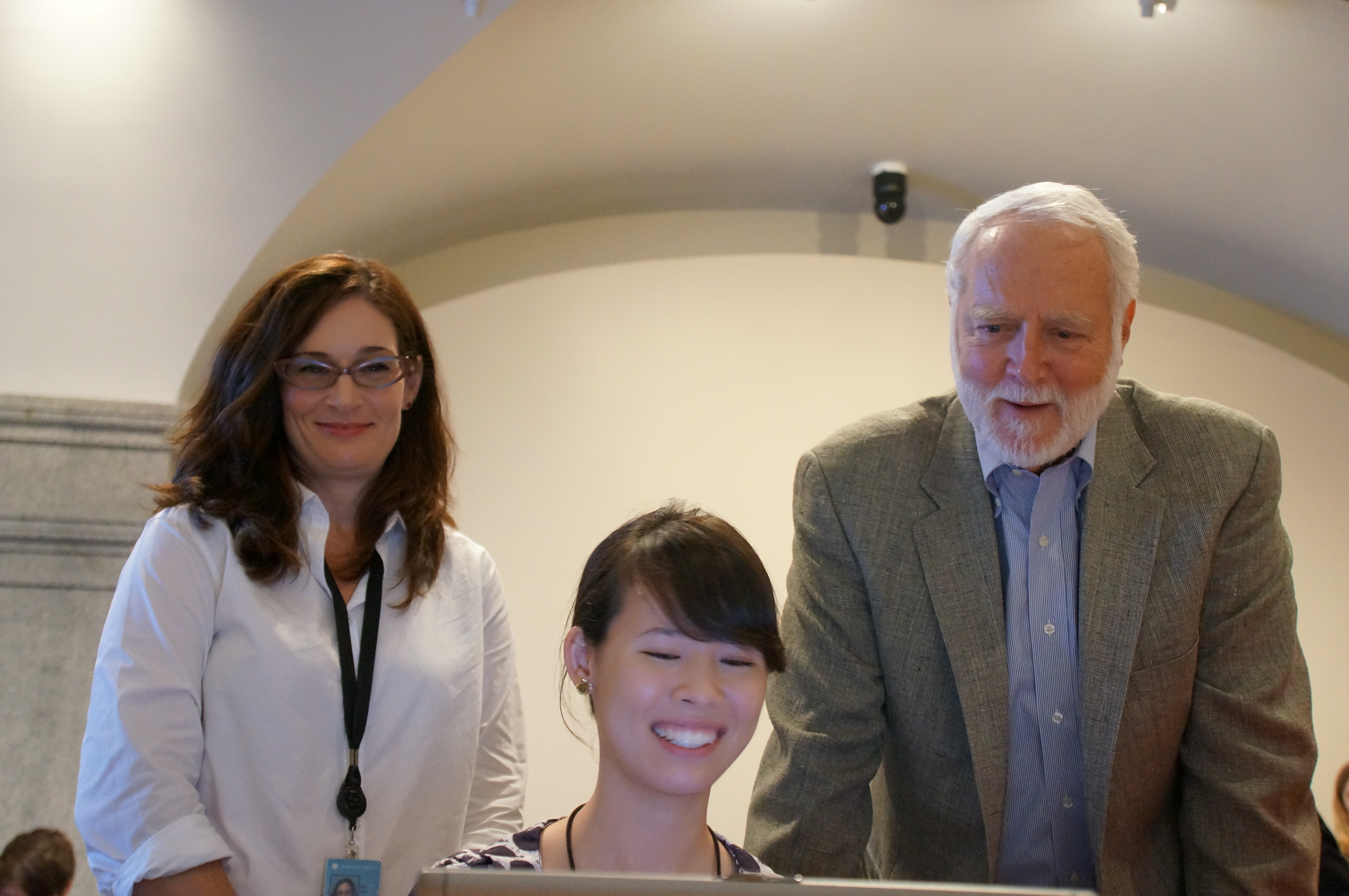
2013 Luce Lunder Editathon

On January 1, 2008, the Smithsonian named a search committee for the position of Secretary. Clough's primary competition for the position was Acting Secretary Cristián Samper, who had replaced Secretary Lawrence M. Small after Small's resignation in 2007. The Smithsonian's board of regents, whose duties include electing the Smithsonian's secretary, took at least two votes in the Lawyers' Lounge at the U.S. Supreme Court to arrive at their decision.

Clough was elected the 12th Secretary of the Smithsonian Institution; he was notified via a phone call with regents chairman Roger W. Sant on the afternoon of March 14, 2008. This decision was announced publicly at a press conference held at the Smithsonian Castle on March 15, 2008. Clough assumed office on July 1, 2008, and was officially installed in an academic ceremony on January 26, 2009. His starting salary as Secretary was $490,000, a pay cut from his final compensation package at Georgia Tech ($551,186) and significantly lower than his predecessor, Lawrence Small's annual salary of $900,000.

Upon assumption of his office, Clough made plans to digitize the Museum's collections, and offer more intensive K-12 educational programming. In November 2008, for the first time, the Smithsonian opened a board meeting to the public. He also made efforts to improve the Smithsonian's facilities and long-term planning, as well as plans to reorganize and cut back on staff and budget. In February 2012, Clough's travel expenses were probed by senator Charles E. Grassley, despite increased controls; Clough's travel had to be approved by the Smithsonian's chief financial officer as part of the reforms enacted in the wake of alleged abuses by Secretary Small.

On November 30, 2010, Secretary Clough made the decision to remove the David Wojnarowicz video A Fire in My Belly from the National Portrait Gallery's "Hide/Seek: Difference and Desire in American Portraiture" exhibition. The video artwork was perceived by some to be anti-Christian and Clough believed it detracted from the entirety of the exhibition, which he said was "to be a powerful exhibit about the contributions of gay and lesbian artists" and not about "religious iconography" and "desecration". This decision was widely criticized, but Clough responded that he was protecting the Smithsonian's larger educational mission. After the controversy, the Smithsonian's board of regents appointed an outside panel to examine the decision to remove the work from the exhibition; the panel recommended that art not be removed from shows that have already opened.

On September 18, 2013, after six years as Secretary, Clough announced his retirement, which would be effective October 2014. In announcing his retirement, he said, "When I became Secretary in 2008, I believed strongly that the Smithsonian had enormous untapped potential, especially in digital technology, to reach millions of people and serve as a resource for those who cannot visit Washington. I am confident that with our initiatives underway in bioconservation, education, digitization and fundraising, this is the right time to announce my plans for next fall so that an orderly transition can begin."

== Honors and awards ==
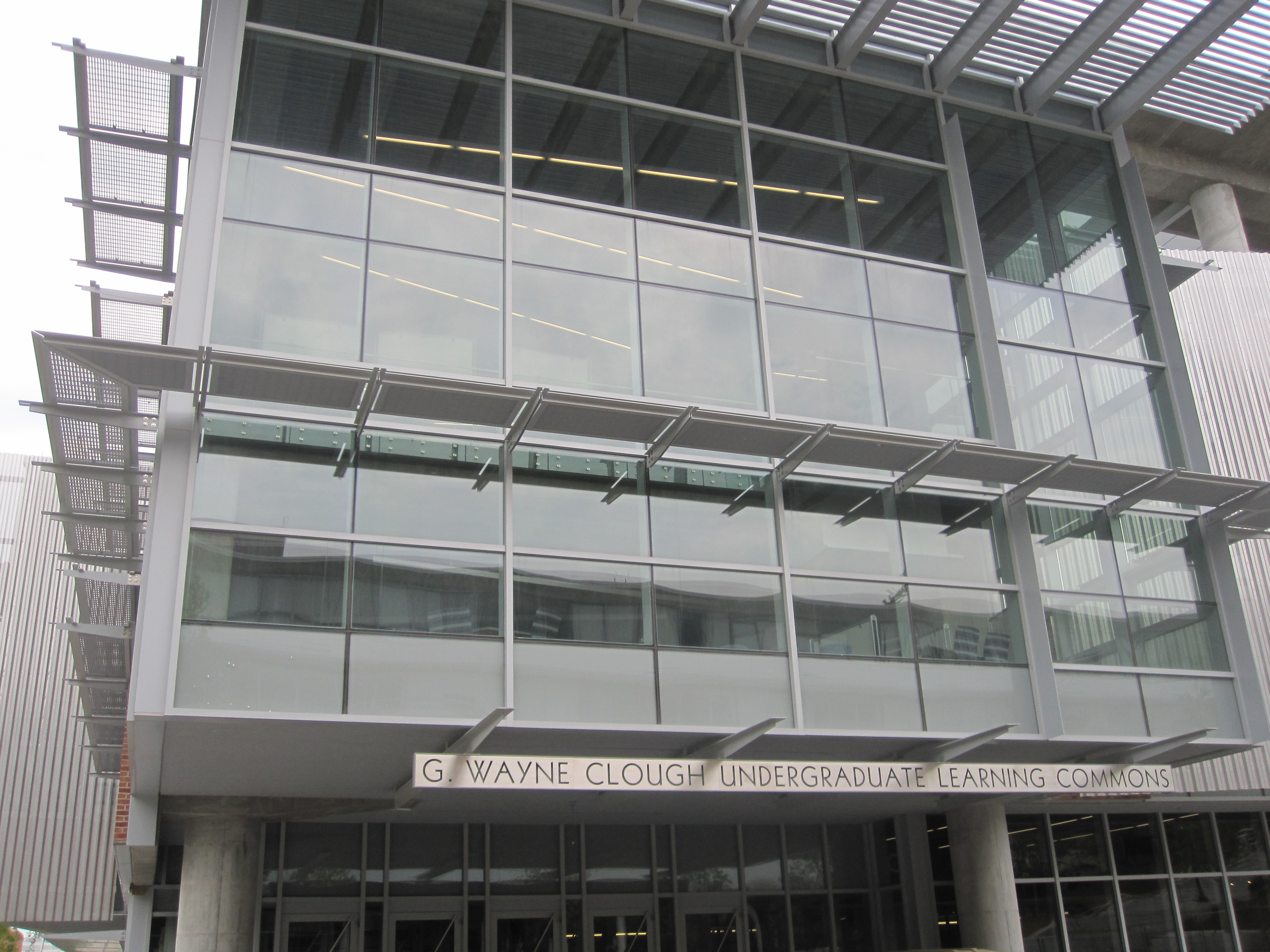
Clough Undergraduate Learning Commons

Clough has earned numerous awards and honors during his career. In his early career, he earned two Norman Medals, the State of the Art Award, and the Karl von Terzaghi Lectureship in 1994. Clough has also earned a George Westinghouse Award from the American Society for Engineering Education. He was elected a member of the National Academy of Engineering in 1990 for developing and verifying advanced design and analysis procedures for soil-structure interaction problems. At NAE, he served as a chair of one of its summits in 2004, The Engineer of 2020: Visions of Engineering in the New Century.

In 2001, President George W. Bush appointed him to the President's Council of Science and Technology. In 2004, Bush appointed him a member of the National Science Board, which oversees the National Science Foundation and provides advice to Congress and the president on issues of science and technology. Also in 2004, the American Society of Civil Engineers presented him with the Outstanding Projects and Leaders award for his contribution to education, and the University of California, Berkeley College of Engineering honored him with one of the four Distinguished Engineering Alumni Awards.

In 2008, Clough was made an honorary member of the ANAK Society, Georgia Tech's oldest known secret society and honor society. In October 2008, the National Academy of Engineering presented Clough with the Arthur M. Bueche Award for leadership in science, technology, and engineering policy. In February 2009, he received the Joseph M. Pettit Alumni Distinguished Service Award that recognizes a lifetime of leadership, achievement and service to Georgia Tech; and in March 2009, he was inducted into the Technology Hall of Fame of Georgia.

Clough has received eight honorary Doctor of Science degrees. In 2011, he received an honorary degree from Rensselaer Polytechnic Institute; in 2010, he received honorary degrees from Oglethorpe University in Atlanta; University of Maryland, Baltimore County; and Williams College in Williamstown. He had previously received honorary doctorates from Shanghai Jiao Tong University, Florida Southern College and the University of South Carolina. In April 2010, he was named a member of the American Academy of Arts and Sciences.

During the ground breaking ceremony for the G. Wayne Clough Undergraduate Learning Commons building held in 2010, President Bud Peterson and University System of Georgia Chancellor Erroll B. Davis Jr. presented to Clough a proclamation declaring him President Emeritus of the Georgia Institute of Technology. In 2011, Georgia Tech opened the G. Wayne Clough Undergraduate Learning Commons building named in honor of his commitment to undergraduate students; it was dedicated on Clough's birthday, September 24, 2011. In May 2011, he was awarded the 2011 Foreign Policy Association Medal.

Academic offices
Preceded by John Crecine	10th President of the Georgia Institute of Technology; 1994–2008	Succeeded by George P. Peterson
Government offices
Preceded by Lawrence M. Small	12th Secretary of the Smithsonian Institution; 2008–2014	Succeeded by David J. Skorton
