= Lawrence M. Small =

American businessman (born 1941)

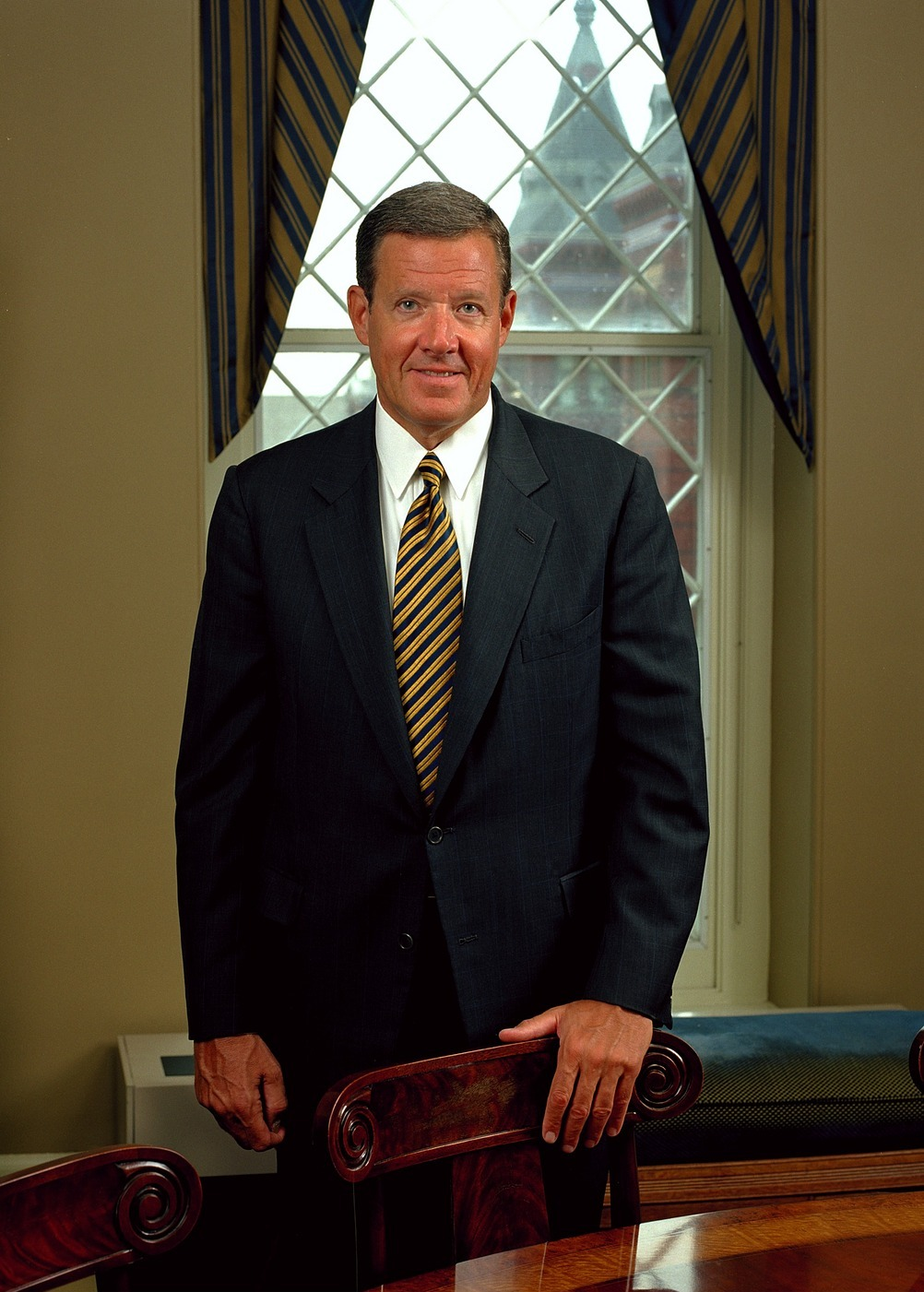

11th Secretary of the Smithsonian Institution
- In office January 2000 – 2007
- Preceded by: I. Michael Heyman
- Succeeded by: G. Wayne Clough

Personal details
- Born: September 14, 1941 (age 85) New York City, New York
- Education: Brown University (BA)

Lawrence M. Small is an American businessman and academic who was the President and Chief Operating Officer of the Federal National Mortgage Association and the 11th Secretary of the Smithsonian Institution.

== Background ==
Small grew up in suburban New Rochelle, New York. He graduated from New Rochelle High School followed by Brown University in 1963 where he earned a Bachelor's Degree in Spanish literature, after having spent his junior year in Spain. He held executive positions in Citicorp and Citibank before becoming the President and COO of the FNMA, a position he held between 1991 and 2000. He is a director of the Chubb Corporation and serves on the boards of Marriott International, Inc., New York City's Spanish Repertory Theatre, the National Gallery of Art, the John F. Kennedy Center for the Performing Arts and the Woodrow Wilson International Center for Scholars.

== Time at the Smithsonian ==
The Smithsonian's Board of Regents appointed Small as the Secretary on January 24, 2000 on the strength of his management experience. They hoped he would be able to improve the institution's management and fund-raising, bringing a business style to what had traditionally been a very academic institution. He expanded the commercial sponsorship of museum exhibitions. Roger Sant, the chairman of the executive committee of the Board of Regents, claimed that Small had helped raise $1.1 billion for the institution and contributed half a million dollars himself.

Small's plans were met with considerable resistance. In 2001, Small withdrew his proposal to close the Conservation and Research Center in Front Royal, Virginia (now the Smithsonian Conservation Biology Institute) after strong opposition from scientists.

In 2004, Small pleaded guilty to violating federal bird-protection laws (ESA, CITES, MBTA) by owning Amazonian tribal artifacts that contained feathers of protected bird species.

In 2006, the Smithsonian agreed to a deal with Showtime Networks to create Smithsonian Networks, a joint venture to create television programming with the Smithsonian's resources. Controversy over the deal emerged when it was disclosed that the network had the right of first refusal for commercial documentaries that rely heavily on Smithsonian collections or staff.

In 2007, Acting Smithsonian Inspector General A. Sprightley Ryan reviewed Small's expenses and reported that $90,000 of expenses between 2000 and 2005 were unauthorized, prompting the watchdog group Citizens for Responsibility and Ethics in Washington to call on the Attorney General Alberto R. Gonzales to investigate whether the spending violated federal law. The U.S. Senate froze a $17 million appropriations increase for the Smithsonian, citing Small's compensation as excessive. On March 26, Small resigned from his position.

A subsequent independent report commissioned by the Smithsonian was highly critical of Small's "imperialistic and insular" management style, including documented resistance to sharing information with the Regents and the audit committee. It also disputed claims earlier made on Small's behalf (see above) on the extent of his personal fund-raising achievements. The Smithsonian in response acknowledged the need to institute reforms in its governance and oversight arrangements.
