= Robert R. Wagner =

Virologist

- Born: January 5, 1923; New York City
- Died: September 15, 2001 (aged 78)
- Education: Columbia College, Yale University
- Known for: Study of vesicular stomatitis virus
- Scientific career
- Fields: Virology
- Workplaces: Yale University, Johns Hopkins University, University of Virginia School of Medicine
- Notable students: Alice S. Huang

Robert R. Wagner (1923–2001) was an American virologist who spent time on the faculty at Yale University, Johns Hopkins University, and finally the University of Virginia School of Medicine, from which he retired as professor emeritus in 1994. His research focused on the vesicular stomatitis virus. Wagner died of cancer in 2001.

== Education ==
Wagner attended Columbia College as an undergraduate and received his bachelor's degree in 1943, after which he began medical school at Yale Medical School and received his M.D. in 1946. Following his internship, he joined the U.S. Navy Medical Corps, where he was first exposed to virology research while assigned to the U.S. Navy Medical Research Institute in Bethesda, Maryland. He served from 1947 to 1949, and became a lieutenant in the navy reserves. After his time in the Navy, Wagner moved to England to work as a postdoctoral fellow with Christopher Andrewes.

== Academic career ==
Wagner joined the faculty at Yale University in 1951 and then moved to Johns Hopkins in 1957, where he became the director of the Infectious Disease Division and later the head of the Division of Virology. In 1967 Wagner moved to the University of Virginia School of Medicine to serve as the chair of the Department of Microbiology. Under his leadership the department expanded dramatically, both in number of faculty and in breadth of research. Wagner also became the director of the newly created University of Virginia Cancer Center and was appointed the Marion McNulty and Marvin C. Weaver Professor of Oncology in 1984.

Following a brief stint as the virology section editor for the Journal of Bacteriology, run by the American Society for Microbiology, Wagner served as the founding editor-in-chief of the Journal of Virology, working with fellow editors Lloyd Kozloff and Norman Salzman. The journal launched in 1966, and Wagner continued in his role for 15 years, overseeing a large expansion in the size of the journal before stepping down in 1982 and being succeeded by Edward M. Scolnick. With Heinz Fraenkel-Conrat, Wagner collaborated in editing a vast 19-volume treatise called Comprehensive Virology. The first volume was reviewed in 1975 as somewhat difficult to understand for those unfamiliar to the field, but likely valuable as a reference work. In the early 1980s, Wagner was among the group of American virologists who helped organize and became the founding members of the American Society for Virology.

Wagner retired and assumed professor emeritus status at the University of Virginia in 1994, though he continued to be an active member of the community. His department - now the Department of Microbiology, Immunology, and Cancer Biology - awards the Robert R. Wagner Prize to excellent graduate students.

== Research ==
Wagner has been recognized as a major contributor to the development of molecular virology. During the early 1960s, while at Johns Hopkins, he became involved in research on interferons, which eventually entered clinical use. Much of his research focused on the molecular biology of the vesicular stomatitis virus. With student Alice S. Huang, Wagner characterized what are now known as defective interfering particles.
