= Georgia Tech Library =

Academic library in Atlanta, Georgia, United States

Coordinates: 33.7743°N 84.3956°W

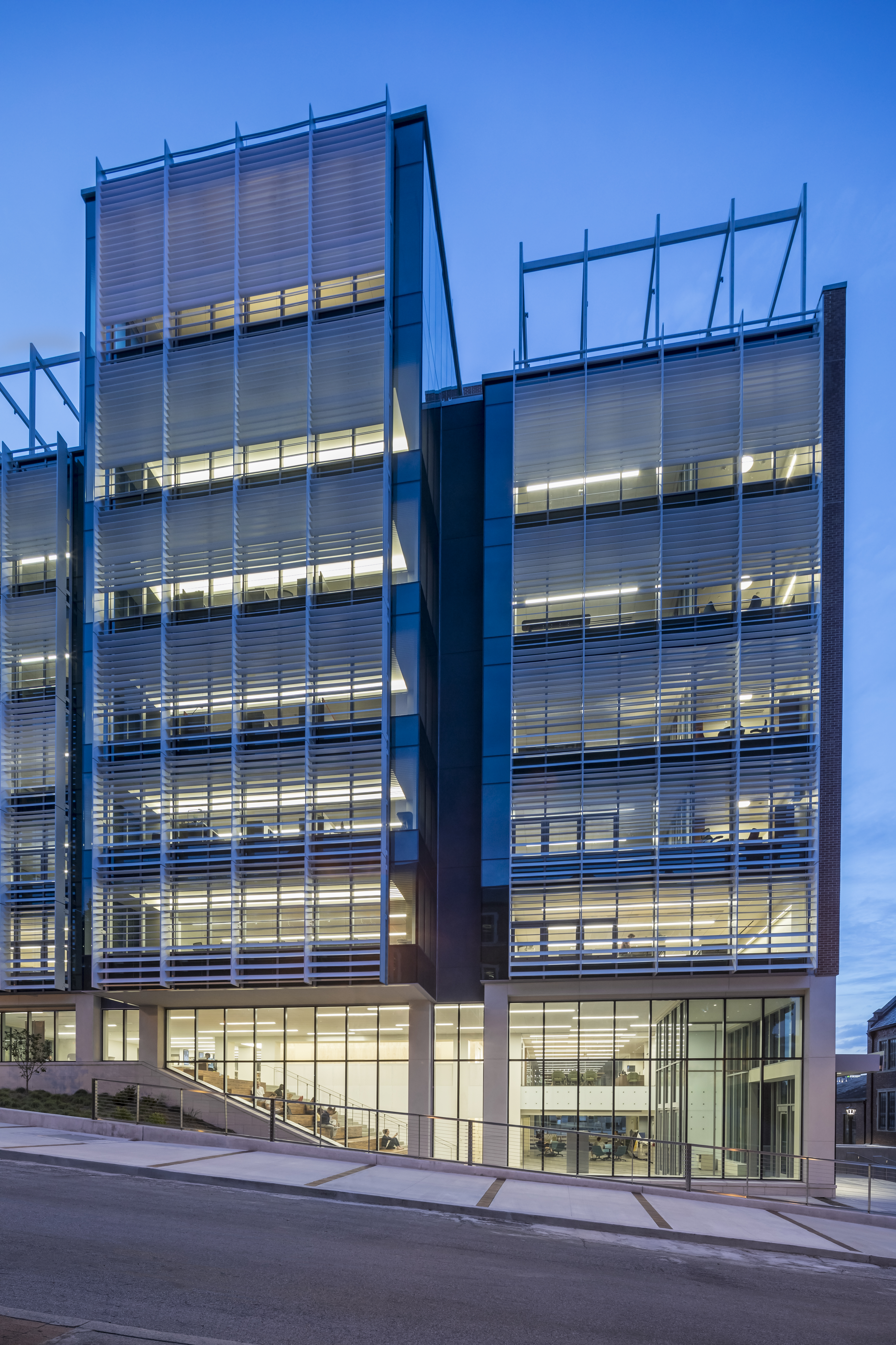
- Crosland Tower at night
- Location: Georgia Tech in Atlanta, Georgia
- Type: Academic library
- Established: 1885

Collection
- Items collected: 2.4 million

Other information
- Director: Leslie Sharp; Dean of Libraries
- Website: library.gatech.edu

The Georgia Tech Library is an academic library that serves the needs of students, faculty, and staff at the Georgia Institute of Technology. The library consists of the S. Price Gilbert Memorial Library and Dorothy M. Crosland Tower. In addition, the library is connected to and manages the Clough Undergraduate Learning Commons.

The Association of College and Research Libraries (ACRL) recognized the library's effort to reinvent itself by awarding it a 2007 Excellence in Academic Libraries Award. The Georgia Tech Library is located in the center of campus and is open 24/7 as of the Fall term of 2014. Among the Library staff members are subject specialists in 35 disciplines.

Dr. Leslie Sharp serves as dean of the Georgia Tech Library. She began her tenure as Dean July 1, 2020 after serving as interim chief executive officer for the Library since March 2019, a role she shared with her duties as associate vice provost for Graduate Education and Faculty Development.

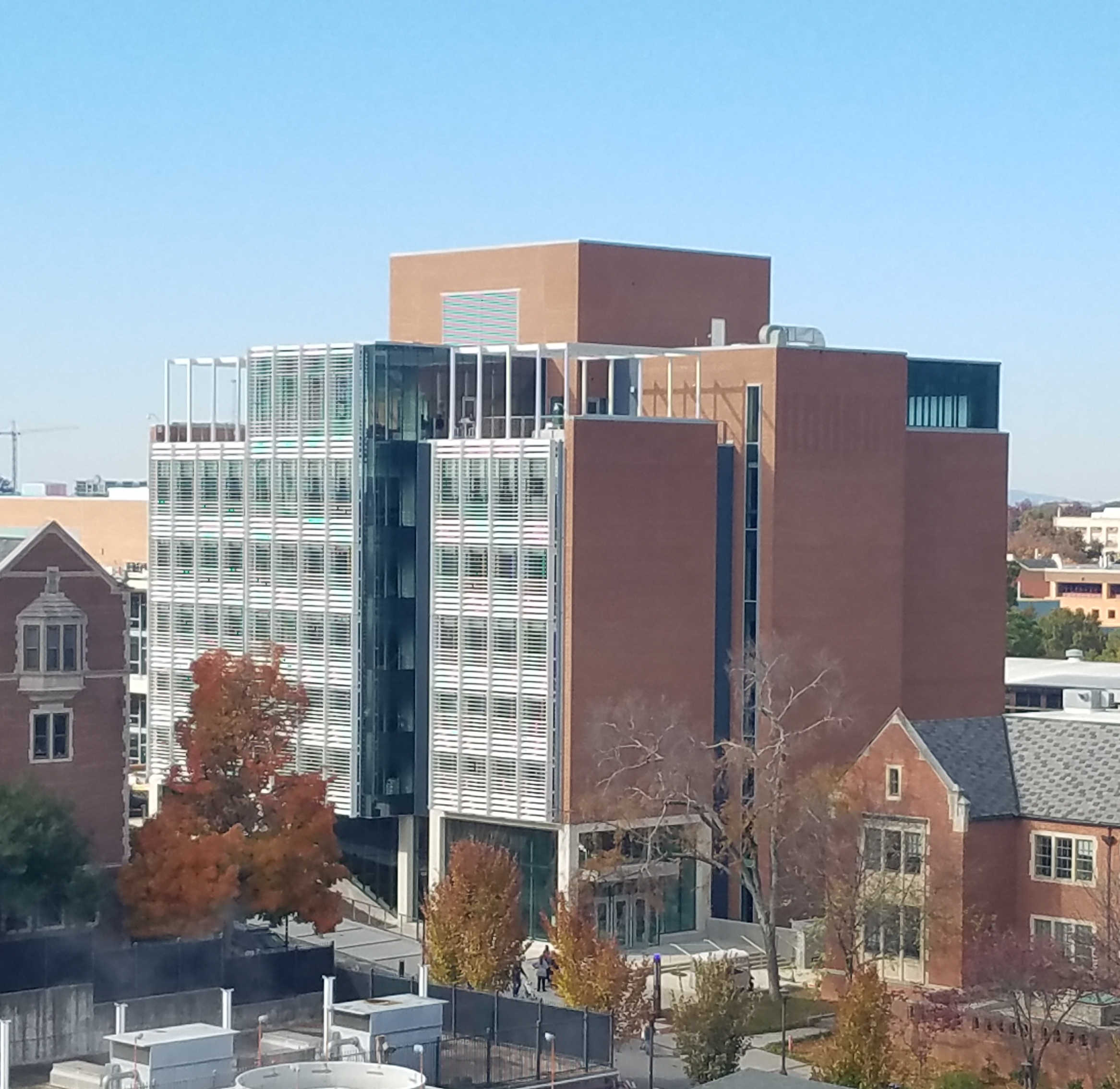
Crosland Tower in 2019 following renovations

== History ==
Judge Sterling Price Gilbert donated a large sum of Coca-Cola stock to Georgia Tech with the stipulation that the proceeds be used to construct a new library. He later donated more funds to the cause. Ground was broken for the S. Price Gilbert Memorial Library on July 5, 1951, and the building was dedicated on November 21, 1953. The Graduate Addition to the library was opened in 1969, and was renamed Crosland Tower in 1985.

Dorothy M. Crosland was the long-time head librarian; initially appointed as Assistant Librarian in 1925, she was promoted to Librarian in 1927 and Director of Libraries in 1953, a title she would hold until her retirement in 1971.

Paul M. Heffernan, then a professor in the Georgia Tech School of Architecture, was the lead designer on the S. Price Gilbert Library.

In 2017 a large-scale renovation project began with Crosland Tower to modernize it, opening up the space inside and changing the veneer to more curtainwall instead of solid brick to allow more natural light into the building and upgrade the finishes & MEP systems. The Crosland project was finished prior to the start of the spring 2019 semester. Following its opening, a renovation project began on the S. Price Gilbert Library. The total renovation was completed in spring 2020, and the library opened in full for fall semester 2020.

== Collections ==
The library’s collections include over 2.4 million books, bound periodicals and serials, including about 900,000 government documents, 2.7 million technical reports, over 197,000 cartographic materials, more than 240 online databases, over 29,000 electronic books and 39,000 e-journals.

The Archives and Special Collections department preserves and provides access to the history of Georgia Tech, and includes over 4300 rare books emphasizing the history of science and technology, a 4000-volume science fiction collection, photographic collections, and approximately 1000 manuscript collections.

In 2015, the library moved 99% of its print collections to an off-site service center as part of a partnership with Emory University. This Library Service Center was opened and dedicated in 2016. Plans to move the "core collection" of roughly 30,000 volumes representing the fields of study offered at Georgia Tech back into the building were delayed due to Covid-19.

== Services ==
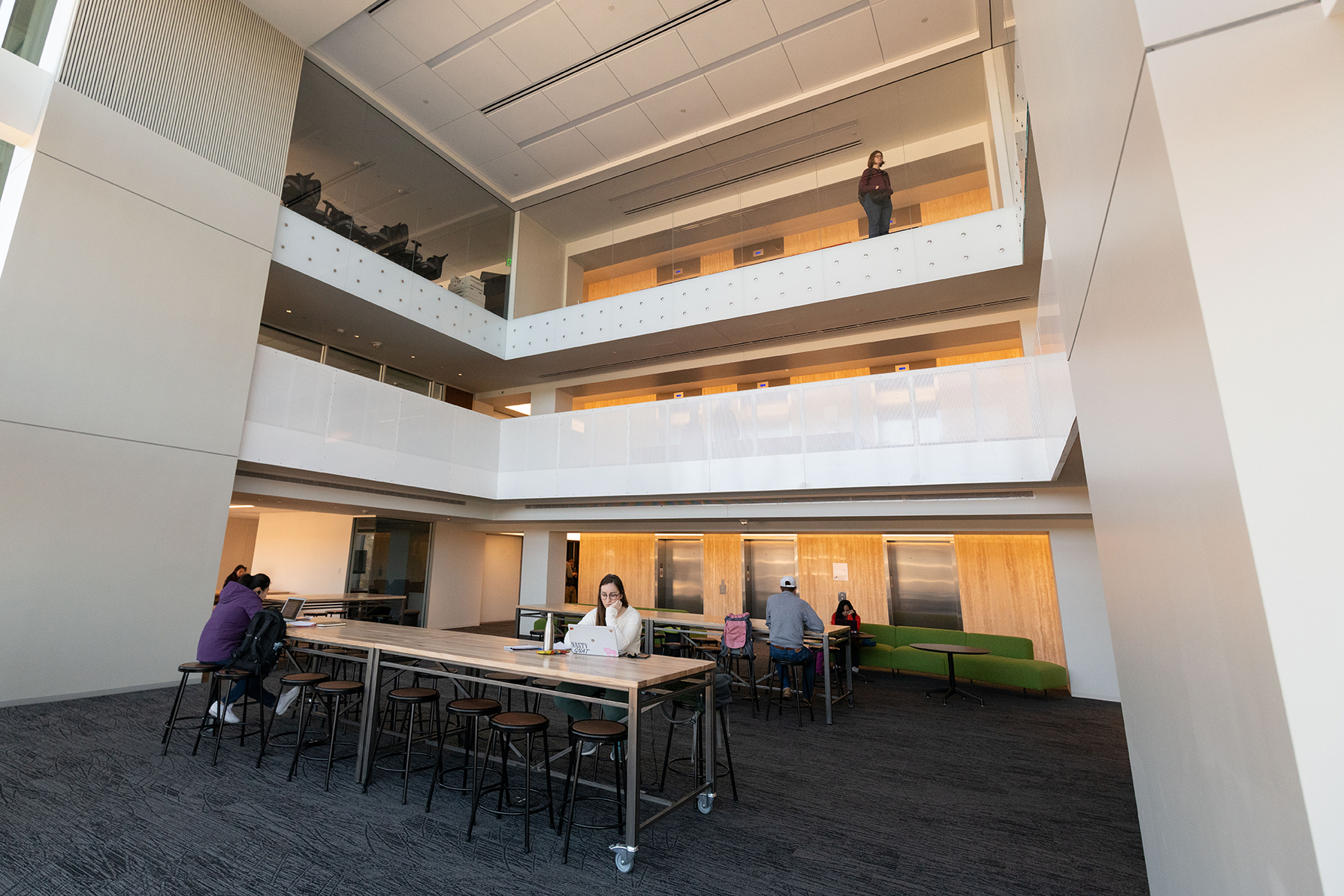
Innovation and Ideation Studio

Seventh Floor Reading Room

Upon completion of the renovations in fall 2020, the Georgia Tech Library brought students a range of new services and spaces. These include:

- Collaborative and quiet study spaces throughout the building, including reading rooms on the Grove Level and sixth and seventh floors of Crosland Tower, and first and third floors of Price Gilbert.
- The Science Fiction Lounge on the first floor of Crosland Tower featuring circulating items from the Bud Foote Science Fiction Collection.
- The Archives Reading Room on the first floor of Crosland Tower.
- The Innovation and Ideation Studio on the second floor of Crosland Tower, which includes a Library classroom.
- The Media Scholarship Commons on the third floor of Price Gilbert.
- The Data Visualization Studio and retroTECH lab on the third floor of Crosland Tower.
- The Faculty Research Zone, including a Teaching Studio, on fourth floor of Price Gilbert.
- The Graduate Student Community on the sixth floor of Crosland Tower.
- Computing clusters in both buildings and Clough.

In addition to the new spaces, the Georgia Tech Library offers a hundreds of events, classes, lectures and workshops yearly for students, faculty and the campus community. All are free and serve to supplement the Institute's curriculum.
