= Shih Choon Fong =

Singaporean mechanics professor and university administrator

- 施春风
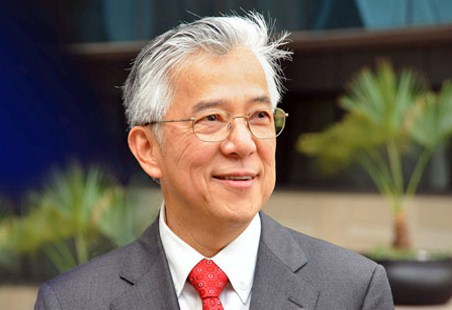

1st President of the KAUST
- In office December 2008 – June 2013
- Succeeded by: Jean-Lou Chameau

1st President of the National University of Singapore
- In office 2000–2008
- Preceded by: Office established
- Succeeded by: Tan Chorh Chuan

Personal details
- Born: 1945 (age 80–81) Singapore, Straits Settlements
- Spouse: Li Cheng
- Education: Harvard University (MS, PhD)
- Website: nus.edu.sg/about-nus-2/history/vice-chancellors/shih-choon-fong
- Scientific career
- Awards: Medal of Honor by the Chinese Academy of Sciences (2019)
- Fields: Applied science
- Thesis: Elastic-plastic analysis of combined mode crack problems (1973)
- Doctoral advisor: John W. Hutchinson

Shih Choon Fong (Chinese: 施春风; pinyin: Shī Chūnfēng; born 1945) is a Singaporean college administrator and fracture mechanics expert who served as the founding president of the King Abdullah University of Science and Technology (KAUST) between 2008 and 2013. Prior joining KAUST as its founding president, he was the president of the National University of Singapore (NUS) for nine years and has been widely acknowledged for creating the university's research-intensive focus with an entrepreneurial dimension, as well as for NUS' elevated global reputation. Drawing from his experiences abroad, Shih institutionalised a performance- and market-based evaluation and compensation system for academics.

Shih was a key driver for the formation of the International Alliance of Research Universities, and led the Association of Pacific Rim Universities (APRU) for four years. He was the founding chair of the Governing Board of the APRU World Institute and served on national-level committees such as the Economic Review Committee, which crafted wide-ranging strategies for the re-making of Singapore.

== Education ==
Shih graduated with a professional diploma in engineering from Singapore Polytechnic in 1966. He received his Master of Science and PhD in applied science from Harvard University.

== Career ==
After completing his PhD, Shih became a Mathematical Analyst at the American Science and Engineering from 1969 to 1974. He was appointed as the Leader of Fracture Research Group at Corporate R&D Laboratory of General Electric from 1974 to 1981. He joined Brown University as Associate Professor in 1981. He became a full professor in 1986.

Shih joined the National University of Singapore and served as the Founding Director of the Institute of Materials Research and Engineering from 1996 to 1999. He later became the Deputy Vice-Chancellor (1997–2000) and Vice-Chancellor and President (2000 – Dec 2008) of NUS.

Shih was announced as the Founding President of the King Abdullah University of Science and Technology (KAUST) on 13 January 2008. Shih fully assumed this new role on 1 December 2008. Leading KAUST in its formative years, Shih promoted the university as a destination of choice for graduate education and cutting-edge research, where the synergy between education and research catalyzes ideas and innovations to address global challenges and improve lives. Under his guidance KAUST has become internationally respected among the world's best faculty, said then-chairman of KAUST's Board of Trustees and Saudi Oil minister Ali I. Al-Naimi in a tribute on Shih's stepping down. Shih was succeeded by Caltech president Jean-Lou Chameau in July 2013.

Shih serves in advisory roles and visiting committees with University of Chinese Academy of Sciences, Peking University, SUSTech, American University of Sharjah, and MIT. He served on the Queen Elizabeth Prize for Engineering Judging Panel from 2012 to 2017.

== Awards ==
Shih is among the highly cited researchers in the world for the category of engineering compiled by the Institute for Scientific Information (ISI).

In 2004, Shih became the first Singaporean to be elected as a Foreign Associate to the United States National Academy of Engineering. He was elected for the development of innovative computational methods in nonlinear fracture mechanics and for international leadership in engineering.

He was awarded the French decoration "Chevalier" in the Order of the "Legion d'Honneur" in 2005.

In recognition of his work and research achievements, Shih was elected as a Foreign Honorary Member of the American Academy of Arts and Sciences in 2006.

Shih received Honorary Doctor of Science degrees from Loughborough University, Waseda University and Brown University.

In 2007, Shih received the inaugural Chief Executive Leadership Award for Asia Pacific presented by the Council for Advancement and Support for Education.

He also served on the Engineering and Computer Science jury for the Infosys Prize in 2009 and 2010.

In 2016, an international symposium was held in Cambridge, Massachusetts, in honor of Shih on the occasion of his 70th birthday.

In 2018, Shih received the Centennial Medal from Harvard Graduate School of Arts and Sciences (GSAS) for his innovative research and leadership in higher education.

In 2019, he became a laureate of the Asian Scientist 100 by the Asian Scientist.

Academic offices
Preceded by Lim Pin as Vice Chancellor	President of National University of Singapore; 2000–2008	Succeeded by Tan Chorh Chuan
New creation	President of the King Abdullah University of Science and Technology; 2008–2013	Succeeded by Jean-Lou Chameau
