= Judge Gilbert =

Judge Gilbert may refer to:

- Frank L. Gilbert (1864–1930), county judge for Dane County, Wisconsin
- Jeffrey Gilbert (judge) (1674–1726), English judge who held office as Lord Chief Baron of the Exchequer in both Ireland and England
- John Phil Gilbert (born 1949), judge of the United States District Court for the Southern District of Illinois
- Philip H. Gilbert (1870–1932), judge of the Louisiana 27th Judicial District
- William Ball Gilbert (1847–1931), judge of the United States Court of Appeals for the Ninth Circuit

== See also ==
- Justice Gilbert (disambiguation)
