= UCSF Graduate Division =

Graduate school in San Francisco

Graduate Division
- Type: Graduate school
- Established: 1961
- Parent institution: University of California, San Francisco
- Dean: Elizabeth Watkins
- Postgraduates: 1,600
- Doctoral students: 1,100
- Location: San Francisco, California; 37°46′04″N 122°23′34″W
- Website: https://graduate.ucsf.edu/

The UCSF Graduate Division is the graduate school of the University of California, San Francisco, and is located in San Francisco. It is recognized as one of the premier biomedical graduate schools in the United States. It offers 19 PhD programs, 11 MS programs, two certificates and a physical therapy program.

== History ==
In the 1960s, UCSF (then called the Medical Department of the University of California) gained more independence from the UC system. It started to be regarded as a campus in its own right instead of the medical center of the UC system. The four departments (Medicine, Pharmacy, Dentistry, and Nursing) were renamed as "school of", and the Graduate Division was founded in 1961. The UC Regents began to decentralize graduate education, which had been previously concentrated at the Berkeley, and UCSF received a graduate dean and council in its own right.

The first dean, Harold Harper, had been a staunch advocate of graduate studies independence, and the recognition of graduate activities in general and basic sciences in particular. He was crucial in transferring the graduate programs from the Berkeley campus to the UCSF campus.

At the time of its creation, the UCSF Graduate Division offered graduate programs in anatomy, biochemistry, comparative biochemistry, biophysics, dental surgery, dentistry, endocrinology, history of medicine, medical physics, microbiology, nursing, nutrition, pathology, comparative pathology, pharmaceutical chemistry, pharmacology, comparative pharmacology and toxicology, physiology, and animal physiology. More programs were added in 1966, as degrees in oral biology, nursing science, and psychology. In 1969, the School of Medicine and the Graduate Division sponsored the creation of the Medical Scientist Training Program (MSTP). This program, funded by the US Public Health Service, offers a special stipend to students to pursue graduate work along with a medical degree, in order to address the lack of research training in physicians.

After Harper's 20 year-long leadership, he was followed in 1981 by professor of Microbiology and Immunology Lloyd Kozloff, who served until 1991. Under his leadership, the Program in Biological Sciences (PIBS) and the Biomedical Sciences (BMS) was developed at the Parnassus campus, and the Graduate Division started exponentially growing its numbers of postdoctoral students in biological, physical, and social sciences.

== Graduate Programs ==
The programs offered by the UCSF Graduate Division include:

Basic and Biomedical Sciences

- Tetrad (Biochemistry and Molecular Biology, Cell Biology, and Genetics)
- Bioengineering (joint with UC Berkeley)
- Biological and Medical Informatics (BMI)
- Biomedical Sciences (BMS)
- Biophysics
- Chemistry and Chemical Biology (CCB)
- Developmental and Stem Cell Biology (DSCB)
- Epidemiology and Translational Science
- Genetic Counseling
- Neuroscience
- Oral and Craniofacial Sciences
- Pharmaceutical Sciences and Pharmacogenomics (PSPG)
- Rehabilitation Science

Social and Populational Sciences

- Global Health Sciences
- History of Health Sciences
- Medical Anthropology
- Nursing
- Sociology

== List of deans ==
- Howard A. Harper, Ph.D. (1961-1980)
- Lloyd Kozloff, Ph.D. (1981-1991)
- C. Clifford Attkisson, Ph.D. (1991-2005)
- Patricia Calarco, Ph.D. (2005-2011)
- Elizabeth Watkins, Ph.D. (2012–2021)
- Nicquet Blake, Ph.D. (2021-Present)
