= Dorothy M. Crosland =

American librarian (1903–1983)

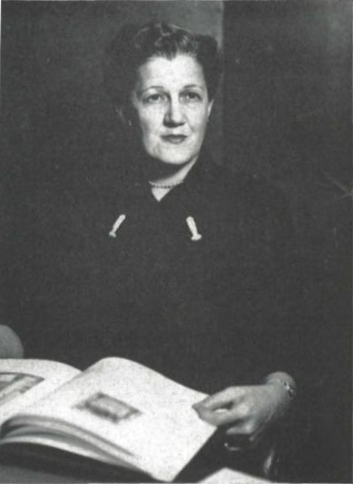
Crosland, c. 1952

Dorothy Murray Crosland (September 13, 1903 - March 24, 1983) was the long-time head librarian of the Georgia Tech Library at the Georgia Institute of Technology. Initially appointed as Assistant Librarian in 1925, she was promoted to Librarian in 1927 and Director of Libraries in 1953, a title she would hold until her retirement in 1971.

== Education and early life ==
Crosland was born on September 13, 1903, in Stone Mountain, Georgia. She went to Girls High School in Atlanta, and graduated in 1923 with a degree from the Library School of the Carnegie Library of Atlanta, later known as the Emory University School of Library Science.

== Career ==
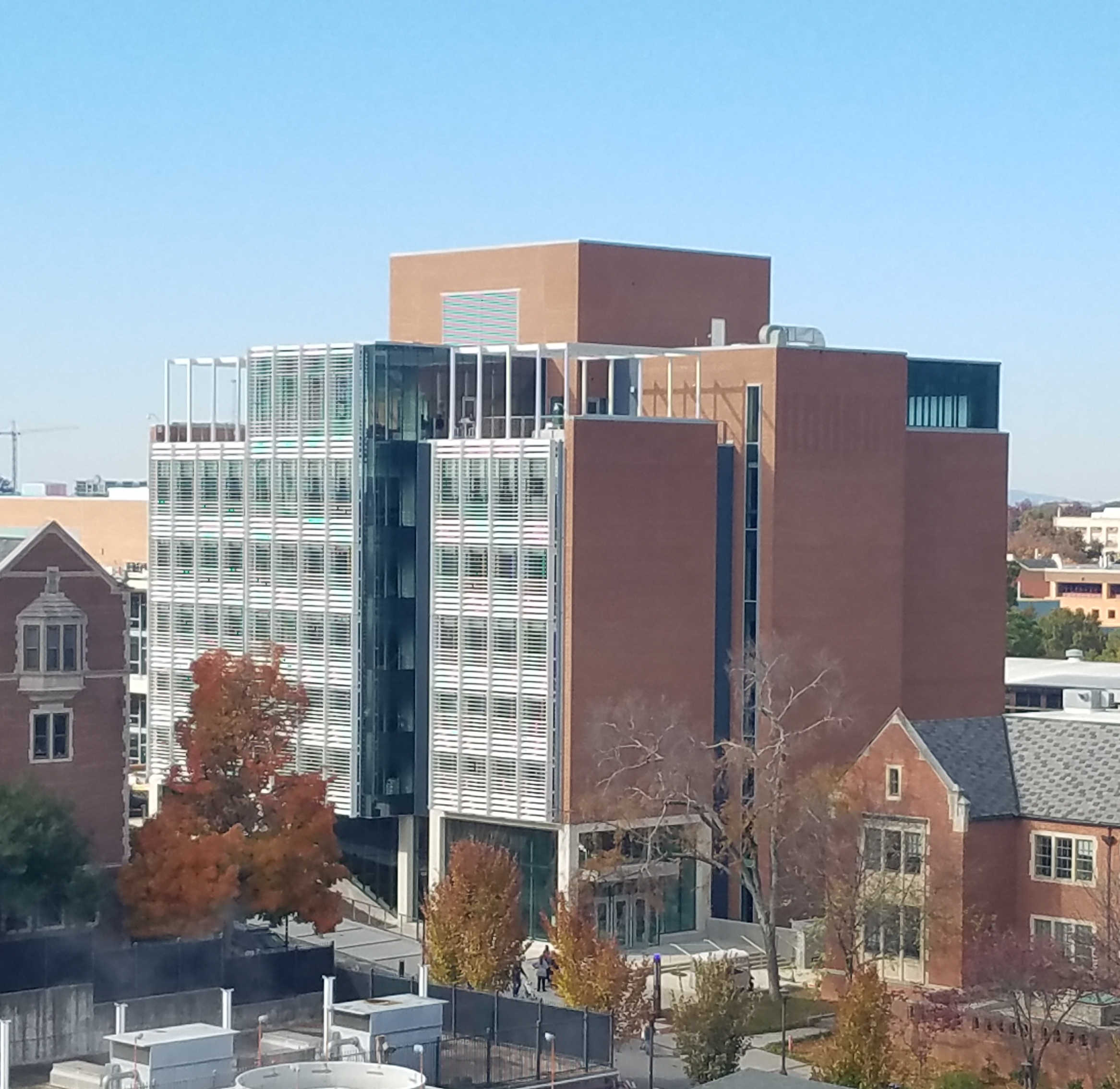
Crosland Tower at Georgia Tech

In 1945, Crosland was named the Woman of the Year in Education. Crosland was the executive secretary (from 1950 to 1952) and president (from 1952 to 1954) of the Southeastern Library Association and president of the Georgia Library Association from 1949 to 1951. Crosland oversaw the planning and construction of the current library building and the architecture library at Georgia Tech, both of which were dedicated in 1952. She also oversaw the construction of the Graduate Addition, a tower one-and-a-half times the size of the existing library, which was completed in 1968. The building's dedication stated: "In a real sense these two buildings are a memorial to Dorothy M. Crosland, Director of Libraries. Through her industry, her persistence and perseverance, her foresightedness, both structures have been conceived and brought to completion." The Graduate Addition was renamed the Crosland Tower in 1985.

Crossland played a key role in the foundation of the College of Computing through her involvement in the convening of a series of conferences in 1961 and 1962. These would eventually result in the establishment of the School of Information (as it was then known) and the United States' first master's program in Information Science.

In 1961, she was named an honorary alumna of Georgia Tech.
