= Alice S. Huang =

American biologist

Alice Shih-hou Huang
- 黄诗厚
- Born: 22 March 1939 (age 87)
- Education: Wellesley College; Johns Hopkins University (BA, MA, PhD)
- Known for: Molecular biology of vesicular stomatitis virus
- Spouse: David Baltimore (m. 1968; died 2025)
- Children: 1
- Awards: Eli Lilly Award in Immunology and Microbiology (1977); Alice C. Evans Award (2001)
- Scientific career
- Fields: Microbiology
- Workplaces: University of Massachusetts Amherst; Johns Hopkins University; Keck Graduate Institute
- Thesis: Infective and defective particles of vesicular stomatitis virus: identification, inhibition of host rna synthesis and interfering activity. (1966)
- Website: bbe.caltech.edu/people/alice-s-huang

Alice Shih-hou Huang (Chinese: 黄诗厚; pinyin: Huáng Shīhòu; Wade–Giles: Huang Shih-hou) is a Chinese-American biologist specializing in microbiology and virology. She is currently a Senior Faculty Associate in Biology and Biological Engineering at the California Institute of Technology.

She served as president of the American Association for the Advancement of Science (AAAS) during the 2010–2011 term.

== Early life and education ==
Huang was born in the city of Nanchang, Jiangxi province, China, to Quentin K. Y. Huang and Grace Betty Soong. Her father, from Anhui, China, had become an orphan at age 12 and was taken in by a missionary, eventually becoming an American educated Anglican bishop and missionary. Her mother came from a Buddhist family with large land holdings in Jiangxi Province, and converted to Christianity.

She was raised Christian, and emigrated to the United States in 1949. She attended St. Mary's Hall-Doane Academy (in Burlington, New Jersey), the National Cathedral School (in Washington, D.C.), and Wellesley College (in Wellesley, Massachusetts). Huang received her B.A., M.A., and Ph.D. (1966) degrees from Johns Hopkins University. Her doctoral dissertation was titled Infective and defective particles of vesicular stomatitis virus: identification, inhibition of host rna synthesis and interfering activity (1966).

== Career ==
=== Research ===
Huang's research focused on defective interfering particles (DIPs) which can be utilized to combat viruses. DIPs are composed of viral structural proteins and sets of DNA or RNA which are incomplete. These DIPs will interfere in replication of the virus because they are reproduced at the expense of a standard viral particle. Huang's work on DIPs has been utilized to combat cancer, HIV, and plant related diseases.

At Johns Hopkins and MIT her work for Robert R. Wagner and future husband David Baltimore was "to purify and characterize interfering viral particles". They studied the inhibition of cellular RNA synthesis by nonreplicating vesicular stomatitis virus, known to infect horses, cattle and swine.

At the time, biologists knew the central dogma to be DNA to RNA to protein, with DNA replication as the way to replicate ones genome. Huang and Baltimore unraveled that RNA viruses were different and used RNA polymerase to replicate its RNA genome, but they discovered an enzyme, reverse transcriptase (in a mouse leukemia retrovirus), that converts RNA to DNA (involved in a process now known as reverse transcription). Baltimore later received the Nobel Prize in 1975 for his discovery.

Huang and Baltimore coauthored a paper with Martha Stampfer titled "Ribonucleic acid synthesis of vesicular stomatitis virus, II. An RNA polymerase in the virion." This paper went on to show that “the virions of vesicular stomatitis virus contain an enzyme that catalyzes the incorporation of ribonucleotides into RNA”.

While at Harvard Medical School, Huang continued to study how mutant strains produced by rabies-like virus interfered with further growth of the viral infection. In 1977, she was awarded the Eli Lilly Award in Microbiology and Immunology for this research. From 1971 to 1991, Huang taught at Harvard Medical School as a Microbiology and Molecular Genetics professor.

=== Administration ===
At Harvard, Huang served as coordinator of the Virology Unit at the Channing Laboratories of Infectious Diseases at Boston Medical Center for two years, and as director of the "Virus-Host Interactions in Cancer" training program (funded by the National Cancer Institute) for fifteen years.

Huang directed the Laboratories of Infectious Diseases at Boston Children's Hospital in 1979, where she studied viral diseases in pediatric patients. At New York University, Huang participated in a project in science education and received a grant that focused on improving teachers’ preparation and ability to engage students in science exploration and discovery.

At New York University, Huang was appointed as dean of science; She took on the role from 1991 to 1997.

Huang is an emeritus member of the board of trustees of the Keck Graduate Institute of Applied Life Sciences (KGI).

Huang is a former trustee of the Waksman Foundation for Microbiology and a trustee of the Public Agenda. She was pointed a council member of the California Council on Science and Technology in 2004 and served for two terms.

=== Advice for Women in Science ===
In June 2015, Huang wrote an advice article for the Science Careers website.

A female postdoctoral scholar asked what she should do in response to her advisor looking down her shirt. Huang, who was married to her own postdoctoral advisor, replied, "I suggest you put up with it, with good humor if you can." Following strong reaction on social media, the article was removed within hours of being posted.

After the article was removed, Science Careers tweeted, "We apologize for printing it. It does not reflect our values or standards". A fuller apology claimed the article had not "undergone proper editorial review prior to posting." In an interview, Huang stood by her advice, saying, "What I try to do is give advice from experience, and to give the advice that would serve the writer well into the long-term future. I’m taking their best interests to heart rather than being in one camp or another camp or trying to push my own political agendas." She said she hoped to write a follow-up column with other people’s suggestions for dealing with the situation.

== Awards and honors ==
- 1977 – Eli Lilly Award in Immunology and Microbiology (from the American Society for Microbiology)
- 1982 – Doctor of Science (honorary), Wheaton College
- 1987 – Doctor of Science (honorary), from Mount Holyoke College
- 1991 – Doctor of Science (honorary), Medical College of Pennsylvania
- 1999 – Achievement Award (from the Chinese-American Faculty Association of Southern California)
- 2001 – the Alice C. Evans Award (from the American Society for Microbiology)
- 2009 – the Great Immigrants Award (from the Carnegie Corporation of New York)
- 2015 – The Johns Hopkins University School of Medicine Distinguished Alumnus/Alumna Award

== Professional societies ==
- 1966 – Sigma Xi Honor Society, Johns Hopkins Chapter
- 1967 – American Society for Microbiology (president 1989)
- 1971 – American Association for the Advancement of Science (fellow, ‘00, president 2010)
- 1974 – American Society for Biochemistry and Molecular Biology
- 1978 – Association of Women in Science (fellow)
- 1979 – Infectious Diseases Society of America (fellow)
- 1981 – American Society for Virology
- 1982 – American Academy of Microbiology (fellow)
- 1988 – Society of Chinese Bioscientists of America
- 1990 – Academia Sinica, Republic of China
- 1990 – New York Academy of Sciences
- 1995 – Pacific Council on International Policy

== Personal life ==
Huang was married in 1968 to David Baltimore. They had one daughter.
