= J. Carlos Santamarina =

Argentinian university teacher

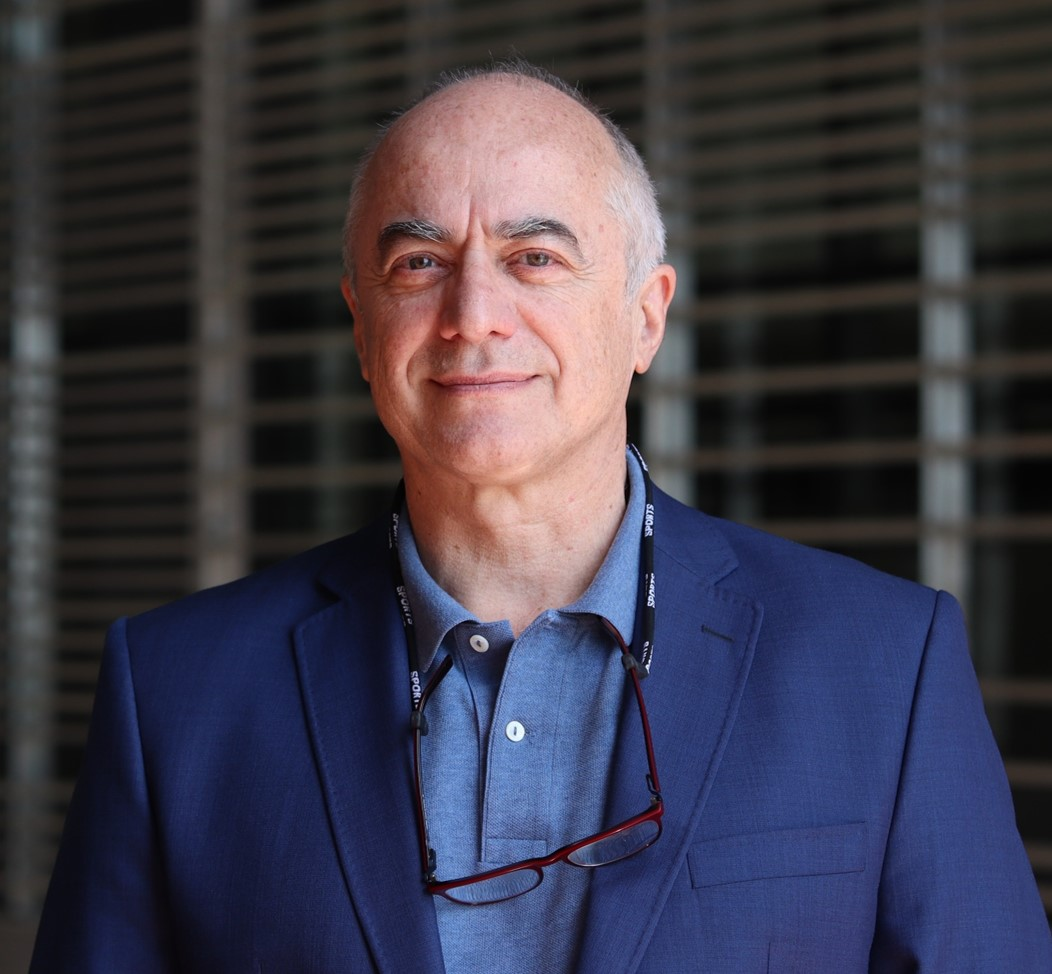
J. Carlos Santamarina

J. Carlos Santamarina is a professor of Civil and Environmental Engineering and Clough Chair at the Georgia Institute of Technology, Atlanta, USA.

== Biography ==
Santamarina was born in Cordoba, Argentina, studied civil engineering at the Universidad Nacional de Cordoba (degree in Civil Engineering, 1982), the University of Maryland (master's degree in 1984) and Purdue University (doctorate in 1987).

He was a member of the faculty at NYU Polytechnic University (1987–1991), University of Waterloo (1992–1995), and Georgia Tech (1996–2015) before he joined KAUST in March 2015 as the Associate Director of the Ali I. Al-Naimi Petroleum Engineering Research Center (ANPERC). Santamarina returned to Georgia Tech in 2023 where he leads the Energy GeoEngineering Laboratory, EGEL.

== Research areas ==
Santamarina's research team follows a "physics-inspired, data-driven" approach to study subsurface processes, which typically involve soils (granular materials), fractured rocks and complex fluids. The research brings together particle-level and pore-scale experiments, high-resolution process monitoring systems, and complementary numerical studies.

The research focusses on energy geotechnology with contributions to resource recovery (petroleum, gas, methane hydrates), energy geo-storage, efficiency and conservation, and the geological storage of energy waste (carbon geological storage, fly ash and nuclear waste).

== Awards and honors ==
A frequent keynote lecturer at international civil and geotechnical conferences, he delivered the American Society of Civil Engineers ASCE 50th Terzaghi Lecture on Energy Geotechnology in 2014. More recently, he delivered the ISSMGE Honour Lecture, Energy Geotechnics (2022) and the Bishop Lecture (2022), and will present the Casagrande Lecture in 2024.

Other awards include the International Hogentogler Award from the ATSM (2005 and 2016), the BGA Touring Lecturer from the British Geotechnical Association (2012), the European ALERT 2012 Research Medal (2012), the KGS Award from the Korean Geotechnical Society (2017), and the Tarek Al-Qasabi Award for Excellence in Civil Engineering in Saudi Arabia (2019, together with Junghee Park). He was awarded a Doctor Honoris Causa at the U. Nacional de Córdoba, Argentina (2015) and is a member of both Argentinean National Academies in Science (2003) and Engineering (2005), and recently received two best paper awards (2022 with M. Sanchez; 2021 with L. Torres-Cruz).

== Publications ==
- Soils and Waves. JC Santamarina, A Klein, MA Fam. Wiley, 508 pages. 2001. ISBN 978-0-471-49058-6. Link:
- Discrete Signals and Inverse Problems. JC Santamarina and D Fratta. Wiley, 364 pages. 2005. ISBN 978-0-470-02187-3. Link:
- Santamarina's publications are listed under Google Scholar.
