= Norman P. Salzman =

Virologist

- Born: Norman Post Salzman; August 14, 1926; Manhattan, New York, US
- Died: December 11, 1997 (aged 77); Potomac, Maryland, US
- Education: University of Illinois; University of Michigan
- Scientific career
- Fields: Virology
- Institutions: National Institutes of Health; Georgetown University; Frederick Cancer Research and Development Center

Norman Post Salzman (August 14, 1926 – December 11, 1997) was an American virologist. He spent much of his career as a scientist at the United States National Institutes of Health, where he rose to become the chief of the Laboratory on the Biology of Viruses; after retiring from the NIH in 1986, he worked at Georgetown University and later at the Frederick Cancer Research and Development Center. Salzman died of pancreatic cancer in 1997 at age 71.

== Education ==
Salzman was born in Manhattan and was an undergraduate at the City College of New York, from which he graduated in 1948. He received a master's degree from the University of Michigan in 1949 and a Ph.D. from the University of Illinois in 1953.

== Academic career ==
Salzman joined the NIH after finishing his Ph.D. in 1953. He spent most of his NIH tenure at the National Institute of Allergy and Infectious Diseases (NIAID). In 1961 he became the chief of the cell biology section in the institute's Laboratory of the Biology of Viruses, and in 1967 he became chief of the laboratory itself. While there he served as co-founding editor of the Journal of Virology, launched in 1967 under the leadership of Salzman, Lloyd M. Kozloff, and founding editor-in-chief Robert R. Wagner. Salzman's research interests included the polio virus, oncoviruses and the molecular mechanisms by which they cause cancer, and later retroviruses such as the human immunodeficiency virus.

Salzman retired from the NIH in 1986 and moved to Georgetown University School of Medicine to head a laboratory of molecular retrovirology there. In 1994 he moved again to the Frederick Cancer Research and Development Center and was serving as a laboratory head there at the time of his death.

Salzman died of pancreatic cancer in 1997. Since 1999, the Norman P. Salzman Memorial Award and Symposium in Virology has honored an excellent postdoctoral fellow studying virology at the NIH.
