= Clough Undergraduate Learning Commons =

G. Wayne Clough Undergraduate Learning Commons
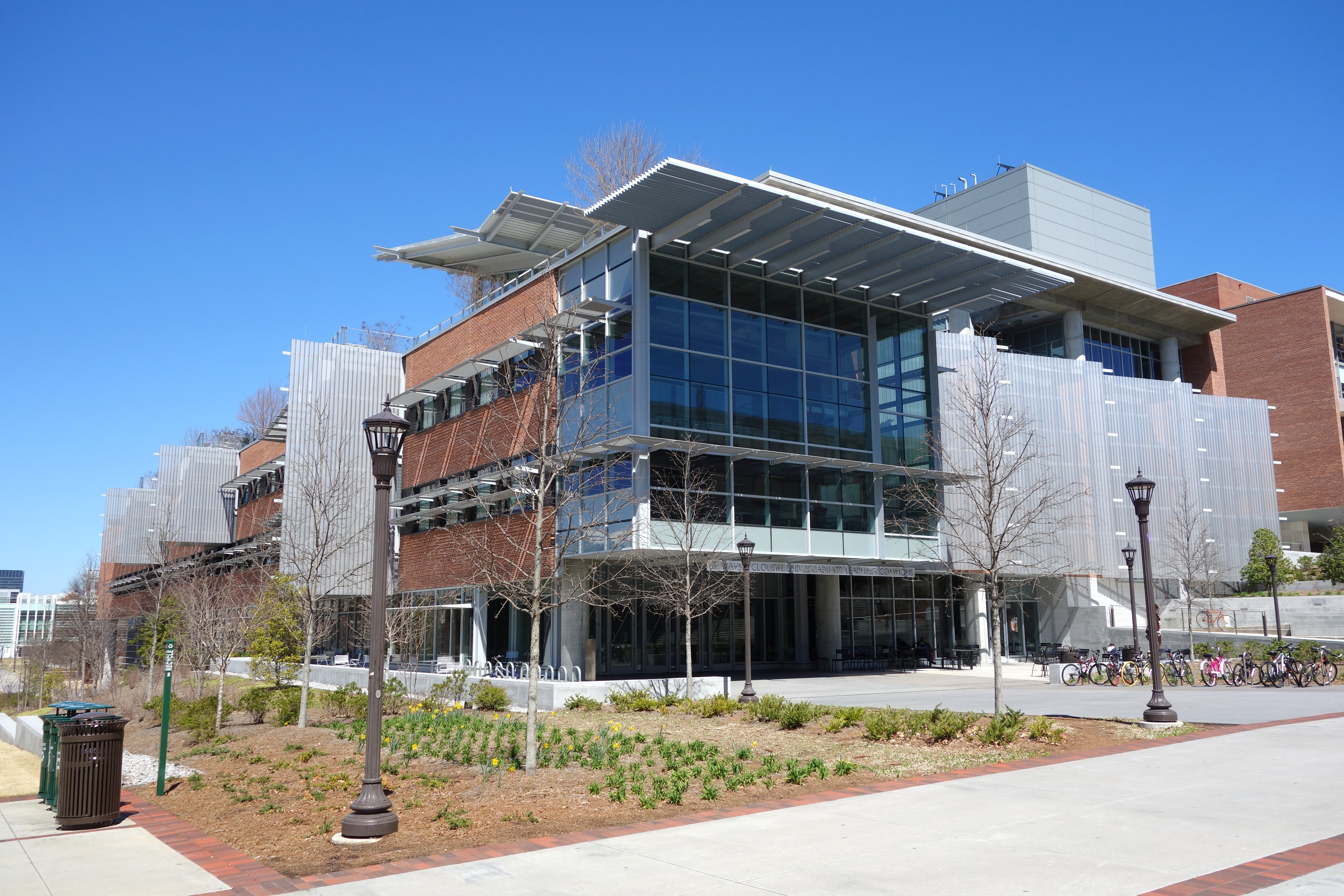
- Interactive map of the G. Wayne Clough Undergraduate Learning Commons area

General information
- Type: University building
- Location: Atlanta, Georgia, United States
- Coordinates: 33.774358°N 84.396463°W
- Construction started: Groundbreaking April 5, 2010
- Completed: Spring 2011
- Inaugurated: August 2011
- Owner: Georgia Institute of Technology

Technical details
- Floor count: 5
- Floor area: 220,000 square feet (20,000 m^{2})

Design and construction
- Architect: Bohlin Cywinski Jackson
- Services engineer: Newcomb & Boyd
- Other designers: Research Facilities Design
- Main contractor: Turner Construction

The G. Wayne Clough Undergraduate Learning Commons (Clough Commons), commonly referred to by its acronym CULC, is an academic building on the main campus of the Georgia Institute of Technology. The five-story, 220,000 sq ft (20,000 m^{2}) building houses classrooms, science laboratories, academic services, and common areas and is managed by and connected to the Georgia Tech Library. Named in honor of President Emeritus G. Wayne Clough, the Clough Commons cost $85 million and opened in the fall of 2011.

The building serves as an interdisciplinary facility to encourage collaboration and technologically enhanced teaching and learning. The Clough Commons, which was built with LEED certification in mind, contains various sustainability features and a roof garden, demonstrating Georgia Tech's commitment to sustainable design. In August 2012, the building, staged as a building within Googleplex, was a major piece of the set of the 2013 film The Internship.

== History ==
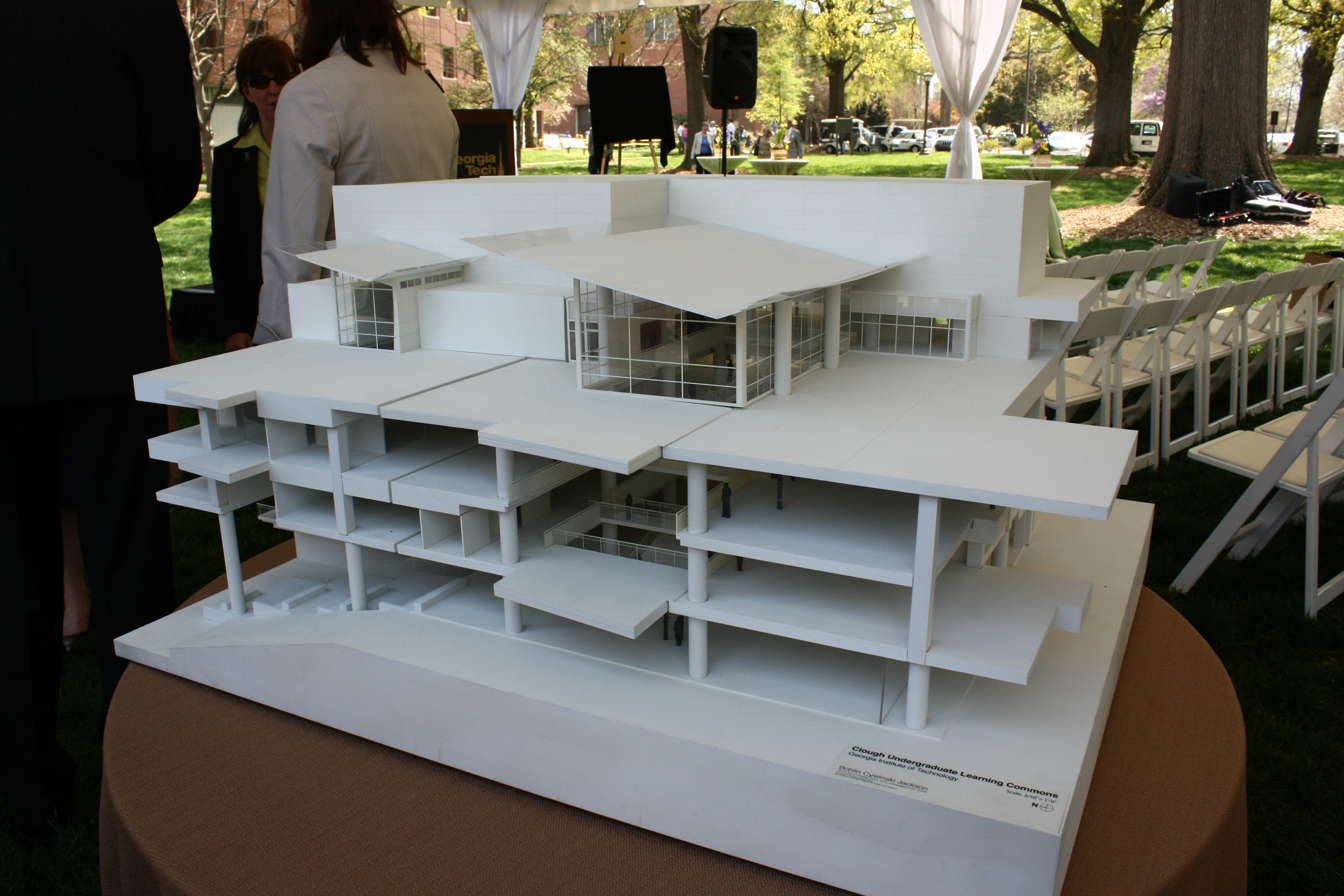
A scale model of the Clough Commons

The Clough Commons, which had been in the works for more than 10 years, was developed in response to the growth of Georgia Tech's student body. Fundraising for the new facility was nearly complete when the request to name it after then-Institute President G. Wayne Clough was made in June 2008. Plans for a new facility began during the early years of Clough's tenure as president. Over the next decade of his presidency, it became Georgia Tech's highest capital priority due to rapid student body growth. The naming of the Clough Commons was an effort by Campaign Georgia Tech, the institute's fundraising arm, to honor Clough's commitment to undergraduate education and to ensure future students know and appreciate the Clough legacy.

=== Financing ===
The Clough Commons is financed through a combination of private and public funding. It cost $93.7 million to build and outfit, of which the State of Georgia provided $60 million. As part of the private funding component, an anonymous donor matched dollar-for-dollar all gifts and commitments for the Clough Commons up to a maximum of $8.75 million.

=== Construction ===
Facility programming for the Clough Commons was completed by Perry Dean Rogers Architects and Houser Walker Architecture. Bohlin Cywinski Jackson was selected to design the project. The formal groundbreaking took place on April 5, 2010, with Clough, Institute President G. P. "Bud" Peterson and University System of Georgia Chancellor Erroll B. Davis present.

Construction of the building was undertaken by Turner Construction and completed in August 2011. It opened for the first time to the Georgia Tech community on August 20, 2011.

== Location ==
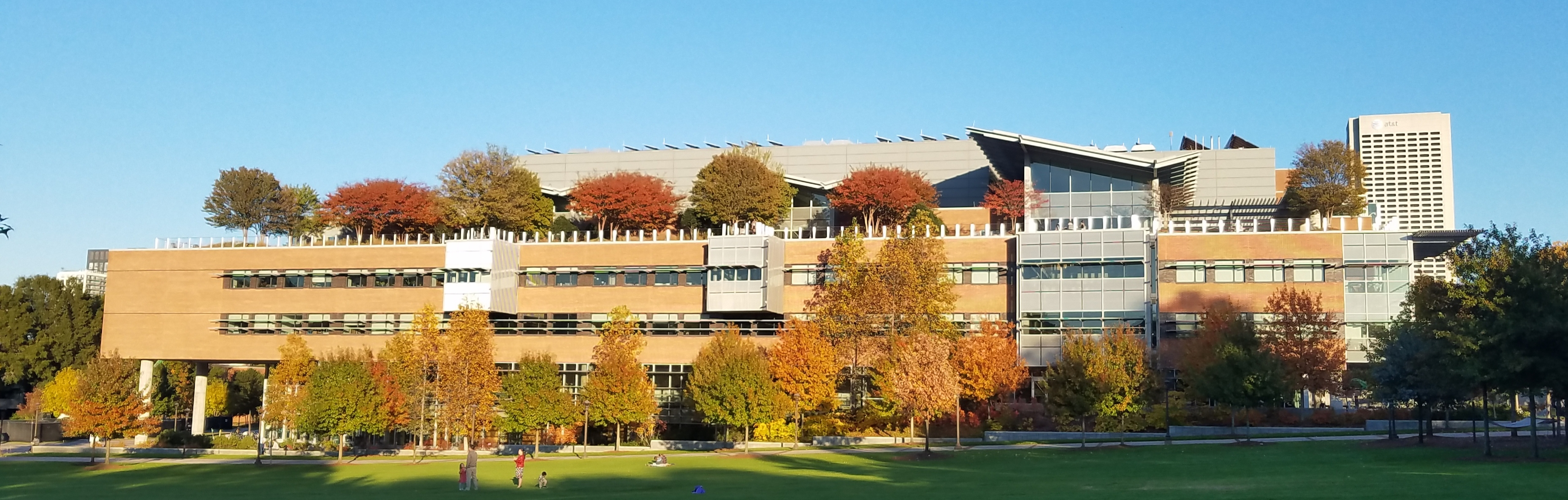
CULC as seen from Tech Green

The Clough Commons is located on a slope between Tech Green and the Georgia Tech Library, providing views of green space and the Kessler Campanile. The site was previously a parking lot. The building is physically connected to the Library on two levels. The Library is responsible for the physical management of the Clough Commons.

== Facilities ==
The Clough Commons aims to enhance cross-disciplinary education by providing a common meeting space for students from different disciplines. It is open 24 hours a day, almost every day of the year. The five-story building offers 220,000 square feet (20,000 m^{2}) of floor space, including a large number of common spaces with 2,100 seats, group study rooms and a central glass atrium.

The building houses many of the facilities for most first-and second-year students at Georgia Tech. It contains 41 classrooms, two 300-seat plus auditoriums, presentation rehearsal studios and all first-year laboratories in biology, physics, chemistry and environmental/atmospheric science. Tutoring services, undergraduate writing assistance, academic advising and the Office of Information Technology are all located in the Clough Commons.

Additional features include a Kaldi's Coffee outlet on the second floor, art exhibit space and an 18,000-square-foot (1,700 m^{2}) rooftop garden with native plants and benches.

== Sustainability ==
The Clough Commons is equipped with the following sustainable features:

=== Solar ===
The Clough Commons includes a rooftop solar panel array for the production of on-site renewable energy. The panels have a rated capacity of approximately 85 kilowatts, capable of producing 118 megawatt-hours of energy per year. The solar panels are supplied by Suniva, a local manufacturing company started by a Georgia Tech professor.

=== Water ===
The Clough Commons includes a number of techniques to maximize water efficiency including water efficient landscaping, a 1.4-million-US-gallon (5,300 m^{3}) cistern, and water harvesting. Water efficient landscaping involves the use of native plants which tend to require less watering than non-native vegetation. In addition, the cistern provides water for flushing toilets and other non-potable water uses. Visible data will reflect the amount of water collected by the cistern, via condensate from HVAC units and harvested using other means (such as rainwater collected on the roof garden).

=== Electrical Usage ===
The Clough Commons uses smart lighting techniques and energy efficient lighting throughout the building, such as daylight harvesting and motion sensors. In addition to the solar array, these techniques affect the overall electrical usage of the building.

=== HVAC ===
Clough Commons was designed to have a healthy indoor environment for users of the facility. This is accomplished by a constant exchange of filtered, fresh air from the outdoors into the building ventilation system. Visible data provided by an integrated building dashboard illustrates the amount of carbon dioxide (in parts per million) inside the building, and compares to outside the building. Using filters and ventilation systems the Clough Commons reduces the amount of carbon dioxide present inside the building, thus creating a healthier indoor environment for users. To reduce energy usage, the mechanical design of the building incorporates a radiant floor heating for tall atrium spaces, an active chilled beam system to provide cooling for lab spaces, an enhanced demand control ventilation system to vary the amount of outdoor air needed for ventilation, an energy recovery ventilator to extract energy from the building exhaust air and precondition the incoming outside air, and a fully enhanced measurement and verification program with numerous sensors on the electrical and mechanical components of the building to allow Georgia Tech to continuously monitor and adjust the building's performance. The measurement and verification program also includes people counters at each perimeter entrance to the building, providing real-time occupancy.
