= S. Price Gilbert =

American judge

Stirling Price Gilbert Sr.
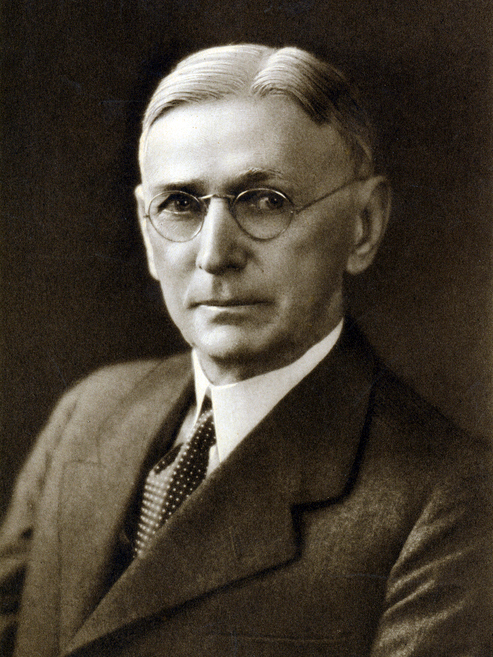
- Born: January 31, 1862; Stewart County, Georgia
- Died: August 28, 1951 (aged 89)
- Education: Vanderbilt University; Yale University

Stirling Price Gilbert Sr. (January 31, 1862 – August 28, 1951) was a lawyer and justice in Georgia.

== Education ==
Gilbert was born on January 31, 1862, in Stewart County, Georgia. In 1883 he graduated from Vanderbilt University with a Bachelor of Science, and in 1885 he graduated from Yale University with a Bachelor of Laws.

== Career ==
Gilbert was admitted to the bar in 1885, and practiced law in Atlanta, Georgia, and Columbus, Georgia. From 1888 to 1893, he was a member of Georgia House of Representatives, and from 1888 to 1893, he was a Georgia superior court judge. 1908-16. From 1916 to 1937, Gilbert was a member of the Supreme Court of Georgia.

From 1943 to 1950, Gilbert served on the Georgia Board of Regents. Gilbert helped establish the Georgia State College for Women, donated funds for the construction of the Gilbert men's infirmary at the University of Georgia, and donated funds towards the design and construction of the S. Price Gilbert Library at the Georgia Institute of Technology, which was completed and dedicated on November 21, 1953.
