= Sheldon M. Wolff =

Sheldon Malcolm Wolff (1930-1994) was a physician and scientist, investigating causes of inflammation.

Wolff earned a bachelor's degree from the University of Georgia in 1952 and a medical degree from Vanderbilt University in 1957. In 1960, he joined the National Institute of Allergy and Infectious Diseases, eventually serving as the clinical director. In 1977, he became chair of the Department of Medicine at Tufts University School of Medicine. He held this position until his death in 1994.

Wolff was elected to the American Academy of Arts and Sciences in 1983.

Wolff died of cancer on February 9, 1994.

He notably trained and mentored many great leaders in his career, including Jerome Kassirer, Anthony Fauci, and former president of the Association of American Medical Colleges, Jordan Cohen.
