= Frank W. Putnam =

American biochemist and academic (1917–2006)

- Born: Frank Poglitsch; August 3, 1917; New Britain, Connecticut
- Died: November 29, 2006 (aged 89)
- Education: Wesleyan University (B.A. 1939, M.A. 1940), University of Minnesota (Ph.D.)
- Known for: Structure and function of blood proteins
- Spouse: Dorothy Linder
- Children: One son; one daughter
- Awards: Guggenheim fellow
- Scientific career
- Institutions: Duke University, University of Chicago, University of Florida, Indiana University, Cambridge University

Frank W. Putnam (born August 3, 1917 – November 29, 2006) was an American biochemist and university professor.

== Early life and education ==
Frank W. Putnam was born August 3, 1917, in New Britain, Connecticut. He attended Wesleyan University, where he received his B.A. in Chemistry in 1939 and an M.A. in Chemistry in 1940. In 1942, he received his PhD in Biochemistry from the University of Minnesota.

== Career ==
Putnam began his career in biochemistry as an instructor at Duke University's School of Medicine from 1942 to 1946. He was an assistant professor in biochemistry at the University of Chicago from 1947 to 1953 and was promoted to associate professor in 1953. In 1955, Putnam was named Head of Biochemistry at the University of Florida, a position he held until 1965. He then moved on to Indiana University to become a professor of biology and the Director of the Division of Biological Sciences. Putnam held the director position until 1969 when he resigned to devote his time to teaching and research. In 1969, he was named Professor of Molecular Biology and Zoology at IU. Putnam was named a Guggenheim fellow in 1970 and researched in the Medical Research Council Laboratory of Molecular Biology at Cambridge University in England. In 1971, he became a professor of biochemistry at the Indiana University Medical School. Putnam reached the status of Distinguished Professor of Molecular Biology and Biochemistry in 1974. He retired in 1987 and was given the title of Distinguished Professor Emeritus by IU in 1988.

Putnam was a member of several professional organizations in the sciences including the National Academy of Sciences and the American Academy of Arts and Sciences. He served as chairman of the Divisional Committee for Institutional Programs of the National Science Foundation. Putnam was a member of the National Advisory General Medical Sciences Council of the National Institutes of Health. In 1967, Putnam was elected chairman of the Division of Biological Chemistry of the American Chemical Society. He was named to the Etiology Program Advisory Committee of the National Cancer Institute in 1970.

== Honors and awards ==
In 1972, Putnam received the Sword of Hope award from the American Cancer Society for his work in basic cancer research. He was awarded an honorary degree from Cambridge University in 1973. Putnam was elected as a fellow of the American Academy of Arts and Sciences in 1974 and as an honorary fellow of the National Academy of Clinical Biochemistry in 1983. In 2013, the Frank W. Putnam Research Fellowship was named in his honor.

== Research ==
Putnam's research focused on the structure and function of blood proteins associated with the development of immunity to disease in animals. His early research involved the development of methods for determining the molecular structure of proteins. Later, Putnam's research focused on the biology and chemistry of bacterial viruses, research that was important in developing molecular biology. The majority of his career dealt with the study of the Bence-Jones proteins and their relation to the molecular structure of antibodies. He is the author of over 100 published scientific articles on these subjects.
