= Carl Gordon =

Carl or Karl Gordon may refer to:

- Carl Gordon (journalist) (1931–2002), Scottish journalist
- Carl Gordon (actor) (1932–2010), American actor
- Karl Gordon, British musician known as K-Gee
- Karl Gordon Henize (1926–1993), American astronomer, space scientist, astronaut and professor
- Karl Gordon Lark (1930–2020), American biologist and professor
