= Petrifilm =

Plating system

Neogen Petrifilm Plates
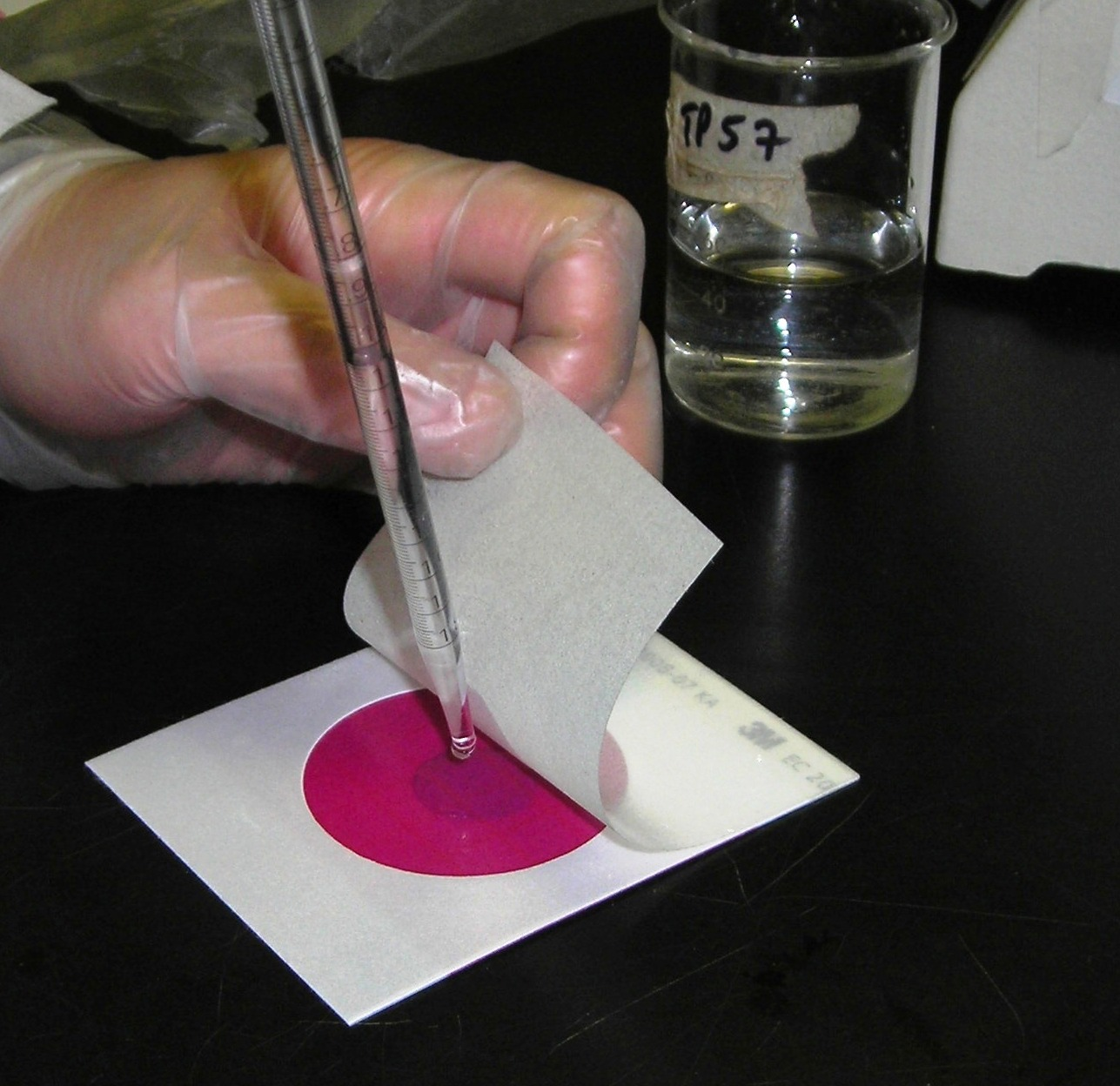
- Inoculating the Petrifilm
- Uses: Culturing
- Manufacturer: Neogen Corporation
- Model: Petrifilm
- Related items: Agar plate Petri dish

The Neogen Petrifilm plate is an all-in-one plating system made by the Food Safety Division of the Neogen Corporation. They are heavily used in many microbiology-related industries and fields to culture various micro-organisms and are meant to be a more efficient method for detection and enumeration compared to conventional plating techniques. A majority of its use is for the testing of foodstuffs.

Petrifilm plates are designed to be as accurate as conventional plating methods. Ingredients usually vary from plate to plate depending on what micro-organism is being cultured, but generally a Petrifilm comprises a cold-water-soluble gelling agent, nutrients, and indicators for activity and enumeration.

A typical Petrifilm plate has a 10 cm(H) × 7.5 cm(W) bottom film which contains a foam barrier accommodating the plating surface, the plating surface itself (a circular area of about 20 cm^{2}), and a top film which encloses the sample within the Petrifilm. A 1 cm × 1 cm yellow grid is printed on the back of the plate to assist enumeration. A plastic “spreader” is also used to spread the inoculum evenly.

== Comparisons between Petrifilm plates and standard methods ==
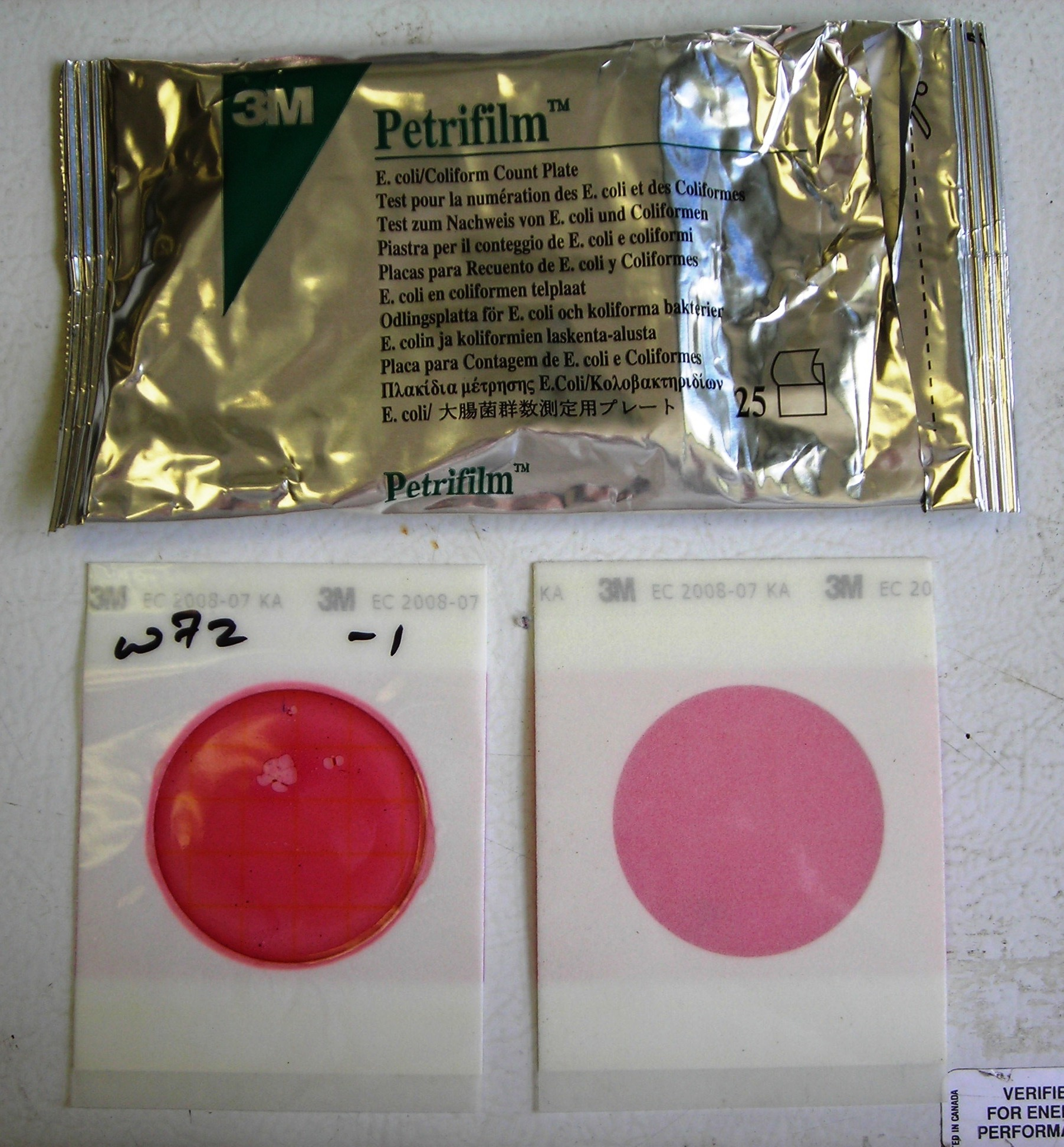
E. Coli/Coliform Petrifilms

Petrifilm plates have become widely used because of their cost-effectiveness, simplicity, convenience, and ease of use. For example, conventional plating would require preparing agar for pour plating, or using agar plates and vial inoculum loops for streak plating; but for Petrifilm plates, the agar is completely housed in a single unit so that only the sample has to be added, which saves time.

For incubation, Petrifilm plates can be safely stacked and incubated just like Petri dishes. Since they are paper thin, more plates can be stacked together than Petri dishes (although it is recommended that Petrifilms be stacked no higher than 20). For enumeration, Petrifilm plates can be used on any colony counter for enumeration just like a Petri dish. Various enumeration experiments have shown very little or no variance between counts obtained through Petrifilm and standard agar counts. In some cases, Petrifilms were more sensitive in detection than standard microbiology methods, other than the case that a higher sensitivity could possibly lead to an increased risk of false positive results.

== Procedure for using Petrifilm plates ==
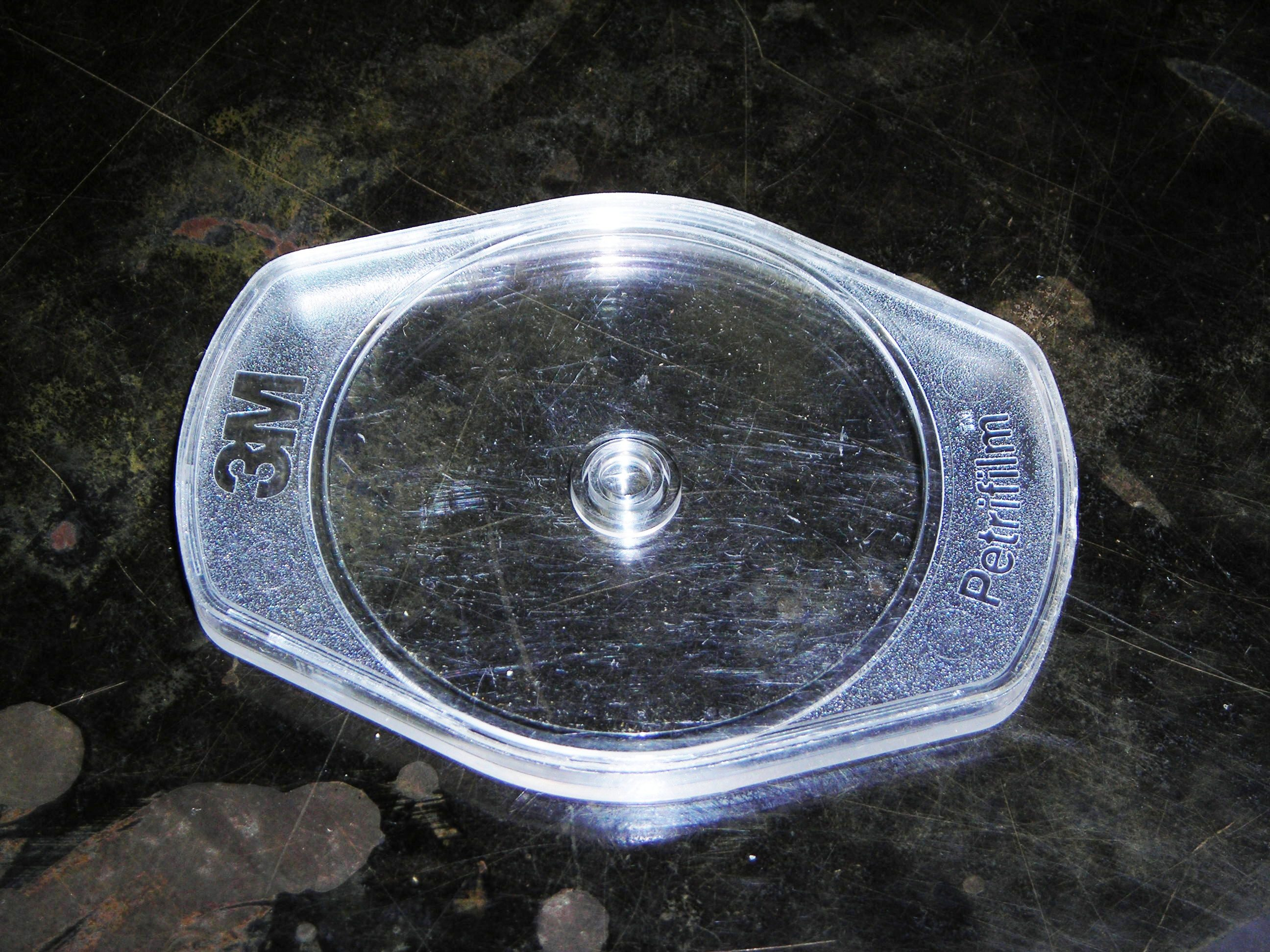
Plastic spreader

First, a sample must be prepared through standard weighing and serial dilution, with stomaching and pH adjustment if necessary. Next, to inoculate, the top layer is lifted to expose the plating surface, and with a pipette, 1mL of the diluted sample is added. The top film is then slowly rolled down and the “spreader” is used for even distribution. It takes a minute for gelling to occur.

== After incubation ==
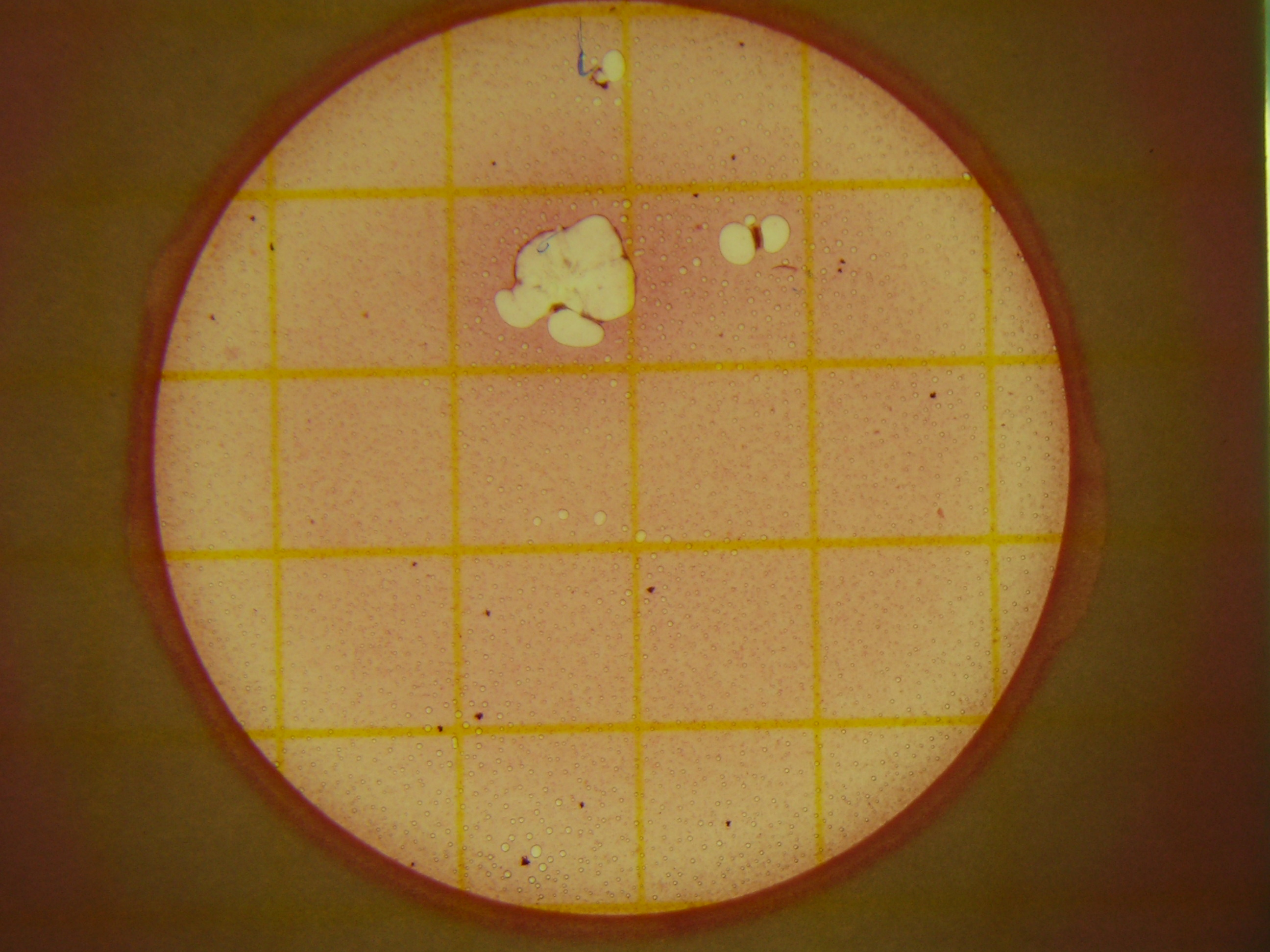
EC Petrifilm which has tested positive for coliforms

After the required incubation period, colonies appear either as splotches, spots which are surrounded by bubbles, or a combination of both, which differ from micro-organism to micro-organism. Enumeration can be done on a standard colony counter. Picking out individual colonies for interpretation can also be done because the top film can be lifted quite effortlessly to expose the gel. Unfortunately, if a sample is too dark in colour (e.g. chocolate or hot chocolate), enumeration becomes more difficult or impossible, since the stained colonies are less visible.

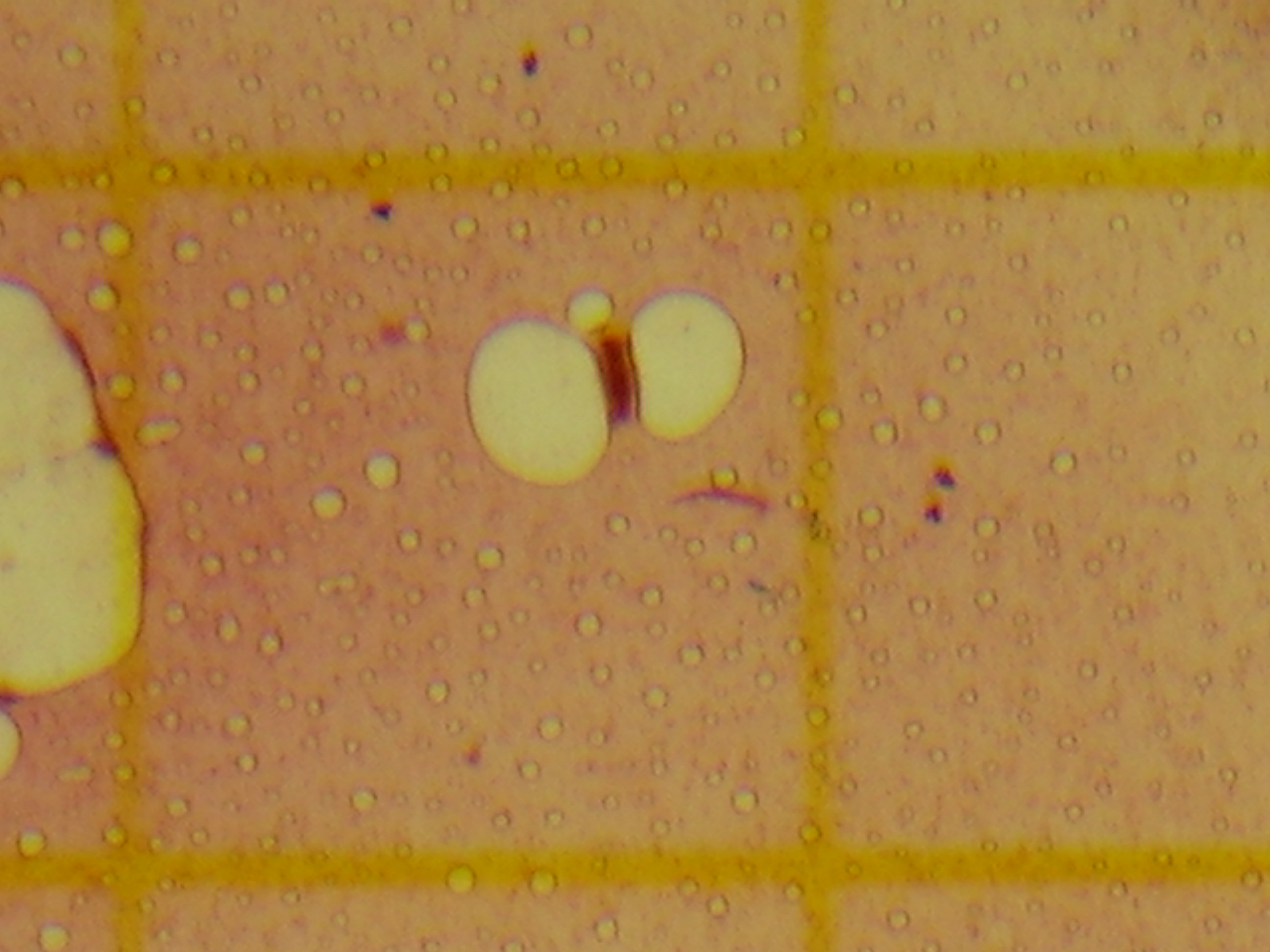
Individual coliform colony from previous picture

== Types of Petrifilm plates ==
- Aerobic plate count
- Aerobic plate count with lactic acid bacteria
- Lactic acid bacteria
- Coliform
- Rapid coliform
- High-Sensitivity coliform
- E. coli / coliform
- Enterobacteriaceae
- Staphylococcus express
- Yeast and mould
- Environmental listeria

== See also ==
- Agar plate
- Agar
- Petri dish
- Neogen Corporation
