= Irwin Gunsalus =

American biochemist (1912–2008)

Irwin C. Gunsalus
- Born: June 29, 1912; Sully County, South Dakota, U.S.
- Died: October 25, 2008 (aged 96); Andalusia, Alabama
- Education: Cornell University
- Known for: Discovery of lipoic acid
- Spouse(s): Merle Lamont Gunsalus, Carolyn Foust Gunsalus, Dorothy Clark Gunsalus
- Children: 7
- Awards: Guggenheim fellowship (1949); Selman A. Waksman Award in Microbiology (1982)
- Scientific career
- Fields: Biochemistry
- Workplaces: Cornell University; University of Illinois at Urbana-Champaign; International Center for Genetic Engineering and Biotechnology
- Doctoral students: Willis A. Wood
- Other notable students: James D. Watson; Ananda Mohan Chakrabarty

Irwin C. "Gunny" Gunsalus (June 29, 1912 – October 25, 2008) was an American biochemist who discovered lipoic acid, a vitamin-like substance (an enzyme cofactor) that has been used as a treatment for chronic liver disease, and pyridoxal phosphate, one of the active forms of vitamin B_{6}. In his role as assistant secretary general at the United Nations, he led the international body's research on genetic engineering.

== Early life ==
Gunsalus was born June 29, 1912, in Sully County, South Dakota, at the homestead of his family farm. His father was killed in a threshing machine accident before Gunsalus started college. He attended South Dakota State University before transferring to Cornell University, where he studied bacteriology, earning a bachelor's degree in 1933, a master's in 1937 and was awarded a doctoral degree in the field in 1940.

== Academic career ==
Gunsalus taught bacteriology from 1940 to 1947 at Cornell University. There he studied issues of food safety and disease risk. From 1947 to 1950, he was a professor of bacteriology at Indiana University. Gunsalus was awarded a Guggenheim Fellowship in 1949 for his work on intermediary metabolism of microorganisms.

In 1950, he took a faculty position as professor of microbiology at the University of Illinois at Urbana-Champaign, shifting his speciality in 1955 to head the biochemistry department until 1966. While there, he co-authored The Bacteria: A Treatise on Structure and Function with Roger Y. Stanier, a five-volume work that served as a basic textbook for scientists entering the field.

In the 1950s, while studying Enterococcus, a lactic acid bacteria found in the gastrointestinal tract, Gunsalus discovered various forms of lipoic acid, as well as pyridoxal phosphate, an active form of vitamin B_{6}, and was granted a patent in 1962 on lipoic acid. In further research, he discovered the role that lipoic acid plays in metabolism, allowing for the more effective use of carbohydrates in the diet. By the 1970s, other researchers and hospitals had begun to use lipoic acid for the treatment of chronic liver disease. It has since been used experimentally to treat pancreatic cancer and its use as a dietary supplement to prevent or delay the onset of Alzheimer's disease and Parkinson's disease has been proposed.

During the 1960s and 1970s, Gunsalus studied Cytochrome P450, researching its role in metabolism in the human liver. His studies led to an understanding of how the family of P-450 proteins and their role in metabolizing natural and man-made compounds.

He also researched the way that soil microbes exchange plasmids, giving the organisms the ability to adapt to differing nutritional substances available in their environment. Gunsalus was a postdoctoral advisor to Ananda Mohan Chakrabarty, who later used genetic engineering techniques for plasmid transfer to create microbes that could digest petroleum.

In February 1967, Gunsalus was one of four scientists who delivered to President Lyndon B. Johnson a petition that had been signed by more than 5,000 scientists demanding an end to the use of biological and chemical weapons in Vietnam. The petition included 17 Nobel Prize-winners and 127 members of the National Academy of Sciences.

== Post-academic career ==
After retiring from the University of Illinois in 1982, Gunsalus was named the founding director of the United Nations International Center for Genetic Engineering and Biotechnology, which is responsible for increasing international cooperation in the development and use of genetic engineering and biotechnology in issues related to development. He oversaw the establishment of research centers in Trieste, Italy and in New Delhi, India. He was later chosen to conduct ecological studies of the Gulf of Mexico for the United States Environmental Protection Agency from 1993 to 2003, where he studied methods for microbiological bioremediation of coastal ecosystems.

Gunsalus was elected to the American Academy of Arts and Sciences, the American Academy of Microbiology. He was also elected to the National Academy of Sciences, where he served as the chairman of the biochemistry section from 1978 to 1981. He was the founding editor of the journal Biochemical and Biophysical Research Communications. In 1982 he was the recipient of the Selman A. Waksman Award in Microbiology from the National Academy of Sciences.

Gunsalus died at age 96 on October 25, 2008, at his home in Andalusia, Alabama, of congestive heart failure.
