= Willis A. Wood =

American microbiologist (1921–2021)

Willis Avery “Woody” Wood (August 6, 1921 – January 17, 2021) was an American microbiology professor, an inventor, and an entrepreneur. He was the president of the American Society for Microbiology in 1980. Wood was known for his research on bacterial enzymes and the molecular biology of sugars and amino acids.

== Biography ==
Wood graduated from high school in Binghamton, New York, and graduated in 1947 with a B.S. in bacteriology from Cornell University. From 1943 to 1946 he served in the U.S. Army as a first lieutenant in the Quartermaster Corps. At Cornell University, Irwin Gunsalus was his faculty advisor. In 1947, Gunsalus moved to Indiana University Bloomington (IU) and Wood followed him to become a graduate student there. In 1950, Wood graduated from IU with a Ph.D. in microbiology. His Ph.D. thesis on the enzymology of Enterococcus faecalis was supervised by Gunsalus. Wood was from 1950 to 1958 a faculty member in the dairy science department of the University of Illinois Urbana-Champaign and from 1958 to 1982 a professor of biochemistry at Michigan State University (MSU) There he played an important role in the formation of the biochemistry department and chaired the department from 1964 to 1974. At MSU, many collaborators after years of research found that adenosine monophosphate (AMP) acts as an allosteric ligand promoting dimerization of the identical subunits of the coenzyme pyridoxal phosphate. Such dimerization greatly decreases the Michaelis constant K_{M} in the Michaelis–Menten kinetics of the dehydratase for L-threonine. This finding was a first in the enzymology of ligand-induced oligomerization.

At Michigan State, Wood developed a recording spectrophotometer with a new photomultiplier arrangement and an automatic cuvette changer that was programmable. This automated system, manufactured by Gilford Instrument Laboratories, Inc., became widely used in research on enzymes. In 1981, Neogen Corporation was founded, with some investment from MSU, to promote biotechnology in Lansing and the rest of Michigan. Wood became Neogen's first president in 1982. From 1982 to 1990, he was the director of microbiology at the Salk Institute Biotechnology Industrial Associates (SIBIA) in La Jolla. Phillips Petroleum Company supported his research on oil recovery enhanced by bacteria. From 1990 to 2019, he was the principal scientist and vice-president of The Agouron Institute, with locations in both San Diego and Pasadena.

In 1955, he received the Eli Lilly and Company-Elanco Research Award.

In 1947, he married Alice Jane Spencer of Nimmonsburg, New York. She died in 1975. In 1976, he married Hazel Katherine (Reiten) LeGrand of Iron Mountain, Michigan. His second wife died in 2012. Upon his death he was survived by three children from his first marriage, four grandchildren, and four great-grandchildren.

== Selected publications ==
- Mortlock, R. P.; Wood, W. A. (1964). "Metabolism of Pentoses and Pentitols by Aerobacter aerogenes I". Journal of Bacteriology. 88 (4): 838–844. doi:10.1128/jb.88.4.838-844.1964. PMC 314822. PMID 14219044.
- Mortlock, R. P.; Fossitt, D. D.; Wood, W. A. (1965). "A basis for utlization of unnatural pentoses and pentitols by Aerobacter aerogenes". Proceedings of the National Academy of Sciences. 54 (2): 572–579. Bibcode:1965PNAS...54..572M. doi:10.1073/pnas.54.2.572. PMC 219706. PMID 5217444.
- Wood, W. A. (1966). "Carbohydrate Metabolism". Annual Review of Biochemistry. 35: 521–558. doi:10.1146/annurev.bi.35.070166.002513. PMID 5329468.
- Hollaender, Alexander, ed. (6 December 2012). "Basic Biology of Microbial Fermentation by Willis A. Wood". Trends in the Biology of Fermentations for Fuels and Chemicals (Proceedings of a symposium of trends in the biology of fermentation for fuels and chemicals held December 7–11, 1980, at Brookhaven National Laboratory, Upton, New York). Basic Life Science, volume 18. Springer. pp. 3–17. ISBN 9781468439809; pbk reprint
- Bishop, David F.; Kitchen, Hyram; Wood, Willis A. (1981). "Evidence for erythroid and nonerythroid forms of δ-aminolevulinate synthetase". Archives of Biochemistry and Biophysics. 206 (2): 380–391. doi:10.1016/0003-9861(81)90105-3. PMID 7224646.
- Davey, Mary E.; Wood, Willis A.; Key, Rebekah; Nakamura, Kanji; Stahl, David A. (1993). "Isolation of Three Species of Geotoga and Petrotoga: Two New Genera, Representing a New Lineage in the Bacterial Line of Descent Distantly Related to the "Thermotogales"". Systematic and Applied Microbiology. 16 (2): 191–200. doi:10.1016/S0723-2020(11)80467-4.
- Davey, Mary E.; Gevertz, Diane; Wood, Willis A.; Clark, James B.; Jenneman, Gary E. (1998). "Microbial selective plugging of sandstone through stimulation of indigenous bacteria in a hypersaline oil reservoir". Geomicrobiology Journal. 15 (4): 335–352. Bibcode:1998GmbJ...15..335D. doi:10.1080/01490459809378087.
