= Eli Lilly and Company-Elanco Research Award =

The Eli Lilly and Company-Elanco Research Award was a scientific award presented annually by the American Society for Microbiology (ASM) and sponsored by the Eli Lilly and Company and its subsidiary Elanco (which became an independent company in 2019).

The prize was first awarded in 1936. Recipients were given 5000 US dollars (as of 2011). It honored young scientists under the age of 45. The award's purpose was not to compare the research of the younger scientists to the research of older scientists, but to encourage originality and independent thinking.

The award was discontinued after the last award in 2018. Information about the award can no longer be found on the ASM website.

== Recipients ==
The following people received the Eli Lilly and Company-Elanco Research Award:

- 1936 Harry Eagle
- 1937 Frank L. Horsfall
- 1938 Jerome T. Syverton
- 1939 John G. Kidd
- 1940 D. Wayne Woolley
- 1941 Alwin M. Pappenheimer
- 1942 Harland G. Wood
- 1945 Esmond E. Snell
- 1946 Maclyn McCarty
- 1947 Wayne W. Umbreit
- 1948 Alan W. Bernheimer
- 1949 Elvin A. Kabat
- 1950 Roger Y. Stanier
- 1951 Seymour S. Cohen
- 1952 J. Oliver Lampen
- 1953 Joshua Lederberg (Nobel Prize in Physiology or Medicine, 1958)
- 1954 James W. Moulder
- 1955 Willis A. Wood
- 1956 Melvin Cohn
- 1957 Henry Koffler
- 1958 W. Wilbur Ackermann
- 1959 Charles Yanofsky
- 1960 Wallace P. Rowe
- 1961 Harry Rubin
- 1962 Norton D. Zinder
- 1963 John J. Holland
- 1964 Matthew Meselson
- 1965 Karl Gordon Lark
- 1966 Frederick C. Neidhardt
- 1967 Brian J. McCarthy
- 1968 John J. Cebra
- 1969 David Schlessinger
- 1970 Jonathan R. Beckwith
- 1971 David L. Baltimore (Nobel Prize in Physiology or Medicine, 1975)
- 1972 R. John Collier
- 1973 Leland H. Hartwell (Nobel Prize in Physiology or Medicine, 2001)
- 1974 Joseph R. Kates
- 1975 G. Wesley Hatfield
- 1976 Ronald W. Davis
- 1977 Alice S. Huang
- 1978 David L. Botstein
- 1979 Winston J. Brill
- 1980 Edward M. Scolnick
- 1981 Tom Maniatis
- 1982 Thomas E. Shenk
- 1983 Ira Herskowitz
- 1984 Linda L. Randall
- 1985 Martha M. Howe
- 1986 Mark M. Davis
- 1987 Randy W. Schekman (Nobel Prize in Physiology or Medicine, 2013)
- 1988 Elizabeth H. Blackburn (Nobel Prize in Physiology or Medicine, 2009)
- 1989 Steven L. McKnight
- 1990 Kevin Struhl
- 1991 John J. Mekalanos
- 1992 Vincent Racaniello
- 1993 Ralph Isberg
- 1994 David H. Beach
- 1995 John J. Monaco
- 1996 Daniel A. Portnoy
- 1997 Alan D. Grossman
- 1998 Scott J. Hultgren
- 1999 John A. T. Young
- 2000 Gisela Storz
- 2001 Tania A. Baker
- 2002 Andrew Camilli
- 2003 Angelika Amon
- 2004 Adrian R. Ferré-D'Amaré
- 2005 Ronald R. Breaker
- 2006 Bonnie Lynn Bassler
- 2007 Craig Russell Roy
- 2008 Dianne K. Newman
- 2009 Joseph L. DeRisi
- 2010 Paul Bieniasz
- 2011 Christine Jacobs-Wagner
- 2012 Akiko Iwasaki
- 2013 Martin Polz
- 2014 Katherine A. Fitzgerald
- 2015 Vanessa Sperandio
- 2016 Erica Ollmann Saphire
- 2017 Harmit Malik
- 2018 Thirumala-Devi Kanneganti
