= James Watson =

American biologist (1928–2025)

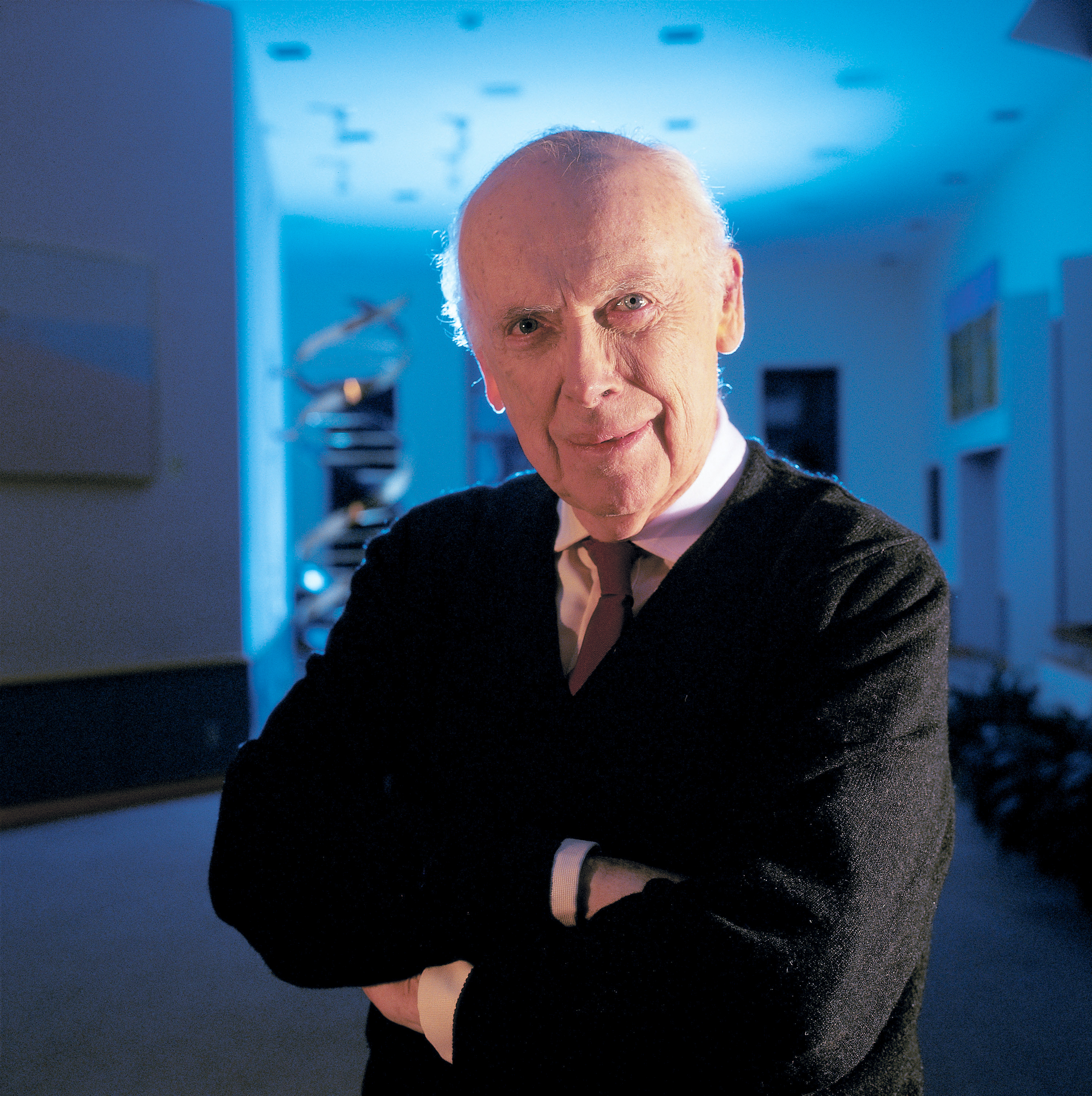
- Watson in 2000s
- Born: April 6, 1928; Chicago, Illinois, U.S.
- Died: November 6, 2025 (aged 97); East Northport, New York, U.S.
- Education: University of Chicago (BS); Indiana University Bloomington (PhD)
- Known for: DNA structure; molecular biology
- Spouse: Elizabeth Lewis (m. 1968)
- Children: 2
- Awards: Albert Lasker Award for Basic Medical Research (1960); Nobel Prize in Physiology or Medicine (1962); John J. Carty Award (1971); Copley Medal (1993); Lomonosov Gold Medal (1994)
- Scientific career
- Fields: Genetics
- Workplaces: See list: Indiana University; Cold Spring Harbor Laboratory; Laboratory of Molecular Biology; Harvard University; California Institute of Technology; University of Cambridge; National Institutes of Health
- Thesis: The Biological Properties of X‑Ray Inactivated Bacteriophage (1951)
- Doctoral advisor: Salvador Luria
- Doctoral students: Mario Capecchi; Bob Horvitz; Peter B. Moore; David Schlessinger; Joan Steitz
- Other notable students: See list: Ewan Birney; Ronald W. Davis (postdoc); Phillip Allen Sharp (postdoc); Richard J. Roberts (postdoc); John Tooze (postdoc); Chen Lan-bo (postdoc); Nancy Hopkins (postdoc)

James Dewey Watson (April 6, 1928 – November 6, 2025) was an American molecular biologist, geneticist, and zoologist. In 1953, he and Francis Crick co-authored an academic paper on DNA entitled, "Molecular Structure of Nucleic Acids: A Structure for Deoxyribose Nucleic Acid". Published in the scientific journal Nature, the paper proposed the existence of the double helix structure of the DNA molecule, having built on research by Rosalind Franklin and Raymond Gosling. In 1962, the Nobel Prize in Physiology or Medicine was awarded to Watson, Crick, and Maurice Wilkins "for their discoveries concerning the molecular structure of nucleic acids and its significance for information transfer in living material".

Watson graduated from the University of Chicago in 1947 and received his doctorate from Indiana University Bloomington three years later. After a post-doctoral year at the University of Copenhagen with Herman Kalckar and Ole Maaløe, Watson worked at the University of Cambridge's Cavendish Laboratory in England, where he met his future collaborator Francis Crick. From 1956 to 1976, Watson was employed by the faculty of the Harvard University Biology Department, promoting research in molecular biology.

From 1968, Watson served as the director of the Cold Spring Harbor Laboratory (CSHL) in Laurel Hollow, New York, greatly expanding its level of funding and research. At CSHL, he shifted his research emphasis to the study of cancer, along with making it a world-leading research center in molecular biology. In 1994, Watson started as president and served for 10 years. He was then appointed chancellor, serving until his resignation in 2007 after making comments claiming that there is a genetic link between race and intelligence. In 2019, after the broadcast of a documentary where Watson reiterated these views on race and genetics, CSHL revoked his honorary titles and severed all ties with him.

Watson wrote many science books, including the textbook Molecular Biology of the Gene (1965) and his bestselling book The Double Helix (1968). He made derogatory comments about Rosalind Franklin, who had been responsible for gathering data that led to the discovery of the structure of DNA, and was criticized for misogyny. Between 1988 and 1992, Watson was associated with the National Institutes of Health, helping to establish the Human Genome Project, which completed the task of mapping the human genome in 2003.

== Early life and education ==
James Dewey Watson was born in Chicago on April 6, 1928, the only son of Jean (née Mitchell) and James D. Watson, a businessman descended mostly from colonial English immigrants to America. His maternal grandfather, Lauchlin Mitchell, a tailor, was from Glasgow, Scotland, and his maternal grandmother, Lizzie Gleason, was the child of parents from County Tipperary, Ireland. Watson's mother was a modestly religious Catholic and his father an Episcopalian who had lost his belief in God. Watson grew up Catholic, but he later described himself as "an escapee from the Catholic religion". Watson said, "The luckiest thing that ever happened to me was that my father didn't believe in God." By age 11, Watson stopped attending mass and embraced the "pursuit of scientific and humanistic knowledge."

Watson grew up on the South Side of Chicago and attended public schools, including Horace Mann Elementary School and South Shore High School. He was fascinated with bird watching, a hobby shared with his father, so Watson considered majoring in ornithology. He appeared on Quiz Kids, a popular radio show that challenged bright youngsters to answer questions. Thanks to the liberal policy of university president Robert Hutchins, Watson enrolled at the University of Chicago, where he was awarded a tuition scholarship at age 15. Among his professors was Louis Leon Thurstone, from whom Watson learned about factor analysis, which he later referenced on his controversial views on race.

After reading Erwin Schrödinger's book What Is Life? in 1946, Watson changed his professional ambitions from the study of ornithology to genetics. Watson earned his Bachelor of Science degree in zoology from the University of Chicago the following year. In his autobiography, Avoid Boring People, Watson described the University of Chicago as an "idyllic academic institution where [he] was instilled with the capacity for critical thought and an ethical compulsion not to suffer fools who impeded his search for truth", in contrast to his description of later experiences. In 1947, Watson left the University of Chicago to become a graduate student at Indiana University, attracted by the presence at Bloomington of the 1946 Nobel Prize winner Hermann Joseph Muller, who in crucial papers published in 1922, 1929, and in the 1930s had laid out all the basic properties of the heredity molecule that Schrödinger presented in his 1944 book. Watson received his Doctor of Philosophy degree from Indiana University Bloomington in 1950; Salvador Luria was his doctoral advisor.

== Career and research ==
=== Luria, Delbrück, and the Phage Group ===
Originally, Watson was drawn into molecular biology by the work of Salvador Luria. Luria eventually shared the 1969 Nobel Prize in Physiology or Medicine for his work on the Luria–Delbrück experiment, which concerned the nature of genetic mutations. He was part of a distributed group of researchers who were making use of the viruses that infect bacteria, called bacteriophages. He and Max Delbrück were among the leaders of this new "Phage Group", an important movement of geneticists from experimental systems such as Drosophila towards microbial genetics. Early in 1948, Watson began his PhD research in Luria's laboratory at Indiana University. That spring, he met Delbrück first in Luria's apartment and again that summer during Watson's first trip to the Cold Spring Harbor Laboratory.

The Phage Group was the intellectual medium where Watson became a working scientist. Importantly, the members of the Phage Group sensed that they were on the path to discovering the physical nature of the gene. In 1949, Watson took a course with Felix Haurowitz that included the conventional view of that time: that genes were proteins and able to replicate themselves. The other major molecular component of chromosomes, DNA, was widely considered to be a "stupid tetranucleotide", serving only a structural role to support the proteins. Even at this early time, Watson, under the influence of the Phage Group, was aware of the Avery–MacLeod–McCarty experiment, which suggested that DNA was the genetic molecule. Watson's research project involved using X-rays to inactivate bacterial viruses.

Watson then went to Copenhagen University in September 1950 for a year of postdoctoral research, first heading to the laboratory of biochemist Herman Kalckar. Kalckar was interested in the enzymatic synthesis of nucleic acids, and he wanted to use phages as an experimental system. Watson wanted to explore the structure of DNA, and his interests did not coincide with Kalckar's. After working part of the year with Kalckar, Watson spent the remainder of his time in Copenhagen conducting experiments with microbial physiologist Ole Maaløe, then a member of the Phage Group.

The experiments, of which Watson became aware at the previous summer's Cold Spring Harbor phage conference, employed radioactive phosphate as a tracer to identify which molecular components of bacteriophage particles are responsible for infecting the host bacteria during viral entry. The intention was to determine whether protein or DNA was the genetic material, but upon consultation with Max Delbrück, they determined that their results were inconclusive and could not specifically identify the newly labeled molecules as DNA. Watson never developed a constructive interaction with Kalckar, but he did accompany Kalckar to a meeting in Italy, where Watson saw Maurice Wilkins talk about X-ray diffraction data for DNA. Watson had become firmly convinced that DNA possessed a distinct molecular structure amenable to precise elucidation.

In 1951, the chemists Linus Pauling, Robert Corey and Herman Branson in California published their model of the amino acid alpha helix, a result that grew out of their efforts in X-ray crystallography and molecular model building. After obtaining some results from his phage and other experimental research conducted at Indiana University, Statens Serum Institut (Denmark), CSHL, and the California Institute of Technology, Watson now had the desire to learn to perform X-ray diffraction experiments so he could work to determine the structure of DNA. That summer, Luria met John Kendrew, and he arranged for a new postdoctoral research project for Watson in England. In 1951, Watson visited the Stazione Zoologica Anton Dohrn in Naples.

=== Identifying the double helix ===
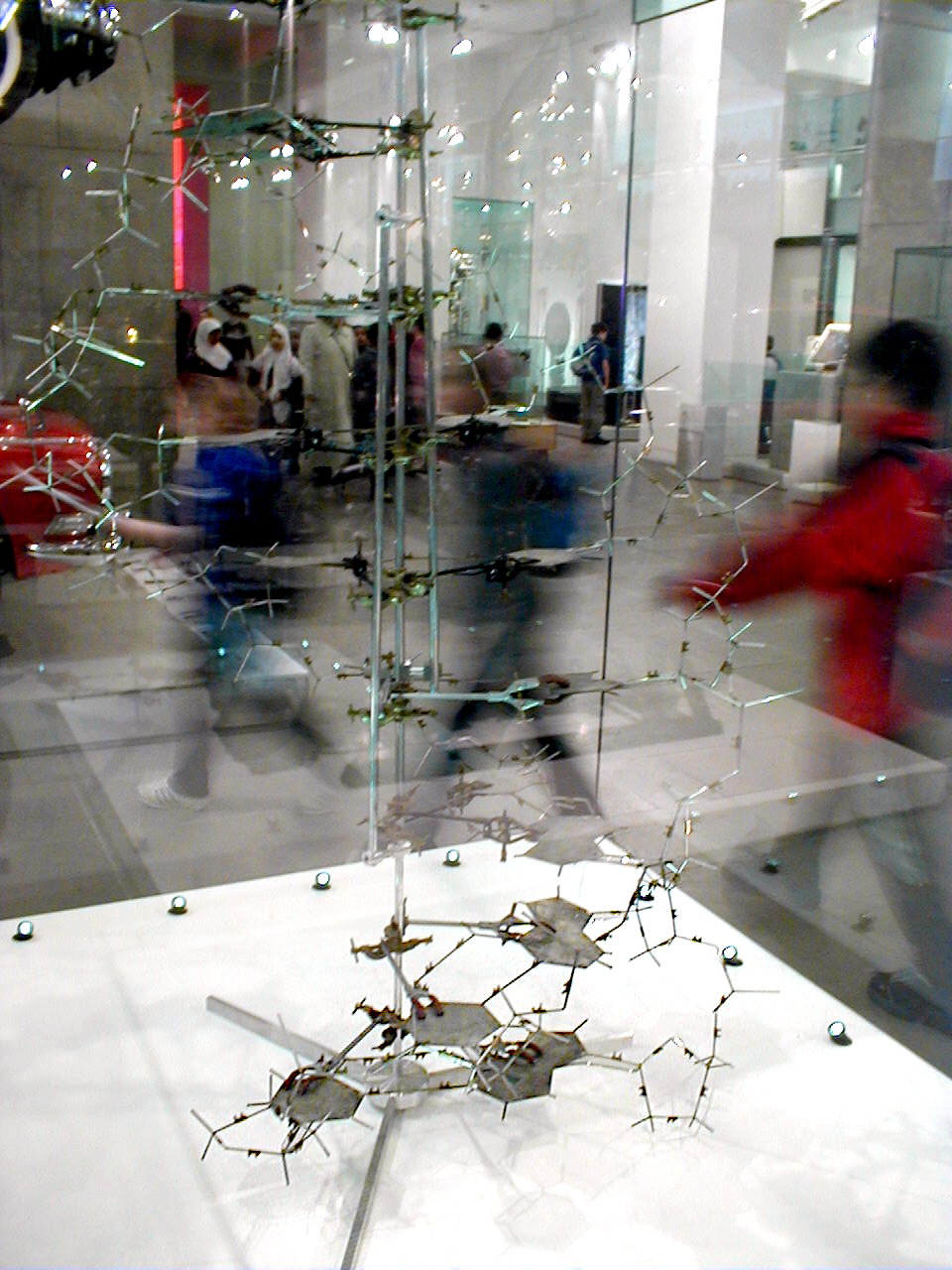
DNA model built by Crick and Watson in 1953, in the Science Museum, London

In mid-March 1953, Watson and Crick deduced the double helix structure of DNA. Crucial to their discovery were the experimental data collected at King's College London—mainly by Rosalind Franklin, and for which they did not provide proper attribution. Sir Lawrence Bragg, the director of the Cavendish Laboratory (where Watson and Crick worked), made the original announcement of the discovery at a Solvay conference on proteins in Belgium on April 8, 1953; it went unreported by the press. Watson and Crick submitted a paper entitled "Molecular Structure of Nucleic Acids: A Structure for Deoxyribose Nucleic Acid" to the scientific journal Nature, which was published on April 25, 1953.

In April 1953, Sydney Brenner, Jack Dunitz, Dorothy Hodgkin, Leslie Orgel, and Beryl M. Oughton were some of the first people to see the model of the structure of DNA, constructed by Crick and Watson; at the time, they were working at Oxford University's chemistry department. All were impressed by the new DNA model, especially Brenner, who subsequently worked with Crick at Cambridge in the Cavendish Laboratory and the new Laboratory of Molecular Biology. According to the late Beryl Oughton, later Rimmer, they all travelled together in two cars once Hodgkin announced to them that they were off to Cambridge to see the model of the structure of DNA.

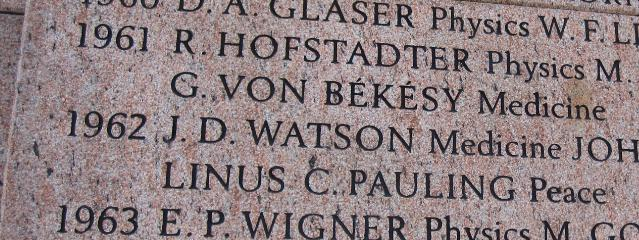
Watson's name on New York City's Nobel Monument; it lists American laureates only, not Crick and Wilkins who shared the 1962 Nobel Prize in Physiology or Medicine

The Cambridge University student newspaper Varsity ran its own short article on the discovery on May 30, 1953. Watson subsequently presented a paper on the double-helical structure of DNA at the 18th Cold Spring Harbor Symposium on Viruses in early June 1953, six weeks after the publication of the Watson and Crick paper in Nature. Many at the meeting had not yet heard of the discovery. The 1953 Cold Spring Harbor Symposium was the first opportunity for many to see the model of the DNA double helix. Watson, Crick, and Wilkins were awarded the Nobel Prize in Physiology or Medicine in 1962 for their research on the structure of nucleic acids. Rosalind Franklin had died in 1958 and was therefore ineligible for nomination. The publication of the double helix structure of DNA has been described as a turning point in science; understanding of life was fundamentally changed and the modern era of biology began.

==== Interactions with Rosalind Franklin and Raymond Gosling ====
Watson and Crick's use of DNA X-ray diffraction data collected by Rosalind Franklin and her student Raymond Gosling attracted scrutiny. It has been argued that Watson and his colleagues did not properly acknowledge Franklin for her contributions to the discovery of the double helix structure. Robert P. Crease notes that "Such stingy behaviour may not be unknown, or even uncommon, among scientists". Franklin's high-quality X-ray diffraction patterns of DNA were unpublished results, which Watson and Crick used without her knowledge or consent in their construction of the double helix model of DNA. Franklin's results provided estimates of the water content of DNA crystals and these results were consistent with the two sugar-phosphate backbones being on the outside of the molecule. Franklin told Crick and Watson that the backbones had to be on the outside; before then, Linus Pauling and Watson and Crick had erroneous models with the chains inside and the bases pointing outwards. Her identification of the space group for DNA crystals revealed to Crick that the two DNA strands were antiparallel.

The X-ray diffraction images collected by Gosling and Franklin provided the best evidence for the helical nature of DNA. Watson and Crick had three sources for Franklin's unpublished data:

1. Her 1951 seminar, attended by Watson;
2. Discussions with Wilkins, who worked in the same laboratory with Franklin;
3. A research progress report that was intended to promote coordination of Medical Research Council-supported laboratories. Watson, Crick, Wilkins and Franklin all worked in MRC laboratories.

In a 1954 article, Watson and Crick acknowledged that, without Franklin's data, "the formulation of our structure would have been most unlikely, if not impossible". In The Double Helix, Watson later admitted that "Rosy, of course, did not directly give us her data. For that matter, no one at King's realized they were in our hands". In recent years, Watson garnered controversy in the popular and scientific press for his "misogynist treatment" of Franklin and his failure to properly attribute her work on DNA. According to one critic, Watson's portrayal of Franklin in The Double Helix was negative, giving the impression that she was Wilkins' assistant and was unable to interpret her own DNA data. Watson's accusation was indefensible since Franklin told Crick and Watson that the helix backbones had to be on the outside. From a 2003 piece by Brenda Maddox in Nature:

Other comments dismissive of "Rosy" in Watson's book caught the attention of the emerging women's movement in the late 1960s. "Clearly Rosy had to go or be put in her place ... Unfortunately Maurice could not see any decent way to give Rosy the boot". And, "Certainly a bad way to go out into the foulness of a ... November night was to be told by a woman to refrain from venturing an opinion about a subject for which you were not trained."

Robert P. Crease remarks that "[Franklin] was close to figuring out the structure of DNA, but did not do it. The title of 'discoverer' goes to those who first fit the pieces together". Jeremy Bernstein rejects that Franklin was a "victim" and states that "[Watson and Crick] made the double-helix scheme work. It is as simple as that". Matthew Cobb and Nathaniel C. Comfort write that "Franklin was no victim in how the DNA double helix was solved" but that she was "an equal contributor to the solution of the structure".

A review of the correspondence from Franklin to Watson, in the archives at CSHL, revealed that the two scientists later exchanged constructive scientific correspondence. Franklin consulted with Watson on her tobacco mosaic virus RNA research. Franklin's letters were framed with the normal and unremarkable forms of address, beginning with "Dear Jim", and concluding with "Best Wishes, Yours, Rosalind". Each of the scientists published their own unique contributions to the discovery of the structure of DNA in separate articles, and all of the contributors published their findings in the same volume of Nature. These classic molecular biology papers are identified as: Watson J. D. and Crick F. H. C. "A Structure for Deoxyribose Nucleic Acid". Nature 171, 737–738 (1953); Wilkins M. H. F., Stokes A. R. & Wilson H. R. "Molecular Structure of Deoxypentose Nucleic Acids". Nature 171, 738–740 (1953); Franklin R. and Gosling R. G. "Molecular Configuration in Sodium Thymonucleate". Nature 171, 740–741 (1953).

=== Harvard University ===
In 1956, Watson accepted a position in the biology department at Harvard University in Cambridge, Massachusetts. His work at Harvard focused on RNA and its role in the transfer of genetic information. He continued to be a member of the Harvard faculty until 1976, even though he took over the directorship of Cold Spring Harbor Laboratory eight years prior.

During his tenure at Harvard, Watson participated in a protest against the Vietnam War, leading a group of 12 biologists and biochemists calling for "the immediate withdrawal of U.S. forces from Vietnam." In 1975, on the thirtieth anniversary of the bombing of Hiroshima, Watson was one of over 2,000 scientists and engineers who spoke out against nuclear proliferation to President Gerald Ford, arguing that there was no proven method for the safe disposal of radioactive waste, and that nuclear plants were a security threat due to the possibility of terrorist theft of plutonium.

Watson's first textbook, The Molecular Biology of the Gene, used the concept of heads—brief declarative subheadings. His next textbook was Molecular Biology of the Cell, in which he coordinated the work of a group of scientist-writers. His third was Recombinant DNA, which described the ways in which genetic engineering had brought new information about how organisms function.

=== Publishing The Double Helix ===
In 1968, Watson wrote The Double Helix, listed by the board of the Modern Library as number seven in their list of 100 Best Nonfiction books. The book details the story of the discovery of the structure of DNA, as well as the personalities, conflicts and controversy surrounding their work, and includes many of his private emotional impressions at the time. Watson's original title was to have been "Honest Jim". Controversy surrounded the publication of the book. Watson's book was originally to be published by the Harvard University Press, but Francis Crick and Maurice Wilkins, among others, objected. Watson's home university dropped the project and the book was commercially published. In an interview with Anne Sayre for her book, Rosalind Franklin and DNA (published in 1975 and reissued in 2000), Francis Crick said that he regarded Watson's book as a "contemptible pack of damned nonsense".

=== Cold Spring Harbor Laboratory ===
In 1968, Watson was appointed director of the Cold Spring Harbor Laboratory. He and his wife, Elizabeth, had two sons between 1970 and 1972, and by 1974 the family had established a permanent residence in Cold Spring Harbor. Watson led the laboratory as director and president for approximately 35 years, subsequently serving as its chancellor and, later, chancellor emeritus.

In his roles as director, president, and chancellor, Watson led CSHL to articulate its present-day mission, "dedication to exploring molecular biology and genetics in order to advance the understanding and ability to diagnose and treat cancers, neurological diseases, and other causes of human suffering." Cold Spring Harbor Laboratory substantially expanded both its research and its science educational programs under Watson's direction. He is credited with "transforming a small facility into one of the world's great education and research institutions. Initiating a program to study the cause of human cancer, scientists under his direction have made major contributions to understanding the genetic basis of cancer." The CSHL group investigating tumor viruses assembled by Watson was particularly successful. In a retrospective summary of Watson's accomplishments there, Bruce Stillman, the laboratory's president, said, "Jim Watson created a research environment that is unparalleled in the world of science."

In 2007, Watson said, "I turned against the left wing because they don't like genetics, because genetics implies that sometimes in life we fail because we have bad genes. They want all failure in life to be due to the evil system."

=== Human Genome Project ===
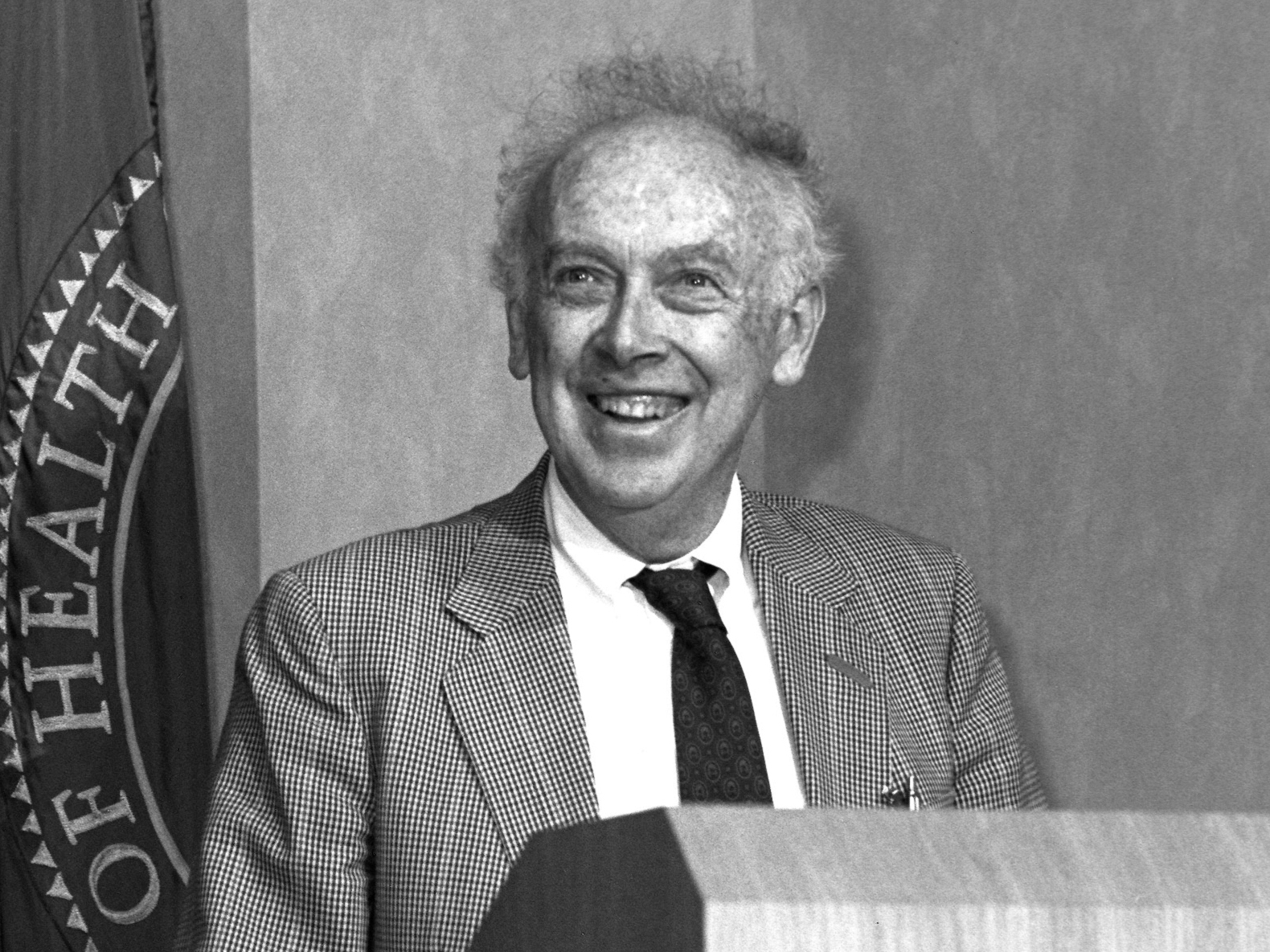
Watson in 1992

In 1990, Watson was appointed as the head of the Human Genome Project at the National Institutes of Health, a position he held until April 10, 1992. Watson left the Genome Project after conflicts with the new NIH Director, Bernadine Healy. He was opposed to Healy's attempts to acquire patents on gene sequences, and any ownership of the "laws of nature". Two years before stepping down from the Genome Project, Watson had stated his own opinion on this long and ongoing controversy which he saw as an illogical barrier to research; Watson said, "The nations of the world must see that the human genome belongs to the world's people, as opposed to its nations." He left within weeks of the 1992 announcement that the NIH would be applying for patents on brain-specific cDNAs. (The issue of the patentability of genes has since been resolved in the US by the US Supreme Court; see Association for Molecular Pathology v. U.S. Patent and Trademark Office.)

In 1994, Watson became president of Cold Spring Harbor Laboratory. Francis Collins took over the role as director of the Human Genome Project. In 1997, Watson was quoted in The Sunday Telegraph, stating: "If you could find the gene which determines sexuality and a woman decides she doesn't want a homosexual child, well, let her." The biologist Richard Dawkins wrote a letter to The Independent claiming that Watson's position was misrepresented by The Sunday Telegraph article, and that Watson would equally consider the possibility of having a heterosexual child to be just as valid as any other reason for abortion, to emphasize that Watson is in favor of allowing choice.

On the issue of obesity, Watson was quoted in 2000, saying: "Whenever you interview fat people, you feel bad, because you know you're not going to hire them." Watson repeatedly supported genetic screening and genetic engineering in public lectures and interviews, arguing that stupidity is a disease and the "really stupid" bottom 10% of people should be cured. He also suggested that beauty could be genetically engineered, saying in 2003, "People say it would be terrible if we made all girls pretty. I think it would be great."

In 2007, Watson became the second person (after Craig Venter) to publish his fully sequenced genome online, after it was presented to him on May 31 by 454 Life Sciences Corporation in collaboration with scientists at the Human Genome Sequencing Center, Baylor College of Medicine. Watson was quoted as saying, "I am putting my genome sequence on line to encourage the development of an era of personalized medicine, in which information contained in our genomes can be used to identify and prevent disease and to create individualized medical therapies".

=== Later life ===
In 2014, Watson published a paper in The Lancet suggesting that biological oxidants may have a different role than is thought in diseases including diabetes, dementia, heart disease and cancer. For example, type 2 diabetes is usually thought to be caused by oxidation in the body that causes inflammation and kills off pancreatic cells. Watson thought the root of that inflammation was different: "a lack of biological oxidants, not an excess", and discussed this in detail. One critical response was that the idea was neither new nor worthy of merit, and that The Lancet published Watson's paper only because of his name. Other scientists expressed their support for his hypothesis and proposed that it could also be expanded to why a lack of oxidants can result in cancer and its progression.

In 2014, Watson sold his Nobel Prize medal to raise money after complaining of being made an "unperson" following controversial statements he had made. Part of the funds raised by the sale went to support scientific research. The medal sold at auction at Christie's in December 2014 for US$4.1 million. Watson intended to contribute the proceeds to conservation work on Long Island and to funding research at Trinity College, Dublin. He was the first living Nobel recipient to auction a medal. The medal was later returned to Watson by the purchaser, Alisher Usmanov.

=== Notable former students ===
Several of Watson's former doctoral students subsequently became notable in their own right including, Mario Capecchi, Bob Horvitz, Peter B. Moore and Joan Steitz. Besides numerous PhD students, Watson also supervised postdoctoral researchers and other interns including Ewan Birney, Ronald W. Davis, Phillip Allen Sharp (postdoc), John Tooze (postdoc), and Richard J. Roberts (postdoc).

=== Other affiliations ===
Watson was a member of the Board of Directors of United Biomedical, Inc., founded by Chang Yi Wang. He held the position for six years and retired from the board in 1999. In January 2007, Watson accepted the invitation of Leonor Beleza, president of the Champalimaud Foundation, to become the head of the foundation's scientific council, an advisory organ.

In March 2017, Watson was named head consultant of the Cheerland Investment Group, a Chinese investment company which sponsored his trip. He was an institute adviser for the Allen Institute for Brain Science.

=== Avoid Boring People ===
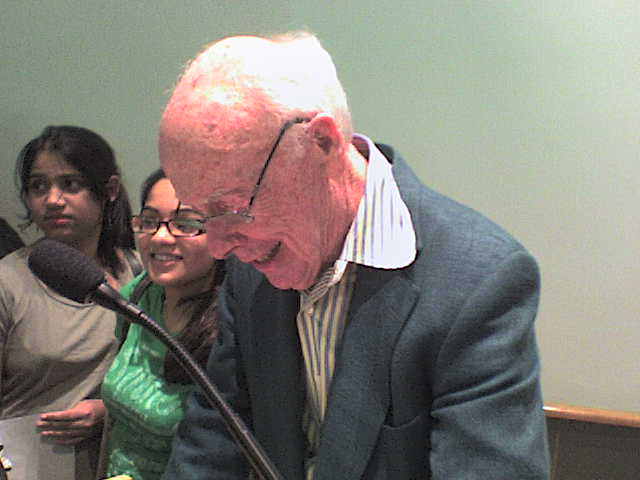
Watson signing autographs after a speech at Cold Spring Harbor Laboratory on April 30, 2007

Watson had disagreements with Craig Venter regarding his use of EST fragments while Venter worked at National Institutes of Health. Venter went on to found Celera genomics and continued his feud with Watson. Watson was quoted as calling Venter "Hitler".

In his 2007 memoir, Avoid Boring People: Lessons from a Life in Science, Watson describes his academic colleagues as "dinosaurs", "deadbeats", "fossils", "has-beens", "mediocre", and "vapid". Steve Shapin in Harvard Magazine noted that Watson had written an unlikely "Book of Manners", telling about the skills needed at different times in a scientist's career; he wrote Watson was known for aggressively pursuing his own goals at the university. E. O. Wilson once described Watson as "the most unpleasant human being I had ever met", but in a later TV interview said that he considered them friends and their rivalry at Harvard "old history" (when they had competed for funding in their respective fields).

In the epilogue to the memoir Avoid Boring People, Watson alternately attacks and defends former Harvard University president Lawrence Summers, who stepped down in 2006 due in part to his remarks about women and science. Watson also states in the epilogue, "Anyone sincerely interested in understanding the imbalance in the representation of men and women in science must reasonably be prepared at least to consider the extent to which nature may figure, even with the clear evidence that nurture is strongly implicated."

=== Public remarks on genetics, intelligence, and race ===
==== Genetic determinism controversies ====
At a conference in 2000, Watson suggested a link between skin color and sex drive, hypothesizing that dark-skinned people have stronger libidos. His lecture argued that extracts of melanin—which gives skin its color—had been found to boost subjects' sex drive. "That's why you have Latin lovers", he said, according to people who attended the lecture. "You've never heard of an English lover. Only an English Patient." Watson also said that stereotypes associated with racial and ethnic groups have a genetic basis: Jews being intelligent, Chinese being intelligent but not creative because of selection for conformity, and Indians being servile because of selection under caste endogamy. Regarding intelligence differences between blacks and whites, Watson has asserted that "all our social policies are based on the fact that their (blacks) intelligence is the same as ours (whites) – whereas all the testing says not really ... people who have to deal with black employees find this not true."

Watson repeatedly asserted that differences in average measured IQ between blacks and whites are due to genetics. In early October 2007, he was interviewed by Charlotte Hunt-Grubbe at Cold Spring Harbor Laboratory (CSHL). Watson discussed his view that Africans are less intelligent than Westerners. Watson said his intention was to promote science, not racism, but some UK venues canceled his appearances, and Watson canceled the rest of his tour. An editorial in Nature said that his remarks were "beyond the pale" but expressed a wish that the tour had not been canceled so that Watson would have had to face his critics in person, encouraging scientific discussion on the matter. Because of the controversy, the board of trustees at Cold Spring Harbor Laboratory suspended Watson's administrative responsibilities. Watson issued an apology, then retired at age 79 from CSHL from what the lab called "nearly 40 years of distinguished service". Watson attributed his retirement to his age and to circumstances that he could never have anticipated or desired.

In 2008, Watson was appointed chancellor emeritus of CSHL, but continued to advise and guide project work at the laboratory. In a BBC documentary that year, Watson said that he did not see himself as a racist. In January 2019, following the broadcast of a television documentary made the previous year in which he repeated his views about race and genetics, CSHL revoked honorary titles that it had awarded to Watson and cut all remaining ties with him. Watson did not respond to the developments.

==== Criticism and legacy ====
Critics and elements of the general public have considered Watson's scientific positions to be racist, sexist and unacceptable. Writing for Time the day after Watson's death, Jeffery Kluger contrasted Watson's scientific legacy, giving rise to modern research and technology, with the legacy of his racist and sexist comments, and questions if the former can be lauded without endorsing the latter. Writing about Watson's relationship to eugenics that same day, legal historian Paul Lombardo said that his legacy is complex, having opposed state-sponsored programs of forced sterilization, only to be undermined by his own repeated allegations that racism was genetically justified.

== Personal life and death ==
Watson was an atheist. In 2003, he was one of 22 Nobel Laureates who signed the Humanist Manifesto. He wrote in Time that he contributed $1,000 to Bernie Sanders' 2016 presidential campaign.

Watson and Elizabeth Lewis married in 1968. They had two sons: Rufus Robert (b. 1970) and Duncan James (b. 1972). Watson sometimes talked about Rufus, who has schizophrenia, seeking to encourage progress in the understanding and treatment of mental illness by determining how genetics contributes to it.

On November 6, 2025, Watson died in East Northport, New York, a week after being transferred to hospice care following treatment for an infection. He was 97 years old. After his death, The New York Times called Watson one of the most important scientists of the 20th century while also acknowledging the controversy behind his racial views. The BBC noted that Watson's works "opened the door" to help explain how DNA replicates and carries genetic information while also "setting the stage for rapid advances in molecular biology".

== Awards and honors ==
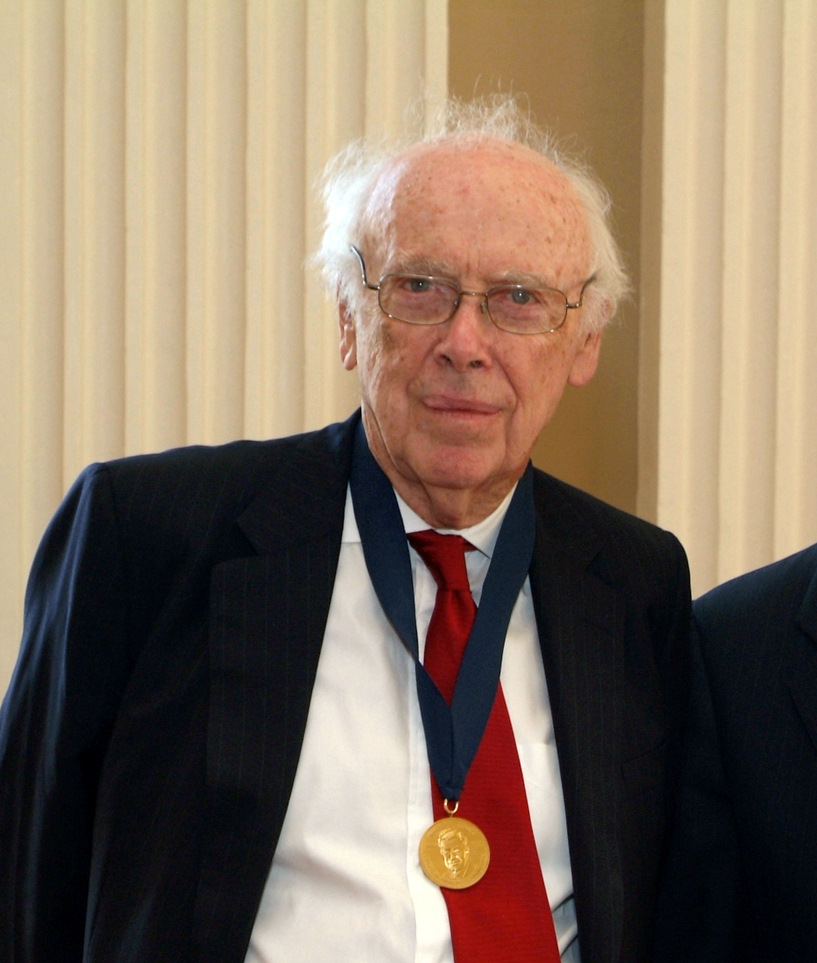
Watson with the Othmer Gold Medal in 2005

Watson won numerous awards including:

- 1959 - Eli Lilly Award in Biological Chemistry
- 1960 - Albert Lasker Award for Basic Medical Research
- 1962 - Nobel Prize in Physiology or Medicine
- 1977 - Presidential Medal of Freedom
- 1985 - EMBO Membership
- 1986 - Golden Plate Award of the American Academy of Achievement
- 1993 - Copley Medal of the Royal Society
- 1997 - National Medal of Science
- 2000 - Liberty Medal
- 2001 - Benjamin Franklin Medal for Distinguished Achievement in the Sciences
- 2002 - Gairdner Foundation International Award
- 2002 - Honorary Knight Commander of the Order of the British Empire (KBE)
- 2005 - Honorary Member of Royal Irish Academy
- 2005 - Othmer Gold Medal
- 2008 - CSHL Double Helix Medal Honoree
- 2010 - Honorary Fellow, the Hastings Center, an independent bioethics research institution
- 2011 - Irish America Hall of Fame, inducted March 2011
- 2011 - John J. Carty Award in molecular biology from the National Academy of Sciences

=== Honorary degrees received ===
- DSc, University of Chicago, US, 1961
- DSc, Indiana University, US, 1963
- LLD, University of Notre Dame, US, 1965
- DSc, Long Island University (CW Post), US, 1970
- DSc, Adelphi University, US, 1972
- DSc, Brandeis University, US, 1973
- DSc, Albert Einstein College of Medicine, US, 1974
- DSc, Hofstra University, US, 1976
- DSc, Harvard University, US, 1978
- DSc, Rockefeller University, US, 1980
- DSc, Clarkson College of Technology, US, 1981
- DSc, Rutgers University, US, 1988
- DSc, Bard College, US, 1991
- DSc, University of Stellenbosch, South Africa, 1993
- DSc, Fairfield University, US, 1993
- DSc, University of Cambridge, United Kingdom, 1993
- DrHC, Charles University in Prague, Czech Republic, 1998
- ScD, University of Dublin, Ireland, 2001

=== Professional and honorary affiliations ===
- American Academy of Arts and Sciences
- American Association for Cancer Research
- American Philosophical Society
- American Society of Biological Chemists
- Athenaeum Club, London, member
- Cambridge University, Honorary Fellow, Clare College, Cambridge
- Cold Spring Harbor Laboratory, Chancellor Emeritus; Honorary Trustee; Oliver R. Grace Professor Emeritus (all revoked in 2019)
- European Molecular Biology Organization, member since 1985
- National Academy of Sciences
- Oxford University, Newton-Abraham Visiting Professor
- Royal Danish Academy of Sciences and Letters
- Royal Society, Foreign Member of the Royal Society (ForMemRS) since 1981
- Russian Academy of Sciences

== See also ==
- Behavioral genetics – Study of genetic-environment interactions influencing behaviour
- History of molecular biology
- History of RNA biology
- Life Story – 1987 BBC docudrama about Watson and Crick's discovery of DNA structure
- List of RNA biologists
- Nobel disease – Embracing of scientifically unsound ideas by Nobel laureates
- Predictive medicine – Field of medicine concerning the prediction of future diseases of a patient
- Scientific racism – Pseudoscientific justification for racism
- Whole genome sequencing – Sequencing all the DNA of an individual at once

Awards and achievements
Preceded by Paul Berg	Recipient of the Eli Lilly Award in Biological Chemistry; 1960	Succeeded by Frederick Crane
Preceded by Georg von Békésy	Laureate of the Nobel Prize in Physiology or Medicine; 1962; With: Francis Crick and Maurice Wilkins	Succeeded by John Eccles, Alan Lloyd Hodgkin, and Andrew Huxley
Preceded by George Porter	Copley Medalist; 1993	Succeeded by Charles Frank
Preceded by Ruth Patrick	Laureate of the National Medal of Science in Biological Sciences; 1997; With: Robert Weinberg	Succeeded by Bruce Ames and Janet Rowley
