= David Schlessinger =

Canadian-born American researcher

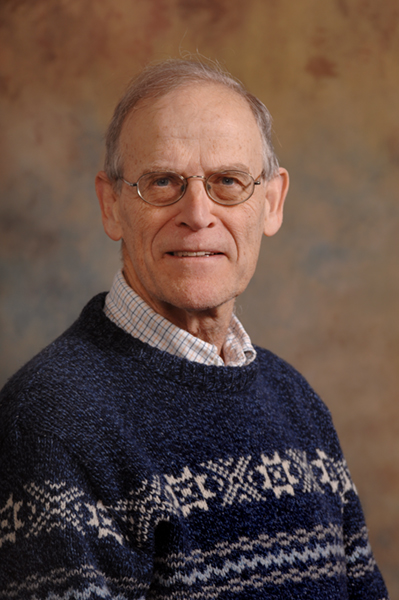
- Born: September 20, 1936 (age 89); Toronto, Canada
- Education: University of Chicago; Harvard University
- Known for: Mapping of the X Chromosome
- Scientific career
- Fields: Molecular biology, Genetics
- Workplaces: Washington University School of Medicine; National Institute on Aging
- Doctoral advisor: James Watson

David Schlessinger (born September 20, 1936, in Toronto, Canada) is a Canadian-born American biochemist, microbiologist, and geneticist. He is known for his directorship of the development of the map of the X chromosome.

== Biography ==
His family moved from Toronto to Chicago in 1939. David Schlessinger graduated from Theodore Roosevelt High School in 1953. At the age of 16 he matriculated at the University of Chicago. In 1955 he worked as a paid student-technician in Eugene Goldwasser's laboratory. Schlessinger graduated from the University of Chicago in 1957 with a B.S. in chemistry. At Harvard University he graduated in 1960 with a Ph.D. in biochemistry. According to Schlessinger, his most important achievement "as a graduate student was to develop the first in vitro system that could actually make some little bits of protein" — this system enabled Arthur Kornberg and other researchers to determine the molecular mechanisms of the genetic code. As a graduate student he spent some time at California Institute of Technology, where he worked on an experiment that failed. However, at Caltech he did meet a woman who was a plant physiologist and became his wife in 1960. Schlessinger's Ph.D. thesis "Ribosomes from Escherichia coli" was supervised by James Watson.

As a postdoc, Schlessinger worked at the Pasteur Institute, where he was supervised by Jacques Monod. In August 1962, Schlessinger with his wife and infant daughter, arrived in St. Louis, where he was to spend 35 years as a professor at Washington University School of Medicine. There he was the director of the Human Genome Center from 1987 to 1997. In 1995 he was the president of the American Society for Microbiology (ASM). After his many years in St. Louis as a professor of Molecular Microbiology, Genetics, and Microbiology in Medicine, Schlessinger moved to the National Institute on Aging (NIA) in September 1997. He has done research on microbial genomes, as well as the human genome. At NIA he headed the Laboratory of Genetics from 1997 to 2017. He was instrumental in starting the NIA's SardiNIA Project in 2001 and in retirement continued as an advisor to the project. The purpose of NIA's SardiNIA Project is the identification of "genetic bases for prominent age-associated changes".

In 1969 he received the Eli Lilly and Company-Elanco Research Award.

Schlessinger and his wife have two daughters and six grandchildren.

== Selected publications ==
- Tissieres, A.; Schlessinger, D.; Gros, Françoise (1960). "Amino Acid Incorporation into Proteins by Escherichia coli Ribosomes". Proceedings of the National Academy of Sciences. 46 (11): 1450–1463. Bibcode:1960PNAS...46.1450T. doi:10.1073/pnas.46.11.1450. PMC 223067. PMID 16590771.
- Luzzatto, L.; Apirion, D.; Schlessinger, D. (1968). "Mechanism of action of streptomycin in E. coli: Interruption of the ribosome cycle at the initiation of protein synthesis". Proceedings of the National Academy of Sciences. 60 (3): 873–880. Bibcode:1968PNAS...60..873L. doi:10.1073/pnas.60.3.873. PMC 225133. PMID 4875806.
- Little, R. D.; Pilia, G.; Johnson, S.; d'Urso, M.; Schlessinger, D. (1992). "Yeast artificial chromosomes spanning 8 megabases and 10-15 centimorgans of human cytogenetic band Xq26". Proceedings of the National Academy of Sciences. 89 (1): 177–181. Bibcode:1992PNAS...89..177L. doi:10.1073/pnas.89.1.177. PMC 48199. PMID 1729687.
- Ding, Jun; Sidore, Carlo; Butler, Thomas J.; Wing, Mary Kate; Qian, Yong; Meirelles, Osorio; Busonero, Fabio; Tsoi, Lam C.; Maschio, Andrea; Angius, Andrea; Kang, Hyun Min; Nagaraja, Ramaiah; Cucca, Francesco; Abecasis, Gonçalo R.; Schlessinger, David (2015-07-14). "Assessing Mitochondrial DNA Variation and Copy Number in Lymphocytes of ~2,000 Sardinians Using Tailored Sequencing Analysis Tools". PLoS Genetics. 11 (7) e1005306. doi:10.1371/journal.pgen.1005306.
