= Scott J. Hultgren =

American microbiologist

Scott J. Hultgren is an American microbiologist who is currently a professor of molecular microbiology and director of the Center for Women's Infectious Diseases Research at Washington University in St. Louis. Since 2011, he has been a member of the National Academy of Sciences, and was elected a member of the National Academy of Medicine in 2017 along with 80 other new members. In December 2019 he was named Fellow of the National Academy of Inventors. In April 2023, he was elected into the American Academy of Arts & Sciences. He is the principal investigator at the Hultgren Lab at Washington University School of Medicine. in 1998 he was awarded the Eli Lilly Award for his work in the fields of microbiology and immunology, noting his work in producing a vaccine for urinary tract infections.
