= Steven McKnight =

American biochemist and molecular biologist

- Education: University of Texas; University of Virginia
- Scientific career
- Workplaces: UT Southwestern; Howard Hughes Medical Institute

Steven Lanier McKnight is a professor and former chair of the department of biochemistry at UT Southwestern. His research is in the area of transcriptional regulation, drug discovery, and protein condensates.

McKnight received his bachelor's degree from University of Texas in 1974 and his PhD from University of Virginia in 1977. He was a Howard Hughes Medical Institute Investigator from 1988 to 1992.

== Early life ==
Steven (Steve) McKnight was born on August 27, 1949, and was raised in El Paso, Texas. His father Frank McKnight and his mother Sara Stevens McKnight had three children, Nancy, Elizabeth, and Steven. In high school, McKnight was an accomplished athlete but an indifferent student. He enrolled in college at UT Austin in the Fall of 1968, but he dropped out one year later. At his father's suggestion, McKnight enlisted in the Army, and in 1970 he was sent to Viet Nam, where he served as a member of a tank crew. Shortly after McKnight's arrival in Viet Nam, a land mine destroyed their tank in an explosion that McKnight and his fellow crew members barely survived. One of McKnight's more memorable experiences during that time was adopting a dog that became the crew's unofficial mascot.

== Education ==
McKnight credits his military service with instilling a sense of purpose and discipline. Upon McKnight's return to the United States, he re-entered college, initially with the goal of becoming a high school science teacher. During his time as an undergraduate, McKnight worked in the laboratory of developmental biologist Gary Freeman, who encouraged him to apply to graduate school. Following his graduation from the University of Texas in 1974, McKnight enrolled as a Ph.D. student at the University of Virginia, where he conducted research with Professor Oscar Miller, a pioneer in electron microscopy who had been the first scientist to visualize genes being transcribed into RNA. For his doctoral research, McKnight analyzed DNA replication and RNA synthesis in embryos of the fruit fly Drosophila melanogaster.

== Independent Research Career ==
After receiving his PhD in 1977, McKnight accepted a position as a Staff Associate at the Carnegie Institution of Washington's Department of Embryology in Baltimore, Maryland. In the 1970s and 1980s, the Department of Embryology was at the forefront of the new science of molecular genetics, and, in particular, its application to developmental biology.

At the Department of Embryology, McKnight pioneered the use of molecular biological methods, including linker-scanning mutagenesis, to define the regulatory DNA sequences that comprised the promoter of the herpes simplex virus (HSV) thymidine kinase gene, the first such analysis of a eukaryotic protein-coding gene.

McKnight's work on eukaryotic promoters led him to the purification and study of gene-specific transcription factors, with particular emphasis on the manner in which they recognize their target DNA sequences. McKnight purified and isolated cDNA coding for CCAAT/Enhancer Binding Protein (C/EBP), the founding member of a broad family of transcription factors, which includes those encoded by the Myc, Fos and Jun proto-oncogenes. Based on their studies of C/EBP, McKnight and his student William Landschulz, with independent contributions from Peter Kim and Erin O'Shea at MIT, defined the "basic leucine zipper" (bZIP) mode of DNA binding as a dimeric parallel coiled-coil in which amino acids in an adjacent basic region recognize a bipartite DNA target. This mode of association and DNA binding permits a large number of hetero- or homodimers starting from a much smaller number of bZIP proteins. This general strategy of combinatorial diversity has since been recognized in other families of transcription factors, such as the basic-helix-loop-helix (bHLH) family. The human genome codes for more than 40 bZIP proteins.

In the late 1990s, McKnight identified the transcription factor hypoxia inducible factor 2alpha (HIF2alpha, a member of the bHLH family) and the prolyl hydroxylase enzyme that oxygenates it under normoxic conditions, thereby leading to its degradation. This discovery, together with the growing appreciation that some cancers grow under hypoxic stress, led McKnight to screen for and identify small-molecule inhibitors of HIF2alpha and then to found Peloton Therapeutics, a biotechnology company focused on HIF2alpha inhibitors. Peloton Therapeutics was acquired by Merck in 2019, and its HIF2alpha inhibitor belzutifan was approved for therapy of renal cancer by the Food and Drug Administration (FDA) in 2023.

In the late 1980's, McKnight's group at Carnegie and the research group of Mark Ptashne at Harvard University independently conducted functional dissections of the HSV VP16 transcription factor (McKnight) and the yeast Gal4 transcription factor (Ptashne). Both groups discovered acidic regions capable of activating transcription in the apparent absence of conventional protein structure. The VP16 and Gal4 activation domains represented the first examples of unstructured protein domains of low sequence complexity having defined biological function. These related discoveries initiated McKnight's quest to understand the physical biochemistry of protein domains of low sequence complexity that are now recognized to comprise ~25% of eukaryotic proteomes and to function broadly in eukaryotic cells.

Independent studies performed by McKnight at UTSW and Dirk Gorlich at the Max Planck Institute for Multidisciplinary Studies in Gottingen, Germany laid the groundwork for the mechanistic dissection of the phenomenon of biological phase separation resulting from the self-association of protein domains of low sequence complexity. McKnight's subsequent work on biological phase separation by protein domains of low sequence complexity revealed formation of weakly adhered structures as described decades earlier by Linus Pauling (reviewed in Kato and McKnight, 2017). The weak cross-beta structures at the heart of protein phase separation are mediated by hydrogen bonding between polypeptide backbone N-H and carbonyl oxygen groups. Experimental evidence for these interactions was obtained by the use of synthetic peptides in which individual N-H groups were systematically methylated, a unique example of protein backbone "mutagenesis." Using intein chemistry (protein splicing) and native chemical ligation, McKnight's team stitched synthetic peptides into the native protein sequence to systematically evaluate the importance of individual peptide N-H groups and thereby define the precise boundaries of the sequence that mediates self-association of TAR DNA-binding protein (TDP)-43. Subtle mutations within the low complexity domain of TDP-43 enhance its self-association in a subset of patients with amyotrophic lateral sclerosis (ALS) and frontotemporal dementia (FTD), thereby leading to the formation of protein aggregates in neurons of affected individuals.

== Support for Creative Science and Creative Scientists ==
In 1995, after three years as director of research at Tularik, Inc., a South San Francisco-based biotechnology company, McKnight moved to UTSW, serving as chair of the Department of Biochemistry from 1996 to 2016. Beyond UTSW, McKnight's service to the scientific community has included serving on the Scientific Advisory Board of the Howard Hughes Medical Institute and the Institute of Molecular Pathology (Vienna, Austria), on the Board of Trustees of the Carnegie Institution of Washington, and as President of the American Society of Biochemistry and Molecular Biology. At UTSW, McKnight created a set of prizes in honor of his parents, the Sara and Frank McKnight Undergraduate Prizes in Molecular Sciences. These prizes recognize college students from across the United States who have conducted outstanding research in chemistry, biological chemistry, biophysics, or quantitative biology. McKnight also established the Sara and Frank McKnight Fellowships, an endowed fund that supports research conducted by young scientists within the Department of Biochemistry at UTSW.

In essays and lectures, McKnight has extolled the importance of creative and curiosity-driven scientific research and of pursuing scientific directions that are off the beaten path. In a 2009 commentary, "Unconventional Wisdom" McKnight offered advice and encouragement for young scientists, as well as for older scientists who are young at heart.

== Criticism ==
As president of the American Society for Biochemistry and Molecular Biology, McKnight published messages in the society's newsletter in 2014 critical of young scientists, calling them "riff-raff" and saying that "The average scientist today is not of the quality of our predecessors". He complained that biomedical research had, in recent years, attracted researchers who "never would have survived as scientists in the 1960s and 1970s", and claimed that the funding crisis can be attributed to the NIH review committees being "undoubtedly contaminated by riff-raff". The month prior, he had derided young scientists for being uninformed on the historic methods of biochemistry. These opinions attracted media attention and criticism from many in the scientific community. Future of Research, an advocacy group led by Jessica Polka that supports junior researchers, satirized McKnight's comments by selling "Riff-raff" T-shirts, using the proceeds to fund the 2015 Future of Research conference.

== Awards ==
- 1989 Eli Lilly and Company-Elanco Research Award
- 1991 Award in Molecular Biology of National Academy of Sciences
- 1992 Member of the National Academy of Sciences
- 1992 Member of the American Academy of Arts and Sciences
- 2004 National Institutes of Health Director's Pioneer Award
- 2007 Fellow of the American Association for the Advancement of Science
- 2014 Wiley Prize
- 2020 Welch Award
- 2025 Albert Lasker Award for Basic Medical Research
