= John G. Kidd =

American pathologist

John Graydon Kidd (July 20, 1908, Edgewood, Texas – January 28, 1991, Nacogdoches, Texas) was an American physician, pathologist, and virologist.

== Biography ==
Kidd graduated in 1928 with an A.B. from Duke University and in 1932 with an M.D. from Johns Hopkins University School of Medicine. From 1932 to 1934 he was a medical intern and assistant resident physician at Detroit's Henry Ford Hospital. In 1934 he became an assistant in pathology and bacteriology at Manhattan's Rockefeller Institute for Medical Research. There he was promoted to associate in 1938 and to associate member in 1942. In 1944 he resigned from the Rockefeller Institute and became the pathologist-in-chief and chair of the pathology department at the New York Hospital-Cornell Medical Center (now called the Weill Cornell Medical Center). He retired from the hospital in 1964 but continued his research and teaching at Cornell University before retiring as professor emeritus of pathology in 1975. In his last years he lived with his wife in Center, Texas.

He did research on oncoviruses and the serology of tumors and experimental pathology of cancer. He discovered that a constituent in the blood of guinea pigs could cure laboratory mice in some cases of experimentally-induced tumors. His discovery led to the identification and use of the enzyme asparaginase in chemotherapy against some forms of cancer, specifically, acute lymphoblastic leukemia (ALL) and lymphoblastic lymphoma (LBL). He frequently collaborated with Peyton Rous.

Kidd received in 1939 the Eli Lilly and Company-Elanco Research Award. He was elected in 1946 a fellow of the American Association for the Advancement of Science. In 1973, he was the recipient of the prestigious ASIP gold-headed cane award. In 1930 he married Maudine Adams (1910–1997). Upon his death, he was survived by his widow, two sons, two daughters, five grandchildren, and one great-grandchild.

== Selected publications ==
- Rous, Peyton; Kidd, John G. (1936). "The Carcinogenic Effect of a Virus Upon Tarred Skin". Science. 83 (2159): 468–469. Bibcode:1936Sci....83..468R. doi:10.1126/science.83.2159.468. PMID 17796848.
- Rous, Peyton; Kidd, John G. (1938). "The Carcinogenic Effect of a Papilloma Virus on the Tarred Skin of Rabbits". Journal of Experimental Medicine. 67 (3): 399–428. doi:10.1084/jem.67.3.399. PMC 2180321. PMID 19870729.
- Rous, Peyton; Kidd, John G. (1939). "A Comparison of Virus-Induced Rabbit Tumors with the Tumors of Unknown Cause Elicited by Tarring". Journal of Experimental Medicine. 69 (3): 399–424. doi:10.1084/jem.69.3.399. PMC 2133741. PMID 19870854.
- Kidd, John G.; Rous, Peyton (1940). "A Transplantable Rabbit Carcinoma Originating in a Virus-Induced Papilloma and Containing the Virus in Masked or Altered Form". Journal of Experimental Medicine. 71 (6): 813–838. doi:10.1084/jem.71.6.813. PMC 2135106. PMID 19871000.
- Rous, Peyton; Kidd, John G. (1941). "Conditional Neoplasms and Subthreshold Neoplastic States". Journal of Experimental Medicine. 73 (3): 365–390. doi:10.1084/jem.73.3.365. PMC 2135131. PMID 19871084.
- Rous, Peyton; Kidd, John G.; Smith, William E. (1952). "Experiments on the Cause of the Rabbit Carcinomas Derived from Virus-Induced Papillomas". Journal of Experimental Medicine. 96 (2): 159–174. doi:10.1084/jem.96.2.159. PMC 2136136. PMID 14955572.
- Kalfayan, Bernard; Kidd, John G. (1953). "Structural Changes Produced in Brown-Pearce Carcinoma Cells by Means of a Specific Antibody and Complement". Journal of Experimental Medicine. 97 (1): 145–162. doi:10.1084/jem.97.1.145. PMC 2136188. PMID 13022870.
- Kidd, John G. (1953). "Regression of Transplanted Lymphomas Induced in Vivo by Means of Normal Guinea Pig Serum". Journal of Experimental Medicine. 98 (6): 565–582. doi:10.1084/jem.98.6.565. PMC 2136344. PMID 13109110.
