= Alan W. Bernheimer =

American microbiologist

Alan Weyl Bernheimer Sr. (December 9, 1913, Philadelphia – January 3, 2006, New York City) was an American microbiologist, known as a pioneer of modern bacterial toxinology.

== Biography ==
Bernheimer graduated with a B.S. in 1935 and an A.M. in 1937 from Temple University, where he worked as an assistant in biology from 1935 to 1937. In 1942, he received his Ph.D. in medical sciences from the University of Pennsylvania. His Ph.D. thesis is entitled Studies on the antigenic specificity of Paramecium and studies on the massive cultivation of Streptococcus pyogenes. From 1937 to 1938 he was an instructor in bacteriology at Pennsylvania State College of Optometry (now called Salus University). In the department of microbiology of (what is now called) the New York University Grossman School of Medicine, he was an instructor from 1941 to 1945, an assistant professor from 1945 to 1952, an associate professor from 1952 to 1958, and a full professor from 1958 to 1984, when he retired as professor emeritus. At the NYU medical school, he was the chair of Basic Medical Sciences from 1969 to 1974. From 1957 to 1960, Bernheimer served as a consultant to the Office of the Surgeon General of the United States. From 1963 to 1968, he was a trustee of the Cold Spring Harbor Laboratory. He was often a summer investigator at Cold Spring Harbor as well as at the Marine Biological Laboratory in Woods Hole, Massachusetts.

During WW II, Bernheimer contributed to the development of a vaccine against gas gangrene. Throughout his career, he was dedicated to laboratory work. He and his co-workers compared toxins produced by a wide variety of organisms. He did research on venoms from insects, spiders, snakes, sea jellies, and sea anemones, and demonstrated how such venoms sometimes share biochemical and serological properties with bacterial toxins. In 1985 Bernheimer and two colleagues published their discovery that cytotoxic phospholipases D are present in the venom of the brown recluse spider (Loxosceles reclusa) and in cultures of Corynebacterium pseudotuberculosis. The two enzymatic toxins have different evolutionary origins but are similar in molecular weight, charge, substrate specificity, and in several biological activities. In studies of cholesterol oxidase, a bacterial cytotoxin derived from Rhodococcus equi, Bernheimer and his colleagues showed that a cytotoxin was rendered lethal to rabbits made hypercholesterolemic by diet. Bernheimer was the author or co-author of more than 150 scientific papers and the editor of several books.

Bernheimer received in 1948 the Eli Lilly and Company-Elanco Research Award. He was elected in 1951 a fellow of the American Association for the Advancement of Science. In April 1976 he gave the inaugural Stuart Mudd Lecture of the Eastern Pennsylvania Branch of the American Society for Microbiology.

Bernheimer developed a form of camera-less photography that he called Reflectographs.

In March 1942 he married Harriet Poller (1919–2009), who became a professor of medicine at SUNY Downstate Medical Center. They had a son, Alan Weyl Bernheimer Jr., known as the poet Alan Bernheimer.

== Selected publications ==
=== Articles ===
- Bernheimer, Alan W.; Rodbart, Marcelle (1948). "The Effect of Nucleic Acids and of Carbohydrates on the Formation of Streptolysin". Journal of Experimental Medicine. 88 (2): 149–168. doi:10.1084/jem.88.2.149. PMC 2135816. PMID 18873865.
- —— (1949). "Formation of a Bacterial Toxin (Streptolysin S) by Resting Cells". Journal of Experimental Medicine. 90 (5): 373–392. doi:10.1084/jem.90.5.373. PMC 2135919. PMID 18143584.
- —— (1952). "Hemagglutinins in Caterpillar Bloods". Science. 115 (2980): 150–151. Bibcode:1952Sci...115..150B. doi:10.1126/science.115.2980.150. PMID 14913200.
- ——; Schwartz, L. L. (1963). "Isolation and Composition of Staphylococcal Alpha Toxin". Journal of General Microbiology. 30 (3): 455–468. doi:10.1099/00221287-30-3-455. PMID 13967637.
- ——; Schwartz, Lois L. (1964). "Lysosomal Disruption by Bacterial Toxins". Journal of Bacteriology. 87 (5): 1100–1104. doi:10.1128/jb.87.5.1100-1104.1964. PMC 277152. PMID 5874534.
- Weismann, G.; Becher, B.; Wiedermann, G.; —— (1965). "Studies on Lysosomes. Vii. Acute and Chronic Arthritis Produced by Intra-Articular Injections of Streptolysin S in Rabbits". The American Journal of Pathology. 46 (1): 129–147. PMC 1920330. PMID 14253126.
- ——; Avigad, L. S. (1970). "Nature and Properties of a Cytolytic Agent Produced by Bacillus subtilis". Journal of General Microbiology. 61 (3): 361–369. doi:10.1099/00221287-61-3-361. PMID 4992273.
- ——; Avigad, Lois S. (1974). "Partial Characterization of Aerolysin, a Lytic Exotoxin from Aeromonas hydrophila". Infection and Immunity. 9 (6): 1016–1021. doi:10.1128/iai.9.6.1016-1021.1974. PMC 414926. PMID 4208526.
- —— (1974). "Interactions between membranes and cytolytic bacterial toxins". Biochimica et Biophysica Acta (BBA) - Reviews on Biomembranes. 344: 27–50. doi:10.1016/0304-4157(74)90007-0.
- ——; Avigad, L. S. (1976). "Properties of a toxin from the sea anemone Stoichacis helianthus, including specific binding to sphingomyelin". Proceedings of the National Academy of Sciences. 73 (2): 467–471. Bibcode:1976PNAS...73..467B. doi:10.1073/pnas.73.2.467. PMC 335930. PMID 1757.
- ——; Rudy, Bernardo (1986). "Interactions between membranes and cytolytic peptides". Biochimica et Biophysica Acta (BBA) - Reviews on Biomembranes. 864 (1): 123–141. doi:10.1016/0304-4157(86)90018-3. PMID 2424507.
- —— (1988). "[30] Assay of hemolytic toxins". Microbial Toxins: Tools in Enzymology. Methods in Enzymology. Vol. 165. pp. 213–217. doi:10.1016/S0076-6879(88)65033-6. ISBN 9780121820664. PMID 2906728.

=== Books ===
- Bernheimer, Alan W., ed. (1976). Mechanisms in bacterial toxinology. Developments in medical microbiology and infectious diseases. New York: Wiley. ISBN 0471071056. LCCN 76008274.
- Bernheimer, Alan W., ed. (1977). Perspectives in toxinology. Developments in medical microbiology and infectious diseases. New York: Wiley. ISBN 0471018554. LCCN 77008849.
