= Linda Randall =

American biochemist

Linda Randall is a Professor Emerita of Biochemistry and Wurdack Chair Emerita of Biological Chemistry at the University of Missouri. Her research has shown unexpected and complex details of the movement of newly made proteins from the cytosol across membranes into the organelles of the cell. In particular, she found that the entire protein was kept unfolded by association with a chaperone and not just directed to cross membranes by its terminal leader sequence. In 1997, she was elected to the National Academy of Sciences of the USA because of the excellence of this work. She has received a number of other honors and awards.

== Education ==
Randall received her BS from Colorado State University in Zoology and her PhD at the University of Wisconsin in Molecular Biology.

== Academic research career ==
Randall was a professor at the University of Uppsala for eight years before joining the faculty at Washington State University, WSU, in 1981. After twenty years at WSU, she moved to the University of Missouri.

Randall's research focuses on the mechanism of protein export in the bacterium Escherichia coli. Her laboratory demonstrated the role of chaperones in the transport and folding of proteins.

== Honors and awards ==
- National Academy of Sciences, 1997
- American Academy of Microbiology
- American Academy of Arts and Sciences, 1984
- Fellow of the American Association for the Advancement of Science
- Eli Lilly Award in Microbiology or Immunology (American Society for Microbiology)

== Selected works ==
- Bariya, Priya; Randall, Linda L. (2019). "Coassembly of SecYEG and SecA Fully Restores the Properties of the Native Translocon". Journal of Bacteriology. 201 (1). doi:10.1128/JB.00493-18. PMC 6287467. PMID 30275279.
- Findik, Bahar T.; Smith, Virginia F.; Randall, Linda L. (2018). "Penetration into membrane of amino-terminal region of SecA when associated with SecYEG in active complexes". Protein Science. 27 (3): 681–691. doi:10.1002/pro.3362. PMC 5818754. PMID 29247569.
- Suo, Yuying; Hardy, Simon J.S.; Randall, Linda L. (2015). "The Basis of Asymmetry in the SecA:SecB Complex". Journal of Molecular Biology. 427 (4): 887–900. doi:10.1016/j.jmb.2014.12.008. PMC 4370339. PMID 25534082.
- Mao, Chunfeng; Cheadle, Carl E.; Hardy, Simon J. S.; Lilly, Angela A.; Suo, Yuying; Sanganna Gari, Raghavendar Reddy; King, Gavin M.; Randall, Linda L. (2013). "Stoichiometry of SecYEG in the active translocase of Escherichia coli varies with precursor species". Proceedings of the National Academy of Sciences. 110 (29): 11815–11820. Bibcode:2013PNAS..11011815M. doi:10.1073/pnas.1303289110. PMC 3718118. PMID 23818593.
- Sanganna Gari, Raghavendar Reddy; Frey, Nathan C.; Mao, Chunfeng; Randall, Linda L.; King, Gavin M. (2013). "Dynamic Structure of the Translocon SecYEG in Membrane". Journal of Biological Chemistry. 288 (23): 16848–16854. doi:10.1074/jbc.M113.471870. PMC 3675617. PMID 23609442.
- Suo, Yuying; Hardy, Simon J. S.; Randall, Linda L. (2011). "Orientation of SecA and SecB in Complex, Derived from Disulfide Cross-Linking". Journal of Bacteriology. 193 (1): 190–196. doi:10.1128/JB.00975-10. PMC 3019939. PMID 21037004.
- Randall, Linda L.; Henzl, Michael T. (2010). "Direct identification of the site of binding on the chaperone SecB for the amino terminus of the translocon motor SecA". Protein Science. 19 (6): 1173–1179. doi:10.1002/pro.392. PMC 2895241. PMID 20512970.
- Crane, Jennine M.; Lilly, Angela A.; Randall, Linda L. (2010). "Characterization of Interactions Between Proteins Using Site-Directed Spin Labeling and Electron Paramagnetic Resonance Spectroscopy". Protein Secretion. Methods in Molecular Biology. Vol. 619. pp. 173–190. doi:10.1007/978-1-60327-412-8_11. ISBN 978-1-60327-167-7. PMC 5814136. PMID 20419411.
- Lilly, Angela A.; Crane, Jennine M.; Randall, Linda L. (2009). "Export chaperone SecB uses one surface of interaction for diverse unfolded polypeptide ligands". Protein Science. 18 (9): 1860–1868. doi:10.1002/pro.197. PMC 2777361. PMID 19569227.
- Randall, L.; Hardy, S. J. (1995). "High selectivity with low specificity: How SecB has solved the paradox of chaperone binding". Trends in Biochemical Sciences. 20 (2): 65–69. doi:10.1016/S0968-0004(00)88959-8. PMID 7701564.
