= Wayne W. Umbreit =

American bacteriologist (1913–2007)

Wayne William Umbreit (May 1, 1913, Markesan, Wisconsin – August 4, 2007, Holland, Pennsylvania) was an American bacteriologist.

== Biography ==
At the University of Wisconsin–Madison (UWM), Umbreit graduated with a B.Sc. in 1934 and an M.Sc. in 1936. At UWM he worked as an assistant in bacteriology and biochemistry and a research associate from 1936 to 1937. At Rutgers University he was an instructor in soil microbiology from 1937 to 1938. In 1938 he returned to UWM, graduating with a Ph.D. in 1939. His Ph.D. thesis Studies on the mechanism of symbiotic nitrogen fixation was supervised by Perry William Wilson. At UWM Umbreit taught bacteriology and biochemistry, as an instructor from 1938 to 1941 and as an assistant professor from 1941 to 1944. In the department of bacteriology of Cornell University, he was an associate professor from 1944 to 1946 and a full professor from 1946 to 1947, when he resigned. From 1947 to 1958, Umbreit was the head of the department of enzyme chemistry of the Merck Institute for Therapeutic Research in Rahway, New Jersey. At Rutgers University he was a professor of microbiology from 1958 to 1983, when he retired as professor emeritus. He did research on the biochemistry of several topics: nitrogen fixation, vitamins, antibiotics, and autotrophic bacteria.

Umbreit received in 1947 the Eli Lilly and Company-Elanco Research Award. He was elected in 1951 a fellow of the American Association for the Advancement of Science. In 1952 he was awarded the Biochemical Congress Symposium Medal of the 2nd International Biochemical Congress, which was held in Paris in July 1952.

In 1937 he married Doris McQuade (1914–2001). They had a daughter and two sons.

== Selected publications ==
=== Articles ===
- Waksman, Selman A.; Umbreit, W. W.; Cordon, Theone C. (1939). "Thermophilic actinomycetes and fungi in soils and in composts". Soil Science. 47 (1): 37–62. Bibcode:1939SoilS..47...37W. doi:10.1097/00010694-193901000-00005. S2CID 93053145.
- Lichstein, H. C.; Gunsalus, I. C.; Umbreit, W. W. (1945). "Function of the vitamin B6 group: pyridoxal phosphate (codecarboxylase) in transamination" (PDF). Journal of Biological Chemistry. 161 (1): 311–320. doi:10.1016/S0021-9258(17)41545-6. Archived from the original on 2019-05-05.
- Albaum, Harry G.; Umbreit, W. W. (1947). "Differentiation between ribose-3-phosphate and ribose-5-phosphate by means of the orcinol–pentose reaction" (PDF). Journal of Biological Chemistry. 167 (2): 369–376. doi:10.1016/S0021-9258(17)30990-0. PMID 20285032. Archived from the original on 2017-12-14.
- Keller, Doris L.; Umbreit, Wayne W. (1956). ""Permanent" Alteration of Behavior in Mice by Chemical and Psychological Means". Science. 124 (3225): 723–724. Bibcode:1956Sci...124..723K. doi:10.1126/science.124.3225.723. PMID 13371313.
- Koditschek, L. K.; Umbreit, W. W. (1969). "Α-Glycerophosphate Oxidase in Streptococcus faecium F 24". Journal of Bacteriology. 98 (3): 1063–1068. doi:10.1128/jb.98.3.1063-1068.1969. PMC 315296. PMID 5788698.
- Beebe, James L.; Umbreit, W. W. (1971). "Extracellular Lipid of Thiobacillus thiooxidans". Journal of Bacteriology. 108 (1): 612–614. doi:10.1128/jb.108.1.612-614.1971. PMC 247112. PMID 4330743.

=== Books ===
- Umbreit, W. W.; Burris, Robert Harza; Stauffer, John Frederick (1945). Manometric techniques and related methods for the study of tissue metabolism. Minneapolis: Burgess Publishing Company. OCLC 02387442; chapters on specialized techniques by P.P. Cohen, G.A. Le Page and V.R. Potter, and contributions by J.W. Bain [and others] (The book's title was changed several times for subsequent editions.)
  - Manometric techniques and tissue metabolism (2nd ed.). 1951.
  - Manometric techniques: A manual describing methods applicable to the study of tissue metabolism (3rd ed.). 1957. ASIN B0007E97TE.; 4th edition. 1964.
  - Umbreit, W. W.; Burris, Robert Harza; Stauffer, John Frederick (1972). Manometric and biochemical techniques: A manual describing methods applicable to the study of tissue metabolism (5th ed.). ISBN 0024221201.
- Umbreit, W. W. (1952). Metabolic maps, Volume 1. Minneapolis: Burgess Publishing Company. OCLC 01111115.
  - Umbreit, W. W. (1960). Metabolic maps, Volume 2. Minneapolis: Burgess Publishing Company. OCLC 06011961.
- Oginsky, Evelyn L.; Umbreit, W. W. (1954). An introduction to bacterial physiology. San Francisco: W. H. Freeman.
  - Umbreit, Wayne William (1976). Essentials of bacteriology (2nd edition of An introduction to bacterial physiology). Dowden, Hutchinson & Ross. ISBN 0-8087-2107-0.
- Umbreit, W. W. (1962). Modern microbiology. San Francisco: W. H. Freeman. OCLC 00406025.
