= Vanessa Sperandio =

Molecular Microbiology researcher

- Born: December 30, 1970 (age 55)
- Education: State University of Campinas; University of São Paulo; University of Maryland School of Medicine
- Scientific career
- Fields: Bacterial pathogenesis, host-microbial interactions
- Workplaces: University of Texas Southwestern Medical Center

Vanessa Sperandio is a professor and chair of the Department of Medical Microbiology and Immunology at the University of Wisconsin-Madison, she was a professor at the UT Southwestern Medical Center in both the departments of microbiology and biochemistry. She will join the University of Wisconsin School of Medicine and Public Health as the chair of the Department of Medical Microbiology and Immunology in spring 2022.

== Research ==
Sperandio's research focuses on the signaling mechanisms between mammalian hosts, their beneficial microbiota, and bacterial pathogens.

== Awards ==
Sperandio was a 1997 fellow of the Pew Charitable Trust and was elected to the American Academy of Microbiology in 2013. She is also a Kavli Frontiers of Science Fellow by the National Academy of Sciences and selected as a Burroughs Wellcome Fund Investigator in the Pathogenesis of Infectious Diseases. She was elected a member of AAAS in 2022, and is the chair of the governors of the American Academy of Microbiology.
