= Wang Chang-yi =

Taiwanese biochemist and immunologist (born 1951)

- 王長怡
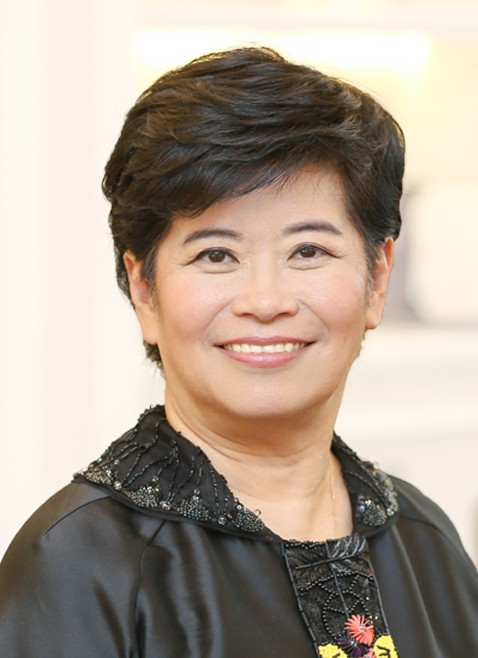
- Born: December 19, 1951 (age 74); Taipei, Taiwan
- Education: National Taiwan University (BS); Rockefeller University (PhD)
- Known for: Synthetic peptide based immunological applications in diagnostics, vaccines and immunotherapeutics.; Protein drugs including innovative monoclonal antibodies and long acting protein drugs.
- Scientific career
- Fields: Biochemistry; Immunology
- Institutions: Memorial Sloan Kettering Cancer Center
- Thesis: Structural and Functional Characterication of Surface Antigens on Human B Lymphocytes (1979)
- Doctoral advisor: Henry Kunkel
- Other academic advisors: Robert Bruce Merrifield; Ralph M. Steinman

Chinese name
- Traditional Chinese: 王長怡
- Simplified Chinese: 王长怡
Transcriptions
Standard Mandarin
- Hanyu Pinyin: Wángzhǎngyí
- IPA: [tʃɒ̌ŋ jí wɒ́ŋ]

Wang Chang-yi (Chinese: 王長怡; pinyin: Wáng Zhǎngyí; born December 19, 1951) is a Taiwanese biochemist and immunologist. She is the founder of United Biomedical, Inc. (UBI), headquartered in Hauppauge, New York, and its group of companies in Asia.

== Early life and education ==
Wang was born in Taiwan in 1951. Her father was a member of the National Assembly. She was inspired by physicist Chien-Shiung Wu, who disproved the ‘conservation of parity’ theory in 1957, to go into science. She graduated with honors from National Taiwan University with a bachelor's degree in organic chemistry in 1973.

After graduating from National Taiwan University, Chang completed graduate studies in the United States at Rockefeller University, where she was the first Asian woman in its graduate program. She earned her Ph.D. in 1979 with a dual specialization in biochemistry and immunology. As a graduate student, she was mentored by Bruce Merrifield, Henry Kunkel, Gerald Edelman and Ralph Steinman. She then joined the Memorial Sloan Kettering Cancer Center as the youngest faculty member, principal investigator, and head of the molecular immunology laboratory.

== Career ==
In 1985, Wang and her husband Nean Hu founded United Biomedical, Inc. in New York, a company focusing on medicine and vaccine development. She founded United Biomedical, Inc. Asia in Taiwan in 1998. She later founded United Biopharma and UBI Pharma in 2013 and 2014 respectively. The companies later created testing for HIV and Hepatitis C, and carried out research on a vaccine for HIV.

Wang is the author of more than 120 peer-reviewed scientific publications and by 2019, she was the inventor of more than 80 patents.

=== Awards ===
In 2007, the New York Intellectual Property Law Association (NYIPLA) presented Wang with the Inventor of the Year Award.

In 2009, the Bill and Melinda Gates Foundation awarded Grand Challenges Exploration Grants to Wang for the Synthetic Peptides to Inhibit HIV Entry program.

In 2018, the Brain Mapping Foundation presented Wang with the Pioneer in Technology Award.

=== Litigation ===
In 2021, Wang was part of a court case which concerned the ownership of UBI, in particular, possible breach of contractual agreements and misuse of authority positions.

== Family ==
Wang’s daughter, Mei Mei Hu, is the co-founder and CEO of Vaxxinity (originally named Covaxx), a subsidiary of UBI. Vaxxinityoriginally focused on possible vaccines for Alzheimer’s and animal health, but shifted to working on a vaccine for COVID-19. The company helped to develop vaccine candidate UB-612.

== Professional and honorary affiliations ==
- National Institutes of Health, United States
- National Taiwan University (Adjunct Professor)
- National Tsing Hua University (Adjunct Professor)
