= K. Gordon Lark =

American biologist and professor (1930–2020)

Karl Gordon Lark (December 13, 1930, Lafayette, Indiana – April 10, 2020) was an American biologist and a Distinguished Professor Emeritus at the University of Utah, known for his research on canine genetics.

He graduated in 1948 with a bachelor's degree from the University of Chicago and in 1952 with a Ph.D. from New York University. After three years as a postdoc, he was from 1956 to 1963 a faculty member in Medical Microbiology at St. Louis University Medical School. From 1963 to 1970 he worked at Kansas State University. From 1970 to 1977 he was the chair of the Department of Biology at the University of Utah. In 1965 the American Society for Microbiology awarded him the Eli Lilly and Company-Elanco Research Award.

The dog genetics community owes a special thanks to Gordon for his seminal contributions. His PNAS paper in 2002 with Kevin Chase revolutionized the field, demonstrating for the first time that seemingly complex morphologic traits were controlled by a small number of genes, thus nominating the dog as a genetic system for the identification of genes controlling breed-specific differences in morphology and behavior. That paper also provided a key impetus to select the dog as a mammal for early whole genome sequencing in 2005, which in turn allowed canine genetics to blossom as a system of interest to medical geneticists, anthropologists, behavioral scientists and physiologists.
