= Carl Gordon (journalist) =

Scottish journalist

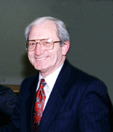
- Born: 13 March 1931; Greenock, Scotland
- Died: 2002 (aged 70–71)
- Occupation(s): Journalist and columnist

Carl Gordon (13 March 1931 – 2002) was a Scottish journalist best known for his reporting on the Lower Clyde region and his later work with The Herald.

== Early life and education ==
Gordon was born in Greenock and attended Mearns Street School and Greenock High School. His maternal grandfather was from Copenhagen, which encouraged his early interest in Scandinavian languages. By the time he left school at age 14, he had begun teaching himself Danish. His first employment was as a railway clerk in the Greenock area.

== Military service ==
In 1949 he was called up for National Service. After training with the Royal Army Service Corps (later the Royal Logistic Corps), he was posted to the War Office (now the Ministry of Defence). He left the Army in 1951 with the rank of sergeant.

== Journalism career ==
Gordon had aspired to become a journalist from an early age. Shortly after leaving the Army, he joined The Greenock Telegraph, where he eventually became the paper's first deputy news editor.

In 1967 he accepted a position as Greenock-based reporter for the Glasgow Herald and the Evening Times. His reporting beat included the Lower Clyde, covering areas such as Dunoon and Rothesay. During this period, the region experienced a high level of maritime activity, including ship launches, liner calls and busy docks, alongside coverage of local councils, the US base at the Holy Loch and the emerging oil industry.

As shipyards and heavy industry in the region declined in the 1970s, the need for a dedicated Lower Clyde correspondent diminished. Gordon transferred to Glasgow in 1979.

== Major stories ==
From Glasgow, Gordon covered several notable cases, including the sinking of the Kintyre fishing vessel Antares, in which four crew members died after the boat's nets were caught by the Royal Navy submarine HMS Trenchant . He also reported on the subsequent fatal accident inquiry.

In 1992 he covered the Arthur Thompson murder trial, which ran for 54 days at the High Court in Glasgow. At the time, it was one of the longest trials in Scottish criminal history. After the trial concluded, Lord McCluskey, the presiding judge, sent Gordon a note acknowledging his reporting. During the proceedings, Paul Ferris, who was acquitted, wrote to The Herald commenting on the newspaper's coverage.

== Later life ==
Gordon retired in 1994. He made frequent visits to Scandinavia, especially Denmark, where he had relatives and close friends, and he wrote travel pieces for The Herald focusing on locations less familiar to Scottish readers. He was a member of the Scandinavia Philatelic Society and the Greenock Philatelic Society.

In 1965 he married Arline June Bloomfield, who died in 1984 at the age of 37. They had one son and one daughter.
