= Neogen =

International food safety company

Neogen Corporation
- Type: Public
- Traded as: Nasdaq: NEOG; S&P 600 component
- Industry: Food safety; Animal safety; Genomics
- Founded: 1982; 44 years ago in Lansing, Michigan
- Founders: Herbert Dow Doan; James L. Herbert
- Headquarters: Lansing, Michigan, U.S.
- Area served: Worldwide
- Key people: James C. Borel (chairman); Mike Nassif (CEO and president); Bryan Riggsbee (CFO); Jeremy Yarwood (CTO)
- Revenue: ▲US$895.1 million (2025)
- Operating income: ▼US$58.62 million (2022)
- Net income: ▼US$−612.2 billion (2025)
- Total assets: ▲US$992.93 million (2022)
- Total equity: ▼US$2,017.3 million (2025)
- Number of employees: 2,108 (2022)
- Divisions: Neogen Animal Safety; Neogen Food Safety
- Subsidiaries: Abtek (Biologicals) Limited; Chem-Tech, Ltd.; Delf Chem Solutions, Ltd.; GeneSeek, Inc.; Genetic Veterinary Services, LLC; Hacco, Inc.; Lab M Limited; Megazyme, Ltd.; Quat-Chem, Ltd.; Rogama Industria Comercio Ltda.
- Website: neogen.com

Neogen Corporation is an international food safety company that provides test kits and relevant products to detect dangerous substances in food. The company was founded in 1982 and is based in Lansing, Michigan. The company serves a wide range of countries including Canada, United States, the United Kingdom, parts of Europe, Mexico and Brazil, India, and China, among others. The company operates a product line of over 100 drug detection test kits worldwide for the detection of about 300 abused and therapeutic drugs in animal treatment. In 2009, it became a vendor of the Chinese government and has been engaged in researching China-specific food safety and plant health issues.

== History ==
The company was founded by Herbert D. "Ted" Doan and James L. Herbert in 1981 as an investment project by Michigan State University. An early $50,000 investment by the Michigan State University Foundation awarded 30% of the company shares in the early years after its founding. The purpose of the company was to help strengthen the biotechnology community in Lansing and the state as a whole, which had no large biotech companies at the time, and to help retain molecular biologists within the state. One of the earliest acquisitions for the company was Ideal Instruments Inc. in 1985 in order to utilize their production of veterinary tools.

In 1991, Neogen purchased WTT, a 1988 spinoff company of the University of Kentucky that licensed the technology the college had developed. Named for the company's founding professors David Watt, Hsin-Hsiung "Daniel" Tai, and Thomas Tobin, WTT manufactured drug-detection tests for the horse racing industry. The ELISA (enzyme-linked immunoassay) tests allowed officials to test for performance-enhancing drugs that were difficult to detect in 1988.

In 2010, Neogen acquired the genomics-focused company GeneSeek in order to expand their focus on animal genomes and proper heredity and breeding, especially in regards to cattle.

In December 2021, 3M announced that it would merge its food-safety business with Neogen. The deal, with an enterprise value of about $5.3 billion, closed in September 2022.

== Products ==
Neogen focuses on supplying products for bacterial detection and proper sterilization and tool handling with antibiotics, along with genomics research products focused on gene isolation and heredity mapping. The detection products include Reveal for Salmonella Enteriditis, along with Agri-Screen and Veratox for a range of mycotoxin detections. Advancements in hydrophobic grid membrane filter (HGMF) technology led Neogen to the creation of a disposable filter in 2004 called NEO-GRID.

== Organization ==
The company operates its business through two segments including Food Safety and Animal Safety. The Food Safety segment provides diagnostic test kits and other complementary products for dangerous or unintended substances testing in both human and animal food. The Animal Safety segment is engaged in developing and supplying pharmaceuticals and medical instruments that are used in the global veterinary market. The latter segment also produces medicine to control animal disease and rodents in wide industries including agriculture and food production. In 2013, the company acquired Chem-Tech Ltd, which used to be wholly owned by Pat and Kelle Rolfes.
