= Herpes simplex research =

Science that studies the disease called herpes

Herpes simplex research includes all medical research that attempts to prevent, treat, or cure herpes, as well as fundamental research about the nature of herpes. Examples of particular herpes research include drug development, vaccines and genome editing. HSV-1 and HSV-2 are commonly thought of as oral and genital herpes respectively, but other members in the herpes family include chickenpox (varicella/zoster), cytomegalovirus, and Epstein-Barr virus. There are many more virus members that infect animals other than humans, some of which cause disease in companion animals (e.g., cats, dogs, horses) or have economic impacts in the agriculture industry (e.g., pigs, cows, sheep, chicken, oysters).

== Vaccine research ==
Various vaccine candidates have been developed, the first ones in the 1920s, but none has been successful to date.

Both herpes simplex virus types (HSV-1 and HSV-2) share a high rate of sequence homology, so the development of a prophylactic-therapeutic vaccine that proves effective against one type of the virus would likely aid in the development of the other. As of 2020, several vaccine candidates are in different stages of clinical trials.

An ideal herpes vaccine should induce immune responses adequate to prevent infection. Short of this ideal, a candidate vaccine might be considered successful if it (a) mitigates primary clinical episodes, (b) prevents colonization of the ganglia, (c) helps reduce the frequency or severity of recurrences, and (d) reduces viral shedding in actively infected or asymptomatic individuals. The fact that a live-attenuated vaccine induced better protection from HSV infection and symptoms is not new, because live-attenuated vaccines account for most of the successful vaccines in use today. However, governmental and corporate bodies seem to support the more recent and safer but possibly less effective approaches such as glycoprotein- and DNA-based vaccines.

== Vaccine design ==
Vaccine-elicited protection against HSV is challenging to achieve due to the ability of herpesviruses to evade many aspects of the mammalian immune response. As a general principle, the effectiveness of a HSV vaccine design is often inversely proportional to its safety. Subunit vaccines, which consist of individual or small groups of viral antigens, remove all risk of complications resulting from the production of vaccine-associated infectious viral particles but are limited in the degree and scope of immunity that can be produced in vaccinated individuals. Inactivated vaccines, which consist of intact viral particles, dramatically increase the repertoire of viral antigens that engender the immune response but like subunit vaccines are generally constrained to producing humoral immunity. Like inactivated vaccines, replication-defective vaccines expose the immune system to a diverse swath of HSV antigens but can produce both cellular and humoral immunity because they retain the ability to enter cells by HSV-induced membrane fusion. However, replication-defective HSV vaccines are challenging to produce at scale and offer limited immunization due to the lack of vaccine amplification. Live-attenuated vaccines are highly efficacious, potentially eliciting both cell-mediated and humoral immunity against structural and non-structural viral proteins, but their ability to replicate can result in vaccine-related illness particularly in immunocompromised individuals. Whereas subunit vaccines have proven effective against some viruses, immunity produced by subunit HSV vaccines have failed to protect humans from acquiring genital herpes in several clinical trials. In contrast, the success of the live-attenuated chickenpox vaccine demonstrates that an appropriately live-attenuated α-herpesvirus may be used to safely control human disease. The challenge of achieving vaccines that are both safe and effective has led to two opposing approaches in HSV vaccine development: increasing the efficacy of subunit vaccines (primarily by improving adjuvant formulations), and increasing the safety of live-attenuated vaccines (including the development of "non-invasive" vaccines).

== Vaccine candidates ==
The chart below is an attempt to list all known proposed HSV and varicella zoster vaccines and their characteristics. Please update with any missing information on vaccines only.

Vaccine	Company & Lead Researcher	Vaccine Type	Trial Status and Results
BNT163 / HSV-2 mRNA Trivalent Vaccine	BioNTech in collaboration with Perelman School of Medicine at the University of Pennsylvania Kevin P. Egan, Harvey Friedman, Sita Awasthi	Prophylactic HSV-2 mRNA lipid nanoparticle-encapsulated trivalent vaccine (containing gC2, gD2, gE2)	Phase I Started Phase 1 Clinical Trial In pre-clinical studies the mRNA vaccine prevented death and genital disease in 54/54 (100%) mice infected with HSV-1 and 20/20 (100%) with HSV-2, and prevented infection of the dorsal root ganglia in 29/30 (97%) mice infected with HSV-1 and 10/10 (100%) with HSV-2 First Phase I trial results have shown that BNT163 is well-tolerated with an acceptable safety profile and it induces binding antibody and neutralizing titers to HSV-2 antigens.
VC2	Louisiana State University, Rational Vaccines licensed VC2 in 2021 Gus Kousoulas	Live-attenuated HSV vaccine with small deletions in UL20 and UL53	Preclinical; The VC2 vaccine prevents HSV infection of neuronal axons and establishment of latency in animal models such as mice, guinea pig and rhesus monkeys.
R2	Thyreos Inc Gregory Smith, Gary Pickard, Ekaterina Heldwein	Prophylactic live-attenuated HSV vaccine mutated in R2 coding region of UL37	Preclinical; A single-dose vaccine effective in mice and rats against multiple neuroinvasive herpes viruses including HSV.
HSV-2 ΔgD-2	Albert Einstein College of Medicine / X-Vax Technology William Jacobs Jr & Betsy Harold	Prophylactic live-attenuated HSV-2 vaccine with US6 (gD) deleted	Preclinical; Combats HSV-1 & HSV-2 in mice. Mice who were HSV-1 positive showed strong protection from HSV-2. A direct comparison from 2025 of three herpes simplex virus-2 vaccine candidates showed a robust prophylactic efficiency of HSV-2 ΔgD-2 when the vaccine was given subcutaneously in the neck or intramuscularly in the thigh. Out of 10 mice, all survived an HSV-2 intravaginal infection, only one individual showed moderate disease.
HSV-2 gD27	Kening Wang	Live-attenuated HSV-2 vaccine with three amino acid mutations in gD	Preclinical A direct comparison from 2025 of three herpes simplex virus-2 vaccine candidates showed a robust prophylactic efficiency of HSV-2 gD27 when the vaccine was given intrarectally or intravaginally. Out of 10 mice, all survived an HSV-2 intravaginal infection and had little or no disease.
HSV-2 ICP0‾ HSV-2 0ΔNLS / Theravax / RVx-201	Rational Vaccines William Halford	Therapeutic live-attenuated HSV-2 vaccine	? An informal and unregulated vaccine trial with a total of 20 participants was conducted in Saint Kitts in 2016. No pre-approval of an institutional review board or state authority was present. Company under criminal investigation by the FDA. The vaccine was effective for most patients (17/20) but with severe side-effects for some (3/20). Rational Vaccines was sued by some study participants. In February 2026 Rational Vaccines has started to gather volunteer information regarding the planned RVx201 vaccine Phase I trial in the UK.
RVx-2001	Rational Vaccines William Halford	Prophylactic live-attenuated HSV-2 vaccine	Preclinical
RVx-1001	Rational Vaccines William Halford	Prophylactic live-attenuated HSV-1 vaccine	Preclinical
Vitaherpavac & Herpovax	Vitafarma, Russia	Inactivated HSV-1 and HSV-2 vaccine	Phase IV; Appears to be for treatment of existing patients.
HDIT101 (Monoclonal Antibody Therapy)	Heidelberg ImmunoTherapeutics GmbH Claudia Kunz, PhD	anti-HSV monoclonal antibody	Phase II; Study of HDIT101 versus Valaciclovir. Nov 2019 – Sep 2021
UB-621 (Monoclonal Antibody Therapy)	United BioPharma (Taiwanese Company with a branch in the US.) N/A	anti-HSV monoclonal antibody	Phase II; Receives US FDA Approval for UB-621 Phase 2 Trial in Recurrent Genital Herpes Patients (2019-06/11). Jun 2020 – Jun 2021

=== Live-attenuated non-invasive vaccines ===
A recent development in live-attenuated HSV vaccine design is the production of replicative vaccines that are ablated for nervous system infection. These vaccines infect the respiratory mucosa where their replication and localized spread provoke a robust immune response. The safety of these vaccines is based on their inability to invade the nervous system and establish life-long latent infections, as opposed to a general attenuation. Unlike other live-attenuated designs, these vaccines are cleared from the body once the immune response from vaccination has matured. In principle, by avoiding attenuation of HSV replication in the mucosa while removing the capacity to infect the nervous system, non-invasive vaccines have the potential to break the safety-efficacy dilemma by producing the strongest possible immune response while maintaining a high degree of safety.

The VC2 non-invasive vaccine was developed by Dr. Gus Kousoulas at Louisiana State University. VC2 encodes two attenuating mutations that together reduce HSV entry into neurons. The establishment of latency is prevented in animal models such as mice, guinea pig, and rhesus monkeys.

The R2 non-invasive vaccine was developed by Drs. Gregory Smith (Northwestern University Feinberg School of Medicine), Patricia Sollars & Gary Pickard (University of Nebraska-Lincoln), and Ekaterina Heldwein (Tufts University School of Medicine). R2 vaccines retain native replication in epithelial cells but are incapable of retrograde axonal transport and invasion of the nervous system. A single dose of the R2 vaccine passively introduced on mucosal tissues protects the nervous system from future infections and affords protection against lethal encephalitic infections in mice and rats. This vaccine strategy is noted for its effectiveness against both veterinary and clinical neuroinvasive herpesviruses. Thyreos Inc was founded to develop a herpesvirus vaccine platform based on the R2 design with targeted applications in human health, companion animal health, and livestock productivity.

=== Live-attenuated HSV-2 vaccine ===
Dr. William Halford at the Southern Illinois University (SIU) School of Medicine tested a live-attenuated HSV-2 ICP0∆NLS vaccine in 2016, before his death in June 2017. Vaccine attenuation is achieved by a mutation in ICP0 (ICP0∆NLS) that increases the vaccine strain's sensitivity to interferon responses and limits its replication. Already proven as safe and effective in rodents and eliciting 10 to 100 times greater protection against genital herpes than a glycoprotein D subunit vaccine, Halford's vaccine was tested outside of the United States, in St. Kitts in 20 human volunteers. All 20 of the participants self-reported an improvement in symptoms, but only 17 received and completed all three dosages. Blot tests showed a clear antibody response, which cannot be instigated by a placebo effect. However, the human trial was conducted without approval from the FDA or from the SIU Institutional Review Board.

In 2021 the vaccine candidate ICP0∆NLS, now under development as RVx-201, received the UK Innovation Passport, which provides an innovative licensing and access pathway (ILAP) within the UK health system.

=== Live-attenuated single-cycle replication HSV-2 vaccine ===
A study from the Albert Einstein College of Medicine, where glycoprotein D (gD-2) was deleted from the herpes cell, showed positive results when tested in mice. Researchers deleted gD-2 from the herpes virus, which is responsible for herpes microbes entering in and out of cells. The vaccine HSV-2 ΔgD-2 is still in early stages of development and more research needs to be conducted before receiving FDA approval for clinical trials. As of 2026 the development state of the HSV-2 ΔgD-2 vaccine candidate is unclear. The vaccine was detailed tested in a research study from 2025. However, the responsible development company X-VAX has ceased operation in November 2023.

=== Other vaccine exploration ===
Vitaherpavac - In patients with monotonously recurrent genital herpes infection and history of failure of standard vaccination, anti-relapse efficacy of Vitaherpavac vaccine was demonstrated after allergometry-based tailored choice of vaccine administration regimen. The used approach was associated with lower antigenic load and sensitization, more than three-fold increase in relapse-free period in 85% of treated patients and improvement of Th1-dependent immunity. The Russian vaccine Vitagerpavak — the only polyvalent vaccine in the world for treatment of the chronic gerpesvirusny infection (CGI) І and ІІ types. It is developed in scientific research institute of virology of D.I. Ivanovsky of the Russian Academy of Medical Science. More than 15 years are applied in the Russian Federation.

=== Discontinued vaccines ===
Below is a list of vaccines that are no longer being pursued.

Vaccine	Organization	Vaccine type	Reason	Final results
DISC vaccine	Cantab Pharmaceuticals	Live, Attenuated HSV vaccine with gH deleted	Discontinued in Phase I stage	No clinical or virological benefit was shown
AuRx Herpes Vaccine	AuRx	Recombinant Vector Vaccine	Inactive	N/A
Herpevac, Simplirix	GlaxoSmithKline	Prophylactic Sub Unit gD2t vaccine with alum/MPL adjuvant AS04	Failed in Phase III clinical trial	No statistically significant results found. No effect regarding HSV-2 was achieved, partial protection against HSV-1 confirmed.
Unnamed	PaxVax	Recombinant Vector Vaccine	Discontinued in pre-clinical stage, no longer appears in company's pipeline	N/A
ImmunoVEX HSV2 vaccine	Amgen, BioVex	Live, Attenuated, defective in immune evasion	Discontinued in Phase I stage, no longer appears in company's pipeline	N/A
Gen-003	Genocea	Therapeutic Sub Unit gD2/ICP4 vaccine with Matrix M2 adjuvant	Discontinued after Phase II stage	58% Reduction in Viral Shedding, 69% Reduction in Outbreaks. Spending on vaccine has ceased.
GV2207	GenVec	?	Discontinued in pre-clinical stage	N/A
Unnamed	Mymetics	?	Discontinued in pre-clinical stage, no longer appears in company's pipeline	N/A
HerpV	Agenus	Therapeutic Peptide vaccine with QS-21 adjuvant	Discontinued after Phase II stage	N/A
NE-HSV2	BlueWillow (formerly NanoBio)	?	Inactive or discontinued, no longer appears in company's pipeline	N/A
Unnamed	Auro Vaccines (formerly Profectus BioSciences)	DNA vaccine	Inactive and on hold, available for out-licensing or co-development	N/A
VCL-HB01	Vical	Therapeutic DNA vaccine with gD2+UL46/Vaxfectin adjuvant	Discontinued after Phase II stage	Trial did not show positive outcome.
Anteris HSV-2 therapeutic vaccine / COR-1	Anteris Technologies (formerly Admedus) Ian Frazer	Therapeutic DNA vaccine	Discontinued after Phase I/IIa, no longer in company's pipeline	Positive immune response to the vaccine was seen in most trial participants.
GSK3943104A / GSK3943104	GlaxoSmithKline	Therapeutic recombinant protein vaccine, adjuvanted	Discontinued after Phase I/II, no longer in company's pipeline	Did not meet study's efficacy endpoints, however no adverse safety concerns observed. TH HSV REC-003 will continue to collect further safety data.
dl5-29 / ACAM-529 / HSV-529 / SP0148	Sanofi Pasteur David Knipe	Therapeutic HSV-2 replication-defective vaccine with UL5 and UL29 deleted	Discontinued after Phase I/IIa, no longer in company's pipeline	The HSV529 vaccine was safe and elicited neutralizing antibody and modest CD4+ T-cell responses in HSV-seronegative vaccinees. However the efficacy was probably too weak for therapeutic use. A direct comparison from 2025 of three herpes simplex virus-2 vaccine candidates showed an excellent prophylactic efficiency of dl5-29 when the vaccine was given subcutaneously in the inguinal crease / neck or intramuscularly in the thigh. Out of 10 mice, all survived an HSV-2 intravaginal infection, no cases of illness have occurred, which can be interpreted as an absolute prophylactic protection.
G103	Sanofi Pasteur, Immune Design	Therapeutic HSV-2 subunit trivalent vaccine (containing gD, pUL19, pUL25)	Discontinued after Phase I/IIa, no longer in company's pipeline	Prophylactic immunization completely protected against lethal intravaginal HSV-2 infection in mice. All participants in the Phase I-IIa study showed an increase in gD2-, UL19- and UL25-specific CD4 T cells. However the efficacy was probably too weak for therapeutic use.
m-RNA-1608	Moderna	Therapeutic HSV-2 mRNA multivalent vaccine containing glycoprotein gB, gC, gD and early proteins ICP0 and ICP4	Discontinued after Phase I/II, no longer in company's pipeline	Interim data have shown that mRNA-1608 was generally safe and well-tolerated and it induced also antigen-specific immune responses. However the desired efficacy was probably too weak for therapeutic use. The mRNA-1608 vaccine research program was discontinued in November 2025.

==== Detailed Information on discontinued vaccines ====
One vaccine that was under trial was Herpevac, a vaccine against HSV-2. The National Institutes of Health (NIH) in the United States conducted phase III trials of Herpevac. In 2010, it was reported that, after 8 years of study in more than 8,000 women in the United States and Canada, there was no sign of positive results against the sexually transmitted disease caused by HSV-2 (and this despite earlier favorable interim reports).

PaxVax, a specialty vaccine company, partnered with Spector Lab at the UC San Diego Department of Cellular and Molecular Medicine regarding the development of a genital herpes viral vector vaccine. The vaccine was in the pre-clinical stage. The vaccine is no longer listed on their website as a present endeavour and has likely been discontinued.

A private company called BioVex began Phase I clinical trials for ImmunoVEX, another proposed vaccine, in March 2010. The company had commenced clinical testing in the UK with its vaccine candidate for the prevention and potentially the treatment of genital herpes. The biopharmaceutical company Amgen bought BioVex and their proposed ImmunoVEX vaccine appears to have been discontinued, furthermore it has been removed from the company's research pipeline.

A live, attenuated vaccine (which was proven very effective in clinical trials in Mexico) by the company AuRx has failed to proceed to a Phase III trial in the year 2006, due to financial reasons. The AuRx therapy was shown to be safe and decrease the occurrence of lesions by 86% after one year.

Mymetics is developing a pre-clinical preventative vaccine for HSV 1 and 2 using its virosome technology. There has not been any recent announcement by the company regarding their vaccine, which seems to have been taken off from the company's research product pipeline.

HerpV, a genital herpes vaccine candidate manufactured by the company Agenus, announced Phase II clinical trial results in June 2014. Results showed up to a 75% reduction in viral load and a weak reduction in viral shedding by 14%. These results were achieved after a series of vaccinations and a booster dose after six months, signalling the vaccine may take time to become effective. Further testing results are to show if the vaccine is a viable candidate against genital herpes. There has not been any recent announcement by Agenus regarding the vaccine HerpV, which seems to have been taken off from the company's research product pipeline.

Genocea Biosciences has developed GEN-003, a first-in-class protein subunit T cell-enabled therapeutic vaccine, or immunotherapy, designed to reduce the duration and severity of clinical symptoms associated with moderate-to-severe HSV-2, and to control transmission of the infection. GEN-003 includes the antigens ICP4 and gD2, as well as the proprietary adjuvant Matrix-M. GEN-003 had concluded Phase IIa clinical trials. In December 2015, Genocea announced interim data showing a 58% decrease in viral shedding and a 69% decrease in genital lesions. They also showed one of the doses stopped outbreaks for at least 6 months. GEN-003 was undergoing a Phase IIb clinical trial in the United States. Genocea has announced it would shift their strategic efforts to cancer vaccines while at the same time heavily cutting down on research and development of GEN-003 vaccine against genital herpes. Being unable to secure funding or partnering with another company, Genocea's further vaccine development remains to be determined.

Vical had been awarded grant funding from the National Institute of Allergy and Infectious Diseases division of the NIH to develop a plasmid DNA-based vaccine to inhibit recurring lesions in patients latently infected with herpes simplex virus type 2 (HSV-2). The plasmid DNA encoding the HSV-2 antigens was formulated with Vaxfectin, Vical's proprietary cationic lipid adjuvant. Vical is concluding Phase I clinical trials, while reporting data showing the vaccine candidate failed to meet the primary endpoint. The San Diego-based company was forced to concede that their herpes strategy had misfired, with their vaccine failing to perform as well as a placebo. However, that seemed to may have changed, since 20 June 2016, when Vical released phase I/II results at ASM. Their vaccine (named VCL-HB01) was involved in a Phase II clinical trial. The recent trial, similarly to a past trial again missed the primary endpoint and therefore the company is discontinuing the vaccine and moving to other pipeline products.

Research conducted by the NanoBio Corporation, later known as BlueWillow Biologics, indicates that an enhanced protection from HSV-2 is a result of mucosal immunity which can be elicited by their intranasal nanoemulsion vaccine. BlueWillow Biologics published results showing efficiency in studies conducted in both the prophylactic and the therapeutic guinea pig model. This included preventing infection and viral latency in 92% of animals vaccinated and a reduction in recurrent legions by 64% and viral shedding by 53%. NanoBio hoped to raise funds in 2016 to enter into Phase I clinical testing. As of 2026 the status of the BlueWillow Biologics vaccine candidate NE-HSV2 is unclear. It is no longer listed on the company's website.

Profectus BioSciences intended to use its PBS Vax therapeutic vaccine technology to engineer a vaccine for HSV-2. The vaccine was in early development state and not much is known about its viability. In 2020 Profectus BioSciences was acquired by the Indian pharmaceutical company Aurobindo Pharma and became as Auro Vaccines LLC an official subsidiary. As of 2026 the vaccine development seems to be on hold.

Biomedical Research Models, a Worcester-based bio-pharmaceutical company which was acquired by JOINN Laboratories in 2019 has been awarded a fund for the development of a novel vaccine platform to combat mucosally transmitted pathogens such as HSV-2. As of 2026 the vaccine development seems to be inactive or discontinued, the company website no longer lists a HSV vaccine candidate.

The company Tomegavax, acquired by Vir Biotechnology in 2017, explored the use of cytomegalovirus vectors in the development of a therapeutic vaccine against herpes simplex virus 2 (HSV-2), the causative agent of genital herpes. It has been awarded a grant by the NIH for this purpose. The company website no longer lists as of 2026 any HSV vaccine candidate.

SL VaxiGen, a South Korean biopharmaceutical company, developed a DNA based HSV-2 vaccine candidate described as SL-V20. As of 2026 the company seems to be no longer active and the company website is no longer reachable.

Sanofi Pasteur and the clinical-stage immunotherapy company Immune Design had entered in 2014 a broad collaboration, which examined the potential of various combinations of agents against HSV-2, including an adjuvanted trivalent vaccine candidate G103, consisting of recombinantly-expressed viral proteins. The G103 vaccine candidate was discontinued in 2022 after Phase I/IIa clinical trial.

Redbiotec, a privately held Swiss biopharmaceutical company, based in Zurich as a spin-off of the ETH Zurich, was focusing on the development of a therapeutic vaccine against HSV-2. Redbiotec's preclinical vaccine showed over 90% of lesion score (vs. approx. 50% for GEN-003 of Genocea) in early findings. In 2022 Redbiotec's HSV-2 vaccine program was outlicensed to Eurocine Vaccines (Sweden). Eurocine Vaccines stopped its operations as a biopharmaceutical company on May 29, 2024, via a reverse takeover in conjunction with the Nidhogg Resources AB company. The new company business activities are the exploration and extraction of base metals, precious metals, and rare earth elements, as well as the exploration of oil and natural gas and the production of hydrogen, and related activities.

==== DNA-based vaccine COR-1 ====
Professor Ian Frazer developed an experimental vaccine with his team at Coridon, a biotechnology company he founded in 2000. The company, later known under the name Admedus Vaccines, was researching DNA technology for vaccines with prophylactic and therapeutic potential. What was different about this vaccine was the way that response was being created. Instead of introducing a weakened version of the herpes virus or protein subunit, this vaccine used a small section of DNA to produce T-cells and stimulate the immune response. The new vaccine candidate was designed to prevent new infections, and to treat those who already have the infection. In February 2014, it was announced that Frazer's vaccine against genital herpes passed human safety trials in a trial of 20 Australians. In October 2014, Admedus announced success in creating a positive T-cell response in 95% of participants. Further research was required to determine if the vaccine was able to prevent transmission. In July 2014, Admedus increased its stake in Frazer's vaccines by 16.2%. In addition, $18.4 million was posted as funds raised towards Phase II vaccine testing and research.

The HSV-2 Phase II trial began in April 2015. Interim results were published on 4 March 2016, and based on the results of a scheduled, blinded, pooled analysis of data from the first 20 patients to receive at least three vaccinations in the randomised, placebo controlled Phase II study with the following results:

- No safety issues have been noted in this cohort of patients. The data remains blinded to protect the integrity of the trial.
- Study participants had a marked decrease in viral lesions (outbreaks) with a drop of over 90% in the monthly rate versus baseline.
- The average number of days HSV-2 was detected in patients was reduced versus baseline.

On 19 October 2016, Admedus released interim results from the ongoing HSV-2 Phase IIa study. The unblinded data demonstrated a 58% reduction in viral shedding compared to baseline and a reduction in outbreaks of 52% post vaccination and 81% overall reduction post-booster.

On 1 June 2020, Admedus announced it had changed its name to Anteris Technologies Ltd., and would become a "dedicated structural heart company". No vaccines are listed in the company's most recent research report and the vaccine is likely discontinued.

==== Replication-defective HSV-2 vaccine dl5-29 ====
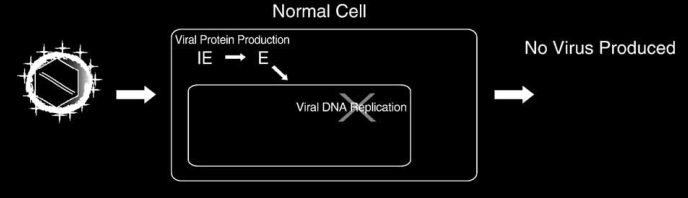
Principle of HSV529

David M. Knipe, a professor at Harvard Medical School had developed the dl5-29 vaccine which was later also known under the name ACAM-529, HSV-529 and SP0148. This was a replication-defective vaccine that had proved successful in preventing both HSV-2 and HSV-1 infections and in combating the virus in already-infected hosts, in animal models. HSV-529 was a leading vaccine candidate which had been investigated in numerous research publications, and was endorsed by many researchers in the field (i.a. Lynda A. Morrison and Jeffrey Cohen). The vaccine induced strong HSV-2-specific antibody and T-cell responses, protected against challenge with a wild-type HSV-2 virus, reduced the severity of recurrent disease, and provided cross-protection against HSV-1. In 2008 the vaccine was being researched and developed by Sanofi Pasteur.

On 28 April 2022, Sanofi announced it had discontinued a trial evaluating four HSV-2 vaccines. The pipeline section of the Sanofi website no longer lists any HSV vaccine candidate in active development.

Although discontinued by Sanofi Pasteur, the vaccine is still tested in smaller trials like for example a comparative study from 2025. The results reconfirm an excellent prophylactic protection of dl5-29.

== Genome editing ==
Another area of research for HSV treatment or a potential cure is the use of genome editing. It is thought that by cleaving the DNA of HSV that infects neurons, thereby causing destruction or mutational inactivation of the HSV DNA, the virus can be greatly treated or even cured.

=== Notable research ===
The Jerome Lab run by Keith R. Jerome at the Fred Hutchinson Cancer Research Center has looked at using zinc finger nuclease as well as endonuclease to prevent HSV from replicating. Most recently Jerome and his lab were able to demonstrate cleavage of latent HSV in a living organism, which is vital to disabling the virus. On 18 August 2020, the team led by Jerome and Martine Aubert published a paper in Nature Communications showing that, through a series of incremental improvements on their original method, they had destroyed up to 95% of herpes virus lurking in certain nerve clusters of mice, with 3 years of work expected before clinical trials are considered.

Editas Medicine, that previously collaborated with the Cullen Lab, are researching CRISPR-Cas9 for its use in Herpes Simplex Keratitis.

Researchers at Temple University have been researching how to disrupt HSV from replicating that could eventually lead to a cure. Some members of research team at Temple University have also joined forces to create Excision BioTherapeutics. The company intends to begin clinical trials in 2022.

Researchers at the University Medical Center Utrecht, using the CRISPR-Cas9 system, have shown promising results in clearing HSV-1 infection by simultaneously targeting multiple essential vital genes in vitro. The researchers are now looking at targeting latent HSV-1 genomes and are investigating in vivo model systems to assess the potential therapeutic application.

In 2021, scientists in China described a CRISPR-Cas9 genome editing approach which could be used to treat HSV-1 in corneal stroma: injection of engineered lentiviruses into the affected anatomical regions for transient editing without inducing off-target edits.

== Herpes simplex pharmaceutical drugs ==
Johnston, Gottlieb & Wald 2016 published an overview of the state of research.

=== Pharmaceutical drugs ===
Since the introduction of the nucleoside analogs decades ago, treatment of herpes simplex virus (HSV) infections has not seen much innovation, except for the development of their respective prodrugs (Aciclovir, Famciclovir, Valacilovir..). Drawbacks such as poor bioavailability or limited effectiveness of these drugs require further research effort of new pharmaceutical drugs against the herpes simplex disease. The inhibitors of the Helicase-primase complex of HSV represent a very innovative approach to the treatment of herpesvirus disease.

Pharmaceutical Drug	Company	Lead Researcher	Type	Status
Aciclovir	patents expired	Schaeffer & B. Elion	nucleic acid analogue	In Production
Valaciclovir	patents expired	?	nucleic acid analogue	In Production
Famciclovir	patents expired	?	nucleic acid analogue	In Production
Amenamevir	Astellas Pharma Inc	Kiyomitsu Katsumata	helicase-primase inhibitor	In Production
Pritelivir	AiCuris Anti-infective Cures AG	?	helicase-primase inhibitor	Phase III
ABI-5366	Assembly Biosciences	?	helicase-primase inhibitor	Phase Ib Assembly Biosciences Doses First Participant in Phase 1a/b Clinical Trial of Herpes Simplex Virus Helicase-Primase Inhibitor Candidate ABI-5366. Interim data expected in 1H 2025.
IM-250	Innovative Molecules GmbH	?	helicase-primase inhibitor	Phase I completed
BX795	?	Deepak Shukla	kinase inhibitor	Preclinical
SADBE	Squarex, LLC	Hugh McTavish, PhD, JD	Topical immunological adjuvant	Phase II
Docosanol	GlaxoSmithKline, Avanir	?	Topical cell entry inhibitor	In Production

=== Notable progress ===
Researchers have made a Hammerhead ribozyme that targets and cleaves the mRNA of essential genes in HSV-1. The hammerhead, which targets the mRNA of the UL20 gene, greatly reduced the level of HSV-1 ocular infection in rabbits, and reduced the viral yield in vivo. The gene-targeting approach uses a specially designed RNA enzyme to inhibit strains of the herpes simplex virus. The enzyme disables a gene responsible for producing a protein involved in the maturation and release of viral particles in an infected cell. The technique appears to be effective in experiments with mice and rabbits, but further research is required before it can be attempted in people infected with herpes.

In 2016, researchers showed that the genome editing technology known as CRISPR/Cas can be used to limit viral replication in multiple strains of herpesviruses, in some cases even eliminating the infection altogether. The researchers tested three different strains of herpesviruses: Epstein-Barr virus, the cause of mononucleosis and some cancers; Herpes simplex viruses (HSV-1) and (HSV-2), which cause cold sores and genital herpes respectively; and human cytomegalovirus, which causes congenital herpes. The results indicated that CRISPR can be used to eliminate replication in all three strains of the virus, but that the technology was so far only successful in actually eradicating Epstein-Barr virus. The authors think this may be because the Epstein-Barr virus genome is located in dividing cells that are easily accessible to CRISPR. Comparatively, the HSV-1 genome targeted by CRISPR is located in closed-off, non-replicating neurons, which makes reaching the genome much more challenging.

Another possibility to eradicate the HSV-1 variant is being pursued by a team at Duke University. By figuring out how to switch all copies of the virus in the host from latency to their active stage at the same time, rather than the way the virus copies normally stagger their activity stage, leaving some dormant somewhere at all times, it is thought that immune system could kill the entire infected cell population, since they can no longer hide in the nerve cells. This is a potentially risky approach especially for patients with widespread infections as there is the possibility of significant tissue damage from the immune response. One class of drugs called antagomir could trigger reactivation. These are chemically engineered oligonucleotides or short segments of RNA, that can be made to mirror their target genetic material, namely herpes microRNAs. They could be engineered to attach and thus 'silence' the microRNA, thus rendering the virus incapable of keeping latent in their host. Professor Cullen believes a drug could be developed to block the microRNA whose job it is to suppress HSV-1 into latency.

==== Oncolytic ====
Herpes has been used in research with HeLa cells to determine its ability to assist in the treatment of malignant tumors. A study conducted using suicide gene transfer by a cytotoxic approach examined a way to eradicate malignant tumors. Gene therapy is based on the cytotoxic genes that directly or indirectly kill tumor cells regardless of its gene expression. In this case the study uses the transfer of the Herpes simplex virus type I thymidine kinase (HSVtk) as the cytotoxic gene. Hela cells were used in these studies because they have very little ability to communicate through gap junctions. The Hela cells involved were grown in a monolayer culture and then infected with the HSV virus. The HSV mRNA was chosen because it is known to share characteristics with normal eukaryotic mRNA.

The HSVtk expression results in the phosphorylation of drug nucleoside analogues; in this case the drug ganciclovir, an antiviral medication used to treat and prevent cytomegaloviruses, converts it into the nucleoside analogue triphosphates. Once granciclovir is phosphorylated through HSV-tk it is then incorporating DNA strands when the cancer cells are multiplying. The nucleotide from the ganciclovir is what inhibits the DNA polymerization and the replication process. This causes the cell to die via apoptosis.

Apoptosis is regulated with the help of miRNAs, which are small non-coding RNAs that negatively regulate gene expression. These miRNAs play a critical role in developing the timing, differentiation and death of cells. The miRNAs effect on apoptosis has affected cancer development by the regulation of cell proliferation, as well as cell transformation. Avoidance of apoptosis is critical for the success of malignant tumors, and one way for miRNAs to possibly influence cancer development is to regulate apoptosis. In order to support this claim, Hela cells were used for the experiment discussed.

The cytotoxic drug used, ganciclovir, is capable of destroying via apoptosis transduced cells and non-transduced cells from the cellular gap junction. This technique is known as the "bystander effect," which has suggested to scientists that the effect of some therapeutic agents may be enhanced by diffusion through gap junctional intercellular communication (GJIC) or cell coupling. GJIC is an important function in the maintaining of tissue homeostasis and it is a critical factor in balance of cells dying and surviving.

When Hela cells were transfected with the HSV-tk gene, and were then put in a culture with nontransfected cells, only the HSV-tk transfected Hela cells were killed by the granciclovir, leaving the nonviral cells unharmed. The Hela cells were transfected with the encoding for the gap junction protein connexin 43 (Cx43) to provide a channel that permits ions and other molecules to move between neighboring cells. Both Hela cells with the HSV-tk and without the HSV-tk were destroyed. This result has led to the evidence needed to state that the bystander effect in the HSV-tk gene therapy is possibly due to the Cx-mediated GJIC.

== Other research ==
=== Amino acids (Arginine, Lysine) - Cold sores ===
Research from 1964 into amino acid requirements of herpes simplex virus in human cells indicated that "...the lack of arginine or histidine, and possibly the presence of lysine, would interfere markedly with virus synthesis", but concludes that "no ready explanation is available for any of these observations".

Further medical evidence indicates that "absorbing more arginine may indirectly cause cold sores by disrupting the body's balance of arginine and another amino acid called lysine."

Further reviews conclude that "lysine's efficacy for herpes labialis may lie more in prevention than treatment." and that "the use of lysine for decreasing the severity or duration of outbreaks" is not supported, while further research is needed.

=== Essential oils ===
HSV is found to be susceptible to many essential oils and their constituents, however there is concern with the cutaneous use of essential oils is the degree of skin and mucous membrane irritation.

== Advocacy ==
In April 2020, a subreddit group r/HerpesCureResearch, was formed to advocate for cure research and better treatment of HSV. Members raised funds for Fred Hutch's genome editing treatment and UPenn's mRNA vaccine research as well as forming a Herpes Cure Advocacy group in which the group is raising awareness on the health complications associated with HSV.
