= Peter M. Howley =

American physician

- Occupation: Virologist, university teacher, pathologist, researcher, medical doctor, senior lecturer
- Employer: Harvard Medical School (1993–); Massachusetts General Hospital (1972–1973); National Cancer Institute (1984–1993); National Institute of Allergy and Infectious Diseases (1973–1975); National Institutes of Health; University of York
- Awards: Paul Ehrlich and Ludwig Darmstaedter Prize (1994)

Peter Maxwell Howley (born October 9, 1946) is an American pathologist, virologist, and professor at Harvard Medical School. He has been president of the American Society for Virology and the American Society for Investigative Pathology and a co-editor of the Annual Review of Pathology: Mechanisms of Disease.

== Biography ==
Howley was born in New Brunswick, New Jersey. He graduated in 1968 from Princeton University with an A.B. in chemistry and in 1970 from Rutgers University with an M.M.S. (Master of Medical Science) degree. In 1972 he graduated with an M.D. from Harvard Medical School. From 1972 to 1973 he worked as an intern in pathology at Massachusetts General Hospital. He was a research associate from 1973 to 1975 at the National Institute of Allergy and Infectious Diseases (NIAID) in Bethesda, Maryland. In 1977 he was granted board certification in anatomic pathology. At the NCI's Laboratory of Pathology, Howley was from 1975 to 1976 a resident, from 1976 to 1977 a junior staff pathologist, from 1977 to 1979 a senior investigator, and from 1979 to 1984 Chief of the Viral Oncology and Molecular Pathology Section. From 1984 to 1993 he was Chief of the NCI's Laboratory of Tumor Virus Biology. In 1991, Howley became the George Fabyan Professor of Comparative Pathology at Harvard Medical School. He was the president of the American Society for Virology from 1998 to 1999 and the president of the American Society for Investigative Pathology in 2006. By 2009 he was the Shattuck Professor of Pathology.

Howley is considered to be a leader in research on papillomaviruses. Howley and his co-workers created gene maps of many species of papillomaviruses and analyzed their transcription patterns and systems of transcription regulation. The research identified papillomavirus oncogenes and the molecular mechanisms of their damaging effects. This work is considered fundamental for the understanding of the pathogenesis of papillomaviruses at the molecular level.

His research also involves assessing the roles of the E6AP/UBE3A ubiquitin ligase in human neurogenetic disorders.

Peter M. Howley and David M. Knipe have been co-editors-in-chief, since the 3rd edition, of Fields Virology, a standard work on virology, with 5th edition published in 2006 and 6th edition published in 2013. Howley is also one of the chief editors of The Molecular Basis of Cancer, published by Elsevier. He was a co-editor of the Annual Review of Pathology: Mechanisms of Disease from 2007–2015. He is a member of the editorial board of the Proceedings of the National Academy of Sciences.

He is married with three children.

Peter M. Howley should not be confused with Paul M. Howley, who is a managing director of the vaccine biotechnology firm VAXMED Pty Ltd in Melbourne, Australia.

== Awards and honors ==
- 1983 — Warner-Lamber/Parke-David Award of the American Society for Experimental Pathology
- 1986 — Wallace P. Rowe Award of the National Institute of Allergy and Infectious Diseasesfor
- 1997 — Member, American Society for Clinical Investigation
- 1993 — Member of the National Academy of Sciences
- 1994 — Paul Ehrlich and Ludwig Darmstaedter Prize (also awarded to Harald zur Hausen)
- 1996 — Fellow of the American Academy of Arts & Sciences
- 2004 — Rous-Whipple Award of the American Society for Investigative Pathology
- 2011 — Keynote speaker at the Convocation Ceremony of the Robert Wood Johnson Medical School
- 2015 — NCI Outstanding Investigator Award, National Cancer Institute

== Selected publications ==
- Lowy, Douglas R.; Dvoretzky, Israel; Shober, Ralph; Law, Ming-Fan; Engel, Linda; Howley, Peter M. (1980). "In vitro tumorigenic transformation by a defined sub-genomic fragment of bovine papilloma virus DNA". Nature. 287 (5777): 72–74. Bibcode:1980Natur.287...72L. doi:10.1038/287072a0. PMID 6251381. S2CID 4278780. 1980
- Law, M. F.; Lowy, D. R.; Dvoretzky, I.; Howley, P. M. (1981). "Mouse cells transformed by bovine papillomavirus contain only extrachromosomal viral DNA sequences". Proceedings of the National Academy of Sciences. 78 (5): 2727–2731. Bibcode:1981PNAS...78.2727L. doi:10.1073/pnas.78.5.2727. PMC 319430. PMID 6265905. 1981
- Chen, Ellson Y.; Howley, Peter M.; Levinson, Arthur D.; Seeburg, Peter H. (1982). "The primary structure and genetic organization of the bovine papillomavirus type 1 genome". Nature. 299 (5883): 529–534. Bibcode:1982Natur.299..529C. doi:10.1038/299529a0. hdl:21.11116/0000-0000-F41B-F. PMID 6289124. S2CID 4330135. 1982
- Yang, Y. C.; Okayama, H.; Howley, P. M. (1985). "Bovine papillomavirus contains multiple transforming genes". Proceedings of the National Academy of Sciences. 82 (4): 1030–1034. Bibcode:1985PNAS...82.1030Y. doi:10.1073/pnas.82.4.1030. PMC 397187. PMID 2983327. 1985
- Gendelman, H. E.; Phelps, W.; Feigenbaum, L.; Ostrove, J. M.; Adachi, A.; Howley, P. M.; Khoury, G.; Ginsberg, H. S.; Martin, M. A. (1986). "Trans-activation of the human immunodeficiency virus long terminal repeat sequence by DNA viruses". Proceedings of the National Academy of Sciences. 83 (24): 9759–9763. Bibcode:1986PNAS...83.9759G. doi:10.1073/pnas.83.24.9759. PMC 387220. PMID 2432602. 1986
- Dyson, N.; Howley, P.; Munger, K.; Harlow, E. (1989). "The human papilloma virus-16 E7 oncoprotein is able to bind to the retinoblastoma gene product". Science. 243 (4893): 934–937. Bibcode:1989Sci...243..934D. doi:10.1126/science.2537532. PMID 2537532. 1989
- Werness, B.; Levine, A.; Howley, P. (1990). "Association of human papillomavirus types 16 and 18 E6 proteins with p53". Science. 248 (4951): 76–79. Bibcode:1990Sci...248...76W. doi:10.1126/science.2157286. PMID 2157286. 1990
- Huibregtse, J.M.; Scheffner, M.; Howley, P.M. (1991). "A cellular protein mediates association of p53 with the E6 oncoprotein of human papillomavirus types 16 or 18". The EMBO Journal. 10 (13): 4129–4135. doi:10.1002/j.1460-2075.1991.tb04990.x. PMC 453163. PMID 1661671. 1991
- Scheffner, M.; Munger, K.; Byrne, J. C.; Howley, P. M. (1991). "The state of the p53 and retinoblastoma genes in human cervical carcinoma cell lines". Proceedings of the National Academy of Sciences. 88 (13): 5523–5527. Bibcode:1991PNAS...88.5523S. doi:10.1073/pnas.88.13.5523. PMC 51909. PMID 1648218. 1991
- Chellappan, S.; Kraus, V. B.; Kroger, B.; Munger, K.; Howley, P. M.; Phelps, W. C.; Nevins, J. R. (1992). "Adenovirus E1A, simian virus 40 tumor antigen, and human papillomavirus E7 protein share the capacity to disrupt the interaction between transcription factor E2F and the retinoblastoma gene product". Proceedings of the National Academy of Sciences. 89 (10): 4549–4553. Bibcode:1992PNAS...89.4549C. doi:10.1073/pnas.89.10.4549. PMC 49120. PMID 1316611. S2CID 23812634. 1992
- Huibregtse, J. M.; Scheffner, M.; Beaudenon, S.; Howley, P. M. (1995). "A family of proteins structurally and functionally related to the E6-AP ubiquitin-protein ligase". Proceedings of the National Academy of Sciences. 92 (7): 2563–2567. Bibcode:1995PNAS...92.2563H. doi:10.1073/pnas.92.7.2563. PMC 42258. PMID 7708685. 1995
- Tong, X.; Howley, P. M. (1997). "The bovine papillomavirus E6 oncoprotein interacts with paxillin and disrupts the actin cytoskeleton". Proceedings of the National Academy of Sciences. 94 (9): 4412–4417. Bibcode:1997PNAS...94.4412T. doi:10.1073/pnas.94.9.4412. PMC 20736. PMID 9114003. 1997
- Wathelet, Marc G; Lin, Charles H; Parekh, Bhavin S; Ronco, Lucienne V; Howley, Peter M; Maniatis, Tom (1998). "Virus Infection Induces the Assembly of Coordinately Activated Transcription Factors on the IFN-β Enhancer In Vivo". Molecular Cell. 1 (4): 507–518. doi:10.1016/S1097-2765(00)80051-9. ISSN 1097-2765. PMID 9660935.
- Huang, L.; Kinnucan, E.; Wang, G.; Beaudenon, S.; Howley, P. M.; Huibregtse, J. M.; Pavletich, N. P. (1999). "Structure of an E6AP-UbcH7 Complex: Insights into Ubiquitination by the E2-E3 Enzyme Cascade". Science. 286 (5443): 1321–1326. doi:10.1126/science.286.5443.1321. PMID 10558980. 1999
- Münger, Karl; Howley, Peter M (2002). "Human papillomavirus immortalization and transformation functions". Virus Research. 89 (2): 213–228. doi:10.1016/S0168-1702(02)00190-9. ISSN 0168-1702. PMID 12445661.
- Howley, P. M. (2006). "Warts, Cancer and Ubiquitylation: Lessons from the Papillomaviruses". Transactions of the American Clinical and Climatological Association. 117: 113–127. PMC 1500926. PMID 18528468.
- White, E. A.; Sowa, M. E.; Tan, M. J. A.; Jeudy, S.; Hayes, S. D.; Santha, S.; Münger, K.; Harper, J. W.; Howley, P. M. (2012). "Systematic identification of interactions between host cell proteins and E7 oncoproteins from diverse human papillomaviruses". Proceedings of the National Academy of Sciences. 109 (5): E260–E267. doi:10.1073/pnas.1116776109. ISSN 0027-8424. PMC 3277141. PMID 22232672.
- Howley, Peter M.; Pfister, Herbert J. (2015). "Beta genus papillomaviruses and skin cancer". Virology. 479–480: 290–296. doi:10.1016/j.virol.2015.02.004. ISSN 0042-6822. PMC 4424140. PMID 25724416.
