= Ectoplasm (cell biology) =

Part of a cell's cytoplasm

Ectoplasm, also called exoplasm, is the clear, gel-like, and agranular outer portion of the cytoplasm in protists, that lies just beneath the cell membrane. In other eukaryotes it is known as the cell cortex. It contains actin filaments, allowing the ectoplasm to play a significant role in cellular movement and shape. In contrast, the endoplasm is the inner portion of the cytoplasm located between the ectoplasm and the nuclear envelope that contains most of the cell's organelles and is metabolically active. Ectoplasm's dynamic nature, facilitated by actin and myosin interactions, contributes to cellular processes such as spindle formation during cellular division, amoeboid movement. slime mold flow networks, The differentiation of cytoplasm into ectoplasm and endoplasm is also regarded as a milestone in cellular evolution.

The term "ectoplasm" originates from the Ancient Greek words ἐκτός (ektos), meaning "outside," and πλάσμα (plasma), meaning "anything formed." In most eukaryotes it has been replaced with cell cortex.

== History and terminology ==
In the 1800s, German biologist Ernst Haeckel was the first person to use the term "ectoplasm" to describe the clear peripheral component of cytoplasm. Haeckel observed cytoplasm in unicellular organisms, specifically in amoebas during amoeboid movement, and he differentiated ectoplasm from the interior endoplasm. He also noted that ectoplasm is involved in the extension of pseudopodia in amoebas.

In the early 1900s, spiritualists used the term "ectoplasm" to describe a gel-like fluid believed to be linked to spiritual energy that allegedly leaked from mediums during spiritual practices. However, there is no scientific evidence for this claim, and it is unrelated to ectoplasm from a cellular perspective.

== Structure and function ==
Ectoplasm is a gel-like, clear, and agranular fluid located below the cell membrane. Ectoplasm's rich actin and microfilament composition, along with actomyosin interactions, cause its gel-like viscosity. Ectoplasm completely surrounds the endoplasm, providing a protective layer for the endoplasm and its organelles. It is a ridged structure with actin located throughout to support cellular shape and elasticity.

Actin and myosin interactions in the ectoplasm provide structure and cellular movement. Linear actin filaments generate contractile force, while branched actin disperses force. Both filaments work together in ectoplasm to provide efficient movement and structure. Actin and heavy meromyosin combine to form actomyosin complexes. These complexes create ectoplasm tubes, which allow cytoplasmic streaming. The actomyosin complexes often attach to the cellular membrane, allowing cellular movement on the membrane side of the ectoplasm and cellular support. This actin and myosin interaction is comparable to actin and myosin sliding past one another in muscular contraction, but the interaction is on a smaller scale in the ectoplasm. Spindle fibers used in cellular division for mitosis and meiosis are also constituted of actin filaments from the ectoplasm.

Ectoplasm changes its shape by converting between globular (G-actin) and filamentous (F-actin) forms. Low ionic concentrations promote G-actin formation, while metallic cations and ATP promote F-actin formation. The interconversion of G-actin to F-actin is responsible for the sol (liquid) to gel (gel-like) conversion, with G-actin representing sol, and F-actin representing gel.

== Examples of ectoplasm in cellular processes ==
=== Amoeboid movement ===
Amoeboid movement, which involves extending pseudopodia, relies on both ectoplasm and endoplasm. A change in pH stimulates the ectoplasm to change the direction of pseudopodia in the amoeba. Ionic changes and osmotic pressure cause the amoeba to undergo a gel-sol (gel-like to liquid) conversion in the ectoplasm. Actin depolymerization causes this transition to liquid, and the sol ectoplasm streams forward, extending the pseudopodium. Osmotic pressure then pushes the sol endoplasmic fluid into the extended pseudopodium. The endoplasm converts from sol to gel as the actin and myosin complex reforms, solidifying the pseudopodium. On the other end of the cell, the ectoplasm transitions from a gel to a sol, forcing cellular components toward the extension. Throughout this process, ectoplasm and endoplasm are repeatedly converted into one another. Cyclic movement occurs as endoplasm becomes ectoplasm at the tip of the pseudopodium, while ectoplasm becomes endoplasm at the posterior of the pseudopodium. Ectoplasm also forms an ectoplasmic tube when food is present, allowing the amoeba to consume the food and convert the tube to a food vacuole. Macrophages in the human immune system also utilize ectoplasm to move by amoeboid movement.

=== Flow network in slime molds ===
Slime molds utilize a flow network composed of ectoplasm tubes (gel) that transport endoplasm (sol). Ectoplasm forms these tubules with actomyosin interactions. These fibers undergo peristaltic contractions, pushing the endoplasm throughout the flow network. Changes in the diameter of the tubules determine the slime mold's behavior, allowing it to change direction. This network also channels nutrients and signals throughout the slime mold, making it adaptable to the environment. This adaptability allows slime molds to solve mazes and optimize networks throughout their surroundings.

=== Sertoli cells and reproduction ===
Sertoli cells, located in the mammalian testes, form junctions called ectoplasmic specializations with sperm cells to facilitate sperm development. Ectoplasmic specializations are Tight junctions composed of actin situated between the plasma membrane and the endoplasmic reticulum. The proper formation of the blood–testis barrier relies on this ectoplasm, and these ectoplasmic specializations facilitate the movement of spermatogenic cells through the seminiferous epithelium during spermatogenesis. Toxins such as cadmium damage the ectoplasmic specializations, inhibiting proper sperm development and disrupting the blood-testis barrier.

== Evolutionary significance ==
In the 1930s, Dr. Ernest E. Just proposed that the differentiation of cytoplasm into ectoplasm and endoplasm allowed the dynamic evolution of the cell. Since the ectoplasm is the outermost portion of the cell, excluding the cell membrane, he theorized that the evolution of the ectoplasm dramatically changed cellular interaction with the environment. Specifically, the evolution of ectoplasm allowed organisms to contract and conduct. Contraction of the cytoplasm gave way to cytoplasmic streaming in amoebas and cilia in protozoans. Conduction allowed fertilization to occur and egg cells to develop preventative measures against double fertilization. Dr. Just concluded that organisms evolved faster based on the amount of differentiation of their cytoplasm into ectoplasm and endoplasm due to the dynamic processes that ectoplasm allows. Dr. Just's ideas are supported by the modern understanding of ectoplasm as a crucial component in cellular motility and structure.
