= Fabio Beltram =

Italian physicist

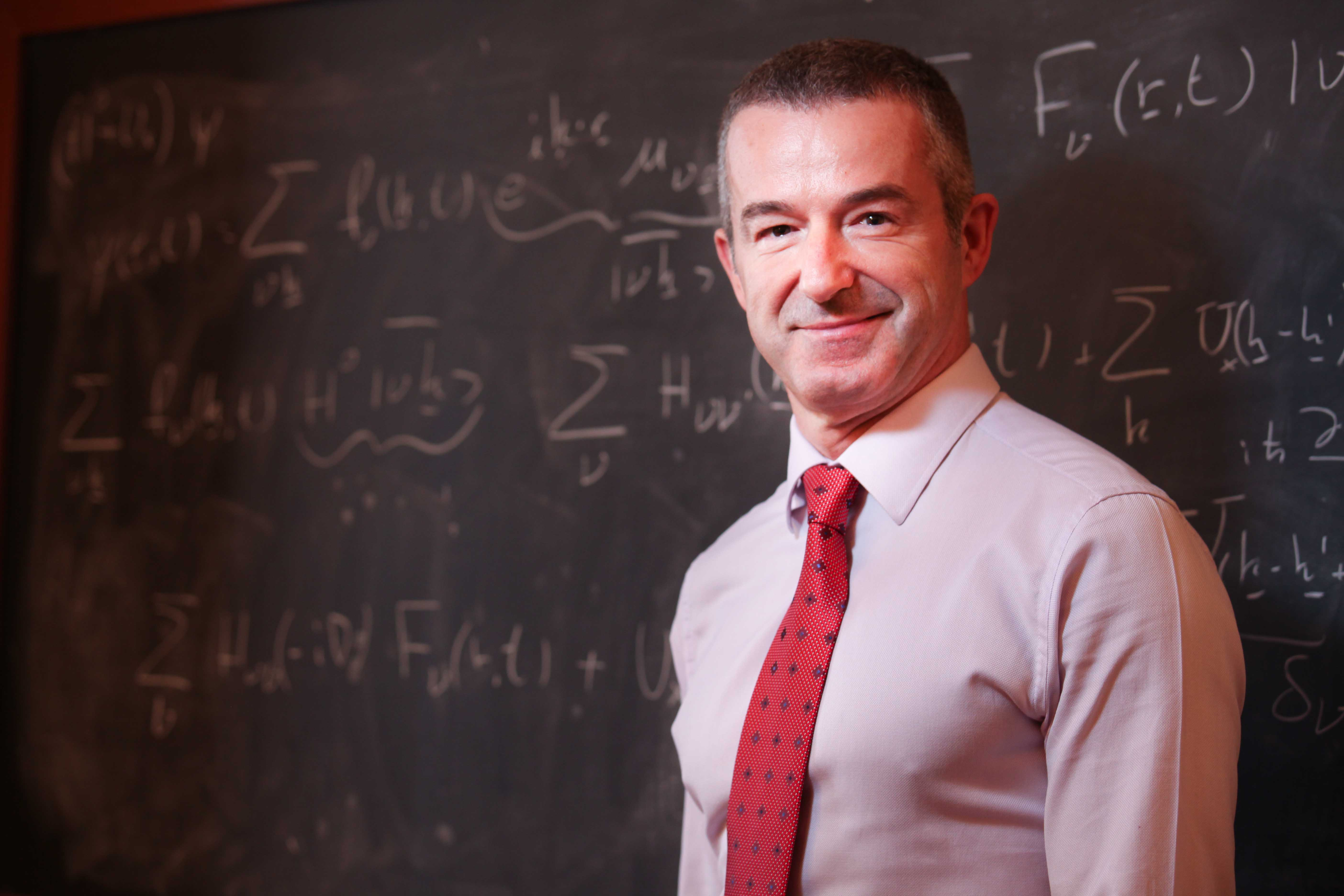
- Fabio Beltram
- Citizenship: Italian
- Education: University of Trieste; University of Bologna
- Scientific career
- Fields: Condensed matter physics, nanoscience, nanotechnology
- Workplaces: Scuola Normale Superiore

Fabio Beltram is an Italian physicist, academic and researcher known for his contributions to condensed matter physics, nanoscience, and semiconductor research.

Beltram is a full professor of condensed matter physics at the Scuola Normale Superiore in Pisa.

== Education and career ==
Beltram received a degree in electronic engineering from the University of Trieste in 1985 and a degree in physics from the University of Bologna in 1988. He spent five years as a researcher in the United States at AT&T Bell Laboratories before returning to Italy in 1992, when he joined the Scuola Normale Superiore as an associate professor of condensed matter physics. He served as Deputy Director of the institution from 2005 to 2010 and as Director from 2010 to 2016, during which he oversaw a major institutional expansion, including the incorporation of the Italian Institute of Human Sciences (SUM) and the strengthening of the school's international profile. Since 2016, he has been President of the Fondazione Pisana per la Scienza ETS.

== Research ==
Beltram's early research focused on the physics and applications of semiconductor heterostructures. His subsequent work has encompassed the physics of low-dimensional systems, quantum devices, nanostructured materials, semiconductor nanostructures, and hybrid superconductor–semiconductor systems. Following his return to Italy, he established research and educational programs at the Scuola Normale Superiore in semiconductor nanostructures and hybrid superconductor–semiconductor systems, with a particular emphasis on quantum science and quantum technologies.

== Awards and honors ==
- 2007: Commendatore, Order of Merit of the Italian Republic
- 2008: Fellow, American Physical Society
- 2014: Grande Ufficiale, Order of Merit of the Italian Republic

== Selected publications ==
- Arosio, D.; Ricci, F.; Marchetti, L.; Gualdani, R.; Albertazzi, L; Beltram, F. (2010). "Simultaneous intracellular chloride and pH measurements using a GFP-based sensor". Nature Methods. 7 (7): 516–518. doi:10.1038/nmeth.1471.
- Ferrari, A.; Pellegrini, V; Arcangeli, C. Fittipaldi, A; Giacca M.; Beltram, F. (2003). "Caveolae-mediated internalization of extracellular HIV-1 tat fusion proteins visualized in real time". Molecular therapy. 8: 284-294. doi:10.1016/S1525-0016(03)00122-9
- Köhler, R.; Tredicucci, A.; Beltram, F.; Beere, H. E.; Linfield, E. H.; Davies, A. G.; Ritchie, D. A.; Iotti, R. C.; Rossi, F. (2002). "Terahertz semiconductor-heterostructure laser." Nature. 417 (6885): 156–159. doi:10.1038/417156a
- Piazza, V., Pellegrini, V., Beltram, F.; Wegscheider, W; Jungwirth, T; MacDonald, A.H. (1999). “First-order phase transitions in a quantum Hall ferromagnet. Nature. 402: 638–641. doi:10.1038/45189
- Beltram, F.; Capasso, F; Sivco, D.L.; Hutchinson, A.L.; Chu, S.-N.G.; Cho A.Y. (1990). “Scattering-controlled transmission resonances and negative differential conductance by field-induced localization in superlattices”. Physical Review Letters. 64: 3167-3171. doi:10.1103/PhysRevLett.64.3
