= Adibelivir =

Antiherpes drug candidate

Identifiers
- IUPAC name: 2-[4-(2,5-Difluorophenyl)phenyl]-N-methyl-N-[4-methyl-5-(methylsulfonimidoyl)-1,3-thiazol-2-yl]acetamide
- CAS Number: 2305750-23-4
- PubChem CID: 138523649
- ChemSpider: 129308487
- UNII: 6ZQ8Q3CB8R
- ChEMBL: ChEMBL6014928

Chemical and physical data
- Formula: C_{20}H_{19}F_{2}N_{3}O_{2}S_{2}
- Molar mass: 435.51 g·mol^{−1}
- 3D model (JSmol): Interactive image
- SMILES: CC1=C(SC(=N1)N(C)C(=O)CC2=CC=C(C=C2)C3=C(C=CC(=C3)F)F)[S@@](=N)(=O)C
- InChI: InChI=1S/C20H19F2N3O2S2/c1-12-19(29(3,23)27)28-20(24-12)25(2)18(26)10-13-4-6-14(7-5-13)16-11-15(21)8-9-17(16)22/h4-9,11,23H,10H2,1-3H3/t29-/m0/s1; Key:JDZTWDISDHLKCR-LJAQVGFWSA-N

Adibelivir, also known as IM-250, is an anti-herpetic drug candidate developed by Innovative Molecules Gmbh. The drug was conceived by a chemist at the company, who hypothesized that swapping the sulfonamide functional group of pritelivir for a sulfoximine would reduce off-target effects. In addition, the pyridine ring on pritelivir was changed to a 2,5-difluorobenzene ring to make the drug candidate more likely to enter the central nervous system as herpes can lie dormant within neurons.

Innovative Molecules raised 20 million euro for clinical trials on humans.

== Clinical development ==
In June 2023, Innovative Molecules announced that the first subjects had been dosed in a German Phase 1 clinical trial of adibelivir.

By January 2026, the company announced completion of its Phase 1 clinical development program and advancement into Phase 2 clinical testing for recurrent genital herpes.

== Mechanism of action ==
Adibelivir is a helicase-primase inhibitor, which interferes with viral DNA replication.

== Partnerships and licensing ==
In January 2026, Innovative Molecules entered a strategic licensing agreement with Italian pharmaceutical company it for development of a parenteral formulation of adibelivir, for the treatment of HSV encephalitis.

== See also ==
- Amenamevir
