= Matthias Preusser =

Austrian oncologist

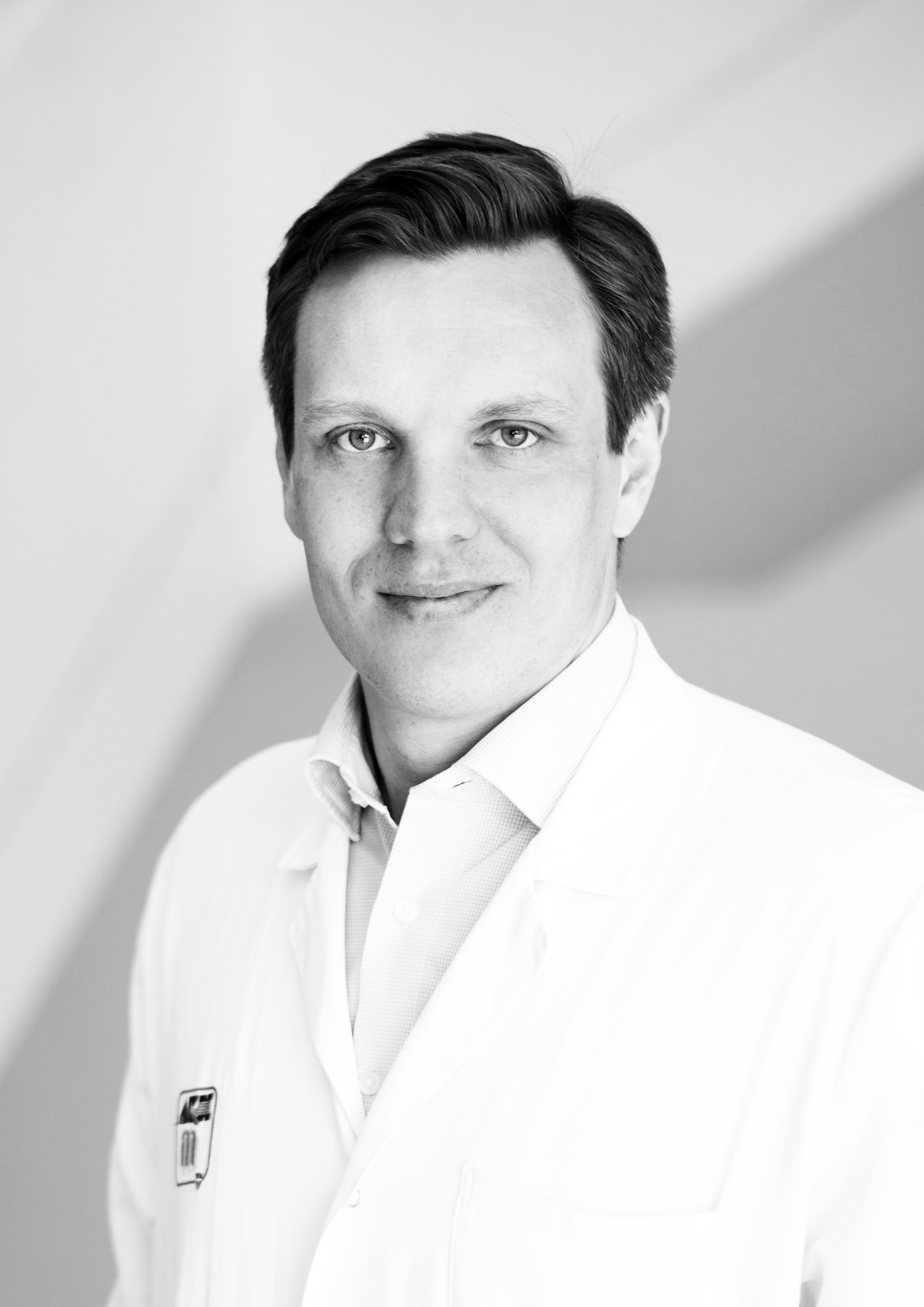
- Born: 29 October 1976 (age 49); Mödling, Austria
- Known for: neurooncology, Molecular medicine targets, biomarkers.
- Awards: Cardinal-Innitzer-Price (2009), Sibylle Assmus Price for Neuro-Oncology (2009), Advancement award of the city of Vienna (2010, 2013)
- Scientific career
- Fields: internal medicine, hematology, medical oncology
- Workplaces: Medical University of Vienna

Matthias Preusser (born 29 October 1976, Mödling) is an Austrian oncologist and Professor of Medical Oncology as well as Head of the Clinical Division of Oncology at the Medical University of Vienna. He is known for his work on neurooncology, Molecular Therapy targets and biomarkers and immunotherapy of cancer.

== Biography ==
Preusser studied medicine at the Medical University of Vienna, received his Medical Doctor (M.D.) degree in 2003 and holds specialist diplomas for internal medicine, hematology and medical oncology. He achieved habilitation in the field of Experimental Oncology 2009 with the thesis Analysis of Biomarkers in Brain Tumours and in the field of Internal Medicine 2016 with the thesis Personalized Therapy of Cancer. From 2009 he spent stays abroad at the German Cancer Research Center, Heidelberg and at the Memorial Sloan-Kettering Cancer Center, New York. On October 1, 2018 Preusser was appointed as full Professor of Medical Oncology and on November 1, 2018 as Head of the Clinical Division of Oncology at the Medical University of Vienna. He also serves as coordinator of the brain tumor unit of the Comprehensive Cancer Center – Central Nervous System (CCC-CNS).

== Scientific contributions ==
Preusser's scientific work deals with the identification of molecular changes with prognostic and therapeutic relevance in brain tumors. His investigations on the significance of the MGMT gene (O-6-methylguanine-DNA methyltransferase), the IDH gene (glioblastoma multiforme) and the BRAF gene and the immunophenotype inlcuing the role of PD-L1 in gliomas and brain metastases are highly cited and he is co-author of the current WHO brain tumor classification, which is considered an international standard reference. The oncologist leads several international clinical studies including a randomised therapy trial on high grade meningioma.

== Academic memberships ==
- European Society of Medical Oncology ESMO
- European Organisation for Research and Treatment of Cancer (EORTC)
- European Association of Neurooncology (EANO)
- Society of Austrian Neurooncology (SANO) (cofounder and first secretary)
- Österreichische Gesellschaft für Hämatologie und Medizinische Onkologie (ÖGHO)
- Central European Cooperative Oncology Group (CECOG)

== Honors and awards ==
- 2008 Medical University of Vienna Researcher of the month
- 2009 Cardinal-Innitzer-Price (advancement award)
- 2009 Sibylle Assmus Price for Neuro-Oncology, Heidelberg
- 2011 EANO Fellowship Grant
- 2010 und 2013 Advancement award of the city of Vienna

== Publications ==
Publication list PubMed
