= Joseph Glorioso =

American molecular geneticist

- Born: 1945 (age 79–80)
- Education: BSc, 1969, MSc, 1971, University of Southwestern Louisiana; PhD, Microbiology, 1974, Louisiana State University
- Scientific career
- Institutions: University of Pittsburgh School of Medicine; University of Michigan Medicine
- Thesis: Studies of Diseased Bullfrogs, Rana Catesbeiana (1974)

Joseph Charles Glorioso, III (born 1945) is an American molecular geneticist and microbiologist. He is a professor in the Department of Microbiology and Molecular Genetics at the University of Pittsburgh School of Medicine. Glorioso is a fellow of the National Academy of Inventors and the American Association for the Advancement of Science.

== Early life and education ==
Glorioso was born in 1945. He earned his Bachelor of Science and Master of Science degrees from the University of Southwestern Louisiana (now referred to as the University of Louisiana at Lafayette) and his PhD in Microbiology from Louisiana State University. His dissertation was titled "Studies of Diseased Bullfrogs, Rana Catesbeiana."

== Career ==
Upon completing his PhD, Glorioso became an assistant professor of Microbiology at the University of Michigan Medicine (UMich) in 1976. During his tenure at UMich, Glorioso specialized in Herpes simplex research and specifically focused on developing a vaccination for the viral disease. He left UMichigan in July 1989 to become a professor and chairman of the Department of Microbiology, Biochemistry and Molecular Biology at the University of Pittsburgh School of Medicine. Through his early tenure at Pitt, Glorioso began focusing on gene therapy. He helped define herpes immune responses to infection and co-developed an application of HSV gene vectors for the treatment of nervous system diseases. By 2001, Glorioso was appointed the program director of Pitts Cardiovascular Gene Therapy Center. In 2003, Glorioso was appointed the inaugural director of Pitt's Center for Muscular Dystrophy Research. He was also elected a Fellow of the American Association for the Advancement of Science.

Glorioso was recognized as a "leading pioneer in the field of cell and gene therapy" by the academic journal Human Gene Therapy in 2014. He was specifically honoured for "developing herpes viruses as efficient vectors for delivering therapeutic genes into cells." Using this expertise, Glorioso co-launched Eudora, an HSV gene therapy company targeting genetic retinal diseases, in 2022. He co-founded Eudora with colleagues Mark Blumenkranz, David Schaffer, and Vinit Mahajan. Glorioso also received the American Society for Microbiology Award for Applied and Biotechnological Research and was elected a Fellow of the National Academy of Inventors. In 2025, Glorioso was appointed the Editor-in-chief of the scientific journal Molecular Therapy.
