= Gendelman =

Gendelman is a surname. Notable people with the surname include:

- Howard E. Gendelman (born 1954), American physician
- Ofir Gendelman (born 1971), Israeli diplomat
- Zvi Gendelman (born 1956), Israeli politician
