= Fields Virology =

- Second edition
- Author: Bernard N. Fields senior founding editor (died 1995)
- Original title: Virology
- Language: English
- Subject: Virology
- Publication date: 1985 (1st edition); 2013 (6th edition); 2023 (7th edition)
- Publication place: United States
- ISBN: 1451105630

Fields Virology is an English-language virology textbook, originally it was published in two volumes and edited by Bernard N. Fields. The first edition in 1985 was called Virology, but from the second edition, the book's title was changed to Fields Virology. The book is widely regarded as an influential work on the subject and is cited as the "bible of virology" by many virologists.

Fields was the senior editor for the first three editions of the textbook. After his death in 1995, subsequent editions have retained his name in the title. The sixth edition was published in 2013 by Wolters Kluwer under the Lippincott Williams & Wilkins imprint and it was edited by David M. Knipe and Peter M. Howley.

Volume 1 (of 4) of the seventh edition was published in 2020. The fourth volume including ebook was published in June 2023.
