= David M. Knipe =

American geneticist

- Born: David Mahan Knipe; Lancaster, Ohio
- Citizenship: USA
- Education: Case Western Reserve University B.A. Massachusetts Institute of Technology Ph.D. University of Chicago Post-doctoral training
- Known for: Herpes simplex virus research Fields Virology
- Scientific career
- Fields: Virology; Microbiology
- Workplaces: Harvard Medical School

David Mahan Knipe is the Higgins Professor of Microbiology and Molecular Genetics in the Department of Microbiology at the Harvard Medical School in Boston, Massachusetts and co-chief editor of the reference book Fields Virology. He returned to the Chair of the Program in Virology at Harvard Medical School in 2019, having previously held the position from 2004 through 2016 and served as interim Co-Chair of the Microbiology and Immunobiology Department from 2016 through 2018.

== Education ==
Knipe was educated at Case Western Reserve University, receiving a B.A. summa cum laude in biology in 1972. At CWRU, he conducted research with Dr. Robert D. Goldman and showed that microfilaments in mammalian cells were actin filaments through the binding of purified heavy meromyosin to decorate the microfilaments in permeabilized cells. He continued his studies in cell biology at the Massachusetts Institute of Technology, earning his Ph.D. in 1976; his thesis research focused on vesicular stomatitis virus (VSV) under the supervision of Dr. David Baltimore and Dr. Harvey Lodish. Knipe first separated and translated the VSV mRNAs in vitro to identify their coding potential. He then showed that the VSV glycoprotein (G) and membrane (M) proteins are assembled into virions by two separate pathways. The pathway for G protein helped defined the secretory pathway for membrane glycoprotein assembly and the pathway for the M protein defined a cytosolic pathway for membrane protein assembly.

Following the completion of his graduate studies, he trained as post-doctoral fellow on molecular genetics of herpes simplex virus (HSV) at the University of Chicago with Dr. Bernard Roizman. Knipe developed a cotransfection method for marker rescue mapping of mutations and introduction of new sequences into the HSV genome and showed that the ICP4 gene mapped in the repeated sequences of the short component of the viral genome. This methodology was used to map viral glycoproteins, plaque morphology, and drug resistance markers, and to construct a genital herpes vaccine candidate.

== Research ==
In 1979, Knipe joined the faculty at Harvard Medical School as an assistant professor of Microbiology and Molecular Genetics and established his own lab to study HSV. He showed that HSV replicates its DNA in defined compartments in the infected cell nucleus. They further showed that the viral genome associated with the nuclear lamina for immediate-early transcription. This work revealed that intranuclear proteins are localized to specific sites to carry out their functions, much as cytoplasmic proteins were known to localize to specific sites. This led to new areas of study of intranuclear compartmentalization of DNA virus replication. Knipe's research has shown that host cell DNA repair and recombination proteins are localized to the viral replication compartments and that some of these inhibit viral replication while some are essential for viral replication. He discovered the molecular basis of herpes simplex virus lytic and latent infection through the definition of epigenetic regulatory mechanisms in which: viral proteins promote euchromatin modifications on viral chromatin and transcription of lytic genes in epithelial cells; and the viral latency-associated transcript promotes heterochromatin modifications on viral chromatin and silencing of lytic genes in neurons. He defined the structure of viral chromatin during latent infection of neurons and the mechanisms by which viral DNA is kept silenced during latent infection. He has also defined the cellular proteins that recognize herpesviral DNA in the nucleus and initiate innate signaling and restrict viral gene expression and identified viral proteins that block host innate responses. His work has shown that replication-defective viruses can serve as a genital herpes vaccine and as a vaccine vector—one of these genital herpes vaccines, HSV-529, is the leading candidate in phase I clinical trials.

== Awards and honors ==
Knipe has received several honors and awards including:

- National Science Foundation pre-doctoral fellowship (1972–1975)
- Jane Coffin Childs Postdoctoral Fellowship (1976–1978)
- Leukemia Society of America (now Leukemia & Lymphoma Society) Special Fellowship (1978–1980)
- Cancer Research Scholar of American Cancer Society, Massachusetts Division (1978–1980)
- Faculty Research Award, American Cancer Society (1984–1989)
- MERIT (Method to Extend Research in Time) Award, National Cancer Institute (1988–1996)
- Election to Fellowship in the American Academy for Microbiology (2009)
- S. Edward Sulkin Visiting Professor, University of Texas Southwestern Medical Center (2013)
- Harvard Medical School, Division of Medical Sciences Distinguished Faculty Award (2017)
- Member of the U. S. National Academy of Sciences (2021)

== Personal life ==
Knipe is married to Suzanne Knipe; they have two daughters and four grandchildren.
