= Bernard N. Fields =

American physician

Bernard Nathan Fields (March 24, 1938 in Brooklyn, New York – January 31, 1995, West Newton, Massachusetts) was an American microbiologist and virologist. Fields was a member of the National Academy of Sciences.

Fields was the Adele Lehman Professor and chairman of the department of microbiology and molecular genetics of Harvard Medical School, and he was the head of division of infectious diseases at the Brigham and Women's Hospital in Boston. Prior to that, he was on the faculty at the Albert Einstein College of Medicine. He was the editor-in-chief of the journal Virology.

He was the founding senior editor of a textbook first published in 1985 as Virology, that then was renamed eponymously for him as Fields Virology. Its sixth edition was published in 2013. The seventh edition is planned to include four volumes, with volume 1 published in 2020.

While memorializing Field in 1995, Harold Varmus, director of the National Institutes of Health, called Fields "the intellectual leader of the field for more than the last decade". In his obituary, The New York Times said that Fields "is credited with spearheading the current resurgence of research on how viruses cause damage". The National Academies Press called him "a recognized leader in the field of viral pathogenesis" and said Fields will "be remembered for emphasizing the importance of basic research in the area of clinical medicine and in helping to define molecular parameters that affect disease".

Fields died of pancreatic cancer at the age of 56.

== Awards and distinctions ==
- 1962 Founders' Day Award, New York University School of Medicine
- 1974–1979 Irma T. Hirschl Scholar Award
- 1974 Twelfth Annual Redway Medal (with Cedric Raine)
- 1974–1975 Career Scientist, Health Research Council of New York
- 1982 Solomon A. Berson Alumni Achievement Award, New York University School of Medicine
- 1982 Wellcome Lecturer, American Society of Microbiology
- 1983 Lippard Lecturer, Columbia University
- 1984 Thayer Lecturer, The Johns Hopkins University School of Medicine
- 1987 Dyer Lecturer, National Institutes of Health
- 1987–1995 Merit Award, National Institute of Allergy and Infectious Diseases
- 1989 Niels Dungal Memorial Lecturer, University of Iceland, Reykjavik
- 1991 Dudley Wright Lecturer, Arolla, Switzerland
- 1992 Alumni Achievement Award, Brandeis University

== Career ==
Fields received his A.B. degree at Brandeis University. He received his M.D. degree in 1962 from New York University School of Medicine.

- 1965–1966 medical virologist, virology section – National Communicable Disease Center, Atlanta, Georgia
- 1966–1967 assistant chief, arbovirus infectious unit – National Communicable Disease Center, Atlanta, Georgia
- 1967–1968 postdoctoral fellow, department of cell biology – Albert Einstein College of Medicine
- 1968–1969 associate, departments of medicine and cell biology – Albert Einstein College of Medicine
- 1969–1971 assistant professor, departments of medicine and cell biology – Albert Einstein College of Medicine
- 1971–1975 associate professor, departments of medicine and cell biology – Albert Einstein College of Medicine
- 1975–1994 professor of microbiology and molecular genetics – Harvard Medical School
- 1981–1994 professor of medicine – Harvard Medical School
- 1982–1994 chairman, department of microbiology and molecular genetics – Harvard Medical School
- 1984–1994 Adele H. Lehman Professor of Microbiology and Molecular Genetics – Harvard Medical School
- 1976–1994 associate editor – Journal of Infectious Diseases
- 1977–1977 visiting professor – Washington University in St. Louis, Missouri.
