= Amenamevir =

Chemical compound

Clinical data
- Trade names: Amenalief
- Other names: ASP-2151, ASP2151
- ATC code: J05AX26 (WHO)

Legal status
- Legal status: In general: ℞ (Prescription only)

Identifiers
- IUPAC name: N-(2,6-Dimethylphenyl)-N-[2-[4-(1,2,4-oxadiazol-3-yl)anilino]-2-oxoethyl]-1,1-dioxothiane-4-carboxamide
- CAS Number: 841301-32-4
- PubChem CID: 11397521
- DrugBank: 11701
- ChemSpider: 9572421
- UNII: 94X46KW4AE
- KEGG: D10564
- CompTox Dashboard (EPA): DTXSID101027753

Chemical and physical data
- Formula: C_{24}H_{26}N_{4}O_{5}S
- Molar mass: 482.56 g·mol^{−1}
- 3D model (JSmol): Interactive image
- SMILES: Cc1cccc(C)c1N(CC(=O)Nc1ccc(-c2ncon2)cc1)C(=O)C1CCS(=O)(=O)CC1
- InChI: InChI=1S/C24H26N4O5S/c1-16-4-3-5-17(2)22(16)28(24(30)19-10-12-34(31,32)13-11-19)14-21(29)26-20-8-6-18(7-9-20)23-25-15-33-27-23/h3-9,15,19H,10-14H2,1-2H3,(H,26,29); Key:MNHNIVNAFBSLLX-UHFFFAOYSA-N

Amenamevir (trade name Amenalief) is an antiviral drug used for the treatment of shingles (herpes zoster).

It acts as an inhibitor of the zoster virus's helicase–primase complex. Amenamevir was approved in Japan for the treatment of shingles in 2017.

== See also ==
- Pritelivir
