= Journal of Neuroimmune Pharmacology =

- Discipline: Neuroscience
- Language: English

Publication details
- History: 2006–present
- Publisher: Springer Science+Business Media
- Frequency: Quarterly
- Impact factor: 6.2 (2022)

Standard abbreviations
- ISO 4: J. Neuroimmune Pharmacol.

Indexing
- ISSN: 1557-1890 (print); 1557-1904 (web)
- LCCN: 2005215692
- OCLC no.: 830935768

Links
- Journal homepage; Online archive

The Journal of Neuroimmune Pharmacology is a quarterly peer-reviewed scientific journal covering research on the intersection of immunology, pharmacology, and neuroscience as they relate to each other. The journal occasionally publishes special thematic issues. It was established in 2006 and is published by Springer Science+Business Media.

== Abstracting and indexing ==
The journal is abstracted and indexed in:

- Academic OneFile
- AGRICOLA
- Biological Abstracts
- BIOSIS Previews
- EMBASE
- PubMed/MEDLINE
- Science Citation Index Expanded
- Scopus

According to the Journal Citation Reports, the journal has a 2021 impact factor of 7.285.
