= Howard E. Gendelman =

Scientist, HIV researcher, Parkinson's researcher

Howard E. Gendelman, M.D.
- Born: March 18, 1954 (age 72); Philadelphia, Pennsylvania, U.S.
- Education: Muhlenberg College (B.S.); Pennsylvania State University College of Medicine (M.D.)
- Known for: HIV research, Parkinson's research, neuroimmune-pharmacology
- Awards: Startup of the Year 2022 UNeMed; Nebraska Coalition for Lifesaving Cures' 2022 Life Saver Award; 2018 Jewish Federation of Omaha Humanitarian of the Year Award; 2017 Society on NeuroImmune Pharmacology Lifetime Achievement Award; International Society for NeuroVirology's 2016 Pioneer in NeuroVirology; 2000 J. William Fulbright Research Scholar; and others
- Scientific career
- Fields: Virology, neuroimmunology, neuroscience, pharmacology, therapeutics
- Workplaces: Current: University of Nebraska Medical Center; Previous: Henry M. Jackson Foundation for the Advancement in Military Medicine; Walter Reed Army Institute of Research; Uniformed Services University of the Health Sciences Center; Johns Hopkins University; Albert Einstein College of Medicine
- Website: https://www.unmc.edu/pharmacology/faculty/primary-faculty/gendelman/

Howard E. Gendelman (born March 18, 1954) is an American physician-scientist whose research intersects the disciplines of neuroimmunology, pharmacology, and infectious diseases. Gendelman was born in Philadelphia, Pennsylvania. His research is focused on harnessing immune responses for therapeutic gain in HIV/AIDS and Neurodegenerative disease. He is the Margaret R. Larson Professor of infectious diseases and internal medicine at the University of Nebraska Medical Center (UNMC) in Omaha.

He is married with three children and seven grandchildren.

== Early life and education ==
Gendelman was born in Philadelphia to a Jewish family, on March 18, 1954. He attended Muhlenberg College in Allentown, Pennsylvania, where he graduated Cum Laude with a bachelor's degree in Natural Sciences and Russian Studies in 1975. He completed his doctorate of medicine at the Pennsylvania State University-Hershey Medical Center in 1979. In 1999, he was honored as a Distinguished Alumnus. He completed a residency in Internal medicine at Montefiore Hospital, Albert Einstein College of Medicine in 1982, and he was a Clinical and Research Fellow in Neurology and Infectious Diseases at the Johns Hopkins Hospital in Baltimore from 1982 to 1985.

== Career ==
Gendelman worked at the National Institute of Allergy and Infectious Diseases during the height of the HIV/AIDS pandemic. In 1986 he collaborated with Dr. Anthony S. Fauci and colleagues on a groundbreaking study published in Science titled, "Detection of AIDS Virus in Macrophages in Brain Tissue from AIDS Patients with Encephalopathy”, which fundamentally changed the understanding of how HIV causes neurological damage and dementia.

Gendelman also occupied senior faculty and research positions at the Johns Hopkins Medical Institutions, the Uniformed Services University of the Health Sciences Center, the Walter Reed Army Institute of Research, and the Henry M. Jackson Foundation for the Advancement in Military Medicine before joining the faculty of UNMC in March 1993. He retired from the US Army with the rank of Lieutenant Colonel. He established the Center for Neurovirology and Neurodegenerative Disorders at UNMC in 1997, which evolved into UNMC's current Department of Pharmacology and Experimental Neuroscience in 2004. In 2000, he was awarded a Fulbright to do research at the Weizmann Institute of Science in Rehovot, Israel In 2023 he was awarded the University of Nebraska's inaugural Faculty IP Innovation and Commercialization Award celebrating his broad number of research discoveries.

=== Innate and Adaptive Immunity for neurodegenerative disease ===
Gendelman's contributions to studies of innate immunity in infectious and degenerative diseases have been published in more than 248 manuscripts. His research explores the role of mononuclear phagocytes (monocytes, macrophages, microglia, and dendritic cells) as viral reservoirs, perpetrators of disease, and depots for nanoformulated drug delivery. His work was foundational to building a field of investigation focused on lentiviral pathogenesis, diagnostics, and therapeutics. These advancements in immune transformation have led to new and effective management of neurodegenerative disease progression. Gendelman and his research team were among the first to develop laboratory assays for establishing viral tropism for mononuclear phagocytes, and they were the first to demonstrate that infected and immune activated mononuclear phagocytes release viral and cellular toxins that damage the nervous system. His studies with humanized mouse models of HIV/AIDS giving insight into the human immune system and neurodegenerative disorders have been represented in more than 93 publications.

=== HIV research contributions ===
Gendelman's group was among the first to reverse HIV-dementia in an infected person using combination antiretroviral therapy (cART), and they developed scores of rodent models to mimic HIV/AIDS end-organ disease. He coined the term long-acting slow effective release ART (LASER ART). These works led to polymer discovery, targeted drug delivery to viral reservoirs, and reduction of residual virus in lymphoid organs. His Nebraska-based research group, along with a team at Temple University, was also the first to combine HIV reservoir-targeted LASER ART and CRISPR-Cas9 to eliminate chronic viral infection from infected animals. This curative approach (published in Nature Communications, 2019) received considerable attention in establishing a novel translational pathway for HIV eradication. This work followed the first ultra-long acting nanocrystal prodrug and the world's first HIV vaccine mimetic (in Nature Materials, 2020). His work with cell-based drug delivery born out of nanoparticle-mononuclear phagocyte interactions has inspired broad pharmaceutical interest; in turn, Gendelman led the establishment of the Nebraska Nanomedicine Production Plant, a biotechnology good manufacturing practices (cGMP) initiative, to position research for clinical translation in the development of long acting nanoformulated ART at UNMC. He also co-founded Exavir Therapeutics, Inc., a biotechnology company developing therapies towards and cure for HIV/AIDS.

=== Alzheimer's and Parkinson's Disease research contributions ===
Gendelman was the first to pharmacologically transform effector into regulatory T cells to halt the progression of Parkinson's disease. He initiated studies of regulatory T cell-(Treg) based therapies for neurodegenerative diseases. He introduced the concept that adaptive immunity influences the pathobiology of neurodegenerative disorders and that misfolded aggregated self-proteins can break immune tolerance leading to the induction of autoreactive effector T cells. He developed the idea that anti-inflammatory and neuroprotective Tregs can restore a disordered immunity in neurodegenerative diseases. He is one of the most prolific authors in this area.

=== Scientific community leadership ===
Gendelman has written or edited 17 books and monographs (including multiple editions of the textbooks The Neurology of AIDS and Neuroimmune Pharmacology). He was the founding Editor-in-Chief of the Journal of Neuroimmune Pharmacology and the current Editor-in-Chief of Neuroimmune Pharmacology and Therapeutics. He served as the president of the Society of Neuroimmune Pharmacology from 2024 to 2025.

== Awards and honors ==
=== Research recognitions ===
- Startup of the Year 2022 - Exavir Therapeutics
- Nebraska Coalition for Lifesaving Cures' 2022 Life Saver Award
- Lifetime Achievement Award, Contribution to the Advancement of the Mission of the Society on NeuroImmune Pharmacology, 2017
- Pioneer in NeuroVirology, International Society for NeuroVirology, 2016
- Javits Investigator Award, National Institutes of Health, 2000
- Co-Founder of Neural Regen
- Scientific Lead, Translational Discover, NeuralRegen
- 2025 Avis Professorship, The University fo Tennessee Health Sciences Center
- University of Nebraska’s inaugural Faculty IP Innovation and Commercialization Award (FIPICA)
