= Meromyosin =

Products of trypsin proteolysis of myosin

Meromyosin is a part of myosin (mero meaning "part of"). With regards to human anatomy myosin and actin constitute the basic functional unit of a muscle fiber, called sarcomere, playing a role in muscle contraction.

Biochemically viewed meromyosin form subunits of the actin-associated motor protein, myosin, as commonly obtained by trypsin proteolysis (protein breakdown). Following this proteolysis, two types of meromyosin are formed: heavy meromyosin (HMM) and light meromyosin (LMM).

Light meromyosin has a long, straight portion in the “tail” region. Heavy meromyosin (HMM) is a protein chain terminating in a globular head portion/cross bridge. HMM consists of two subunits, Heavy Meromyosin Subunit 1 and 2 (HMMS-1 and HMMS-2). The majority of myosin activity is concentrated in HMMS-1. HMMS-1 has an actin binding site and ATP binding site (myosin ATPase) that determines the rate of muscle contraction when muscle is stretched.

Light and heavy meromyosin are subunits of myosin filaments (thick myofilaments).
