= Helicase–primase complex =

A helicase–primase complex (also helicase-primase, Hel/Prim, H-P or H/P) is a complex of enzymes including DNA helicase and DNA primase. A helicase-primase associated factor protein may also be present.

The complex is used by herpesviruses, in which it is responsible for lytic DNA virus replication. In many dsDNA viruses, primase and helicase are fused into a single polypeptide chain, so that the primase and helicase domains correspond to the N-terminal and C-terminal parts of the protein, respectively. A helicase-primase inhibitor (HPI) is a drug that blocks this action through acting as an enzyme inhibitor.

== List of H-P by virus name ==
- EBV: helicase:BBLF4 primase: BSLF1 accessory protein:BBLF2/3

== List of H-P inhibitors ==
- Amenamevir (ASP2151)
- Pritelivir (BAY 57–1293, AIC316)
- BILS 22 BS
- T157602
- Adbelivir (IM-250)
