= Ectoplasmic specialisation =

Ectoplasmic specializations are actin-related cell–cell junctions present in the testicular seminiferous epithelium and occur during spermatogenesis. These junctions are located at the Sertoli–Sertoli cell interface and Sertoli-elongating spermatid interface, which occur during the seminiferous epithelial cycle of spermatogenesis. There must be vast reconstructing of the anchoring junctions such as the ectoplasmic specializations within the testes. The reconstruction of these junctions is important because it facilitates the migration of the developing germ cells across the seminiferous epithelium
