= Heavy meromyosin =

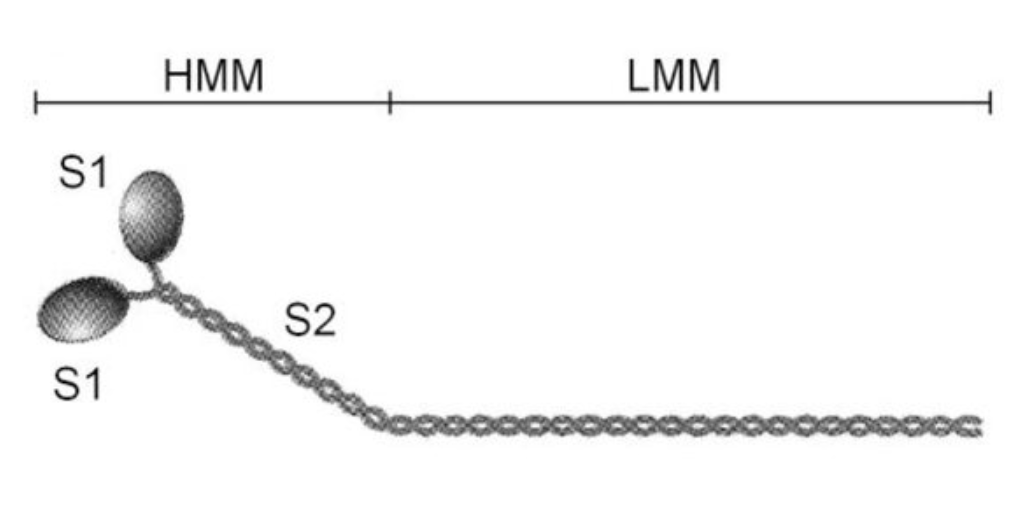
Schematic diagram of a myosin II molecule showing Heavy Meromyosin, composed of the S2 region and two globular heads (S1) containing the actin-binding site and myosin light chains, essential for force generation

Heavy meromyosin (HMM) is the larger of the two fragments obtained from the muscle protein myosin II following limited proteolysis by trypsin or chymotrypsin. The Heavy Meromyosin fragment holds a critical function, as it is responsible for regulation ATPase enzymatic activity and mediating the binding interaction with actin filaments.HMM contains two domains S-1 and S-2, which can be cleaved apart by papain. S-1 contains the globular head that can bind to actin, while the S-2 domain projects at an angle from light meromyosin (LMM), connecting the two meromyosin fragments.

== ATPase regulation ==
Heavy meromyosin increase drastically its activity when it attaches to actin filaments fil. It's ATPase activity can intensify several times because the S1 heads hydrolyze adenosine triphosphate (ATP) in a cycle where binding the acting speeds up phosphate release and force generation. In some organism, calcium ions (Ca²^{+}) bind directly to HMM and increase the maximum rate (V_{max}) of ATPase catalytic activity. This happens because calcium changes the steps that occur after binding, not just the affinity between molecules. When calcium levels are low, some steps of ATP hydrolysis become slower.

== Applications ==
HMM is used to determine the polarity of actin filaments by decorating them with HMM then viewing them under the electron microscope.
