= Molecular Therapy =

- Discipline: Genetic diseases
- Language: English
- Edited by: Joseph Glorioso

Publication details
- History: 2000–present
- Publisher: Cell Press
- Frequency: Monthly
- Impact factor: 11.4 (2025)

Standard abbreviations
- ISO 4: Mol. Ther.

Indexing
- ISSN: 1525-0016 (print); 1525-0024 (web)
- OCLC no.: 41354718

Links
- Journal homepage

Molecular Therapy is a scientific journal, published by Cell Press, that aims to develop and explore "molecular and cellular therapeutics to correct genetic and acquired diseases".

The founder of the journal and its Editor-in-Chief in the first five years was Inder Verma.
