= Pritelivir =

Anti-viral medication

Clinical data
- Pronunciation: hoe-vil-pree
- Trade names: Hovilpri
- Other names: AIC-316, BAY 57-1293
- AHFS/Drugs.com: Hovilpri
- Routes of administration: By mouth
- ATC code: None

Legal status
- Legal status: US: ℞-only

Identifiers
- IUPAC name: N-Methyl-N-(4-methyl-5-sulfamoyl-1,3-thiazol-2-yl)-2-[4-(pyridin-2-yl)phenyl]acetamide
- CAS Number: 348086-71-5; 1428321-10-1
- PubChem CID: 491941
- DrugBank: DB11844
- ChemSpider: 430613
- UNII: 07HQ1TJ4JE; 7EX4CZ4HYG
- KEGG: D12811; D12812
- ChEBI: CHEBI:756751; CHEBI:757716
- ChEMBL: ChEMBL4069597; ChEMBL4562772
- CompTox Dashboard (EPA): DTXSID70188344

Chemical and physical data
- Formula: C_{18}H_{18}N_{4}O_{3}S_{2}
- Molar mass: 402.49 g·mol^{−1}
- 3D model (JSmol): Interactive image
- SMILES: CN(C(=O)CC1=CC=C(C=C1)C2=CC=CC=N2)C3=NC(C)=C(S3)S(N)(=O)=O
- InChI: InChI=1S/C18H18N4O3S2/c1-12-17(27(19,24)25)26-18(21-12)22(2)16(23)11-13-6-8-14(9-7-13)15-5-3-4-10-20-15/h3-10H,11H2,1-2H3,(H2,19,24,25); Key:IVZKZONQVYTCKC-UHFFFAOYSA-N; InChI=1/C18H18N4O3S2/c1-12-17(27(19,24)25)26-18(21-12)22(2)16(23)11-13-6-8-14(9-7-13)15-5-3-4-10-20-15/h3-10H,11H2,1-2H3,(H2,19,24,25); Key:IVZKZONQVYTCKC-UHFFFAOYAL

Pritelivir, sold under the brand name Hovilpri, is an antiviral medication used for the treatment of herpes simplex virus infections. It is a herpes simplex virus helicase-primase inhibitor. It is used in the salt form pritelivir mesylate monohydrate. It is taken by mouth.

The most common adverse reactions include headache.

Pritelivir was approved for medical use in the United States in October 2026.

== Medical use ==
Pritelivir is indicated in immunocompromised adults for the treatment of mucocutaneous lesions caused by herpes simplex virus infection that is refractory (with or without documented resistance) to treatment with acyclovir, valacyclovir, or famciclovir.

== Adverse effects ==
The most common adverse reactions include headache.

== Pharmacology ==
=== Mechanism of action ===
Pritelivir is an antiviral medication against herpes simplex virus 1 (HSV-1) and herpes simplex virus 2 (HSV-2).

Pritelivir is a member of the helicase-primase inhibitors, a novel class of direct-acting antiviral medications acting specifically against HSV-1 and HSV-2. The medication acts through inhibition of the viral helicase primase complex, encoded by the UL5 (helicase), UL8 (scaffold protein) and UL52 (primase) genes, which is essential for HSV replication.

== History ==
The efficacy of pritelivir was evaluated in a randomized, open-label, comparator-controlled, superiority trial (PRIOH-1 Phase III Trial, Part C; NCT03073967) in immunocompromised participants with mucocutaneous herpes simplex virus infection who did not respond to treatment with acyclovir, valacyclovir, or famciclovir. Participants received pritelivir or the trial investigator's choice of available treatments for up to 28 days until all mucocutaneous lesions healed, which was extended up to 42 days if lesions were improving but not completely healed after 28 days. A total of 101 immunocompromised adults were randomly assigned and treated with pritelivir or the investigator's choice of available treatments. Participants had a wide range of immunosuppressive clinical conditions, including one or more of the following: hematologic malignancy/disorder, hematopoietic stem-cell transplantation, HIV infection, autoimmune/inflammatory diseases, non-hematologic malignancies, or solid-organ transplantation.

== Society and culture ==
=== Legal status ===
Pritelivir was approved for medical use in the United States in October 2026. The US Food and Drug Administration granted the application for pritelivir priority review designation.

=== Names ===
Pritelivir is the international nonproprietary name.

Pritelivir is sold under the brand name Hovilpri.
