= Lisa Gunaydin =

American neuroscientist

- Education: B.A. Swarthmore College, Ph.D. Stanford University
- Known for: Optogenetics
- Awards: 2017 Chan Zuckerberg Biohub Investigator Program Investigator, 2016 UCSF Weill Institute for Neurosciences Innovation Award, 2008 Bio-X Bowes Fellow Stanford
- Scientific career
- Fields: Neuroscience
- Workplaces: Weill Institute for Neurosciences, University of California, San Francisco

Lisa Gunaydin is an American neuroscientist and assistant professor at the Weill Institute for Neurosciences at the University of California San Francisco. Gunaydin helped discover optogenetics in the lab of Karl Deisseroth and now uses this technique in combination with neural and behavioral recordings to probe the neural circuits underlying emotional behaviors.

== Early life and education ==
Gunaydin completed her undergraduate education at Swarthmore College with a degree in biological sciences. Gunaydin then continued on an academic path by pursuing a Ph.D. at Stanford University. Under the mentorship of Dr. Karl Deisseroth, Gunaydin helped to discover optogenetic technology and apply it to Systems Neuroscience by dissecting neural circuits that drive a variety of complex behaviors in rodents. Optogenetics is a tool used in Systems Neuroscience to activate or inhibit specific neural circuits using transgenically expressed light-activated opsins, originally derived from bacterial opsins. Shining lasers of specific wavelengths causes the channels to open. In the case of Channelrhodopsins, cations ions flow into the neuron to depolarize it, while in the case of Halorhodopsins, anions flow into the neuron to hyperpolarize it. This can effectively allow a scientist to activate or inhibit specific neurons or neural circuits in an organism expressing the transgenic protein.

In 2008, Gunaydin was named the Bio-X Bowes Fellow at Stanford for her work developing new optogenetic technologies and applying them to probe dopaminergic circuitry implicated in social behaviors. In 2009, Gunaydin co-first authored a paper in Nature Neuroscience where she helped to test and optimize step-function opsins which allow longer lasting membrane depolarization than regular opsins providing extended effects on neural circuits. In 2010, Gunaydin published a first author paper in Nature Neuroscience highlighting her optimization of a new opsin based tool for ultrafast neural circuit control. In this work Gunaydin showed that this novel opsin does not produce unwanted spikes nor persistent depolarizations like what might occur when a cell over-expresses Channelrhodopsin. In 2015, Gunaydin and her colleagues in the Deisseroth Lab published a paper in the journal Cell, where they used fiber photometry to observe calcium dynamics in dopaminergic neural circuits involved in social behavior. She and her colleagues also found that the neural projection from the Ventral Tegmental Area (VTA) to the Nucleus Accumbens (NAc) encodes and predicts social behaviors. Using optogenetics, Gunaydin probed the causal effects of stimulating the dopaminergic projection from the VTA to the NAc and found that modulation of this projection bi-directionally affected social behaviors. Gunaydin went on to present this work at the Cold Spring Harbour Symposia on Quantitative Biology. This was one of the first studies ever to manipulate social neural circuits in real time, using optogenetics, and observe changes in social behavior. After her PhD, Gunaydin pursued her postdoctoral work with Dr. Anatol Kreitzer at the University of California San Francisco's Gladstone Institute of Neurological Disease. Under Kreitzer's mentorship, Gunaydin brought her experience and expertise with optogenetics to explore fronto-striatal circuitry and its implications in anxiety-like behavior.

== Career and research ==
Gunaydin started her lab at the University of California, San Francisco in 2016 and has since held an assistant professorship in Psychiatry as well as an appointment at the Institute for Neurodegenerative Diseases. In addition, Gunaydin is a member of the UCSF Neuroscience Graduate Program, the Kavli Institute for Fundamental Neuroscience, and in 2017 was named a Chan Zuckerberg Biohub Investigator. Gunaydin's lab aims to investigate the neural circuits underlying motivated behaviors and further understand how they aberrantly function in disease states. Gunaydin's lab is currently focusing on three main projects to address this aim. The first project involves probing the role of cortico-striatal circuitry in modulating anxiety-like behavior as well as elucidating the potential of this circuit as a target of chronic therapeutic stimulation. In line with this project, the Gunaydin Lab published their first paper in 2020 highlighting their discovery of a subpopulation of striatal projecting prefrontal neurons that regulate approach-avoidance conflict in rodents. The other two projects her lab is working on explore the roles of cortical neural subpopulations in obsessive-compulsive disorder behaviors as well as the mechanisms of circuit defects in genetic mouse models for obsessive-compulsive disorder and autism.

== Awards and honors ==
- 2017 Chan Zuckerberg Biohub Investigator Program Investigator
- 2016 UCSF Weill Institute for Neurosciences Innovation Award
- 2008 Bio-X Bowes Fellow Stanford

== Select publications ==
- Loewke AC, Minerva AR, Nelson AB, Kreitzer AC, Gunaydin LA (2020). Fronto-striatal projections regulate approach-avoidance conflict. bioRxiv.
- Gunaydin LA, Kreitzer AC (2016). Cortico-basal ganglia circuit function in psychiatric disease. Annual Review of Physiology 78: 327–350.
- Adhikari A, Lerner TN, Finkelstein J, Pak S, Jennings JH, Davidson TJ, Ferenczi E, Gunaydin LA, Mirzabekov JJ, Ye L, Kim SY, Lei A, Deisseroth K (2015). Basomedial amygdala mediates top-down control of anxiety and fear. Nature 527: 179–185.
- Gunaydin LA, Deisseroth K (2015). Dopaminergic Dynamics Contributing to Social Behavior. In Cold Spring Harbor Symposia on Quantitative Biology 221–227. Cold Spring Harbor, NY: Cold Spring Harbor Laboratory Press.
- Fenno LE, Gunaydin LA, Deisseroth K (2015). Mapping Anatomy to Behavior in Thy1:18 ChR2-YFP Transgenic Mice Using Optogenetics. In Molecular Neuroscience: A Laboratory Manual 594–606. Cold Spring Harbor, NY: Cold Spring Harbor Laboratory Press.
- Gunaydin LA, Grosenick L, Finkelstein JC, Kauvar I, Fenno LE, Adhikari A, Lammel S, Mirzabekov J, Airan RD, Zalocusky KA, Tye KM, Anikeeva P, Malenka R, Deisseroth K (2014). Natural neural projection dynamics underlying social behavior. Cell 157(7): 1535–51.
- Tye KM, Mirzabekov JJ, Warden MR, Ferenczi EA, Tsai HC, Finkelstein J, Kim SY, Adhikari A, Thompson KR, Andalman AS, Gunaydin LA, Witten IB, Deisseroth K (2012). Dopamine neurons modulate neural encoding and expression of depression-related behavior. Nature 493(7433):537-41.
- Mattis J, Tye KM, Ferenczi EA, Ramakrishnan C, O'Shea DJ, Prakash R, Gunaydin LA, Hyun M, Fenno LE, Gradinaru V, Yizhar O, Deisseroth K (2011). Principles for applying optogenetic tools derived from direct comparative analysis of microbial opsins. Nature Methods 9(2):159-72.
- Anikeeva P, Andalman AS, Witten IB, Warden MR, Goshen I, Grosenick L, Gunaydin LA, Frank L, Deisseroth K. (2011). Optetrode: a multichannel readout for optogenetic control in freely moving mice. Nature Neuroscience 15(1):163-70.
- Gunaydin LA*, Yizhar O*, Berndt A*, Sohal VS, Deisseroth K, Hegemann P (2010). Ultrafast optogenetic control. Nature Neuroscience 13(3):387-92.
- Berndt A*, Yizhar O*, Gunaydin LA*, Hegemann P, and Deisseroth K. Bi-stable neural state switches (2009). Nature Neuroscience 12(2):229-34. *co-first authors
- Westberg L, Sawa E, Wang AY, Gunaydin LA, Ribeiro AC, Pfaff DW (2009). Colocalization of connexin 36 and corticotropin-releasing hormone in the mouse brain. BMC Neuroscience 10:41.
