= Anion-conducting channelrhodopsin =

Class of light-gated ion channels

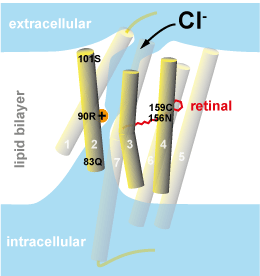
Figure 1: It took 5 point mutations to create iChloC from cation-conducting Channelrhodopsin-2.

Anion-conducting channelrhodopsins are light-gated ion channels that open in response to light and let negatively charged ions (such as chloride) enter a cell. All channelrhodopsins use retinal as light-sensitive pigment, but they differ in their ion selectivity. Anion-conducting channelrhodopsins are used as tools to manipulate brain activity in mice, fruit flies and other model organisms (Optogenetics). Neurons expressing anion-conducting channelrhodopsins are silenced when illuminated with light, an effect that has been used to investigate information processing in the brain. For example, suppressing dendritic calcium spikes in specific neurons with light reduced the ability of mice to perceive a light touch to a whisker. Studying how the behavior of an animal changes when specific neurons are silenced allows scientists to determine the role of these neurons in the complex circuits controlling behavior.

The first anion-conducting channelrhodopsins were engineered from the cation-conducting light-gated channel Channelrhodopsin-2 by removing negatively charged amino acids from the channel pore (Fig. 1). As the main anion of extracellular fluid is chloride (Cl^{−}), anion-conducting channelrhodopsins are also known as "chloride-conducting channelrhodopsins" (ChloCs). Naturally occurring anion-conducting channelrhodopsins (ACRs) were subsequently identified in cryptophyte algae. The crystal structure of the natural GtACR1 has recently been solved, paving the way for further protein engineering.

Structure of bromide-bound GtACR1 (PDB: 7LE1). The two gray planes indicate the hydrocarbon boundaries of the lipid bilayer and were calculated with the ANVIL algorithm.

== Variants ==
name	species of origin	absorption	reference	properties, applications
slowChloC	Chlamydomonas reinhardtii	blue	Wietek et al. 2014	first generation, mixed conductance
iC1C2	Chlamydomonas reinhardtii	blue	Berndt et al. 2014	first generation, mixed conductance
iChloC	Chlamydomonas reinhardtii	blue	Wietek et al. 2015	inhibition of perception in mice
iC++	Chlamydomonas reinhardtii	blue	Berndt et al. 2016	inhibition of sleep in mice
GtACR1	Guillardia theta	green	Govorunova et al. 2015	inhibition of behavior in Drosophila inhibition of rat heart muscle cells holographic spike suppression in mouse cortex
GtACR1(C102A)	Guillardia theta	green on red off	Govorunova et al. 2018	bistable
GtACR1(R83Q/N239Q) FLASH	Guillardia theta	green on	Kato et al. 2018	very fast closing, large currents inhibition of swimming in C. elegans, inhibition of spiking in mouse
GtACR2	Guillardia theta	blue	Govorunova et al. 2015	inhibition of behavior in Drosophila inhibition of fear extinction in mice
PsACR1	Proteomonas sulcata	green	Wietek et al. 2016, Govorunova et al. 2016	large currents
ZipACR	Proteomonas sulcata	green	Govorunova et al. 2017	very fast
RapACR	Rhodomonas salina	green	Govorunova et al. 2018	very fast, large currents
SwiChR++	Chlamydomonas reinhardtii	blue on red off	Berndt et al. 2016	bistable
Phobos CA	Chlamydomonas reinhardtii	blue on red off	Wietek et al. 2017	bistable
Aurora	Chlamydomonas reinhardtii	orange-red	Wietek et al. 2017	stop locomotion of Drosophila larvae
MerMAIDs	unknown	green	Oppermann et al. 2019	rapidly inactivating

== Applications ==
Anion-conducting channelrhodopsins (ACRs) have been used as optogenetic tools to inhibit neuronal activation. When expressed in nerve cells, ACRs act as light-gated chloride channels. Their effect on the activity of the neuron is comparable to GABA_{A} receptors, ligand-gated chloride channels found in inhibitory synapses: As the chloride concentration in mature neurons is very low, illumination results in an inward flux of negatively charged ions, clamping the neuron at the chloride reversal potential (- 65 mV). Under these conditions, excitatory synaptic inputs are not able to efficiently depolarize the neuron. This effect is known as shunting inhibition (as opposed to inhibition by hyperpolarization). Illuminating the dendrite prevents the generation of dendritic calcium spikes while illumination of the entire neuron blocks action potential initiation in response to sensory stimulation. Axon terminals, however, have a higher chloride concentration and are therefore excited by ACRs. To inhibit neurons with wide-field illumination, it has proven useful to restrict ACRs to the somatic compartment (ST variants).

Due to their high light sensitivity, ACRs can be activated with dim light which does not interfere with visual stimulation, even in very small animals like the fruit fly Drosophila. When combined with a red-light sensitive cation-conducting channelrhodopsin, ACRs allow for bidirectional control of neurons: Silencing with blue light, activation with red light ('Bipoles').
