= Light-gated ion channel =

Family of transport proteins

Light-gated ion channels are a family of ion channels regulated by electromagnetic radiation. Other gating mechanisms for ion channels include voltage-gated ion channels, ligand-gated ion channels, mechanosensitive ion channels, and temperature-gated ion channels. Most light-gated ion channels have been synthesized in the laboratory for study, although two naturally occurring examples, channelrhodopsin and anion-conducting channelrhodopsin, are currently known. Photoreceptor proteins, which act in a similar manner to light-gated ion channels, are generally classified instead as G protein-coupled receptors.

== Mechanism ==
Light-gated ion channels function in a similar manner to other gated ion channels. Such transmembrane proteins form pores through lipid bilayers to facilitate the passage of ions. These ions move from one side of the membrane to another under the influence of an electrochemical gradient. When exposed to a stimulus, a conformational change occurs in the transmembrane region of the protein to open or close the ion channel. In the specific case of light-gated ion channels, the transmembrane proteins are usually coupled with a smaller molecule that acts as a photoswitch. Photons interact with the switching molecule, which undergoes a change in its structural geometry. The switching molecule then interacts with the protein to alter the conformation state of the protein so that the pore changes from a closed state to an open state, or vice versa, thereby increasing or decreasing ion conductance. Retinal is a good example of a molecular photoswitch and is found in the naturally occurring channelrhodopsins.

== Synthetic isoforms ==
Once channelrhosopsin had been identified and characterized, the channel's ion selectivity was modified in order to control membrane potential through optogenetic control. Directed mutations of the channel changed the charges lining the pore, resulting in a pore which instead excluded cations in favor of anions.

Other types of gated ion channels, ligand-gated and voltage-gated, have been synthesized with a light-gated component in an attempt to better understand their nature and properties. By the addition of a light-gated section, the kinetics and mechanisms of operation can be studied in depth. For example, the addition of a light-gated component allows for the introduction of many highly similar ligands to be introduced to the binding site of a ligand-gated ion channel to assist in the determination of the mechanism.

Such ion channels have been modified by binding a photoswitch to confer photosensitivity on the ion channel. This is done through careful selection of a tether which can lengthen or shorten through photoisomerization. One side of the tether is bound to the ion channel protein and the other end of the tether is bound to a blocking group, which has a high binding affinity for an exposed portion of the pore. When the tether is lengthened, it allows the blocking section to bind to the pore and prevent ionic current. When the tether is shortened, it disrupts this obstruction and opens the pore. Kinetic studies have demonstrated that fine temporal and spatial control can be achieved in this manner.

Photoisomerization of azobenzene between its trans and cis isomers

Azobenzene is a common choice for the functional portion of a tether for synthetically-developed light-gated ion channels because of its well documented length change as either cis or trans isomers, as well as the excitation wavelength needed to induce photoisomerization. Azobenzene converts to its longer trans-isomer at a wavelength of λ=500 nm and to its cis-isomer at λ=380 nm.

In 1980, the first ion channel to be adapted for study with a light-gated mechanism was the nicotinic acetylcholine receptor. This receptor was well-known at the time, and so was aptly suited to adaptation, and allowed for a study of the kinetics as not allowed before.

The expression of light-gated ion channels in a specific cell type through promoter control allows for the regulation of cell potential by either depolarizing the membrane to 0 mV for cation-permeant channelrhodopsin or by holding the voltage at –67 mV for anion-conducting channelrhodopsin. Depolarization can conduct a current in the range of 5 fA per channel and occurs on the timescale of action potentials and neurotransmitter exocytosis. They have an advantage over other types of ion channel regulation in that they provide non-invasive, reversible membrane potential changes with fine temporal and spatial control granted by induction through laser stimuli. They reliably stimulate single action potentials with rapid depolarization and can be utilized in vivo because they do not require high intensity illumination to maintain function, unlike other techniques like light-activated proton pumps and photoactivatable probes.

== Examples ==
Examples of light-gated ion channels occur in both natural and synthetic environments. These include:

=== Naturally occurring ===
- Channelrhodopsins were the first discovered family of light-gated ion channels.
  - Channelrhodopsin-1 (from Chlamydomonas reinhardtii and Volvox)
  - Channelrhodopsin-2
  - Anion-conducting channelrhodopsin

=== Synthetically adapted ===
- Nicotinic acetylcholine receptor was the first ion channel to be synthetically adapted with a light-gated mechanism.
- Light-activated potassium channels have been engineered from bacterial K^{+} channels with the goal of inhibiting neuronal activity upon illumination. A second strategy is to combine a cyclic nucleotide gated K^{+} channel with a photoactivated adenylyl cyclase to inhibit neuronal activity at very low light levels.
- Many other fully synthetic, light-gated channels have been produced as well.
