= Optogenetic methods to record cellular activity =

Optogenetics began with methods to alter neuronal activity with light, using e.g. channelrhodopsins. In a broader sense, optogenetic approaches also include the use of genetically encoded biosensors to monitor the activity of neurons or other cell types by measuring fluorescence or bioluminescence, although these techniques substantially predated the first use of the term optogenetics. Genetically encoded calcium indicators (GECIs) are used frequently to monitor neuronal activity, but other cellular parameters such as membrane voltage or second messenger activity can also be recorded optically. The use of optogenetic sensors is not restricted to neuroscience, but plays increasingly important roles in immunology, cardiology and cancer research.

== History ==
The first experiments to measure intracellular calcium levels via protein expression were based on aequorin, a bioluminescent protein from the jellyfish Aequorea. To produce light, however, this enzyme needs the 'fuel' compound coelenteracine, which has to be added to the preparation. This is not practical in intact animals, and in addition, the temporal resolution of bioluminescence imaging is relatively poor (seconds-minutes). The first genetically encoded fluorescent calcium indicator (GECI) to be used to image activity in an animal was Cameleon, designed by Atsushi Miyawaki, Roger Tsien and coworkers in 1997. Cameleon was first used successfully in an animal by Rex Kerr, William Schafer and coworkers to record from neurons and muscle cells of the nematode C. elegans. Cameleon was subsequently used to record neural activity in flies and zebrafish. In mammals, the first GECI to be used in vivo was GCaMP, first developed by Junichi Nakai and coworkers in 2001. GCaMP has undergone numerous improvements, notably by a team of scientists at the Janelia Farm Research Campus (GENIE project, HHMI), and GCaMP6 in particular has become widely used in neuroscience.

Interestingly, the first genetically encoded voltage indicator (GEVI), FLaSh, was also reported in 1997, the same year as Cameleon. FLaSh was an insertion of green fluorescent protein (GFP) into a voltage-gated potassium channel, but encountered expression problems in neurons. Since then, numerous GEVI proteins have been developed based on either non-conducting channelrhodopsin mutants or GFP insertion into isolated voltage-sensing domains, and have become widely used in flies, zebrafish, and mammals. Recently, G protein-coupled receptors have been harnessed to generate a series of highly specific indicators for various neurotransmitters.

== Design principles ==
Genetically encoded sensors are fusion proteins, consisting of a ligand binding domain (sensor) and a fluorescent protein, attached by a short linker (flexible peptide). When the sensor domain binds the correct ligand, it changes conformation. This movement is transferred to the fluorescent protein and the resulting deformation leads to a change in fluorescence. The efficiency of this process depends critically on the length of the linker region, which has to be optimized in a labor-intensive process. The fluorescent protein is often circularly permuted, i.e. new C-terminal and N-terminal ends were created. Single-wavelength sensors are easy to use for qualitative measurements, but difficult to calibrate for quantitative measurements of ligand concentration. A notable exception are lifetime calcium biosensors that are suitable for FLIM.

A second class of sensors relies on Förster resonance energy transfer (FRET) between two fluorescent proteins (FP) of different color. The shorter wavelength FP (donor) is excited with blue light from a laser or LED. If the second FP (acceptor) is very close, the energy is transferred to the acceptor, resulting in yellow or red fluorescence. When the acceptor FP moves further away, the donor emits green fluorescence. The sensor domain is typically spliced between the two FPs, resulting in a hinge-type movement upon ligand binding that changes the distance between donor and acceptor. The imaging procedure is more complex for FRET sensors, but the fluorescence ratio can be calibrated to measure the absolute concentration of a ligand. Read-out via fluorescence lifetime imaging (FLIM) of donor fluorescence is also possible, as the FRET process speeds up the fluorescence decay.

== Advantages of optogenetic sensors ==
- can be targeted to specific classes of cells (e.g. astrocytes or pyramidal cells). This allows for optical read-out without spatial resolution, e.g. fiber photometry from deep brain areas.
- can be targeted to sub-cellular compartments (e.g. synapses, organelles, nucleus) by fusing the indicator protein with specific anchoring domains, retention signals or intrabodies.
- work in a variety of species (nematodes, insects, fish, mammals) and in cell culture systems (FLIPR assay)
- can be delivered by viral vectors (e.g. rAAV)
- can be used to record the activity of thousands of neurons at the same time

== Figures of merit ==
When designing or comparing indicators, the following parameters are important:

- Brightness, quantum yield: How many photons do I get from one indicator molecule? Brighter is better!
- Dynamic range: What is the difference in brightness between the bound and unbound form of the indicator? A large dynamic range is desirable, but comes with the practical problem that your cell may be invisible at rest.
- Affinity: What ligand concentration saturates 50% of my indicator?
- Kinetics: Fast kinetics is very important for short-lived signals, e.g. glutamate transients in the synaptic cleft.
- Hill coefficient: Do you need a gradual, near linear fluorescence response to quantify ligand concentration? Aim for a Hill coefficient = 1 and stay well below K_{D}. Do you want switch-like behavior to detect specific events, e.g. action potentials? Aim for a high Hill coefficient (multiple cooperative binding sites, e.g. calmodulin) and don't worry about indicator saturation.
- Expression level: Mainly determined by the promoter used to drive expression. Can be improved by codon optimization.

== Drawbacks, limitations ==
Genetically encoded indicators

- will buffer the measured ion or protein, potentially interfering with cellular signaling
- are subject to photobleaching and photoswitching, compromising long-term measurements
- can be toxic when expressed at very high concentration
- require highly sensitive cameras or laser scanning microscopes
- some sensors based on the G protein-coupled receptor (GPCR) are sensitive to light polarization
- most indicators are green fluorescent, making it difficult to measure several cellular parameters simultaneously (multiplexing).

== Classes of genetically encoded indicators ==
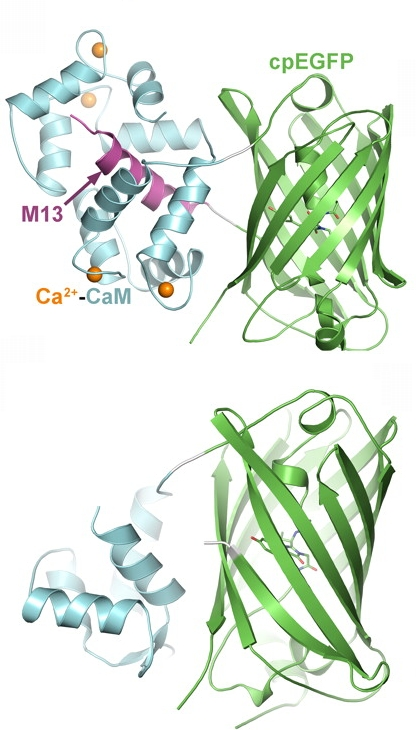
The calcium indicator GCaMP in its calcium-bound (top) and calcium-free form (bottom). When Ca-calmodulin (cyan) binds to M13, the conformation changes and the cpGFP barrel closes, enabling green fluorescence.

Indicators have been designed to measure ion concentrations, membrane potential, neurotransmitters, and various intracellular signaling molecules. A review of GPCR-based indicators for neuromodulators has been published by Rohner et al. (2024) The following list provides only examples for each class; many more have been published.

=== Intracellular signaling ===
- Genetically encoded calcium indicators (GECI): A large class of tools, based on natural calcium binding proteins (calmodulin, troponin). Different affinities, kinetics, and colors (green, red) available. Read-out via fluorescence intensity (single wavelength indicators), FRET or BRET. Have been targeted to various organelles. Current version: JGCaMP8
- Genetically encoded chloride indicators: Clomeleon
- Genetically encoded potassium indicators: GINKO2
- Genetically encoded indicators for intracellular pH (GEPhI): CypHer
- Genetically encoded voltage indicators (GEVI): ASAP5, Ace-mNeon2
- Genetically encoded vesicle fusion sensors: Synapto-pHluorin, Synaptophysin-pHluorin
- Genetically encoded cAMP sensors: EPAC
- Genetically encoded ATP sensors: QUEEN-37C
- Genetically encoded kinase activity sensors: CaMui, SmURFP
- Genetically encoded Small G-protein sensors: FRas

=== Neurotransmitters and other extracellular signals ===
- Genetically encoded glutamate sensors: GluSnFR
- Genetically encoded GABA sensors: iGABASnFR
- Genetically encoded dopamine sensors: dLight1, GRAB-DA
- Genetically encoded serotonin sensors: GRAB_{5-HT}, sDarken, iSeroSnFR
- Genetically encoded norepinephrine sensors: GRAB_{NE}
- Genetically encoded sensor for endocannabinoid activity: GRAB_{eCB2.0}
- Genetically encoded sensor for orexin/hypocretin neuropeptides: OxLight1
- Genetically encoded sensor for lactate: eLACCO1.1

== Databases of fluorescent biosensors ==
Databases of fluorescent biosensors are being built and published where hundreds of such fusion proteins are listed. Among those databases are:

- Fluorescent Biosensor Database, a fairly complete searchable list of published sensors and their basic properties, maintained by Jin Zhang's lab at UCSD.
- Fluorescent Biosensors available on Addgene, a nonprofit plasmid repository.
