= Zhuo-Hua Pan =

Chinese neuroscientist (born 1956)

- 潘卓华
- Born: 1956 (age 68–69); Pujiang County, Zhejiang, China
- Education: Jinhua No. 1 High School; University of Science and Technology of China; State University of New York at Buffalo
- Scientific career
- Fields: Neuroscience
- Institutions: Wayne State University

Chinese name
- Traditional Chinese: 潘卓華
- Simplified Chinese: 潘卓华
Transcriptions
Standard Mandarin
- Hanyu Pinyin: Pān Zhuóhuá
- Wade–Giles: Pan^{1} Cho^{2}-hua^{2}
- IPA: [pʰán ʈʂwǒ.xwǎ]

Zhuo-Hua Pan (Chinese: 潘卓华; pinyin: Pān Zhuóhuá; born 1956) is a Chinese-American neuroscientist, known for his foundational contributions to optogenetics. He is the Edward T. and Ellen K. Dryer Endowed Professor of Ophthalmology at Wayne State University, and Scientific Director of the Ligon Research Center of Vision at the university's Kresge Eye Institute.

== Education and career ==
Pan was born 1956 in Pujiang County of Jinhua, Zhejiang, China. After graduating from Jinhua No. 1 High School, he entered the University of Science and Technology of China in 1978 and earned his B.S. degree in 1982. He earned his M.S. in 1984 from the Institute of Biophysics, Chinese Academy of Sciences, and became an instructor at Zhejiang University afterwards.

In 1986, he moved to the United States to further his studies at the State University of New York at Buffalo. He earned his Ph.D. in 1990 and conducted postdoctoral research for another year.

From 1991 to 1997 he was an instructor of neurology at Harvard Medical School and Boston Children's Hospital. In 1998, he became an assistant professor of neurosurgery at Harvard and Brigham and Women's Hospital. He moved to Wayne State University School of Medicine in 1999, and was promoted to associate professor in 2003 and professor in 2007. In 2011, he was appointed the Edward T. and Ellen K. Dryer Endowed Professor of Ophthalmology and Kresge Eye Institute, and Scientific Director of the Ligon Research Center of Vision.

== Optogenetics ==
In the early 2000s, Pan envisioned implanting a light-sensitive protein, which converts light to electrical signals for neurons, into the eye to cure blindness. The method is now known as optogenetics. In the summer of 2004, he used a virus carrying the channelrhodopsin DNA to infect the ganglion cells in the eyes of blind mice, and successfully detected electrical activity when the cells were stimulated with light, a "revolutionary" first step in potentially restoring eyesight to the blind.

Pan and his collaborator, Alexander Dizhoor, submitted their paper reporting their work to Nature in November 2004. However, they were directed to the specialized journal Nature Neuroscience, which rejected the paper. In early 2005, they submitted it to the Journal of Neuroscience, but were again rejected. In May 2005, Pan presented his work at the Association for Research in Vision and Ophthalmology conference in Florida, which became the clearest public evidence of his invention.

Around the same time, other scientists around the world were doing similar research to Pan. In August 2005, Nature Neuroscience, the same journal that had rejected Pan's paper, published a paper by Stanford University scientists Edward Boyden and Karl Deisseroth describing their work using channelrhodopsin to make neurons detect light. Their research was hailed as a major breakthrough and caught the attention of mainstream media including The New York Times. When the journal Neuron finally published Pan's paper in April 2006, it was met with indifference.

Boyden and Deisseroth have since been rewarded with major grants and prizes, including The Brain Prize and the 2015 Breakthrough Prize in Life Sciences with a $3 million prize for each scientist, while Pan only won awards from his own university. In 2016, Stat News published a report which credits Pan as the inventor of optogenetics and brought attention to his contributions.

== RetroSense Therapeutics ==
Based on Pan's research, Sean Ainsworth started the company RetroSense Therapeutics in 2009. The company develops treatment for the genetic disease retinitis pigmentosa, which causes blindness and affects about 100,000 people in the United States. In 2016, Allergan bought RetroSense for $60 million.

== Publications ==
- Pan, Z.-H. Differential expression of high- and two types of low-voltage-activated calcium currents in rod and cone bipolar cells of the rat retina. J. Neurophysiol. 83:513–527, 2000.
- Pan, Z.-H. and Hu, H.-J. Voltage-dependent Na+ currents in mammalian retinal cone bipolar cells. J. Neurophysiol. 84:2564–2571, 2000.
- Pan, Z.-H., Hu, H.-J., Perring, P., and Andrade, R. T-type Ca2+ channels mediate neurotransmitter release in retinal bipolar cells. Neuron 32:89–98, 2001
- Cui, J., Ma, Y.-P., Lipton, S.A., Pan Z.-H. Glycine receptors and glycinergic synaptic input at the axon terminals of mammalian retinal rod bipolar cells. J. Physiol. 553:895–909, 2003.
- Bi, A., Cui, J., Ma, Y.-P., Olshevskaya, E., Pu, M., Dizhoor, A.M., and Pan Z.-H. Ectopic expression of a microbial-type rhodopsin restores visual responses in mice with photoreceptor degeneration. Neuron 50:23–33, 2006.
- Ivanova, E, Pan, Z.-H. Evaluation of virus mediated long-term expression of channelrhodopsin-2 in the mouse retina. Mol. Vision 15:1680–1689, 2009.
- Zhang, Y., Ivanova, E., Bi, A., and Pan, Z.-H. Ectopic expression of multiple microbial rhodopsins restores ON and OFF light responses in the retina after photoreceptor degeneration. J. Neurosci. 29:9186–96, 2009.
- Ivanova, E., Hwang, G.-S., Pan, Z.-H., and Troilo, D. Evaluation of AAV-mediated expression of chop2-GFP in the marmoset retina. Invest. Ophthalmol. Vis. Sci. 51:5288–5296, 2010.
- Wu, C., Ivanova, E., Cui, J., Lu Q. and Pan. Z.-H. Action potential generation at an AIS-like process in the axonless retinal AII amacrine cell. J. Neurosci. 31:14654–14659, 2011.
- Lu, Q., Ivanova, E., Ganjawala, H. T., and Pan, Z.-H. Cre-mediated recombination efficiency and transgene expression patterns of three retinal bipolar cell-expressing Cre transgenic mouse lines. Mol. Vision, 19:1310–1320, 2013
- Wu, C., Ivanova, E., Zhang, Y., Pan, Z.-H. AAV-mediated subcellular targeting of optogenetic tools in retinal ganglion cells. PLOS One, 8(6):e66332, 2013.
- Pan, Z.-H., Ganjawala, T.H., Lu, Q., Ivanova, E., and Zhang, Z. ChR2 mutants at L132 and T159 with improved operational light sensitivity for vision restoration. PLOS One, 9(6):e98924, 2014.
- Pan, Z.-H., Lu, Q., Bi, A., Dizhoor, A.M., and Abrams, G.W. Optogenetic approaches to restoring vision. Ann. Rev. Vision Sci. 1:185-210, 2015.
- Lu, Q., Ganjawala, H.T., Ivanova, E., Cheng, J.G., Troilo, D., and Pan, Z.-H. AAV-mediated transduction and targeting of retinal bipolar cells with improved mGluR6 promoters in rodents and primates. Gene Therapy, 23:680–9, 2016.
