= Optogenetics =

Controlling biological cells with light

Nobel Prize in Physiology or Medicine 2026: Optogenetics

Optogenetics is a biological technique used to characterize and manipulate the activity of neurons or other cell types with light. This is achieved by expression of light-sensitive ion channels, pumps or enzymes in the target brain cells. A specialization of this field is nano-optogenetics.

On the level of individual cells, light-activated enzymes and transcription factors allow precise control of biochemical signaling pathways. In systems neuroscience, the ability to control the activity of a genetically defined set of neurons has been used to understand their contribution to decision making, learning, fear memory, mating, addiction, feeding, and locomotion. In a medical application of optogenetic technology, vision was partially restored in a blind patient with retinitis pigmentosa.

Beyond individual cells, optogenetic techniques have been introduced to map the functional connectivity of the brain. By altering the activity of neurons and recording the activity of other cells using imaging and electrophysiology techniques, researchers can identify the statistical dependencies between cells and brain regions. In a broader sense, the field of optogenetics also includes methods to record cellular activity with genetically encoded indicators.

== History ==
In 1979, Francis Crick suggested that controlling all cells of one type in the brain, while leaving the others more or less unaltered, is a real challenge for neuroscience. Crick speculated that a technology using light might be useful to control neuronal activity with temporal and spatial precision but at the time there was no technique to make neurons responsive to light.

By the early 1990s LC Katz and E Callaway had shown that light could uncage glutamate. Heberle and Büldt in 1994 had already shown functional heterologous expression of a bacteriorhodopsin for light-activated ion flow in yeast. In 1995, Georg Nagel, Ernst Bamberg and their colleagues tried the heterologous expression of microbial rhodopsins (also bacteriorhodopsin and also in a non-neural system, Xenopus oocytes) and showed light-induced current.

The earliest genetically targeted method that used light to control rhodopsin-sensitized neurons was reported in January 2002, by Boris Zemelman and Gero Miesenböck, who employed Drosophila rhodopsin cultured mammalian neurons. In 2003, Zemelman and Miesenböck developed a second method for light-dependent activation of neurons in which single ionotropic channels TRPV1, TRPM8 and P2X2 were gated by photocaged ligands in response to light. Beginning in 2004, the Kramer and Isacoff groups developed organic photoswitches or "reversibly caged" compounds in collaboration with the Trauner group that could interact with genetically introduced ion channels. TRPV1 methodology, albeit without the illumination trigger, was subsequently used by several laboratories to alter feeding, locomotion and behavioral resilience in laboratory animals. However, light-based approaches for altering neuronal activity were not applied outside the original laboratories, likely because the easier to employ channelrhodopsin was cloned soon thereafter.

Peter Hegemann, studying the light response of green algae at the University of Regensburg, had discovered photocurrents that were too fast to be explained by the classic g-protein-coupled animal rhodopsins. Teaming up with the electrophysiologist Georg Nagel at the Max Planck Institute of Biophysics in Frankfurt, they could demonstrate that a single gene from the alga Chlamydomonas produced large photocurrents when expressed in the oocyte of a frog. To identify expressing cells, they replaced the cytoplasmic tail of the algal protein with a fluorescent protein YFP, generating the first generally applicable optogenetic tool. They stated in the 2003 paper that "expression of ChR2 in oocytes or mammalian cells may be used as a powerful tool to increase cytoplasmic Ca^{2+} concentration or to depolarize the cell membrane, simply by illumination".

Karl Deisseroth in the Bioengineering Department at Stanford University published the notebook pages from early July 2004 of his initial experiment showing light activation of neurons expressing a channelrhodopsin. In August 2005, his laboratory staff, including graduate students Ed Boyden and Feng Zhang, in collaboration with Georg Nagel, published the first demonstration of a single-component optogenetic system, in neurons using the channelrhodopsin-2(H134R)-eYFP mutant from Georg Nagel, which is the first mutant of channelrhodopsin-2 since its functional characterization by Georg Nagel and Hegemann.

Zhuo-Hua Pan of Wayne State University, researching on restore sight to blindness, tried channelrhodopsin out in ganglion cells—the neurons in human eyes that connect directly to the brain. Pan's first observation of optical activation of retinal neurons with channelrhodopsin was in February 2004 according to Pan, five months before Deisseroth's initial observation in July 2004. Indeed, the transfected neurons became electrically active in response to light, and in 2005 Zhuo-Hua Pan reported successful in-vivo transfection of channelrhodopsin in retinal ganglion cells of mice, and electrical responses to photostimulation in retinal slice culture. This approach was eventually realized in a human patient by Botond Roska and coworkers in 2021.

In April 2005, Susana Lima and Miesenböck reported the first use of genetically targeted P2X2 photostimulation to control the behaviour of an animal. They showed that photostimulation of genetically circumscribed groups of neurons, such as those of the dopaminergic system, elicited characteristic behavioural changes in fruit flies.

In October 2005, Lynn Landmesser and Stefan Herlitze also published the use of channelrhodopsin-2 to control neuronal activity in cultured hippocampal neurons and chicken spinal cord circuits in intact developing embryos. In addition, they introduced for the first time vertebrate rhodopsin, a light-activated G protein coupled receptor, as a tool to inhibit neuronal activity via the recruitment of intracellular signaling pathways also in hippocampal neurons and the intact developing chicken embryo.

The groups of Alexander Gottschalk and Georg Nagel made the first ChR2 mutant (H134R) and were first to use channelrhodopsin-2 for controlling neuronal activity in an intact animal, showing that motor patterns in the roundworm C. elegans could be evoked by light stimulation of genetically selected neural circuits (published in December 2005). In mice, controlled expression of optogenetic tools is often achieved with cell-type-specific Cre/loxP methods developed for neuroscience by Joe Z. Tsien back in the 1990s to activate or inhibit specific brain regions and cell-types in vivo.

In 2007, the labs of Boyden and Deisseroth (together with the groups of Gottschalk and Georg Nagel) simultaneously reported successful optogenetic inhibition of activity in neurons. The same year, Georg Nagel and Hegemann's groups started the optogenetic manipulation of cAMP. In 2014, Avelar et al. reported the first rhodopsin-guanylyl cyclase gene from fungus. In 2015, Scheib et al. and Gao et al. characterized the activity of the rhodopsin-guanylyl cyclase gene. And Shiqiang Gao et al. and Georg Nagel, Alexander Gottschalk identified it as the first 8 TM rhodopsin.

In October 2026, the Nobel Assembly at Karolinska Institutet announced Karl Deisseroth, Peter Hegemann, and Georg Nagel as the laureates of the Nobel Prize in Physiology or Medicine for their discoveries concerning light-gated ion channels and optogenetics.

== Description ==
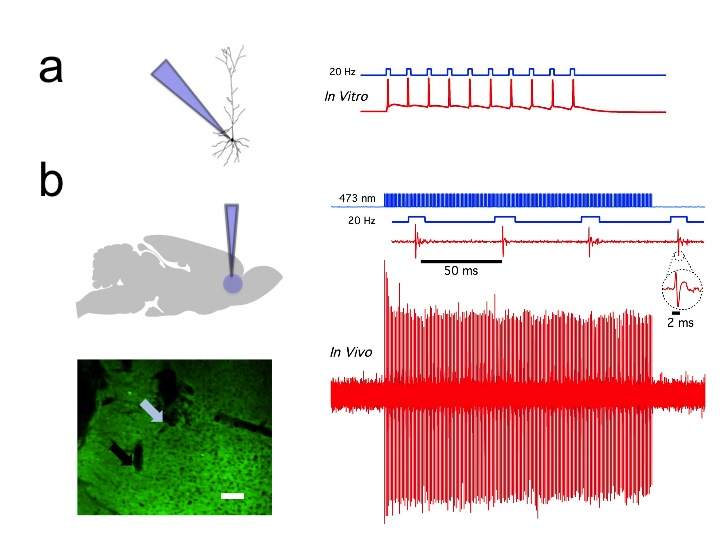
Fig 1. Channelrhodopsin-2 (ChR2) induces temporally precise blue light-driven activity in rat prelimbic prefrontal cortical neurons. a) In vitro schematic (left) showing blue light delivery and whole-cell patch-clamp recording of light-evoked activity from a fluorescent CaMKllα::ChR2-EYFP expressing pyramidal neuron (right) in an acute brain slice. b) In vivo schematic (left) showing blue light (473 nm) delivery and single-unit recording. (bottom left) Coronal brain slice showing expression of CaMKllα::ChR2-EYFP in the prelimbic region. Light blue arrow shows tip of the optical fiber; black arrow shows tip of the recording electrode (left). White bar, 100 μm. (bottom right) In vivo light recording of prefrontal cortical neuron in a transduced CaMKllα::ChR2-EYFP rat showing light-evoked spiking to 20 Hz delivery of blue light pulses (right). Inset, representative light-evoked single-unit response.

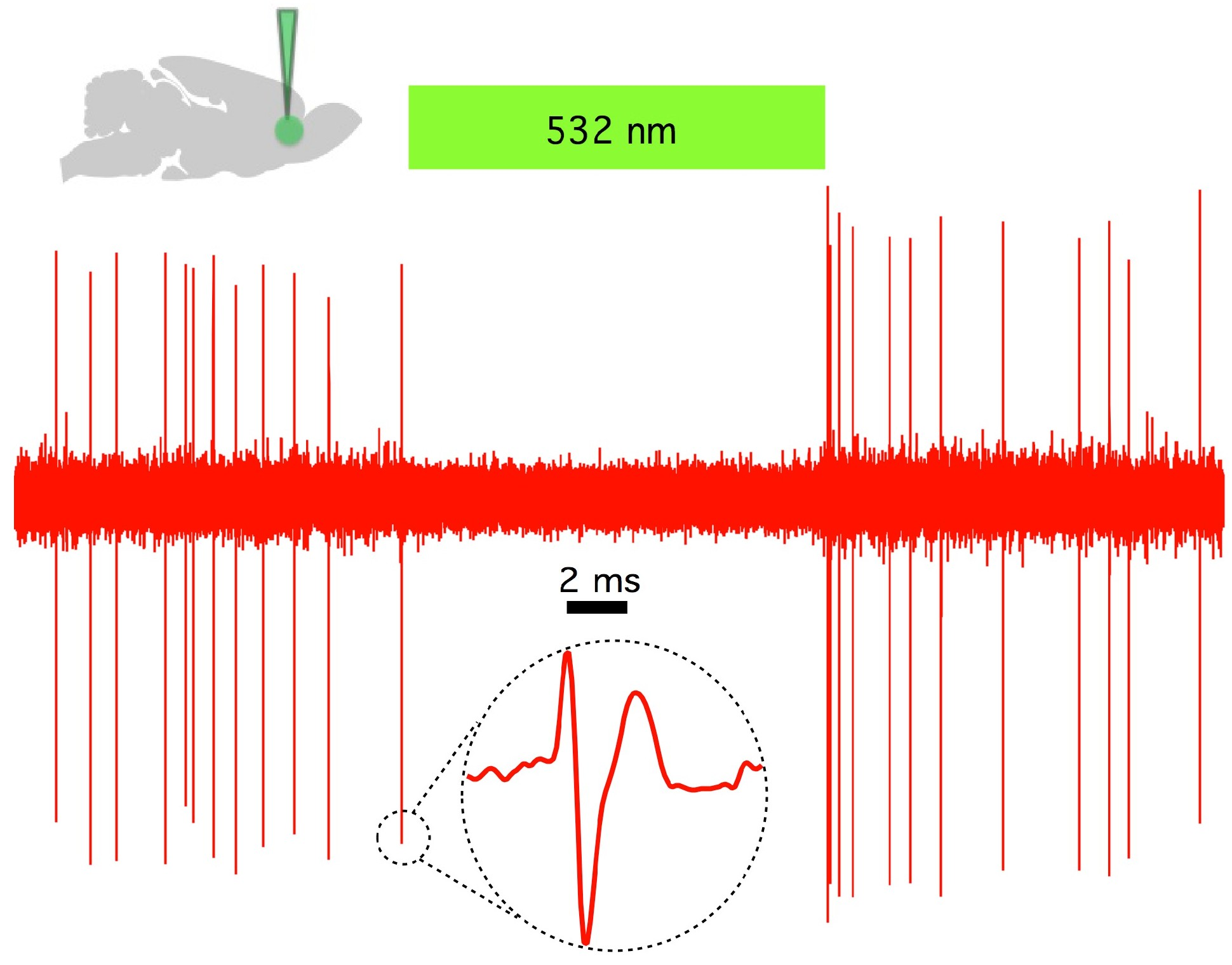
Fig 2. Halorhodopsin (NpHR) rapidly and reversibly silences spontaneous activity in vivo in rat prelimbic prefrontal cortex. (Top left) Schematic showing in vivo green (532 nm) light delivery and single- unit recording of a spontaneously active CaMKllα::eNpHR3.0- EYFP expressing pyramidal neuron. (Right) Example trace showing that continuous 532 nm illumination inhibits single-unit activity in vivo. Inset, representative single unit event; Green bar, 10 seconds.

A nematode expressing the light-sensitive ion channel Mac. Mac is a proton pump originally isolated in the fungus Leptosphaeria maculans and now expressed in the muscle cells of C. elegans that opens in response to green light and causes hyperpolarizing inhibition. Of note is the extension in body length that the worm undergoes each time it is exposed to green light, which is presumably caused by Mac's muscle-relaxant effects.

A nematode expressing ChR2 in its gubernacular-oblique muscle group responding to stimulation by blue light. Blue light stimulation causes the gubernacular-oblique muscles to repeatedly contract, causing repetitive thrusts of the spicule, as would be seen naturally during copulation.

Optogenetics provides millisecond-scale temporal precision which allows the experimenter to keep pace with fast biological information processing. Optogenetics by definition must operate on the millisecond timescale to allow addition or deletion of precise activity patterns within specific cells in the brains of intact animals (see Figure 1) and keep pace with optical control. This can be done with electrical recordings ("optrodes") or with biosensing reporter proteins created through the fusion of fluorescent proteins to detector proteins. Beyond its scientific impact, optogenetics represents an important case study in the value of both ecological conservation and in the importance of pure basic science. These opsins were studied over decades for their own sake by biophysicists and microbiologists before considering their potential value in neuroscience and neuropsychiatric disease.

Light-activated proteins: channels, pumps and enzymes

The hallmark of optogenetics is the introduction of fast light-activated channels, pumps, and enzymes that allow temporally precise manipulation of electrical and biochemical events while maintaining cell-type resolution through the use of specific targeting mechanisms. Among the microbial opsins which can be used to investigate the function of neural systems are the channelrhodopsins (ChR2, ChR1, VChR1, and SFOs) to excite neurons and anion-conducting channelrhodopsins for light-induced inhibition. Indirectly light-controlled potassium channels have recently been engineered to prevent action potential generation in neurons during blue light illumination. Light-driven ion pumps are also used to inhibit neuronal activity, e.g. halorhodopsin (NpHR), enhanced halorhodopsins (eNpHR2.0 and eNpHR3.0, see Figure 2), archaerhodopsin (Arch), fungal opsins (Mac) and enhanced bacteriorhodopsin (eBR).

Optogenetic control of well-defined biochemical events within behaving mammals is also possible. Building on prior work fusing vertebrate opsins to specific G-protein coupled receptors a family of chimeric single-component optogenetic tools was created that allowed researchers to manipulate within behaving mammals the concentration of defined intracellular messengers such as cAMP and IP3 in targeted cells. Other biochemical approaches to optogenetics followed soon thereafter when optical control over small GTPases and adenylyl cyclase was achieved in cultured cells using novel strategies from several different laboratories. Photoactivated adenylyl cyclases have been discovered in fungi and successfully used to control cAMP levels in mammalian neurons. G_{i/o}-coupled opsins (eOPN3, PdCO) were used to inhibit the fusion of synaptic vesicles in neurons in response to light, silencing their output. This emerging repertoire of optogenetic actuators allows for cell-type-specific and temporally precise control of multiple axes of cellular function within intact animals.

Hardware for light application

Another necessary factor is hardware (e.g. integrated fiberoptic and solid-state light sources) to allow specific cell types to be controlled in freely behaving animals. Most commonly, the latter is now achieved using the fiberoptic-coupled diode technology introduced in 2007. To avoid these use of implanted electrodes, researchers have engineered ways to inscribe and modify a transparent "window" made of zirconia in mice skulls to allow optical waves to penetrate more deeply to stimulate or inhibit individual neurons. To stimulate superficial brain areas such as the cerebral cortex, optical fibers or LEDs can be directly mounted to the skull of the animal. More deeply implanted optical fibers have been used to deliver light to deeper brain areas. Complementary to fiber-tethered approaches, completely wireless techniques have been developed utilizing wirelessly delivered power to headborne Light-emitting diodes LEDs for unhindered study of complex behaviors in freely behaving organisms.

Expression of optogenetic actuators

Optogenetics also includes the development of genetic targeting strategies such as cell-specific promoters or other customized conditionally-active viruses to deliver light-sensitive probes to specific populations of neurons in the brain of living animals (e.g. worms, fruit flies, mice, rats, and monkeys). In invertebrates such as worms and fruit flies some amount of all-trans-retinal (ATR) is supplemented with food. A key advantage of microbial opsins as noted above is that they are fully functional without the addition of exogenous co-factors in vertebrates.

== Technique ==
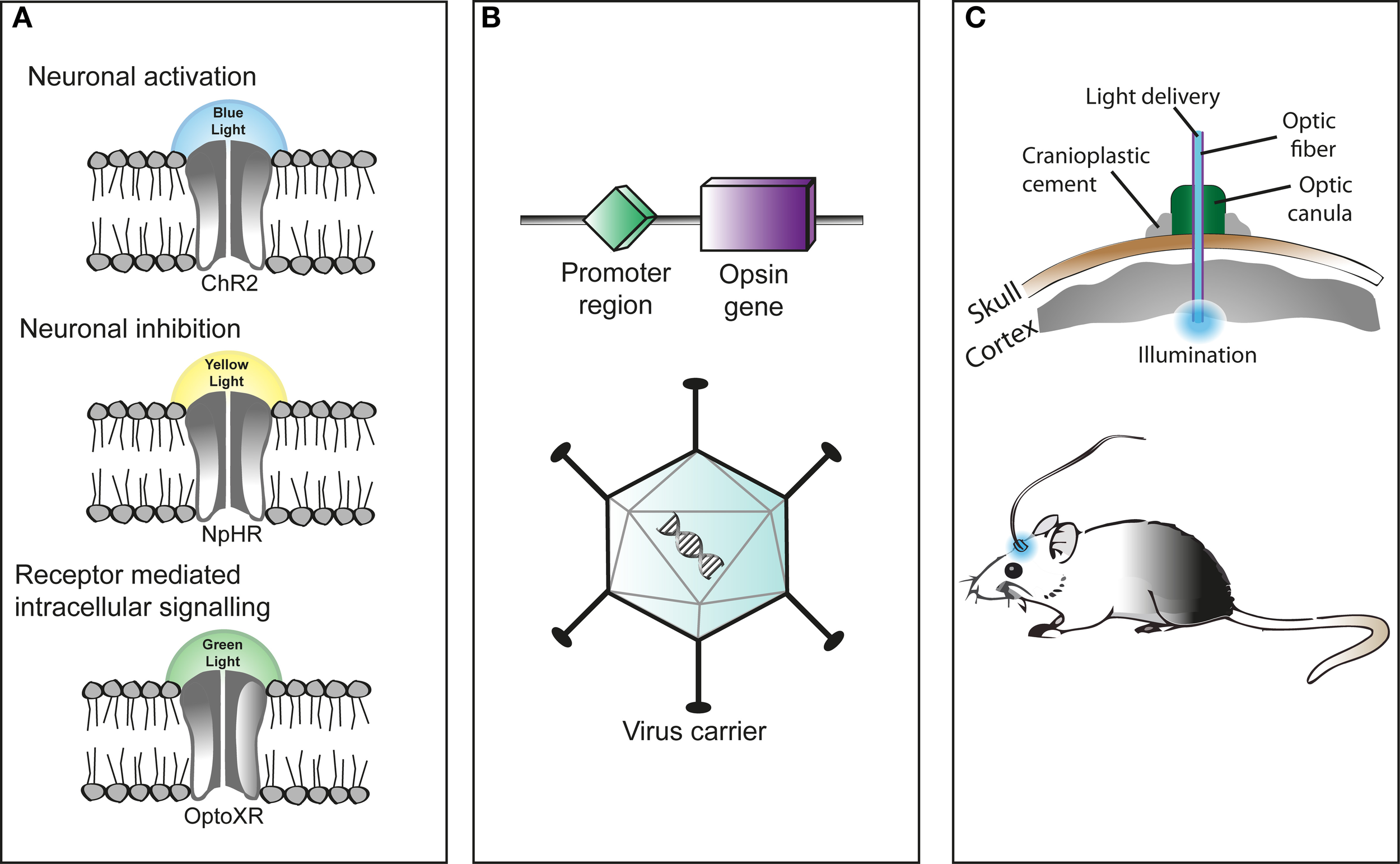
Three primary components in the application of optogenetics are as follows (A) Identification or synthesis of a light-sensitive protein (opsin) such as channelrhodopsin-2 (ChR2), halorhodopsin (NpHR), etc... (B) The design of a system to introduce the genetic material containing the opsin into cells for protein expression such as application of Cre recombinase or an adeno-associated-virus (C) application of light emitting instruments.

The technique of using optogenetics is flexible and adaptable to the experimenter's needs. Cation-selective channelrhodopsins (e.g. ChR2) are used to excite neurons, anion-conducting channelrhodopsins (e.g. GtACR2) inhibit neuronal activity. Combining these tools into a single construct (e.g. BiPOLES) allows for both inhibition and excitation, depending on the wavelength of illumination.

Introducing the microbial opsin into a specific subset of cells is challenging. One popular approach is to introduce an engineered viral vector that contains the optogenetic actuator gene attached to a specific promoter, such as CAMKIIα, allowing for some level of specificity. A more specific approach based on transgenic "driver" mice express Cre recombinase, an enzyme that catalyzes recombination between two lox-P sites in a specific subset of cells. By introducing an engineered viral vector containing the optogenetic actuator gene in between two lox-P sites, only the cells producing Cre recombinase will express the microbial opsin. This technique has allowed for modified optogenetic actuators to be used without the need to create a whole line of transgenic animals every time a new microbial opsin is needed.

After the introduction and expression of the microbial opsin, a computer-controlled light source has to be optically coupled to the brain region in question. LEDs or fiber-coupled diode-pumped solid-state lasers (DPSS) are frequently used. Recent advances include the advent of wireless head-mounted devices that apply LEDs to the targeted areas and as a result, give the animals more freedom to move.

Fiber-based approaches can also be used to combine optical stimulation and calcium imaging. This enables researchers to visualize and manipulate the activity of single neurons in awake behaving animals. It is also possible to record from multiple deep brain regions at the same using GRIN lenses connected via optical fiber to an externally positioned photodetector and photostimulator.

== Technical challenges and limitations ==
=== Selective expression ===
One of the main problems of optogenetics is that not all the cells in question may express the microbial opsin gene at the same level. Thus, even illumination with a defined light intensity will have variable effects on individual cells. Optogenetic stimulation of neurons in the brain is less controlled as the light intensity drops from the light source. Due to this, it remains difficult to target opsin to defined subcellular compartments. Restricting the opsin to specific regions of the plasma membrane such as dendrites, somata or axon terminals provides a more robust understanding of neuronal circuitry.

Mathematical modelling shows that selective expression of opsin in specific cell types can dramatically alter the dynamical behavior of the neural circuitry. In particular, optogenetic stimulation that preferentially targets inhibitory cells can transform the excitability of the neural tissue, affecting non-transfected neurons as well.

=== Kinetics and synchronization ===
The original channelrhodopsin-2 was slower closing than typical cation channels of cortical neurons, leading to prolonged depolarization and calcium influx. Furthermore, differences between natural spike and optogenetic activation patterns synchronously activate expressing neurons with pulsed light simulation, removing the possibility of sequential activity in the stimulated population. This not only makes it difficult to understand how the affected cells communicate with one another, but how their phasic properties of activation relate to circuit function.

To overcome these challenges, optogenetic activation has been combined with functional magnetic resonance imaging (fMRI) to elucidate the connectome, a thorough map of the brain's neural connections. Precisely timed optogenetic activation is used to calibrate the delayed hemodynamic signal (BOLD) fMRI is based on.

=== Light absorption spectrum ===
The opsin proteins currently in use have absorption peaks across the visual spectrum, but remain considerably sensitive to blue light. This spectral overlap makes it very difficult to combine opsin activation with genetically encoded indicators (GEVIs, GECIs, GluSnFR, synapto-pHluorin), most of which need blue light excitation. Opsins with infrared activation would, at a standard irradiance value, increase light penetration and augment resolution through reduction of light scattering.

=== Spatial response ===
Due to scattering, a narrow light beam to stimulate neurons in a patch of neural tissue can evoke a response profile that is much broader than the stimulation beam. In this case, neurons may be activated (or inhibited) unintentionally. Computational simulation tools are used to estimate the volume of stimulated tissue for different wavelengths of light.

== Applications ==
The field of optogenetics has furthered the fundamental scientific understanding of how specific cell types contribute to the function of biological tissues such as neural circuits in vivo. On the clinical side, optogenetics-driven research has led to insights into restoring with light, Parkinson's disease and other neurological and psychiatric disorders such as autism, Schizophrenia, drug abuse, anxiety, and depression. An experimental treatment for blindness involves a channel rhodopsin expressed in ganglion cells, stimulated with light patterns from engineered goggles.

=== Identification of particular neurons and networks ===
==== Amygdala ====
Optogenetic approaches have been used to map neural circuits in the amygdala that contribute to fear conditioning. One such example of a neural circuit is the connection made from the basolateral amygdala to the dorsal-medial prefrontal cortex where neuronal oscillations of 4 Hz have been observed in correlation to fear induced freezing behaviors in mice. Transgenic mice were introduced with channelrhodoposin-2 attached with a parvalbumin-Cre promoter that selectively infected interneurons located both in the basolateral amygdala and the dorsal-medial prefrontal cortex responsible for the 4 Hz oscillations. The interneurons were optically stimulated generating a freezing behavior and as a result provided evidence that these 4 Hz oscillations may be responsible for the basic fear response produced by the neuronal populations along the dorsal-medial prefrontal cortex and basolateral amygdala.

Further optogenetic manipulations of the central amygdala (CeA) revealed the regions role in robust sensorimotor functions. Using mice models, in vivo calcium imaging revealed activation of neuronal populations expressing the transcription factor Isl1 at the onset of biting. Neuronal activity was directly proportional to the hardness of the object being bitten, suggesting the neurons' role in force modulation. Optogenetic activation of CeA^{Isl1} neurons reinforced and enhanced biting behaviors while inhibition impaired biting through reducing jaw-closing muscle activity. Furthermore, activation of CeA^{Isl1} projections to the parvocellular reticular formation (PCRt) and pedunculopontine tegmental nucleus (PPtg) resulted in increased biting frequency and duration, suggesting a link between motivational states and motor output.

==== Anterior cingulate cortex ====
Optogenetic techniques have also been utilized to investigate pain pathways involved in chronic and neuropathic pain. The anterior cingulate cortex (ACC) is a highly interconnected structure within the limbic system responsible for pain processing. Long-term potentiation of these signals characterizes neuropathic pain development. Simulation of inhibitory neurons in the ACC expressing channelrhodopsin-2 resulted in a reduction of reflexive acute pain responses in mice. Such studies show that modulation of inhibitory pathways involved in pain processing yield a viable method for controlling inflammatory and neuropathic pain.

==== Olfactory bulb ====
Optogenetic activation of olfactory sensory neurons was critical for demonstrating timing in odor processing and for mechanism of neuromodulatory mediated olfactory guided behaviors (e.g. aggression, mating) In addition, with the aid of optogenetics, evidence has been reproduced to show that the "afterimage" of odors is concentrated more centrally around the olfactory bulb, rather than on the periphery where the olfactory receptor neurons are located. Transgenic mice infected with channel-rhodopsin Thy1-ChR2, were stimulated with a 473 nm laser transcranially positioned over the dorsal section of the olfactory bulb. Longer photostimulation of mitral cells in the olfactory bulb led to observations of longer lasting neuronal activity in the region after the photostimulation had ceased, meaning the olfactory sensory system is able to undergo long term changes and recognize differences between old and new odors.

==== Nucleus accumbens ====
Optogenetics, freely moving mammalian behavior, in vivo electrophysiology, and slice physiology have been integrated to probe the cholinergic interneurons of the nucleus accumbens by direct excitation or inhibition. Despite representing less than 1% of the total population of accumbal neurons, these cholinergic cells are able to control the activity of the dopaminergic terminals that innervate medium spiny neurons (MSNs) in the nucleus accumbens. These accumbal MSNs are known to be involved in the neural pathway through which cocaine exerts its effects, because decreasing cocaine-induced changes in the activity of these neurons has been shown to inhibit cocaine conditioning. The few cholinergic neurons present in the nucleus accumbens may prove viable targets for pharmacotherapy in the treatment of cocaine dependence.

==== Prefrontal cortex ====
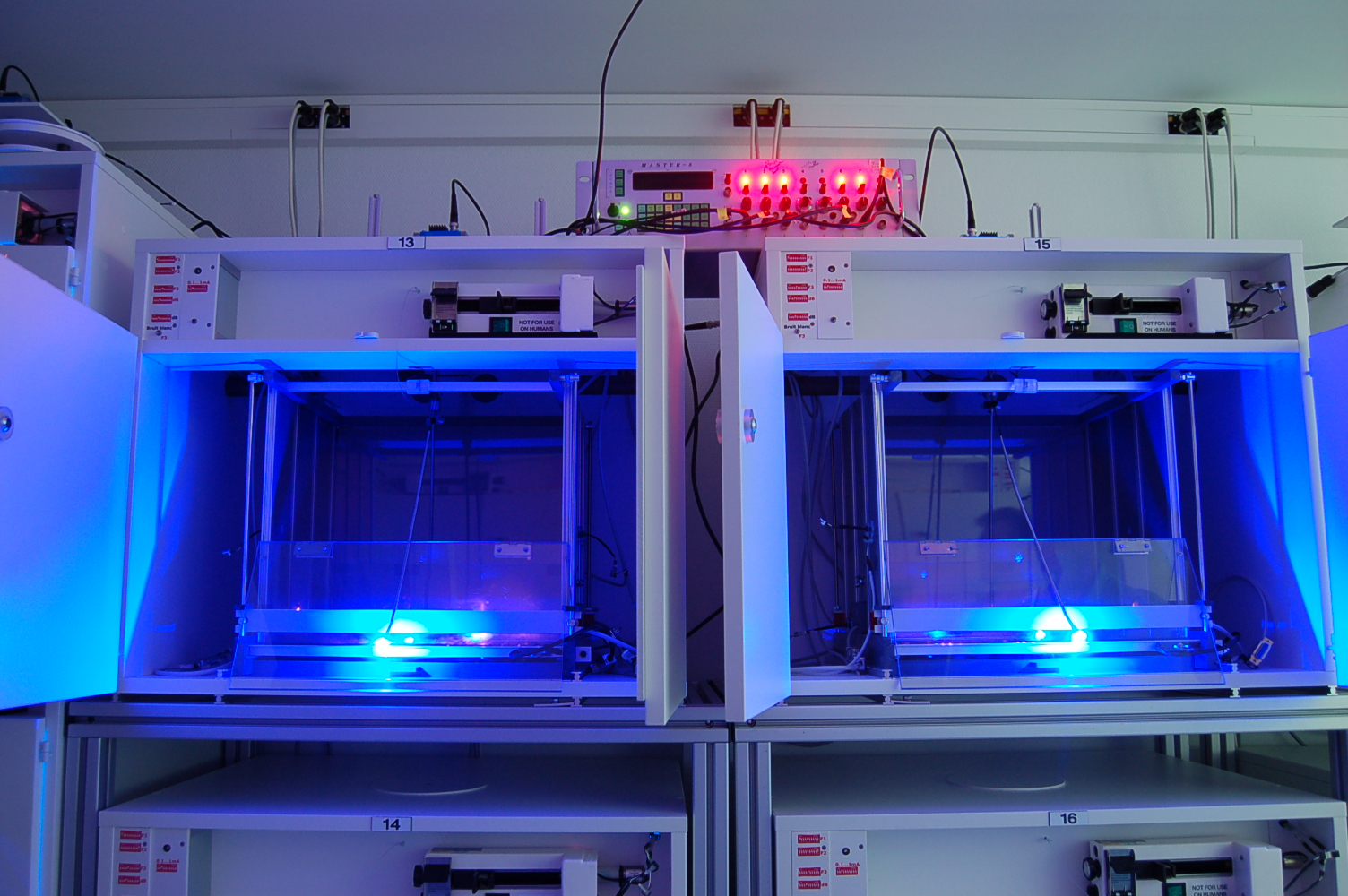
Cages for rat equipped with optogenetic LED commutators which permit in vivo study of animal behavior during optogenetic stimulations

In vivo and in vitro recordings from the University of Colorado, Boulder Optophysiology Laboratory of Donald C. Cooper Ph.D. showing individual CAMKII AAV-ChR2 expressing pyramidal neurons within the prefrontal cortex that demonstrated high fidelity action potential output with short pulses of blue light at 20 Hz (Figure 1).

==== Motor and piriform cortex ====
In vivo repeated optogenetic stimulation in healthy animals was able to eventually induce seizures. This model has been termed optokindling. In vitro studies have revealed a loss of feedback inhibition in the piriform circuit due to impaired GABA synthesis.

==== Heart ====
Optogenetics was applied on atrial cardiomyocytes to end spiral wave arrhythmias, found to occur in atrial fibrillation, with light. This method is still in the development stage. A recent study explored the possibilities of optogenetics as a method to correct for arrhythmias and resynchronize cardiac pacing. The study introduced channelrhodopsin-2 into cardiomyocytes in ventricular areas of hearts of transgenic mice and performed in vitro studies of photostimulation on both open-cavity and closed-cavity mice. Photostimulation led to increased activation of cells and thus increased ventricular contractions resulting in increasing heart rates. In addition, this approach has been applied in cardiac resynchronization therapy (CRT) as a new biological pacemaker as a substitute for electrode based-CRT. Lately, optogenetics has been used in the heart to defibrillate ventricular arrhythmias with local epicardial illumination, a generalized whole heart illumination or with customized stimulation patterns based on arrhythmogenic mechanisms in order to lower defibrillation energy.

==== Spiral ganglion ====
Optogenetic stimulation of the spiral ganglion in deaf mice restored auditory activity. Optogenetic application onto the cochlear region allows for the stimulation or inhibition of the spiral ganglion cells (SGN). In addition, due to the characteristics of the resting potentials of SGN's, different variants of the protein channelrhodopsin-2 have been employed such as Chronos, CatCh and f-Chrimson. Chronos and CatCh variants are particularly useful in that they have less time spent in their deactivated states, which allow for more activity with less bursts of blue light emitted. Additionally, using engineered red-shifted channels as f-Chrimson allow for stimulation using longer wavelengths, which decreases the potential risks of phototoxicity in the long term without compromising gating speed. The result being that the LED producing the light would require less energy and the idea of cochlear prosthetics in association with photo-stimulation, would be more feasible.

==== Brainstem ====
Optogenetic stimulation of a modified red-light excitable channelrhodopsin (ReaChR) expressed in the facial motor nucleus enabled minimally invasive activation of motor neurons effective in driving whisker movements in mice. One novel study employed optogenetics on the Dorsal Raphe Nucleus to both activate and inhibit dopaminergic release onto the ventral tegmental area. To produce activation transgenic mice were infected with channelrhodopsin-2 with a TH-Cre promoter and to produce inhibition the hyperpolarizing opsin NpHR was added onto the TH-Cre promoter. Results showed that optically activating dopaminergic neurons led to an increase in social interactions, and their inhibition decreased the need to socialize only after a period of isolation.

==== Visual system ====
Studying the visual system using optogenetics can be challenging. Indeed, the light used for optogenetic control may lead to the activation of photoreceptors, as a result of the proximity between primary visual circuits and these photoreceptors. In this case, spatial selectivity is difficult to achieve (particularly in the case of the fly optic lobe). Thus, the study of the visual system requires spectral separation, using channels that are activated by different wavelengths of light than rhodopsins within the photoreceptors (peak activation at 480 nm for Rhodopsin 1 in Drosophila). Red-shifted CsChrimson or bistable channelrhodopsin are used for optogenetic activation of neurons (i.e. depolarization), as both allow spectral separation. In order to achieve neuronal silencing (i.e. hyperpolarization), an anion channelrhodopsin discovered in the cryptophyte algae species Guillardia theta (named GtACR1). can be used. GtACR1 is more light sensitive than other inhibitory channels such as the Halorhodopsin class of chlorid pumps and imparts a strong conductance. As its activation peak (515 nm) is close to that of Rhodopsin 1, it is necessary to carefully calibrate the optogenetic illumination as well as the visual stimulus. The factors to take into account are the wavelength of the optogenetic illumination (possibly higher than the activation peak of GtACR1), the size of the stimulus (in order to avoid the activation of the channels by the stimulus light) and the intensity of the optogenetic illumination. It has been shown that GtACR1 can be a useful inhibitory tool in optogenetic study of Drosophila's visual system by silencing T4/T5 neurons expression. These studies can also be led on intact behaving animals, for instance to probe optomotor response.

==== Sensorimotor system ====
Optogenetically inhibiting or activating neurons tests their necessity and sufficiency, respectively, in generating a behavior. Using this approach, researchers can dissect the neural circuitry controlling motor output. By perturbing neurons at various places in the sensorimotor system, researchers have learned about the role of descending neurons in eliciting stereotyped behaviors, how localized tactile sensory input and activity of interneurons alters locomotion, and the role of Purkinje cells in generating and modulating movement. This is a powerful technique for understanding the neural underpinnings of animal locomotion and movement more broadly.

=== Precise temporal control of interventions ===
The currently available optogenetic actuators allow for the accurate temporal control of the required intervention (i.e. inhibition or excitation of the target neurons) with precision routinely going down to the millisecond level. The temporal precision varies, however, across optogenetic actuators, and depends on the frequency and intensity of the stimulation.

Experiments can now be devised where the light used for the intervention is triggered by a particular element of behavior (to inhibit the behavior), a particular unconditioned stimulus (to associate something to that stimulus) or a particular oscillatory event in the brain (to inhibit the event). This kind of approach has already been used in several brain regions:

==== Hippocampus ====
Sharp waves and ripple complexes (SWRs) are distinct high frequency oscillatory events in the hippocampus thought to play a role in memory formation and consolidation. These events can be readily detected by following the oscillatory cycles of the on-line recorded local field potential. In this way the onset of the event can be used as a trigger signal for a light flash that is guided back into the hippocampus to inhibit neurons specifically during the SWRs and also to optogenetically inhibit the oscillation itself. These kinds of "closed-loop" experiments are useful to study SWR complexes and their role in memory.

=== Cellular biology/cell signaling pathways ===
Optogenetic control of cellular forces and induction of mechanotransduction. Pictured cells receive an hour of imaging concurrent with blue light that pulses every 60 seconds. This is also indicated when the blue point flashes onto the image. The cell relaxes for an hour without light activation and then this cycle repeats again. The square inset magnifies the cell's nucleus.

Analogously to how natural light-gated ion channels such as channelrhodopsin-2 allows optical control of ion flux, which is especially useful in neuroscience, natural light-controlled signal transduction proteins also allow optical control of biochemical pathways, including both second-messenger generation and protein-protein interactions, which is especially useful in studying cell and developmental biology. In 2002, the first example of using photoproteins from another organism for controlling a biochemical pathway was demonstrated using the light-induced interaction between plant phytochrome and phytochrome-interacting factor (PIF) to control gene transcription in yeast. By fusing phytochrome to a DNA-binding domain and PIF to a transcriptional activation domain, transcriptional activation of genes recognized by the DNA-binding domain could be induced by light. This study anticipated aspects of the later development of optogenetics in the brain, for example, by suggesting that "Directed light delivery by fiber optics has the potential to target selected cells or tissues, even within larger, more-opaque organisms." The literature has been inconsistent as to whether control of cellular biochemistry with photoproteins should be subsumed within the definition of optogenetics, as optogenetics in common usage refers specifically to the control of neuronal firing with opsins, and as control of neuronal firing with opsins postdates and uses distinct mechanisms from control of cellular biochemistry with photoproteins.

==== Photosensitive proteins used in various cell signaling pathways ====
In addition to phytochromes, which are found in plants and cyanobacteria, LOV domains(Light-oxygen-voltage-sensing domain) from plants and yeast and cryptochrome domains from plants are other natural photosensory domains that have been used for optical control of biochemical pathways in cells. In addition, a synthetic photosensory domain has been engineered from the fluorescent protein Dronpa for optical control of biochemical pathways. In photosensory domains, light absorption is either coupled to a change in protein-protein interactions (in the case of phytochromes, some LOV domains, cryptochromes, and Dronpa mutants) or a conformational change that exposes a linked protein segment or alters the activity of a linked protein domain (in the case of phytochromes and some LOV domains). Light-regulated protein-protein interactions can then be used to recruit proteins to DNA, for example to induce gene transcription or DNA modifications, or to the plasma membrane, for example to activate resident signaling proteins. CRY2 also clusters when active, so has been fused with signaling domains and subsequently photoactivated to allow for clustering-based activation. The LOV2 domain of Avena sativa(common oat) has been used to expose short peptides or an active protein domain in a light-dependent manner. Introduction of this LOV domain into another protein can regulate function through light induced peptide disorder. The asLOV2 protein, which optogenetically exposes a peptide, has also been used as a scaffold for several synthetic light induced dimerization and light induced dissociation systems (iLID and LOVTRAP, respectively). The systems can be used to control proteins through a protein splitting strategy. Photodissociable Dronpa domains have also been used to cage a protein active site in the dark, uncage it after cyan light illumination, and recage it after violet light illumination.

==== Temporal control of signal transduction with light ====
The ability to optically control signals for various time durations is being explored to elucidate how cell signaling pathways convert signal duration and response to different outputs. Natural signaling cascades are capable of responding with different outputs to differences in stimulus timing duration and dynamics. For example, treating PC12 cells with epidermal growth factor (EGF, inducing a transient profile of ERK activity) leads to cellular proliferation whereas introduction of nerve growth factor (NGF, inducing a sustained profile of ERK activity) leads to differentiation into neuron-like cells. This behavior was initially characterized using EGF and NGF application, but the finding has been partially replicated with optical inputs. In addition, a rapid negative feedback loop in the RAF-MEK-ERK pathway was discovered using pulsatile activation of a photoswitchable RAF engineered with photodissociable Dronpa domains.

=== Optogenetic noise-photostimulation ===
Professor Elias Manjarrez's research group introduced the Optogenetic noise-photostimulation. This is a technique that uses random noisy light to activate neurons expressing ChR2. An optimal level of optogenetic-noise photostimulation on the brain can increase the somatosensory evoked field potentials, the firing frequency response of pyramidal neurons to somatosensory stimulation, and the sodium current amplitude.

== Awards ==
In 2010, optogenetics was chosen as the "Method of the Year" across all fields of science and engineering by the interdisciplinary research journal Nature Methods and was highlighted in the academic research journal Science on "Breakthroughs of the Decade". In the same year, Georg Nagel, Peter Hegemann and Ernst Bamberg were awarded the Wiley Prize in Biomedical Sciences and were among those awarded the Karl Heinz Beckurts Prize. Additionally, Karl Deisseroth was awarded the inaugural HFSP Nakasone Award for "his pioneering work on the development of optogenetic methods for studying the function of neuronal networks underlying behavior".

In 2012, Bamberg, Deisseroth, Hegemann and Nagel were awarded the Zülch Prize by the Max Planck Society, and Miesenböck was awarded the Baillet Latour Health Prize for "having pioneered optogenetic approaches to manipulate neuronal activity and to control animal behaviour."

In 2013, Georg Nagel and Hegemann were among those awarded the Louis-Jeantet Prize for Medicine. Also that year, year Bamberg, Boyden, Deisseroth, Hegemann, Miesenböck and Georg Nagel were jointly awarded The Brain Prize for "their invention and refinement of optogenetics."

In 2017, Deisseroth was awarded the Else Kröner Fresenius Research Prize for "his discoveries in optogenetics and hydrogel-tissue chemistry, as well as his research into the neural circuit basis of depression."

In 2018, the Inamori Foundation presented Deisseroth with the Kyoto Prize for "spearheading optogenetics" and "revolutionizing systems neuroscience research."

In 2019, Bamberg, Boyden, Deisseroth, Hegemann, Miesenböck and Georg Nagel were awarded the Rumford Prize by the American Academy of Arts and Sciences in recognition of "their extraordinary contributions related to the invention and refinement of optogenetics."

In 2020, Deisseroth was awarded the Heineken Prize for Medicine from the Royal Netherlands Academy of Arts and Sciences, for developing optogenetics and hydrogel-tissue chemistry. The same year, Miesenböck, Hegemann and Georg Nagel jointly received the Shaw Prize in Life Science and Medicine.

In 2021, Hegemann, Deisseroth and Dieter Oesterhelt received the Albert Lasker Award for Basic Medical Research.

In 2022, Columbia University Irving Medical Center awarded the Louisa Gross Horwitz Prize to Deisseroth, Hegemann and Miesenböck for their research ultimately laying the foundation for the field of optogenetics.

In 2026, the Nobel Prize in Physiology or Medicine was awarded to Karl Deisseroth, Peter Hegemann and Georg Nagel "for their discoveries concerning light-gated ion channels and optogenetics".
