= Axon terminal =

Nerve fiber part

An axon terminal (A) transmits a signal to neuron B (receiving). Features: 1. Mitochondrion. 2. Synaptic vesicle filled with neurotransmitter molecules. 3. Autoreceptor. 4. Synaptic cleft with neurotransmitter molecules. 5. Postsynaptic receptors activated by neurotransmitters (induction of a postsynaptic potential). 6. Calcium channel. 7. Exocytosis of a vesicle. 8. Reuptake of neurotransmitter.

Axon terminals (also called terminal boutons, synaptic boutons, end-feet, or presynaptic terminals) are distal terminations of the branches of an axon. An axon, also called a nerve fiber, is a long, slender projection of a nerve cell that conducts electrical impulses called action potentials away from the neuron's cell body to transmit those impulses to other neurons, muscle cells, or glands. Most presynaptic terminals in the central nervous system are formed along the axons (en passant boutons), not at their ends (terminal boutons).

Functionally, the axon terminal converts an electrical signal into a chemical signal. When an action potential arrives at an axon terminal (A), the neurotransmitter is released and diffuses across the synaptic cleft. If the postsynaptic cell (B) is also a neuron, activation of neurotransmitter receptors generate a small electrical current that changes the postsynaptic potential. If the postsynaptic cell (B) is a muscle cell (neuromuscular junction), it contracts.

== Neurotransmitter release ==
Axon terminals are specialized to release neurotransmitters very rapidly by exocytosis. Neurotransmitter molecules are packaged into synaptic vesicles called quanta that cluster beneath the axon terminal membrane on the presynaptic side (A) of a synapse. Some of these vesicles are docked, i.e., connected to the membrane by several specialized proteins, such as the SNARE complex. The incoming action potential activates voltage-gated calcium channels, leading to an influx of calcium ions into the axon terminal. The SNARE complex reacts to these calcium ions. It forces the vesicle's membrane to fuse with the presynaptic membrane, releasing its contents into the synaptic cleft within 180 μs of calcium entry. When receptors in the postsynaptic membrane bind this neurotransmitter and open ion channels, information is transmitted between neurons (A) and neurons (B). To generate an action potential in the postsynaptic neuron, many excitatory synapses must be active at the same time.

== Imaging the activity of axon terminals ==
Structure of a typical neuron with Schwann cells in the peripheral nervous system

Historically, calcium-sensitive dyes were the first tool to quantify the calcium influx into synaptic terminals and to investigate the mechanisms of short-term plasticity. The process of exocytosis can be visualized with pH-sensitive fluorescent proteins (Synapto-pHluorin): Before release, vesicles are acidic, and the fluorescence is quenched. Upon release, they are neutralized, generating a brief flash of green fluorescence. Another possibility is to construct a genetically encoded sensor that becomes fluorescent when bound to a specific neurotransmitter, e.g., glutamate. This method is sensitive enough to detect the fusion of a single transmitter vesicle in brain tissue and to measure the release probability at individual synapses.

== See also ==
- Calyx of Held, a giant axon terminal in the auditory system
- Neuromuscular junction, axon terminal contacting a muscle cell
- Endocytosis to recycle vesicles after use
- Vesicular monoamine transporter, loading vesicles with neurotransmitter.
- Optogenetic methods to measure cellular activity
