= Photostimulation =

Photostimulation is the use of light to artificially activate biological compounds, cells, tissues, or even whole organisms. Photostimulation can be used to noninvasively probe various relationships between different biological processes, using only light. In the long run, photostimulation has the potential for use in different types of therapy, such as migraine headache. Additionally, photostimulation may be used for the mapping of neuronal connections between different areas of the brain by “uncaging” signaling biomolecules with light. Therapy with photostimulation has been called light therapy, phototherapy, or photobiomodulation.

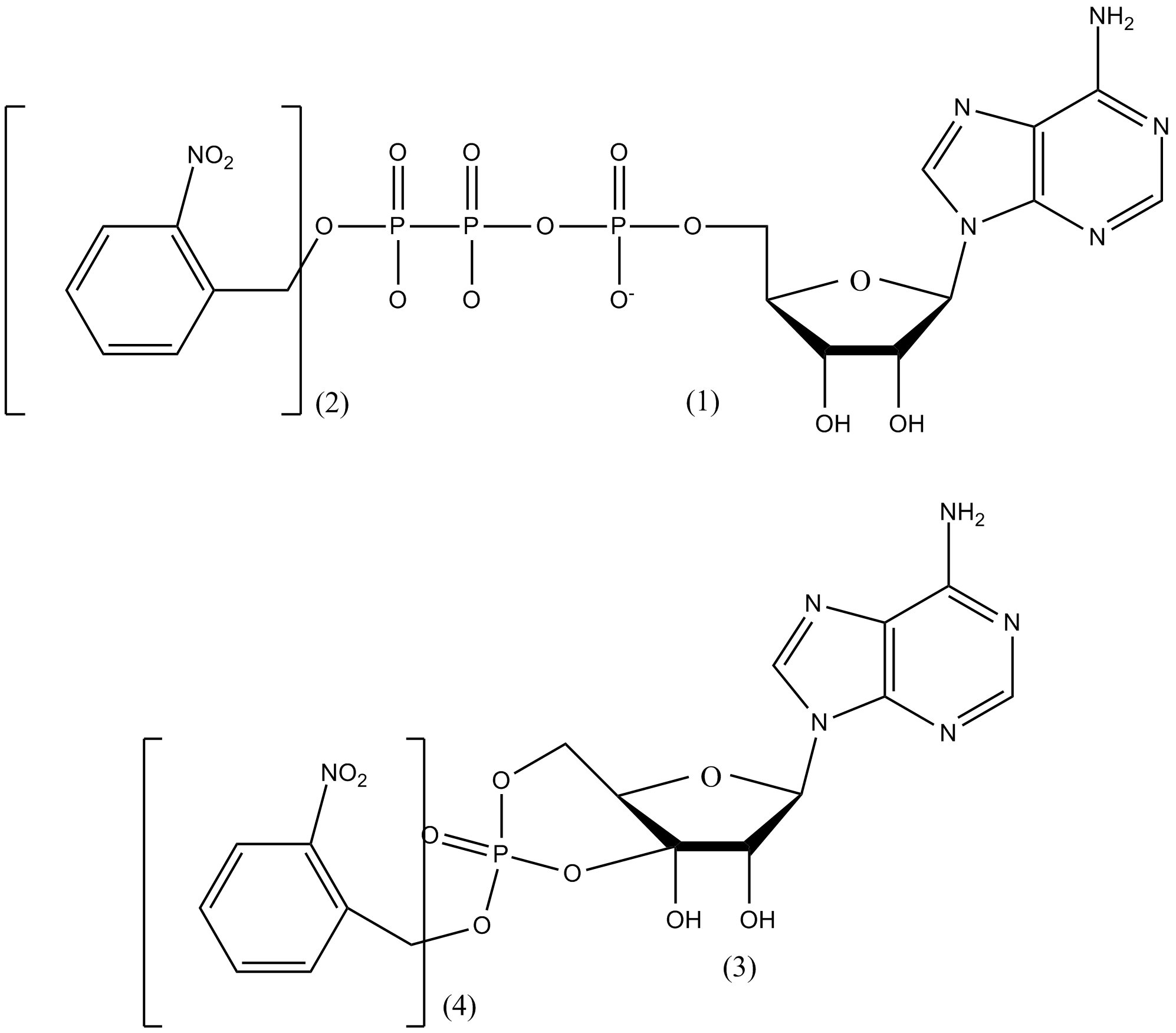
ATP(1) can be inactivated until photolysis by the addition of a caging group(2). Likewise, the active site of cAMP(3) can be inactivated by the addition of a caging group(4).

Photostimulation methods fall into two general categories: one set of methods uses light to uncage a compound that then becomes biochemically active, binding to a downstream effector. For example, uncaging glutamate is useful for finding excitatory connections between neurons, since the uncaged glutamate mimics the natural synaptic activity of one neuron impinging upon another. The other major photostimulation method is the use of light to activate a light-sensitive protein such as rhodopsin, which can then excite the cell expressing the opsin.

Scientists have long postulated the need to control one type of cell while leaving those surrounding it untouched and unstimulated. Well-known scientific advancements such as the use of electrical stimuli and electrodes have succeeded in neural activation but fail to achieve the aforementioned goal because of their imprecision and inability to distinguish between different cell types. The use of optogenetics (artificial cell activation via the use of light stimuli) is unique in its ability to deliver light pulses in a precise and timely fashion. Optogenetics is somewhat bidirectional in its ability to control neurons. Channels can be either depolarized or hyperpolarized depending on the wavelength of light that targets them. For instance, the technique can be applied to channelrhodopsin cation channels to initiate neuronal depolarization and eventually activation upon illumination. Conversely, activity inhibition of a neuron can be triggered via the use of optogenetics as in the case of the chloride pump halorhodopsin which functions to hyperpolarize neurons.

Before optogenetics can be performed, however, the subject at hand must express the targeted channels. Natural and abundant in microbials, rhodopsins—including bacteriorhodopsin, halorhodopsin and channelrhodopsin—each have a different characteristic action spectrum which describes the set of colors and wavelengths that they respond to and are driven to function by.

It has been shown that channelrhodopsin-2, a monolithic protein containing a light sensor and a cation channel, provides electrical stimulation of appropriate speed and magnitude to activate neuronal spike firing. Recently, photoinhibition, the inhibition of neural activity with light, has become feasible with the application of molecules such as the light-activated chloride pump halorhodopsin to neural control. Together, blue-light activated channelrhodopsin-2 and the yellow light-activated chloride pump halorhodopsin enable multiple-color, optical activation and silencing of neural activity. (See also Photobiomodulation)

== Methods ==
A caged protein is a protein that is activated in the presence of a stimulating light source. In most cases, photo-uncaging is the technique revealing the active region of a compound by the process of photolysis of the shielding molecule (‘cage’). However, uncaging the protein requires an appropriate wavelength, intensity, and timing of the light. Achieving this is possible due to the fact that the optical fiber may be modified to deliver specific amounts of light. In addition, short bursts of stimulation allow results similar to the physiological norm. The steps of photostimulation are time independent in that protein delivery and light activation can be done at different times. This is because the two steps are dependent on each other for activation of the protein.

Some proteins are innately photosensitive and function in the presence of light. Proteins known as opsins form the crux of the photosensitive proteins. These proteins are often found in the eye. In addition, many of these proteins function as ion channels and receptors. One example is when a certain wavelength of light is put onto certain channels, the blockage in the pore is relieved and allows ion transduction.

To uncage molecules, a photolysis system is required to cleave the covalent bond. An example system can consist of a light source (generally a laser or a lamp), a controller for the amount of light that enters, a guide for the light, and a delivery system. Often, the design function in such a way that a medium is met between the diffusing light that may cause additional, unwanted photolysis and light attenuation; both being significant problems with a photolysis system.

== History ==
The idea of photostimulation as a method of controlling biomolecule function was developed in the 1970s. Two researchers, Walther Stoeckenius and Dieter Oesterhelt discovered an ion pump known as bacteriorhodopsin which functions in the presence of light in 1971. In 1978, J.F. Hoffman invented the term “caging”. Unfortunately, this term caused some confusion among scientists due to the fact that the term is often used to describe a molecule which is trapped within another molecule. It could also be confused with the “caged effect” in the recombination of radicals. Therefore, some authors decided to use the term “light-activated” instead of “caging”. Both terms are currently in use. The first “caged molecule” synthesized by Hoffman et al. at Yale was the caged precursor to ATP derivative 1.

== Applications ==
Photostimulation is notable for its temporal precision, which may be used to obtain an accurate starting time of activation of caged effectors. In conjunction with caged inhibitors, the role of biomolecules at specific timepoints in an organism's lifecycle may be studied. A caged inhibitor of N-ethylmaleimide sensitive fusion protein (NSF), a key mediator of synaptic transmission, has been used to study the time dependency of NSF. Several other studies have effected action potential firing through use of caged neurotransmitters such as glutamate. Caged neurotransmitters, including photolable precursors of glutamate, dopamine, serotonin, and GABA, are commercially available.

Signaling during mitosis has been studied using reporter molecules with a caged fluorophore, which is not phosphorylated if photolysis has not occurred. The advantage of this technique is that it provides a “snapshot” of kinase activity at specific timepoints rather than recording all activity since the reporter's introduction.

Calcium ions play an important signaling role, and controlling their release with caged channels has been extensively studied.

Unfortunately, not all organisms produce or hold sufficient amounts of opsins. Thus, the opsin gene must be introduced to target neurons if they are not already present in the organism of study. The addition and expression of this gene is sufficient for the use of optogenetics. Possible means of achieving this include the construction of transgenic lines containing the gene or acute gene transfer to a specific area or region within an individual. These methods are known as germline transgenesis and somatic gene delivery, respectively.

Optogenetics has shown significant promise in the treatment of a series of neurological disorders such as Parkinson's disease and epilepsy. Optogenetics has the potential to facilitate the manipulation and targeting of specific cell types or neural circuits, characteristics that are lacking in current brain stimulation techniques like DBS. At this point, the use of optogenetics in treating neural diseases has only been practically implemented in the field of neurobiology to reveal more about the mechanisms of specific disorders. Before the technique can be implemented to directly treat these disorders developments in other related fields such as gene therapy, opsin engineering, and optoelectronics must also make certain developments.
