= D66 strain of Chlamydomonas reinhardtii =

Strain of alga

The D66 strain of Chlamydomonas reinhardtii, a single-celled green alga, is a cell-wall-deficient strain of C. reinhardtii that exhibits normal photosynthetic characteristics, but requires ammonia as a source of nitrogen for growth. This strain of green algae is becoming an increasingly popular research organism due to its potential to be used as a source of biofuels. The D66 strain's potential to produce clean and renewable biofuel has also made it an increasingly important topic in the field of conservation biology.

== Background ==
The D66 strain of Chlamydomonas reinhardtii has been genetically engineered with no cell wall in order to increase the strain's growth and photosynthesis rates. The technique of genetically engineering green algae to increase oil production for biofuels is becoming increasingly more prevalent around the United States. With factors such as high petroleum prices and growing environmental protection concerns, the need for clean and renewable energy sources is higher than ever. Energy corporations and the federal government are investing billions of dollars into green energy research and projects, and algal-based biofuels appear to be a viable energy source for the future. Furthermore, the D66 strain's growth and photosynthesis rates have proven to be higher than the rates of similar genetically engineered algae strains. This strain of algae could be a key factor in the future success of algal-based biofuels.

== Research ==
At Louisiana State University Dr. Naohiro Kato's research with the D66 strain is attempting to maximize oil production by changing growing conditions. The goal of the study is to find the D66 strain's optimal oil production conditions. Kato began his study by testing the effects of various amounts of Brefeldin A, a lactone antibiotic produced by fungal organisms, had on oil production over three-day growing periods. Kato then went on to test several factors influencing the algae's growing conditions, including: exclusion of nitrogen sources; adding hydrogen peroxide; adding tropomyosin; varying light conditions; and varying temperature. The results of these studies showed that the D66 strain produced the most oil under extreme stress.

The D66 strain of green algae is being researched in laboratories all over the United States. Universities such as the University of Arkansas and Arizona State University are conducting similar studies as those by Dr. Kato at Louisiana State University. Recently Biomedical Engineers have included the D66 strain in their research for HIV Antiretroviral Therapy Drugs.

== Future impacts ==
Studies show that, on paper, algal-based biofuels could completely replace petroleum as an energy source. It is estimated that 140.4 billion gallons of biofuel would have to be produced annually to do so. Current hurdles such as high production costs and the lack of facilities to mass-produce these biofuels has led to no algal-based biofuels being commercially distributed. However, high fuel prices and environmental concerns could make the need for algal-based biofuels, and in particular those produced from the highly efficient D66 strain, a legitimate energy source in the near future.

== Properties of D66 ==
The D66 (mating type +) strain has been used by a number of labs for the creation of Chlamydomonas mutant libraries. Because this strain lacks a wild-type cell wall, it is more efficiently transformed with exogenous DNA. However, one major problem with this strain is its inability to grow heterotrophically in the dark. Most wild-type Chlamydomonas strains can grow on fixed carbon sources (e.g., acetate) in the dark. It is possible that the D66 strain in impaired in acetate uptake or respiration, but the exact genetic explanation is unknown.

== See also ==
- Green algae
- Algae fuels
- Conservation biology
