= Edible algae vaccine =

Vaccination strategy being researched

Edible algae based vaccination is a vaccination strategy under preliminary research to combine a genetically engineered sub-unit vaccine and an immunologic adjuvant into Chlamydomonas reinhardtii microalgae. Microalgae can be freeze-dried and administered orally. While spirulina is accepted as safe to consume, edible algal vaccines remain under basic research with unconfirmed safety and efficacy as of 2018.

In 2003, the first documented algal-based vaccine antigen was reported, consisting of a foot-and-mouth disease antigen complexed with the cholera toxin subunit B, which delivered the antigen to digestion mucosal surfaces in mice. The vaccine was grown in C. reinhardtii algae and provided oral vaccination in mice, but was hindered by low vaccine antigen expression levels.

Proteins expressed inside the chloroplast of algae (the most common site of genetic engineering and protein production) do not undergo glycosylation, a form of posttranslational modification. Glycosylation of proteins that are not naturally modified like the malaria vaccine candidate pfs25 can occur in common expression systems like yeast.
