= Glutamate-sensitive fluorescent reporter =

A genetically engineered fluorescent protein that changes its fluorescence when bound to the neurotransmitter glutamate. Glutamate-sensitive fluorescent reporters (iGluSnFR, colloquially pronounced 'glue sniffer') are used to monitor the activity of presynaptic terminals by fluorescence microscopy. GluSnFRs are a class of optogenetic sensors used in neuroscience research. In brain tissue, two-photon microscopy is typically used to monitor GluSnFR fluorescence.

== Design ==
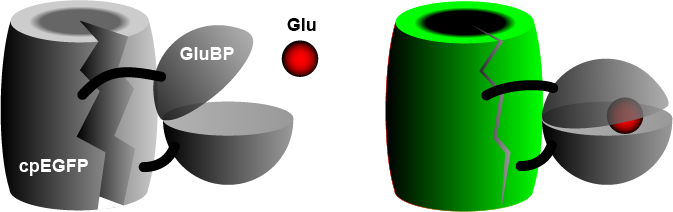

The widely used iGluSnFR consists of a circularly permuted enhanced green fluorescent protein (cpEGFP) fused to a glutamate binding protein (GluBP) from a bacterium. When GluBP binds a glutamate molecule, it changes its shape, pulling the EGFP barrel together, increasing fluorescence. A specific peptide segment (PDGFR) is included to bring the sensor to the outside of the cell membrane. In the more recent version by Aggarwal et al. (2022), researchers introduced iGluSnFR to two additional anchoring domains, a glycosylphostidylinositol (GPI) anchor, and a modified form of the cytosolic -cterminal domain of Stargazin with a PDZ ligand.

== History ==
The first genetically encoded fluorescent glutamate sensors (FLIPE, GluSnFR and SuperGluSnFR) were constructed by attaching cyan-fluorescent protein (CFP) and yellow-fluorescent protein (YFP) to a bacterial glutamate binding protein (GluBP). Glutamate binding changed the distance between CFP and YFP, changing the efficiency of energy transfer (FRET) between the two fluorophores. A breakthrough in visualizing glutamate release was achieved with iGluSnFR, a single-fluorophore glutamate sensor based on EGFP producing a ~5‑fold increase in fluorescence. To measure synaptic transmission at high frequencies, novel iGluSnFR variants with accelerated kinetics have recently been developed.
