= Halorhodopsin =

Family of transmembrane proteins

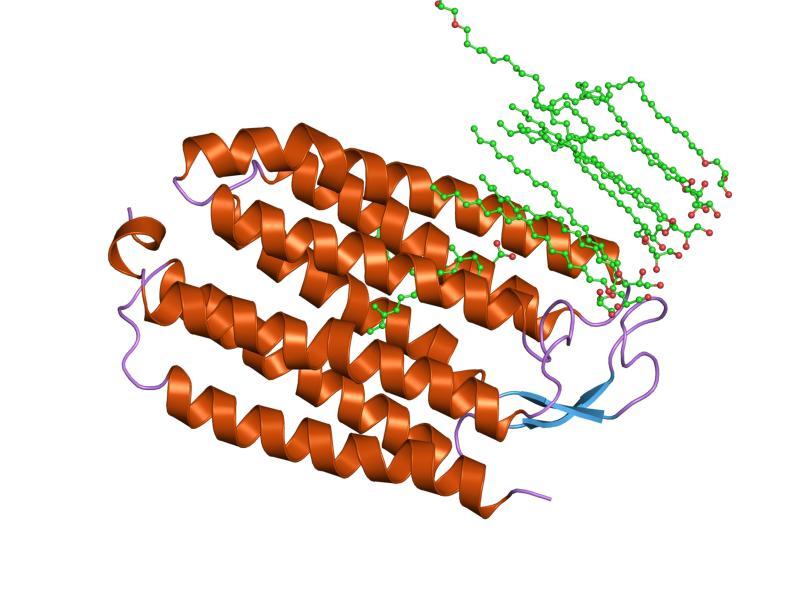
- Halorhodopsin Cartoon Visualization by Jawahar Swaminathan and MSD staff at the European Bioinformatics Institute

Identifiers
- Symbol: Bac_rhodopsin
- InterPro: CD15243
- SCOP2: 8071317 / SCOPe / SUPFAM
- TCDB: 3.E.1.2.2
- OPM superfamily: 6
- OPM protein: 76
Available protein structures:
- PDB: CD15243
- AlphaFold: CD15243

Halorhodopsin is a seven-transmembrane retinylidene protein from microbial rhodopsin family. It is a chloride-specific light-activated ion pump found in archaea known as halobacteria. It is activated by green light wavelengths of approximately 578 nm. Halorhodopsin also shares sequence similarity to channelrhodopsin, a light-gated ion channel.

Halorhodopsin contains the essential light-isomerizable vitamin A derivative all-trans-retinal. Due to the dedication towards discovering the structure and function of this molecule, halorhodopsin is one of the few membrane proteins whose crystal structure is known. Halorhodopsin uses the energy of green/yellow light to move chloride ions into the cell, overcoming the membrane potential. Beside chlorides it transports other halides and nitrates into the cell. Potassium chloride uptake by cells helps to maintain osmotic balance during cell growth. By performing the same task, light-driven anion pumps can considerably reduce the use of metabolic energy. Halorhodopsin has been the subject of much study and its structure is accurately known. Its properties are similar to those of bacteriorhodopsin, and these two light-driven ion pumps transport cations and anions in opposite directions.

Halorhodopsin isoforms can be found in multiple species of halobacteria, including Halobacterium salinarum and Natronobacterium pharaonis. Ongoing research is exploring these differences, and using them to parse apart the photocycle and pump properties. After bacteriorhodopsin, halorhodopsin may be the best-studied type I (microbial) opsin. The peak absorbance of the halorhodopsin retinal complex is about 570 nm.

Just as the blue-light activated ion channel channelrhodopsin-2 opens up the ability to activate excitable cells (such as neurons, muscle cells, pancreatic cells, and immune cells) with brief pulses of blue light, halorhodopsin opens up the ability to silence excitable cells with brief pulses of yellow light. Thus halorhodopsin and channelrhodopsin together enable multiple-color optical activation, silencing, and desynchronization of neural activity, creating a useful neuroengineering toolbox.

Halorhodopsin from Natronomonas (NpHR) has been used to achieve inhibition of action potentials in neurons in mammalian systems. Since light activation of NpHR leads to an influx of chloride ions which is a part of the natural process for generating hyperpolarization, NpHR induced inhibition works very well in neurons. Original NpHR channels when expressed in mammalian cells, showed a tendency to get accumulated in the endoplasmic reticulum of the cells. To overcome the sub-cellular localization issues, an ER export motif was added to the NpHR sequence. This modified NpHR (called eNpHR2.0) was utilized successfully to drive aggregate-free, high level expression of NpHR in vivo. However, even the modified form of NpHR showed poor localization at the cell membrane. To achieve higher membrane-localization it was further modified by addition of a golgi export signal and membrane trafficking signal from a potassium channel (Kir2.1). The addition of Kir2.1 signal significantly improved the membrane localization of NpHR and this engineered form of NpHR was labeled eNpHR3.0.

== History ==
Halorhodopsin was discovered in 1980 in Halobacterium salinarum, a salt-loving (halophilic) type of archaeon.

== Etymology ==
The name Halorhodopsin is of Greek origin, the halo- prefix emerging from ἅλς (háls) meaning "salt" or "sea". The suffix -rhodopsin originates from ῥόδον (rhódon, "rose"), due to its pinkish color, and ὄψις (ópsis, "sight").

== Structure ==
Halorhodopsin folds into a seven-transmembrane helix topology and has a similar tertiary structure (but not primary sequence structure) to vertebrate rhodopsins, the pigments that sense light in the retina.

== Applications ==
Halorhodopsin has been used in optogenetics to hyperpolarize (inhibit) specific neurons. Optogenetics has been proposed as therapeutic approach to neurological conditions for which current treatment methods are not always effective, including epilepsy and Parkinson's disease. NpHR has been used to inhibit excitatory neurons in the subthalamic nucleus of hemiparkinsonian rats, lesioned using the neurotoxin 6-OHDA.
