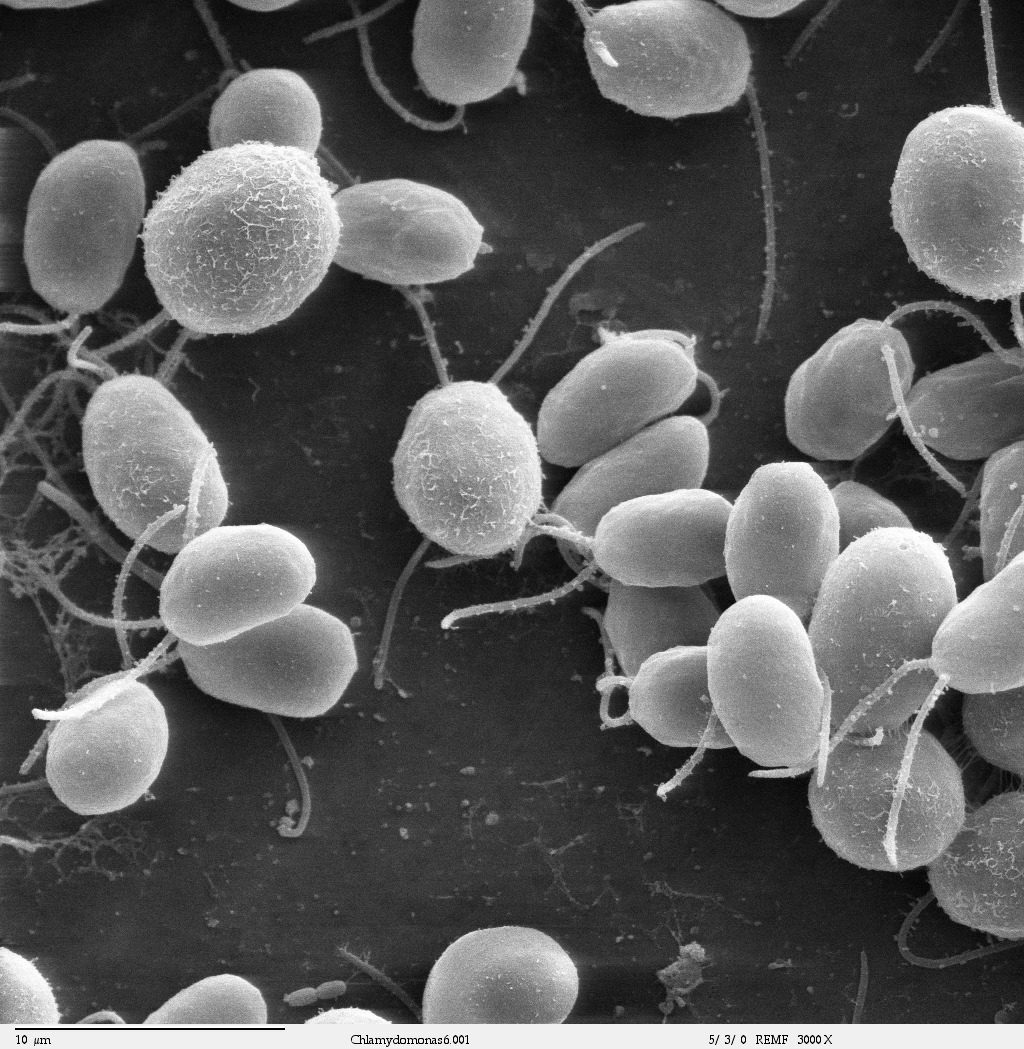

Scientific classification
- Domain: Eukaryota
- Supergroup: Archaeplastida
- Clade: Viridiplantae
- Division: Chlorophyta
- Class: Chlorophyceae
- Order: Chlamydomonadales
- Family: Chlamydomonadaceae
- Genus: Chlamydomonas
- Species: C. reinhardtii

Binomial name
- Chlamydomonas reinhardtii P.A.Dang.

= Chlamydomonas reinhardtii =

Species of alga

Chlamydomonas reinhardtii is a single-cell green alga about 10 micrometres in diameter that swims with two flagella. It has a cell wall made of hydroxyproline-rich glycoproteins, a large cup-shaped chloroplast, a large pyrenoid, and an eyespot apparatus that senses light.

Chlamydomonas species are widely distributed worldwide in soil and fresh water, of which Chlamydomonas reinhardtii is one of the most common and widespread. C. reinhardtii is an especially well studied biological model organism, partly due to its ease of culturing and the ability to manipulate its genetics. When illuminated, C. reinhardtii can grow photoautotrophically, but it can also grow in the dark if supplied with organic carbon. Commercially, C. reinhardtii is of interest for producing biopharmaceuticals and biofuel, as well being a valuable research tool in making hydrogen.

== History ==
The C. reinhardtii wild-type laboratory strain c137 (mt+) originates from an isolate collected near Amherst, Massachusetts, in 1945 by Gilbert M. Smith.

The genus Chlamydomonas was first described in 1838 by the German naturalist Christian Gottfried Ehrenberg, who documented unicellular green algae including Chlamydomonas and Volvox. Although these early descriptions were limited in detail, they represent the first formal classification of the genus. Later 19th-century studies identified key biological characteristics, including sexual reproduction and phototaxis. In 1888, the French botanist Pierre Dangeard renamed Chlamydomonas pulvisculus to Chlamydomonas reinhardtii in honor of the Ukrainian botanist Ludwig Reinhardt. Subsequent research in the late 19th and early 20th centuries established the organism as a useful model for studying reproduction and inheritance, including early demonstrations consistent with Mendelian segregation and the development of tetrad analysis. These studies contributed to the adoption of Chlamydomonas as a model organism in genetic and cellular research.

The species' name has been spelled several different ways because of different transliterations of the name from Russian: reinhardi, reinhardii, and reinhardtii all refer to the same species, C. reinhardtii Dangeard.

== Description ==
Cells of Chlamydomonas reinhardtii are mostly spherical, but can range from ellipsoidal, ovoid, obovoid, or asymmetrical. They are 10–22 μm long and 8–22 μm wide. The cell wall is thin, lacking a papilla. The flagella are 1.5 to 2 times the length of the cell body. Cells contain a single cup-shaped chloroplast lining the bottom of the cell, with a single basal pyrenoid.

=== Eye spot ===
C. reinhardtii has an eyespot apparatus similar to that of dinoflagellates. The eyespot is located near the cell equator. It is composed of a carotenoid-rich granule layer in the chloroplast which act like a light reflector. The main function of the eyespot is the phototaxis, which consist of the movement (with the flagella) related to a light stimulus. The phototaxis is crucial for the alga and allows for localization of the environment with optimal light conditions for photosynthesis. Phototaxis can be positive or negative depending on the light intensity. The phototactic pathway consists of four steps leading to a change in the beating balance between the two flagella (the cis-flagellum which is the one closest to the eyespot, and the trans-flagellum which is the one farthest from the eyespot).

== Model organism ==
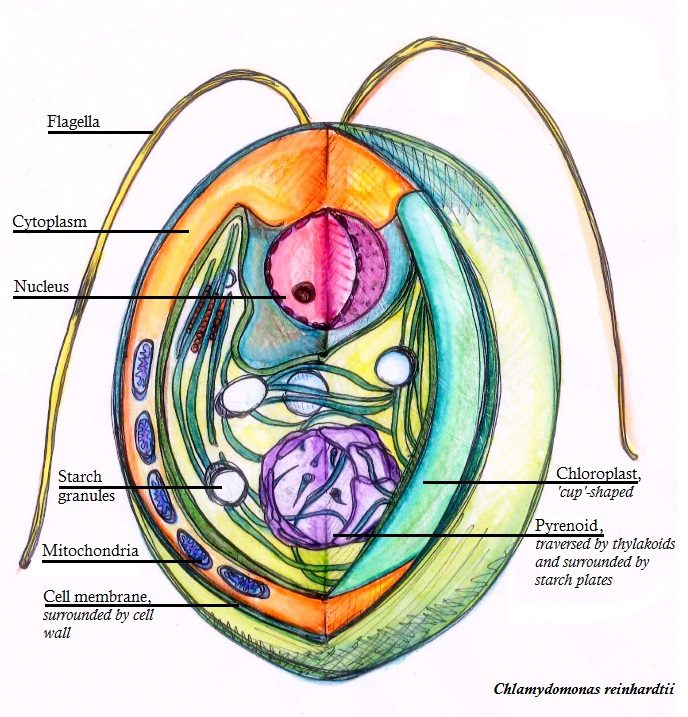
Cross section of a Chlamydomonas reinhardtii cell

Chlamydomonas is used as a model organism for research on fundamental questions in cell and molecular biology such as:

- How do cells move?
- How do cells respond to light?
- How do cells recognize one another?
- How do cells generate regular, repeatable flagellar waveforms?
- How do cells regulate their proteome to control flagellar length?
- How do cells respond to changes in mineral nutrition? (nitrogen, sulfur, etc.)

There are many known mutants of C. reinhardtii. These mutants are useful tools for studying a variety of biological processes, including flagellar motility, photosynthesis, and protein synthesis. Since Chlamydomonas species are normally haploid, the effects of mutations are seen immediately without further crosses.

In 2007, the complete nuclear genome sequence of C. reinhardtii was published.

Channelrhodopsin-1 and Channelrhodopsin-2, proteins that function as light-gated cation channels, were originally isolated from C. reinhardtii. These proteins and others like them are increasingly widely used in the field of optogenetics.

== Mitochondrial significance ==
The genome of C. reinhardtii is significant for mitochondrial study as it is one species where the genes for 6 of the 13 proteins encoded for the mitochondria are found in the nucleus of the cell, leaving 7 in the mitochondria. In species outside of Chlorophyceae, these genes are present only in the mitochondria and are unable to be allotopically expressed. This is significant for the testing and development of therapies for genetic mitochondrial diseases.

== Reproduction ==
Vegetative cells of reinhardtii species are haploid with 17 small chromosomes. Under nitrogen starvation, vegetative cells differentiate into haploid gametes. There are two mating types, identical in appearance, thus isogamous, and known as mt(+) and mt(-), which can fuse to form a diploid zygote. The zygote is not flagellated, and it serves as a dormant form of the species in the soil. In the light, the zygote undergoes meiosis and releases four flagellated haploid cells that resume the vegetative lifecycle.

Under ideal growth conditions, cells may sometimes undergo two or three rounds of mitosis before the daughter cells are released from the old cell wall into the medium. Thus, a single growth step may result in 4 or 8 daughter cells per mother cell.

The cell cycle of this unicellular green algae can be synchronized by alternating periods of light and dark. The growth phase is dependent on light, whereas, after a point designated as the transition or commitment point, processes are light-independent.

== Interactions with viruses ==
In 2025, it was reported that the genome of the strain C. reinhardtii CC2937 contains an endogenous giant virus integrated into chromosome 15. At the time, no other viruses of C. reinhardtii had been described. The virus was named Punuivirus, after Puñui, the Incan god of sleep. Punuivirus has a large genome length of over 600 kbp, and therefore represents the largest latent virus discovered as of the time of publication, and the first latent giant virus in a single celled eukaryote. Punuivirus belongs to the viral family Allomimiviridae, and viruses in this family have also been found integrated into the genomes of a wide range of other green algae .

== Genetics ==
The attractiveness of the algae as a model organism has recently increased with the release of several genomic resources to the public domain. The Chlre3 draft of the Chlamydomonas nuclear genome sequence prepared by Joint Genome Institute of the U.S. Dept of Energy comprises 1557 scaffolds totaling 120 Mb. Roughly half of the genome is contained in 24 scaffolds all at least 1.6 Mb in length. The current assembly of the nuclear genome is available online.

The ~15.8 Kb mitochondrial genome (database accession: NC_001638) is available online at the NCBI database. The complete ~203.8 Kb chloroplast genome (database accession: NC_005353) is available online.

In addition to genomic sequence data, there is a large supply of expression sequence data available as cDNA libraries and expressed sequence tags (ESTs). Seven cDNA libraries are available online. A BAC library can be purchased from the Clemson University Genomics Institute. There are also two databases of >50 000 and >160 000 ESTs available online.

A genome-wide collection of mutants with mapped insertion sites covering most nuclear genes is available: https://www.chlamylibrary.org/.

The genome of C. reinhardtii has been shown to contain N^{6}-Methyladenosine (m^{6}A), a mark common in prokaryotes but much rarer in eukaryotes. Some research has indicated that 6mA in Chlamydomonas may be involved in nucleosome positioning, as it is present in the linker regions between nucleosomes as well as near the transcription start sites of actively transcribed genes.

C. reinhardtii appears to be capable of several DNA repair processes. These include recombinational repair, strand break repair and excision repair. In particular, C. reinhardtii chloroplasts possess an efficient system for repairing DNA double-strand breaks. In chloroplast DNA homologous recombinational repair is strongly stimulated by double-strand breaks.

== Experimental evolution ==
Chlamydomonas has been used to study different aspects of evolutionary biology and ecology. It is an organism of choice for many selection experiments because :-

1. it has a short generation time,
2. it is both an autotroph and a facultative heterotroph,
3. it can reproduce both sexually and asexually, and
4. there is a wealth of genetic information already available.

Some examples (nonexhaustive) of evolutionary work done with Chlamydomonas include the evolution of sexual reproduction, the fitness effect of mutations, and the effect of adaptation to different levels of CO_{2}.

According to one frequently cited theoretical hypothesis, sexual reproduction (in contrast to asexual reproduction) is adaptively maintained in benign environments because it reduces mutational load by combining deleterious mutations from different lines of descent and increases mean fitness. However, in a long-term experimental study of C. reinhardtii, evidence was obtained that contradicted this hypothesis. In sexual populations, mutation clearance was not found to occur and fitness was not found to increase.

== Motion ==
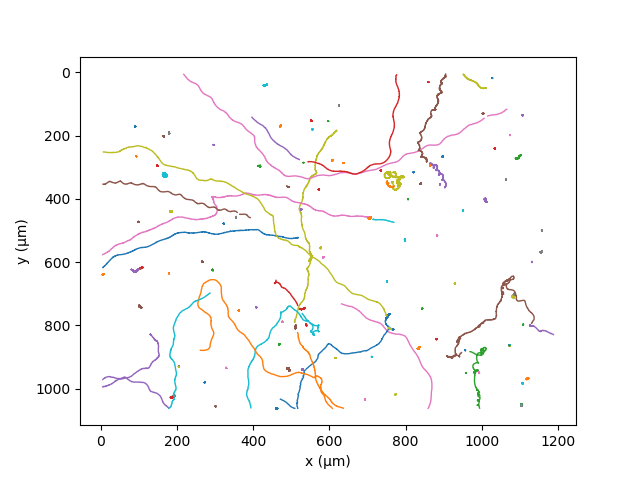
C. reinhardtii trajectory, in HSA (culture medium), under red light.

C. reinhardtii swims thanks to its two flagella, in a movement analogous to human breaststroke. Repeating this elementary movement 50 times per second the algae have a mean velocity of 70 μm/s; the genetic diversity of the different strains results in a huge range of values for this quantity. After few seconds of run, an asynchronous beating of the two flagella leads to a random change of direction, a movement called "run and tumble". At a larger time and space scale, the random movement of the alga can be described as an active diffusion phenomenon. Environmental factors such as ambient temperature influence swimming behavior, with higher temperatures leading to flagellar shortening and reduced swimming speeds within minutes.

== DNA transformation techniques ==
Genetic transformation in C. reinhardtii differs between cellular compartments: chloroplast transformation occurs mainly through homologous recombination, whereas nuclear transformation typically involves non-homologous recombination.

DNA can be introduced into the chloroplast by microprojectile bombardment or glass bead agitation. Biolistic delivery is generally more efficient, likely because the large chloroplast occupies over half of the cell volume and therefore represents a relatively large target for biolistic delivery.

For nuclear transformation, both glass bead agitation and electroporation have been used, with electroporation reported to produce transformation frequencies up to two orders of magnitude higher than the glass bead method.

== Practical uses ==
=== Production of biopharmaceuticals ===
Genetically engineered C. reinhardtii has been used to produce a mammalian serum amyloid protein (needs citation), a human antibody protein (needs citation), human Vascular endothelial growth factor, a potential therapeutic Human Papillomavirus 16 vaccine, a potential malaria vaccine (an edible algae vaccine), and a complex designer drug that could be used to treat cancer.

=== Alternative protein source ===
C. reinhardtii has been suggested as a new algae-based nutritional source. Compared to Chlorella and Spirulina, C. reinhardtii was found to have more Alpha-linolenic acid, and a lower quantity of heavy metals while also containing all the essential amino acids and similar protein content. Triton Algae Innovations was developing a commercial alternative protein product made from C reinhardtii.

=== Clean source of hydrogen production ===
In 1939, the German researcher Hans Gaffron (1902–1979), who was at that time attached to the University of Chicago, discovered the hydrogen metabolism of unicellular green algae. C reinhardtii and some other green algae can, under specified circumstances, stop producing oxygen and convert instead to the production of hydrogen. This reaction by hydrogenase, an enzyme active only in the absence of oxygen, is short-lived. Over the next thirty years, Gaffron and his team worked out the basic mechanics of this photosynthetic hydrogen production by algae.

The circumstances in which these algae switch to producing hydrogen instead of oxygen are the lack of sulfur.

To increase the production of hydrogen, several tracks are being followed by the researchers.

- The first track is decoupling hydrogenase from photosynthesis. This way, oxygen accumulation can no longer inhibit the production of hydrogen. And, if one goes one step further by changing the structure of the enzyme hydrogenase, it becomes possible to render hydrogenase insensitive to oxygen. This makes a continuous production of hydrogen possible. In this case, the flux of electrons needed for this production no longer comes from the production of sugars but is drawn from the breakdown of its own stock of starch.
- A second track is to interrupt temporarily, through genetic manipulation of hydrogenase, the photosynthesis process. This inhibits oxygen's reaching a level where it is able to stop the production of hydrogen.
- The third track, mainly investigated by researchers in the 1950s, is chemical or mechanical methods of removal of O2 produced by the photosynthetic activity of the algal cells. These have included the addition of O2 scavengers, the use of added reductants, and purging the cultures with inert gases. However, these methods are not inherently scalable, and may not be applicable to applied systems. New research has appeared on the subject of removing oxygen from algae cultures, and may eliminate scaling problems.
- The fourth track has been investigated, namely using copper salts to decouple hydrogenase action from oxygen production.
- The fifth track has been suggested to reroute the photosynthetic electron flow from CO_{2} fixation in Calvin cycle to hydrogenase by applying short light pulses to anaerobic algae or by depleting the culture of CO_{2}. Under pulse-illumination conditions, algae produce H_{2} via the most efficient mechanism of direct water biophotolysis, proceeding in two distinct steps:

1. Photosystem II-dependent water oxidation reaction:
   2H2O → 4H+ + O2 + 4e⁻;

2. Hydrogenase-dependent reversible reduction of protons to molecular hydrogen:
   4H+ + 4e⁻ ⇄ 2H2.

If the water oxidation reaction leading to O_{2} production is balanced with O_{2} consumption, either by respiration or by introducing additional O_{2} absorbents or scavengers, the photosynthetic production of H_{2} can be sustained for a prolonged period. This balance prevents the inhibition of hydrogenase activity by accumulated O_{2}, ensuring steady hydrogen production under these optimized conditions.

== See also ==
- Protist locomotion#Biohybrid microswimmers
- D66 strain of Chlamydomonas reinhardtii
