= Ontogenetic depth =

Pseudoscientific concept

Ontogenetic depth is a pseudoscientific idea proposed in February 2003 by Paul Nelson, an American philosopher of science, young Earth creationist and intelligent design advocate; he is employed by the Discovery Institute.

Basically, Nelson concludes in his 'hypothesis' that developmental complexity is unbreakable, and that if he shows Cambrian organisms to be complex, then it is therefore impossible for them to have evolved. Nelson proposes 'ontogenetic depth' as evidence of specified complexity, and a reliable marker of design by an intelligent agent, in opposition to modern evolutionary theory.

Nelson subsequently stated that ontogenetic depth is "Currently Impossible to Measure".

== Criticism ==
Biologist PZ Myers, who works in the field of evolutionary developmental biology, dismissed the concept, stating in 2010 that "Nelson is a creationist who made up this wacky claim of "ontogenetic depth", saying he had a way of objectively measuring the complexity of the developmental process in organisms with a number that described the distance from egg to adult. Unfortunately, he forgot to tell us how one calculated this number, or how it actually accounted for the complexity of a network, or even how we'd get a number that was different for a sponge and a cat. But he did say he'd get back to us with the details tomorrow...six years ago." Myers concludes that "ontogenetic depth is a sloppily-defined concept with no theoretical support for its validity and no apparent operational utility."

The concept of 'ontogenetic depth' has not been published in any peer-reviewed journal, there are no methods described that would allow to measure this value in any organisms, nobody other than Nelson and his collaborator, Marcus Ross, do anything with the idea.
