= Photoactivated adenylyl cyclase =

Class of proteins

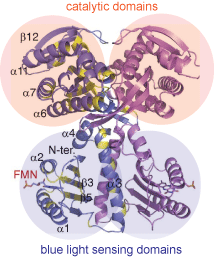
Structure of the photoactivated adenylyl cyclase OaPAC forming a homodimer. FMN: flavin mononucleotide, the light-absorbing pigment.

Photoactivated adenylyl cyclase (PAC) is a protein consisting of an adenylyl cyclase enzyme domain directly linked to a BLUF (blue light receptor using FAD) type light sensor domain. When illuminated with blue light, the enzyme domain becomes active and converts ATP to cAMP, an important second messenger in many cells. In the unicellular flagellate Euglena gracilis, PACα and PACβ (euPACs) serve as a photoreceptor complex that senses light for photophobic responses and phototaxis. Small but potent PACs were identified in the genome of the bacteria Beggiatoa (bPAC) and Oscillatoria acuminata (OaPAC). While natural bPAC has some enzymatic activity in the absence of light, variants with no dark activity have been engineered (PACmn).

== Use of PACs as optogenetic tools ==
As PACs consist of a light sensor and an enzyme in a single protein, they can be expressed in other species and cell types to manipulate cAMP levels with light. When bPAC is expressed in mouse sperm, blue light illumination speeds up the swimming of transgenic sperm cells and aids fertilization. When expressed in neurons, illumination changes the branching pattern of growing axons, as well as to induce axon regeneration in vivo. PAC has been used in mice to clarify the function of neurons in the hypothalamus, which use cAMP signaling to control mating behavior. Expression of PAC together with K^{+}-specific cyclic-nucleotide-gated ion channels (CNGs) has been used to hyperpolarize neurons at very low light levels, which prevents them from firing action potentials.

== Rhodopsin guanylyl cyclases ==
Photoactivated guanylyl cyclases have been discovered in the aquatic fungi Blastocladiella emersonii and Catenaria anguillulae. Unlike PACs, these light-activated cyclases use retinal as their light sensor and are therefore rhodopsin guanylyl cyclases (RhGC). When expressed in Xenopus oocytes or mammalian neurons, RhGCs generate cGMP in response to green light. Therefore, they are considered useful optogenetic tools to investigate cGMP signaling.
