= Channelrhodopsin =

Class of transport proteins

Channelrhodopsins are a subfamily of retinylidene proteins (rhodopsins) that function as light-gated ion channels. They serve as sensory photoreceptors in unicellular green algae, controlling phototaxis: movement in response to light. Expressed in cells of other organisms, they enable light to control electrical excitability, intracellular acidity, calcium influx, and other cellular processes (see optogenetics). Channelrhodopsin-1 (ChR1) and Channelrhodopsin-2 (ChR2) from the model organism Chlamydomonas reinhardtii are the first discovered channelrhodopsins. Variants that are sensitive to different colors of light or selective for specific ions (ACRs, KCRs) have been cloned from other species of algae and protists.

== History ==
Phototaxis and photoorientation of microalgae have been studied over more than a hundred years in many laboratories worldwide. In 1980, Ken Foster developed the first consistent theory about the functionality of algal eyes. He also analyzed published action spectra and complemented blind cells with retinal and retinal analogues, which led to the conclusion that the photoreceptor for motility responses in Chlorophyceae is rhodopsin.

Photocurrents of the Chlorophyceae Haematococcus pluvialis and Chlamydomonas reinhardtii were studied over many years in the groups of Oleg Sineshchekov and Peter Hegemann. Based on action spectroscopy and simultaneous recordings of photocurrents and flagellar beating, it was determined that the photoreceptor currents and subsequent flagellar movements are mediated by rhodopsin and control phototaxis and photophobic responses. The extremely fast rise of the photoreceptor current after a brief light flash led to the conclusion that the rhodopsin and the channel are intimately linked in a protein complex, or even within one single protein.

The name "channelrhodopsin" was coined to highlight this unusual property, and the sequences were renamed accordingly. The nucleotide sequences of the rhodopsins now called channelrhodopsins ChR1 and ChR2 were finally uncovered in a large-scale EST sequencing project in C. reinhardtii. Independent submission of the same sequences to GenBank by three research groups generated confusion about their naming: The names cop-3 and cop-4 were used for initial submission by Hegemann's group; csoA and csoB by Spudich's group; and acop-1 and acop-2 by Takahashi's group. Both sequences were found to function as single-component light-activated cation channels in a Xenopus oocytes and human kidney cells (HEK).

Their roles in generation of photoreceptor currents in algal cells were characterized by Oleg Sineshchekov, Kwang-Hwan Jung and John Spudich, and Peter Berthold and Peter Hegemann, the latter of whom to become a one of the three winners of the 2026 Nobel Prize in Physiology or Medicine (along with Karl Deisseroth and Georg Nagel).

== Structure ==
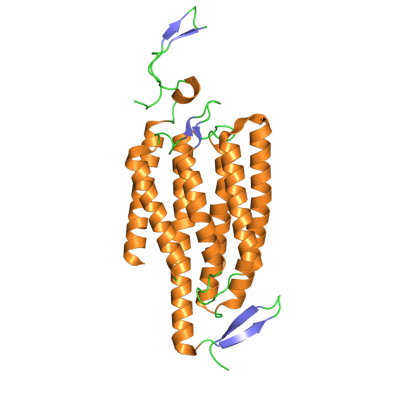
Crystal structure of channelrhodopsin. PDB 3ug9

In terms of structure, channelrhodopsins are retinylidene proteins. They are seven-transmembrane proteins like rhodopsin, and contain the light-isomerizable chromophore all-trans-retinal (an aldehyde derivative of vitamin A). The retinal chromophore is covalently linked to the rest of the protein through a protonated Schiff base. Whereas most 7-transmembrane proteins are G protein-coupled receptors that open other ion channels indirectly via second messengers (i.e., they are metabotropic), channelrhodopsins directly form ion channels (i.e., they are ionotropic). This makes cellular depolarization extremely fast, robust, and useful for bioengineering and neuroscience applications, including photostimulation.

== Function ==
The natural ("wild-type") ChR2 absorbs blue light with an absorption and action spectrum maximum at 480 nm. When the all-trans-retinal complex absorbs a photon, it induces a conformational change from all-trans to 13-cis-retinal. This change introduces a further one in the transmembrane protein, opening the pore to at least 6 Å. Within milliseconds, the retinal relaxes back to the all-trans form, closing the pore and stopping the flow of ions. Most natural channelrhodopsins are nonspecific cation channels (CCRs), conducting H^{+}, Na^{+}, K^{+}, and Ca^{2+} ions. Anion-conducting channelrhodopsins (ACRs) and potassium-selective channelrhodopsins (HcKCR1, HcKCR2) were structurally analyzed to understand their ion selectivity. ACRs and KCRs have been used to inhibit neuronal activity. Recently discovered viral channelrhodopsins (VCR1) are localized to the membrane of the endoplasmic reticulum and lead to calcium release when illuminated.

== Development as a molecular tool ==
In 2005, three groups sequentially established ChR2 as a tool for genetically targeted optical remote control (optogenetics) of neurons, neural circuits and behavior.

At first, Karl Deisseroth's lab demonstrated that ChR2 could be deployed to control mammalian neurons in vitro, achieving temporal precision on the order of milliseconds (both in terms of delay to spiking and in terms of temporal jitter). Because all opsins require retinal as the light-sensing co-factor, it was unclear whether central mammalian nerve cells would contain sufficient retinal levels; however, they do. It also showed, despite the small single-channel conductance, sufficient potency to drive mammalian neurons above action potential threshold. From this, channelrhodopsin became the first optogenetic tool, with which neural activity could be controlled with the temporal precision at which neurons operate (milliseconds). A second study was published later confirming the ability of ChR2 to control the activity of vertebrate neurons, at this time in the chick spinal cord. This study was the first wherein ChR2 was expressed alongside an optical silencer, vertebrate rhodopsin-4 in this case, demonstrating for the first time that excitable cells could be activated and silenced using these two tools simultaneously, illuminating the tissue at different wavelengths.

It was demonstrated that ChR2, if expressed in specific neurons or muscle cells, can evoke predictable behaviors, i.e. can control the nervous system of an intact animal, in this case the invertebrate C. elegans. This was the first using ChR2 to steer the behavior of an animal in an optogenetic experiment, rendering a genetically specified cell type subject to optical remote control. Although both aspects had been illustrated earlier that year by the group of Gero Miesenböck, deploying the indirectly light-gated ion channel P2X2, it was henceforth microbial opsins like channelrhodopsin that dominated the field of genetically targeted remote control of excitable cells, due to the power, speed, targetability, ease of use, and temporal precision of direct optical activation, not requiring any external chemical compound such as caged ligands.

To overcome its principal downsides – the small single-channel conductance (especially in steady-state), the limitation to one optimal excitation wavelength (~470 nm, blue) as well as the relatively long recovery time, not permitting controlled firing of neurons above 20–40 Hz – ChR2 has been optimized using genetic engineering. A point mutation H134R (exchanging the amino acid Histidine in position 134 of the native protein for an Arginine) resulted in increased steady-state conductance, as described in a 2005 paper that also established ChR2 as an optogenetic tool in C. elegans. In 2009, Roger Tsien's lab optimized ChR2 for further increases in steady-state conductance and dramatically reduced desensitization by creating chimeras of ChR1 and ChR2 and mutating specific amino acids, yielding ChEF and ChIEF, which allowed the driving of trains of action potentials up to 100 Hz. In 2010, the groups of Hegemann and Deisseroth introduced an E123T mutation into native ChR2, yielding ChETA, which has faster on- and off-kinetics, permitting the control of individual action potentials at frequencies up to 200 Hz (in appropriate cell types).

The groups of Hegemann and Deisseroth also discovered that the introduction of the point mutation C128S makes the resulting ChR2-derivative a step-function tool: Once "switched on" by blue light, ChR2(C128S) stays in the open state until it is switched off by yellow light – a modification that deteriorates temporal precision, but increases light sensitivity by two orders of magnitude. They also discovered and characterized VChR1 in the multicellular algae Volvox carteri. VChR1 produces only tiny photocurrents, but with an absorption spectrum that is red-shifted relative to ChR2. Using parts of the ChR1 sequence, photocurrent amplitude was later improved to allow excitation of two neuronal populations at two distinct wavelengths.

Deisseroth's group has pioneered many applications in live animals such as genetically targeted remote control in rodents in vivo, the optogenetic induction of learning in rodents, the experimental treatment of Parkinson's disease in rats, and the combination with fMRI (opto-fMRI). Other labs have pioneered the combination of ChR2 stimulation with calcium imaging for all-optical experiments, mapping of long-range and local neural circuits, ChR2 expression from a transgenic locus – directly or in the Cre-lox conditional paradigm – as well as the two-photon excitation of ChR2, permitting the activation of individual cells.

In March 2013, the Brain Prize (Grete Lundbeck European Brain Research Prize) was jointly awarded to Bamberg, Boyden, Deisseroth, Hegemann, Miesenböck, and Nagel for "their invention and refinement of optogenetics". The same year, Hegemann and Nagel received the Louis-Jeantet Prize for Medicine for "the discovery of channelrhodopsin". In 2015, Boyden and Deisseroth received the Breakthrough Prize in Life Sciences and in 2020, Miesenböck, Hegemann and Nagel received the Shaw prize in Life Science and Medicine for the development of optogenetics.

== Designer-channelrhodopsins ==
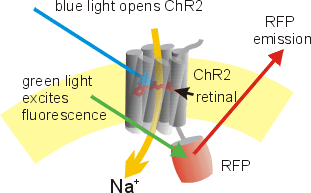
Scheme of ChR2-RFP fusion construct

Channelrhodopsins are key tools in optogenetics. The C-terminal end of Channelrhodopsin-2 extends into the intracellular space and can be replaced by fluorescent proteins without affecting channel function. This kind of fusion construct can be useful to visualize the morphology of ChR2 expressing cells, i.e. simultaneously indicate which cells are tagged with FP and allow the activity to be controlled by the channelrhodopsin. Point mutations close to the retinal binding pocket have been shown to affect the biophysical properties of the channelrhodopsin, resulting in a variety of different tools.

=== Kinetics ===
Closing of the channel after optical activation can be substantially delayed by mutating the protein residues C128 or D156. This modification results in super-sensitive channelrhodopsins that can be opened by a blue light pulse and closed by a green or yellow light pulse (Step-function opsins). Mutating the E123 residue accelerates channel kinetics (ChETA), and the resulting ChR2 mutants have been used to spike neurons at up to 200 Hz. In general, channelrhodopsins with slow kinetics are more light-sensitive on the population level, as open channels accumulate over time even at low light levels.

=== Photocurrent amplitude ===
H134R and T159C mutants display increased photocurrents, and a combination of T159 and E123 (ET/TC) has slightly larger photocurrents and slightly faster kinetics than wild-type ChR2. ChIEF, a chimera and point mutant of ChR1 and ChR2, demonstrates large photocurrents, little desensitization and kinetics similar to wild-type ChR2. Variants with extended open time (ChR2-XXL) produce extremely large photocurrents and are very light sensitive on the population level.

=== Wavelength ===
Chimeric channelrhodopsins have been developed by combining transmembrane helices from ChR1 and VChR1, leading to the development of ChRs with red spectral shifts (such as C1V1 and ReaChR). ReaChR has improved membrane trafficking and strong expression in mammalian cells, and has been used for minimally invasive, transcranial activation of brainstem motoneurons. Searches for homologous sequences in other organisms has yielded spectrally improved and stronger red-shifted channelrhodopsins (Chrimson). In combination with ChR2, these yellow/red light-sensitive channelrhodopsins allow controlling two populations of neurons independently with light pulses of different colors.

A blue-shifted channelrhodopsin has been discovered in the alga Scherffelia dubia. After some engineering to improve membrane trafficking and speed, the resulting tool (CheRiff) produced large photocurrents at 460 nm excitation. It has been combined with the Genetically Encoded Calcium Indicator jRCaMP1b in an all-optical system called the OptoCaMP.

=== Ion selectivity ===
Most channelrhodopsins are unspecific cation channels. When expressed in neurons, they conduct mostly Na^{+} ions and are therefore depolarizing (excitatory). Variants with moderate to high calcium permeability have been engineered (CatCh, CapChRs). K^{+}-specific channelrhodopsins (KCRs, WiChR) were recently discovered in various protists. When expressed in neurons, potassium-selective channelrhodopsins hyperpolarize the membrane upon illumination, preventing spike generation (inhibitory).

Mutating E90 to the positively charged amino acid arginine turns channelrhodopsin from an unspecific cation channel into a chloride-conducting channel (ChloC). The selectivity for Cl- was further improved by replacing negatively charged residues in the channel pore, making the reversal potential more negative. Anion-conducting channelrhodopsins (iChloC, iC++, GtACR) inhibit neuronal spiking in cell culture and in intact animals when illuminated with blue light. Calcium-selective channelrhodopsins have been engineered to activate calcium-dependent enzymes in cells.

== Applications ==
Channelrhodopsins can be readily expressed in excitable cells such as neurons using a variety of transfection techniques (viral transfection, electroporation, gene gun) or transgenic animals. The light-absorbing pigment retinal is present in most cells (of vertebrates) as vitamin A, making it possible to photostimulate neurons without adding any chemical compounds. Before the discovery of channelrhodopsins, neuroscientists were limited to recording the activity of neurons in the brain and correlate this activity with behavior. This is not sufficient to prove that the recorded neural activity actually caused that behavior. Controlling networks of genetically modified cells with light, an emerging field known as Optogenetics., allows researchers now to explore the causal link between activity in a specific group of neurons and mental events, e.g. decision making. Optical control of behavior has been demonstrated in nematodes, fruit flies, zebrafish, and mice. Recently, chloride-conducting channelrhodopsins have been engineered and were also found in nature. These tools can be used to silence neurons in cell culture and in live animals by shunting inhibition.

Using multiple colors of light expands the possibilities of optogenetic experiments. The blue-light sensitive ChR2 and the yellow light-activated chloride pump halorhodopsin together enable multiple-color optical activation and silencing of neural activity. Another interesting pair is the blue-light sensitive chloride channel GtACR2 and the red-light sensitive cation channel Chrimson which have been combined in a single protein (BiPOLES) for bidirectional control of membrane potential.

Using fluorescently labeled ChR2, light-stimulated axons and synapses can be identified. This is useful to study the molecular events during the induction of synaptic plasticity. Transfected cultured neuronal networks can be stimulated to perform some desired behaviors for applications in robotics and control. ChR2 has also been used to map long-range connections from one side of the brain to the other, and to map the spatial location of inputs on the dendritic tree of individual neurons.

In 2006, it was reported that transfection with Channelrhodopsin could restore eyesight to blind mice.

Neurons can tolerate ChR expression for a long time, and several laboratories are testing optogenetic stimulation to solve medical needs. In blind mice, visual function can be partially restored by expressing ChR2 in inner retinal cells. In 2021, the red-light sensitive ChR ChrimsonR was virally delivered to the eyes of a human patient suffering from retinal degeneration (retinitis pigmentosa), leading to partial recovery of his vision. Optical cochlear implants have been shown to work well in animal experiments and are currently undergoing clinical trials. In the future, ChRs may find even more medical applications, e.g. for deep-brain stimulation of Parkinson patients or to control certain forms of epilepsy.
