= Shunting inhibition =

Form of synaptic inhibition mediated by increased membrane conductance

Shunting inhibition is a form of synaptic inhibition in which activation of typically GABA_{A} (or glycine) receptors increases a neuron’s membrane conductance, which can decrease input resistance and the membrane time constant, causing coincident excitatory currents to be “shunted” but not necessarily hyperpolarized. Shunting can occur even when GABA is depolarizing (relative to resting) because conductance increases reduce the voltage response to excitatory input. In the cortex, rapid and strong forms of shunting can influence synaptic integration and spike timing.

Shunting inhibition is often discussed in terms of changes in neuronal gain and the arithmetic of dendritic integration. Outcomes depend on timing of presynaptic inputs, reversal potential, background synaptic activity, and dendritic location. It is not yet clear if shunting is always divisive, and some results suggest divisive effects can be lost or state-dependent. From a network perspective, shunting inhibition can promote rhythmic and stabilized activity (e.g., gamma-band oscillations in hippocampus). Conductance-based dissection often estimates synaptic currents from membrane potential measurements.

Animation of a shunting inhibition experiment using combined voltage imaging and local GABA photorelease (Vogt et al., 2011).

== Background ==
Inhibition in the nervous system is the reduction of a neuron’s ability to fire an action potential, either entirely or by limiting the rate at which it can fire. Traditionally, inhibition is described as hyperpolarizing a neuron’s membrane, making it more difficult to depolarize to spike threshold. Shunting inhibition provides an alternate mechanism in which activation of GABA (or glycine) receptors increases membrane conductance, thereby lowering input resistance and shortening time constants; as a result, the same current input produces a smaller change in voltage (“shunting”).

The effects of reduced input resistance can be described by Ohm's law: $\Delta V = I R$, where voltage change is proportional to current and resistance. When GABA receptors are activated, chloride ions can permeate the membrane and increase overall conductance. Postsynaptic currents can therefore generate smaller and quicker changes in membrane potential, reducing excitability. If the reversal potential of an inhibitory synapse is below spike threshold, it can remain effective even when GABA_{A} currents are depolarized relative to resting potential, because the added conductance reduces voltage gain.

Where and when shunting happens can matter greatly. Dendritic placement can produce local reductions in excitability and alter how strongly a branch influences somatic spiking. Shunting can also adjust the input/output gain of a neuron, in ways that may appear divisive, subtractive, or mixed depending on conditions.

== Historical background ==
In 1953, Paul Fatt and Bernard Katz described inhibitory impulses decreasing membrane resistance and reducing excitatory responses in crustacean muscle fibers, providing early evidence that inhibition could act via increased leak rather than hyperpolarization.

In 1992, recordings from dentate granule cells showed that GABA_{A} currents could be depolarizing relative to resting potential while still inhibiting through shunting, emphasizing the role of reversal potential relative to spike threshold and the conductance increase itself.

In 1997, modeling work argued that adding inhibitory conductance does not always produce a purely divisive effect, with outcomes depending on cellular properties, spike-generation dynamics, and input statistics. Subsequent work under realistic synaptic backgrounds reported both divisive and subtractive-like effects.

In 1998, intracellular recordings in cat visual cortex linked transient increases in inhibitory conductance to sensory processing and shunting of excitatory summation. Related work in auditory cortex helped motivate how inhibition can sharpen timing without requiring large hyperpolarizations.

== Biophysical basis ==
Shunting inhibition occurs when membrane conductivity increases in response to inhibitory synapses opening ion channels (commonly GABA_{A} or glycine receptors). In a more conductive membrane, the same excitatory current produces a smaller and briefer voltage change due to reduced input resistance and a shorter membrane time constant; some excitatory current is effectively lost through the increased inhibitory conductance.

=== Time constant, input resistance, and conductance increase ===
As described by $\Delta V = I R$, the voltage change produced by a synaptic current is reduced by mechanisms that lower input resistance. Opening GABA_{A} or glycine channels adds conductance in parallel with leak conductance, reducing input resistance and shortening the membrane time constant $\tau_m = R_{in} C_m$. A shorter $\tau_m$ narrows the time window for temporal summation of excitatory postsynaptic potentials (EPSPs), and lower $R_{in}$ reduces EPSP amplitudes.

=== GABA_{A} and glycine receptors ===
Fast shunting inhibition in vertebrates is primarily mediated by ionotropic GABA_{A} and glycine receptors. These ligand-gated anion channels increase membrane conductance (often dominated by chloride), which lowers input resistance and shortens the membrane time constant. Inhibitory efficacy depends on the chloride reversal potential relative to spike threshold. For example, depolarizing GABA_{A} conductances in dentate granule cells can still reduce spiking probability by shunting coactive excitation. Similar logic has been used to explain cases where GABA_{A} appears excitatory at the soma yet suppresses spiking by clamping responsiveness through added conductance. These principles also apply to glycine receptor-mediated shunting in regions where glycinergic inhibition is prominent.

Additional examples of fast feed-forward inhibition and sensory integration mechanisms frequently discussed in this context include somatic feed-forward inhibition in pyramidal cells and thalamocortical feed-forward inhibition.

=== Dendritic location and compartmentalization ===
Inhibitory synapse location can shape its effects. Increasing conductance on a dendritic branch can locally clamp driving force for nearby excitation and modify how strongly that branch influences somatic spiking. Branch geometry and distance can therefore affect whether inhibition primarily controls somatic firing or selectively gates inputs on individual branches.

=== Coincidence detection and temporal dynamics ===
Timing is critical: the impact of shunting depends on when inhibitory conductance rises relative to excitation. If inhibition occurs before or during an EPSP, it can shrink and shorten the EPSP and prevent spiking. If it arrives after an EPSP, it can limit subsequent summation by narrowing the integration window. Experimental work in visual and auditory cortex has related inhibitory timing to suppression of unwanted excitation and improved temporal precision.

=== Arithmetic of synaptic integration ===
==== Divisive vs subtractive effects on firing rate ====
Shunting was historically assumed to be purely divisive (i.e., scaling firing rates by a factor less than one), but theory and experiments suggest outcomes can be divisive, subtractive, or mixed depending on cellular properties, spike threshold dynamics, and input fluctuations.

==== Gain control under synaptic background activity ====
Under ongoing synaptic background activity, the apparent effect of inhibitory conductance can be state-dependent, with divisive and subtractive-like behaviors depending on background “noise” level and dendritic saturation. Spatial and temporal pairing of excitation and inhibition can impose rules on the effective arithmetic implemented by a neuron.

=== Estimating synaptic conductance in vivo and in vitro ===
Because shunting is fundamentally a change in conductance, approaches often aim to estimate synaptic conductances rather than relying on voltage changes alone.

Fluctuation analysis in current clamp estimates synaptic conductances from membrane potential mean and variance, fitting stochastic membrane models to reconstruct time-varying excitatory and inhibitory conductances.

Dynamic clamp tests how specified inhibitory conductance waveforms affect spiking and integration by injecting artificial conductances. In combination with conductance clamp and voltage clamp approaches, this can be used to evaluate how inhibition kinetics, amplitude, and timing shape shunting efficacy.

== Systems and circuits ==
=== Neocortex ===
Visual cortex (V1)

Shunting inhibition during natural processing has been demonstrated in cat visual cortex using intracellular recordings.

Auditory cortex (A1)

In auditory cortex, excitation and inhibition can be closely matched in time, helping sharpen selectivity and tighten spike timing.

Common themes across cortices

Shunting is often discussed as a rapid operation that depends on stimulus timing and contributes to stability and precision in regimes where excitation and inhibition co-vary.

=== Hippocampus ===
In dentate granule cells, GABA_{A} conductances can depolarize the membrane while still reducing spiking probability via shunting of coincident excitation. In hippocampus, shunting inhibition has been used in interneuron network models/analyses to homogenize firing and support gamma-band rhythms. Coexisting hyperpolarizing and depolarizing GABAergic actions have also been described in cerebellar interneuron networks.

== Network ==
=== Activity stabilization ===
Shunting can help prevent runaway activity in recurrent networks by reducing gain as excitation increases. In sensory cortex, inhibitory conductance can rise alongside excitation, contributing to “balanced” regimes where responses are stabilized and reliable. Surround suppression and normalization phenomena have been linked to inhibitory stabilization mechanisms, including shunting-like conductance increases.

Shunting can also shift a neuron’s operating point by reducing input resistance and the membrane time constant, affecting mean firing rate and the likelihood that background fluctuations trigger spikes.

=== Timing precision and gamma-band oscillations ===
Brief shunting can narrow integration windows and support more precise spike timing in sensory circuits. In interneuron networks, shunting has been discussed as a mechanism to homogenize firing and strengthen gamma-band coherence.

=== State dependence and neuromodulation ===
Whether shunting appears divisive or subtractive can depend on synaptic background noise, membrane potential, dendritic saturation, and nonlinearities (i.e., network state). Because neuromodulators shift operating points, effects on gain and timing can be context-dependent.

== Currently open questions and controversies ==
It has been shown theoretically and experimentally that shunting is not always divisive; simple divisive scaling can fail when spike-threshold dynamics, dendritic nonlinearities, or input fluctuations dominate. Determining boundaries between divisive and subtractive-like effects across cell types and states remains an active topic.

Depolarizing GABA in adult circuits: The prevalence and behavioral role of depolarizing yet inhibitory GABA_{A} currents in adult circuits remains unclear and likely varies with recent activity and cell type.

Quantification in intact brains: Estimating shunting during natural behavior is challenging. Conductance estimation from voltage fluctuations can be informative but is model-dependent, and extending methods to handle active dendritic conductances and rapidly changing states remains an area of development.
