= Synapto-pHluorin =

Synapto-pHluorin is a genetically encoded optical indicator of vesicle release and recycling. It is used in neuroscience to study transmitter release. It consists of a pH-sensitive form of green fluorescent protein (GFP) fused to the luminal side of a vesicle-associated membrane protein (VAMP). At the acidic pH inside transmitter vesicles, synapto-pHluorin is non-fluorescent (quenched). When vesicles get released, synapto-pHluorin is exposed to the neutral extracellular space and the presynaptic terminal becomes brightly fluorescent. Following endocytosis, vesicles become re-acidified and the cycle can start again. Chemical alkalinization of all vesicles is often used for normalization of the synapto-pHluorin signals. Synapto-pHluorin sometimes consists of yellow fluorescent protein (YFP) to monitor the cytoplasm because its pK_{a} is higher than GFP (7.1 versus 6.0).

== History ==
Synapto-pHluorin was invented by Gero Miesenböck in 1998. In 2006, an improved version was published, using synaptophysin to target the GFP to vesicles. In 2013, a two-color release sensor (ratio-sypHy) was introduced to determine the size of the recycling pool at individual synapses.

== Applications ==
Synapto-pHluorin is mainly used by neurobiologists to study transmitter release and recycling at presynaptic terminals. It has also been applied to the study of insulin secretion in beta cells of the pancreas.
