= Cluster of Excellence Frankfurt Macromolecular Complexes =

German research institute

The Cluster of Excellence Frankfurt "Macromolecular Complexes" (CEF) was established in 2006 by Goethe University Frankfurt together with the Max Planck Institute of Biophysics and the Max Planck Institute for Brain Research in the context of the German Universities Excellence Initiative. Funding by the Deutsche Forschungsgemeinschaft (DFG) ended in October 2019. CEF grew out of the long-standing collaborative research on membrane proteins and RNA molecules and strengthened research efforts in these fields by recruiting further scientists to Frankfurt/Main. CEF brought together the research activities of up to 45 research groups, the majority of which were based on Riedberg Campus in Frankfurt/Main. CEF founded the Buchmann Institute for Molecular Life Sciences (BMLS).

== Aims ==
CEF scientists set out to investigate the structure and function of large macromolecular complexes, in particular membrane proteins and their assemblies, complexes involved in signal transduction and quality control, and RNA-protein complexes.

== Research ==
Important structures of macromolecular complexes were determined in CEF. Examples for important membrane complexes include the atomic structures of complex I and the ATP synthase of the mitochondrial respiratory chain and of the transporter associated with antigen processing (TAP). Research on RNA structure and function led to the definition of regulatory principles of temperature sensing riboswitches, the structure-function relationship of RNA polymerase I, the functions of microRNAs and the mechanisms of rRNA maturation and downstream processes during ribosome biogenesis and recycling. For instance, CEF scientists identified the receptors of ubiquitin chains on the proteasome, deciphered the role of linear ubiquitin chains and described macromolecules regulating mitophagy, xenophagy and ER-phagy. They delineated the role of sumoylation in ribosome quality control and characterized the process of genetic quality control in oocytes. The efforts in these three research areas were accompanied by approaches to design or reprogram macromolecular complexes and new methods developed to expand the already strong expertise. CEF scientists established and advanced the principles of optogenetics as well as biochemical methods for light regulation. They also developed biophysical techniques for the structural and functional characterization of macromolecules. Example include light-switchable molecules designed for in-cell applications and time-resolved techniques to study RNA folding. Light sheet fluorescence microscopy for the observation of development and LILBID mass spectrometry for the analysis of membrane complexes was improved. PELDOR-EPR was developed to a resolution that allows in-cell measurements. The Cluster promoted scientific exchange through a range of programmes as well as through workshops, international conferences and lecture series. Optogenetics and light sheet fluorescence microscopy were selected as the "Method of the Year" across all fields of science and engineering by the interdisciplinary research journal Nature Methods in 2010 and 2014, respectively.

The five research areas of CEF included: (A) Structure, mechanisms and dynamics of complexes in the membrane, (B) Composition and dynamics of macromolecular complexes in quality control and signalling, (C) Dynamics of ribonucleic acid-protein-complexes, (D) Design of macromolecular complexes, and (E) Methods for studying macromolecular complexes.

=== CEF Research Area A - Structure, mechanisms and dynamics of complexes in the membrane ===
Biological membranes have a very important role in life processes as everything a cell needs to live, grow and respond has to either pass through or act on them. The energy conversion processes of cellular respiration and photosynthesis happen in membranes, every sensory stimulus and the information processing in the brain is mediated by them. This array of diverse actions is performed by a large number of different membrane proteins. In the crowded conditions of the cell membrane, most membrane proteins associate into complex dynamic assemblies to carry out their various tasks. For this reason, and because they are embedded in the lipid bilayer of the membrane, most membrane proteins are difficult to study and their functions have often been intractable. CEF scientists have done groundbreaking work to overcome some of these challenges and made major contributions to elucidating the structure, mechanisms and regulation of a number of important large complexes, including respiratory complex I, rotary ATPases, supercomplex I_{1}III_{2}IV_{1}, cytochrome cbb3 oxidase, cytochrome bd oxidase, a sulfide:quinone oxidoreductase, a fungal TOM core complex, a bacterial double-pore K+ uptake system KtrAB, the Na+-independent carnitine/butyrobetaine antiporter CaiT, the betaine/Na+ symporter BetP, the multidrug efflux transporter AcrB and the chaperone and editing TAPBPR–MHC I complex and the human MHC-I peptide-loading complex. Antigenic peptide recognition on TAP was resolved by DNP-enhanced solid-state NMR spectroscopy. The conformational coupling and trans-inhibition in the human antigen transporter ortholog TmrAB was resolved with the aid of dipolar EPR spectroscopy. The progress in 3D structure determination of membrane proteins by X-ray crystallography and cryo electron microscopy has created an increasing demand and opportunity for in-depth mechanistic studies by magnetic resonance methods. Due to the challenges intrinsic to membrane proteins, progress relies on the availability of techniques at the forefront of method development. Especially solid-state (MAS) NMR enables bridging the gap between 'static' structures and biochemical data by probing membrane proteins directly within the bilayer environment. Such experiments are challenging and breakthroughs could only be achieved thanks to the availability of dynamic nuclear polarization for sensitivity enhancement and very high magnetic fields for spectral resolution. CEF scientists were able to provide new insights into the catalytic mechanism of ABC transporters. Based on real-time 31P-MAS-NMR they found that the homodimeric lipid A flippase MsbA is able to catalyze a reverse adenylate kinase-like reaction in addition to ATP hydrolysis. In addition, the ATP hydrolysis cycle of the ABC transporter LmrA was probed by site-directed spin labeling and pulsed electron–electron double resonance (PELDOR/DEER) spectroscopy. The secondary multidrug efflux pump EmrE from E. coli was extensively studied with 31P- and DNP-enhanced solid-state NMR. Also, a number of photoreceptors such as microbial rhodopsins are involved in trans-membrane transport processes. For example, fundamental contributions were made towards the structural and functional description of proteorhodopsin, a pentameric light-driven proton pump by groups within CEF. CEF researchers have developed mass spectrometry approaches specifically suitable for large membrane protein complexes. Laser induced liquid beam/bead ion desorption mass spectrometry (LILBID) enables mass analysis of whole membrane protein complexes of 1 MDa or more. A team of CEF scientists resolved the mechanism of the subtype selectivity of human bradykinin receptors for their peptide agonists by integrating DNP-enhanced solid-state nuclear magnetic resonance with advanced molecular modeling and docking

=== CEF Research Area B - Composition and dynamics of macromolecular complexes in quality control and signalling ===
The characterization of function and structural composition of signalling complexes controlling cellular quality control programs was one of the major topics of CEF research. The view that proteins act as single entities has been replaced with the concept suggesting that dynamic reorganization of multimeric soluble complexes annotated as signalosomes is essential for signal transmission in the cell. Regulation of the activity of these complexes is achieved by their dynamic composition as well as by post-translational modifications (PTMs) of proteins. Domains that recognize these modifications play decisive roles in a cell's ability to respond to alterations in their microenvironment. Significant progress has been accomplished by CEF in characterizing several signalling pathways and their regulation by PTMs including ubiquitylation, phosphorylation and acetylation. A particular focus of research in CEF has been on protein quality control mechanisms that are the basis for the autophagic and the ubiquitin/proteasomal pathways, the two cellular systems used to degrade faulty or superfluous proteins, complexes and organelles. Additional foci of CEF research were genetic quality control in oocytes and epithelial stem cells by the p53 protein and the regulation of and by kinases.

==== Research into autophagy ====
During selective autophagy, cargo is specifically targeted for degradation, and distinct cargo receptors have been described that regulate selectivity. This process is facilitated by autophagy receptors specifically recognizing and binding their cargo, and delivering it to the phagophore. In humans, there are six different LC3/GABARAP proteins, which play a central role by connecting nascent autophagosome membranes and cargo-loaded autophagy receptors to facilitate engulfment, sometimes mediated or supported by additional adaptor proteins. CEF scientists showed that GABARAP proteins are not only involved in autophagy but also in the ubiquitin-dependent degradation of TIAM1. Breakthroughs were achieved in how cells fight intracellular pathogens and how intracellular bacteria try to evade these counter measures. The kinase Tbk1 was identified as important for mediating optineurin based xenophagy to remove the bacteria from the infected cells. Using mass spectrometry, a global analysis of the ubiquitinome of Salmonella-infected cells was carried out, that enabled CEF scientists to identify specific targets of bacterial ligases that are secreted into the cellular cytoplasm by the pathogens. CEF scientists also revealed the molecular mechanism of a novel type of phosphoribosyl-linked serine ubiquitination by the effector SdeA of the pathogen Legionella, which is very different from the canonical lysine-based ubiquitination mechanism. They further showed that another effector of Legionella bacteria, SidJ, opposes the toxicity of SidE in yeast and mammalian cells. Mass spectrometry analysis revealed that SidJ is a glutamylase that modifies the catalytic glutamate in the mono-ADP ribosyl transferase domain of the SdeA, thus blocking the ubiquitin ligase activity of SdeA. They further discovered that reticulon-type proteins act as ER-specific autophagy receptors and simulated their effect on the membrane curvature.

==== Ubiquitination ====
Ubiquitination plays a central role for marking proteins to be degraded either via the autophagy pathway or via the proteasome. Several groups of CEF have contributed to advances in understanding how ubiquitin signalling is not only used as a degradation signal but also involved in several other cellular processes

==== p63 ====
Research on TP63, also known as p63, has shown that this protein plays essential roles both for the proliferation and differentiation of stratified epithelial tissues as well as for the surveillance of the genetic quality in female germ cells. Investigations by CEF scientists showed that a specific isoform of p63 is highly expressed in primordial oocytes which are arrested in prophase of meiosis I. This isoform adopts a closed, inactive and only dimeric conformation in which both, the interaction with the DNA as well as with the transcriptional machinery is significantly reduced The inhibition is achieved by blocking the tetramerization interface of the oligomerization domain with a six-stranded anti-parallel beta-sheet. Activation requires phosphorylation and follows a spring-loaded, irreversible activation mechanism. These discoveries open the possibility to develop a therapy for preserving oocytes during chemotherapy which in female cancer patients usually results in infertility and the premature onset of menopause. CEF scientists also helped to identify the molecular mechanism causing ankyloblepharon-ectodermal dysplasia-cleft lip/palate syndrome, a disease characterized by skin erosions, oral clefting abnormalities and fused eyelids, which is based on mutations in the SAM domain or in the C-terminus of p63. Complexes involved in tumorigenesis were studied by several CEF groups, including the leukemogenic AF4-MLL fusion protein and RIP1-containing cytosolic complexes that are critical for the initiation and fine-tuning of different forms of cell death, i.e. apoptosis and necroptosis

==== SGC Frankfurt ====
Goethe University became a member of the Structural Genomics Consortium (SGC) in 2017, an international consortium and public-private partnership dedicated to the determination of structures of important proteins and the development of inhibitors and probes for biological macromolecules to be used in functional investigations. Goethe University has also become the home and reference center for the SGC's donated probes programme, that makes small molecules no longer being further pursued by industry as drug targets freely available to researchers worldwide). CEF scientists have developed bromodomain inhibitors that can be used to study the function of these acetyl-lysine modification binding domains. A set of probes has been characterized and validated as tools for specific bromodomains

==== Interactions with soluble domains at the membrane ====
CEF showed that vascular endothelial growth factor receptor-2 needs to be internalized and is regulated by its association to ephrin B2 in endothelial cells. Ephrin B2 was also found to be essential to control levels of AMPA receptors at the synaptic membrane. The mechanism of membrane insertion of tail-anchored proteins was studied by structural and biochemical characterization of the interaction of the soluble Get3 protein with the cytoplasmatic domains of the membrane-bound receptors Get1 and Get2.

=== CEF Research Area C - Dynamics of ribonucleic acid-protein-complexes ===
Many discoveries including the identification of multiple classes of noncoding RNAs and regulatory RNA elements has broadened the perspective on RNA function from a passive carrier of information to an active cellular component. Its structural and functional description is required to understand the molecular interactions and the dynamics involved.

==== Structural description of RNA elements and their dynamics ====
The combination of high-resolution NMR-based analysis of RNA structures and time-resolved ligand-induced refolding of RNAs by caging distinct conformations together with pulsed electron paramagnetic resonance methods (PELDOR) after base-specific spin-labeling and ultrafast laser spectroscopy of RNA dynamics has led to the description of the structural dynamics of several RNAs. CEF scientists showed that the regulation mechanism of the adenine-sensing riboswitch of the human pathogenic bacterium Vibrio vulnificus is notably different from a two-state switch mechanism in that it involves three distinct stable conformations. This translational adenine-sensing riboswitch represented the first example of a temperature-compensated regulatory RNA element . The composition and structure of the HIV TAR RNA-Ligand complex was analyzed by LILBID and NMR, leading to a description of the complexity of peptide binding sites in RNAs. Furthermore, the guanine-sensing riboswitch-aptamer domain of the Bacillus subtilis xpt-pbuX operon, the Diels-Alderase ribozymes an RNA-based thermometer, and the N1–ribostamycin complex were structurally and functionally analyzed. CEF scientists also showed that for the guanine-sensing xpt-pbuX riboswitch of B. subtilis, the conformation of the full-length transcripts is static: it exclusively populates the functional off-state but cannot switch to the on-state, regardless of the presence or absence of ligand. Only the combined matching of transcription rates and ligand binding enables transcription intermediates to undergo ligand-dependent conformational refolding(Steinert et al., 2017).

==== Components involved in ribosome biogenesis in eukaryotes ====
CEF scientists in collaboration with the Max Planck Institute for Biophysical Chemistry visualized the RNA Polymerase I (Pol I) in the process of actively transcribing ribosome genes in a cellular environment and solved its structure with and without nucleic acids at 3.8 Å resolution by cryo-EM. Their structures explained the regulation of transcription elongation in which contracted and expanded polymerase conformations are associated with active and inactive states, respectively.

Work by a collaboration between several CEF groups unravelled the molecular nature of Bowen-Conradi syndrome by demonstrating that the disease-causing point mutation of the ribosome biogenesis factor Nep1 impairs its nucleolar localisation and RNA binding. Another study, in collaboration with Edinburg University, analysed the RNA helicase Prp43 by crosslinking of RNA and analysis of cDNA (CRAC) and provided first insights into the functional roles of this enzyme in ribosome biogenesis CEF scientists also identified plant-specific ribosome biogenesis factors in A. thaliana with essential function in rRNA processing and showed that the 60S-associated ribosome biogenesis factor LSG1-2 is required for 40S maturation in A. thaliana.

==== Distribution of RNA-modifying enzymes and RNA molecules ====
The dynamics of RNPs in native environments in eukaryotic cells were visualized and quantified using high-resolution microscopy. Adenosine-to-inosine (A-to-I) RNA editing, which is catalyzed by adenosine deaminase acting on RNA (ADAR) enzymes, is important in the epitranscriptomic regulation of RNA metabolism. Cathepsin S (CTSS) mRNA, which encodes a cysteine protease associated with angiogenesis and atherosclerosis, was shown to be highly edited in human endothelial cells . A-to-I RNA editing controls cathepsin S expression in atherosclerosis by enabling HuR-mediated post-transcriptional regulation.

mRNA export from the nucleus to the cytoplasm is a highly regulated step in gene expression. CEF scientists evaluated members of the SR protein family (SRSF1–7) for their potential to act as adaptors for nuclear export factor 1 (NXF1) and thereby couple pre-mRNA processing to mRNA export. They found that >1000 endogenous mRNAs required individual SR proteins for nuclear export in vivo. To address the mechanism, transcriptome-wide RNA-binding profiles of NXF1 and SRSF1–7 were determined in parallel by individual-nucleotide-resolution UV crosslinking and immunoprecipitation (iCLIP). SRSF3 emerged as the most potent NXF1 adaptor, conferring sequence specificity to RNA binding by NXF1 in last exons. Numerous human diseases are characterised by a widespread dysregulation of RNA-binding proteins (RBPs) and massively altered transcriptome patterns. CEF scientists used computational methods to study the mechanisms of posttranscriptional regulation on a transcriptomic scale, in collaboration with researchers at IMB Mainz.

==== Noncoding RNAs ====
CEF scientists also investigated the influence of novel, noncoding RNAs, such as long noncoding RNAs (lncRNAs) and microRNAs (miRNAs), on cellular function. miRNAs regulate gene expression by binding to target mRNAs and preventing their translation. One of the CEF Focus Projects succeeded in observing the activity-dependent spatially-localized miRNA maturation in neuronal dendrites. Local maturation of the miRNA was found to be associated with a local reduction in protein synthesis, showing that localized miRNA maturation can modulate target gene expression with local and temporal precision. LncRNA Meg3 was found to control endothelial cell aging and its inhibition may serve as a potential therapeutic strategy to rescue aging-mediated impairment of endothelial cell function. LncRNA MALAT1 was found to regulate endothelial cell function and vessel growth. and protects against atherosclerosis by regulating inflammation.

=== CEF Research Area D - Design of macromolecular complexes ===
A major focus of work in CEF was to develop and use methods and to explore proteins that enable modulating cellular and molecular function with light. In the field of optogenetics, control of membrane potential and intracellular signalling in neurons and other cells is achieved by expression of photosensor proteins, in most cases of microbial origin, e.g. ion channels or pumps, as well as light-activated enzymes. Optochemical approaches, in contrast, use chemically engineered molecules to achieve light-effects in biological tissue.

==== Optogenetics ====
The origin of optogenetics lies in the work of the Bamberg group at the MPI of Biophysics in Frankfurt, who showed that channelrhodopsin-2 (ChR2) is a light-gated cation channel that can depolarize the cells in which it is expressed. During CEF, the Bamberg lab continued to work in this field and contributed several seminal papers, e.g. on the characterization but also on the engineering of ChR2 to optogenetic tools with different properties. The first utilization of ChR2 for depolarization of mammalian cells and generation of the first ChR2-transgenic animal took place in Frankfurt. The Gottschalk lab introduced ChR2, the light-driven Cl—pump halorhodopsin and other rhodopsins into the nervous system of the nematode C. elegans, to stimulate single neurons and correlate their function with a behavioural output. In addition, they studied synaptic transmission after photostimulation, using ChR2 and a photoactivated adenylyl cyclase (PAC), in combination with electrophysiology and electron microscopy, and introduced modified or novel optogenetic tools with altered properties, for blocking synaptic transmission, or for the manipulation of cyclic GMP. Several CEF groups joined forces not only to unravel the photocycle of ChR2 at different time scales but also provided, in collaboration with the Research Centre Juelich, structural insights into ion conduction by ChR2. They also generated several mutant ChR2 versions with altered ion conductance (for example increased Ca^{2+}-permeability in "CatCh", a Ca^{2+} transporting channelrhodopsin) or kinetics, representing highly useful additions to the optogenetic toolbox . In 2015, CEF scientists presented the first NMR study which resolved structural details of the retinal cofactor of ChR2. This study was only possible because DNP (a hybrid method linking EPR with solid-state NMR spectroscopy) enhanced the detection sensitivity 60-fold so that metastable intermediates could be detected. In this way, first unambiguous evidence was provided for an exclusive all-trans retinal conformation in the dark state and a new photointermediate could be identified. The study showed that DNP-enhanced solid-state NMR is a key method for bridging the gap between X-ray–based structure analysis and functional studies towards a highly resolved molecular picture .

It gradually emerged that rhodopsins have a wide spectrum of functions and distribution and are found in all phyla of life. With the new rhodopsins came the observation that they represent a rather versatile family of proteins while retaining the structural scaffold of seven transmembrane helices with a retinal chromophore bound to a conserved lysine. CEF scientists have studied the structure as well as the function of microbial rhodopsins. One of these is proteorhodopsin, found in marine microbes, which is the most abundant retinal-based photoreceptor on our planet. Variants of proteorhodopsins show high levels of environmental adaptation, as their colours are tuned to the optimal wavelength of available light.

CEF scientists together with colleagues from other German universities developed a novel approach to alter the functional properties of rhodopsin optogenetic tools, namely by modifications of the retinal chromophore. Synthetic retinal analogs were introduced into ChR2 or other rhodopsin tools in C. elegans, Drosophila and human cells, to change the light sensitivity, photo cycle kinetics and colour spectrum of the optogenetic actuators. They also established the tightly light-regulated guanylyl-cyclase opsin CyclOp that enabled rapid light-triggered cGMP increase. CEF scientists have also used optogenetic tools for the analysis of neural circuits and how they drive behaviour.

==== Optochemical approaches ====
To control proteins and nucleic acids by light CEF scientists have designed and applied a range of photoswitchable tethers, ribonucleosides and nucleic acids, RNA aptamers and "beacons". They also developed an approach for the chemoenzymatic synthesis of position-specifically modified RNA for biophysical studies including light control. Furthermore, light-activatable interaction of DNA nanoarchitectures, light-dependent conformational changes in nucleic acids, light-dependent RNA interference and light-dependent transcription were realized. Wavelength-selective light-triggering was established for nucleic acids as well as three-dimensional control of DNA hybridization by orthogonal two-colour two-photon uncaging. CEF scientists developed a red-shifted two-photon-only caging group for three-dimensional photorelease. They also developed a minimal light-switchable module enabling the formation of an intermolecular and conformationally well-defined DNA G-quadruplex structure with a photoswitchable azobenzene residue as part of the backbone structure. Important was also the development of an inducible fluorescent probe which enabled the detection of activity-dependent spatially localized miRNA maturation in neuronal dendrites. Using light-inducible antimiRs, CEF scientists also investigated if locally restricted target miRNA activity has a therapeutic benefit in diabetic wound healing and found that light can be used to locally activate therapeutically active antimiRs in vivo.

New building principles for DNA-nanoarchitectures have been established in CEF Also, new RNA riboswitches have been designed that can be triggered with small metabolites, exogenous molecules, or by temperature changes, as well as aptamers or self-cleaving ribozymes, which can be used to control gene expression in vivo. Making macromolecules further accessible on the nano-scale for manipulation, CEF developed generally applicable methods to organize macromolecular complexes in two dimensions with very high precision, as well as small synthetic gatekeepers and novel "light switches" to control biomolecular interactions and assembly of macromolecular complexes An approach to assemble three-dimensional protein networks by two-photon activation was developed. CEF scientists also achieved optical control of antigen translocation using synthetic photo-conditional viral inhibitors.

==== Protein engineering ====
CEF scientists used detailed structural knowledge of the fatty acid synthase (FAS) megacomplex to engineer FAS for the biosynthesis of short-chain fatty acids and polyketides, guided by a combined in vitro and in silico approach . They reprogrammed chain-length control of the FAS of Saccharomyces cerevisiae to create a baker's yeast able to produce short-chain fatty acids. A rational and minimally invasive protein engineering approach was used that left the molecular mechanisms of FASs unchanged and identified five mutations that can make baker's yeast produce short-chain fatty acids. To manipulate a protein photocycle in a directed manner, CEF groups collaborated to modify the flavoprotein dodecin at its key amino acid tryptophan with substituents carefully selected for their structural and electronic influence.

=== CEF Research Area E - Methods for studying macromolecular complexes ===
The development of cutting-edge methodologies, including electron paramagnetic resonance (EPR), time-resolved nuclear magnetic resonance spectroscopy (NMR), advanced fluorescence microscopy, as well as optogenetics and optochemical biology has been instrumental in the research efforts of CEF. The Cluster also integrated new developments in electron microscopy and tomography as well as in super-resolution microscopy into the methods portfolio of Riedberg Campus.

==== Cryo-electron microscopy ====
Cryo-electron microscopy, Nature Method of the Year 2015 and the method for which a Nobel prize was awarded in 2017, was extensively employed by several CEF groups, at the MPI of Biophysics as well as at Goethe University's Buchmann Institute for Molecular Biology. Direct electron detectors, in the development of which the MPI of Biophysics was involved, have exceeded all expectations With these detectors, images can be captured with much higher contrast than with the CCD cameras previously used and have led to amazing progress in structural biology. By investing in this new technology, CEF members have been able to speed up structure determination and also solve the structures of macromolecular complexes that were not amenable to x-ray crystallography studies. Another focus of CEFs electron microscopists was to reveal the macromolecular organisation of living cells by means of cryo-electron tomography. Cryo-ET is the only technique that can obtain molecular resolution images of intact cells in a quasi-native environment. Such tomograms contain a large amount of information as they are essentially a three-dimensional map of the cellular proteome and depict the whole network of macromolecular interactions. Information-mining algorithms exploit structural data from various techniques, identify distinct macromolecules and computationally fit atomic resolution structures in the cellular tomograms, thereby bridging the resolution gap.

==== Light microscopy ====
The Cluster also strongly support new developments in advanced light microscopy. A particularly important technique CEF added to the research technique portfolio in Frankfurt is light sheet fluorescence microscopy (LSFM)). In LSFM, optical sectioning in the excitation process minimizes fluorophore bleaching and phototoxic effects. Because with LSFM biological specimens survive long-term three-dimensional imaging at high spatiotemporal resolution, such microscopes have become the tool of choice in developmental biology. The impact of LSFM was recognized in 2015, when the journal Nature Methods elected it as the "Method of the Year 2014". CEF scientists used LSFM, for example, to image in detail the complete embryonic development of different evolutionary unrelated insects and to establish the rules and self-organizing properties of post-embryonic plant organ cell division patterns. The large amount of data produced by advanced light microscopy has made automated image analysis a necessity and CEF has contributed to improved data processing and modelling of advanced light microscopy data. Other novel light microscopy techniques used by CEF scientists include techniques that provide single-molecule sensitivity and a spatial resolution below the diffraction limit to study the structural organization of biomolecules in cells. Software tools developed by CEF scientists include for example SuReSim, a software developed in collaboration with Heidelberg University, that simulates localization data of arbitrary three-dimensional structures represented by ground truth models, allowing users to systematically explore how changing experimental parameters can affect potential imaging outcomes. Using the newly developed techniques, CEF scientists were able to establish the role of the linear ubiquitin coat around the cytosolic pathogen Salmonella Typhimurium as the local NF-κB signalling platform and provided insights into the function of OTULIN in NF-κB activation during bacterial pathogenesis. Another example is the identification of reticulon 3 (RTN3) as a specific receptor for the degradation of ER tubules. The close collaborative teamwork of the consortium allowed tackling two major challenges in live-cell as well as single-molecule localization microscopy: efficient delivery of fluorophores across cell membranes and high-density protein tracing by ultra small labels. Collectively, the new tools provide additional avenues to specifically manipulate and trap cellular proteins, and, at the same time, for high-resolution read-out by single-molecule based microscopy.

==== Spectroscopy methods ====
A wide range of spectroscopy methods for biological applications were available within CEF and CEF scientists have made significant progress in further developing biomolecular NMR and EPR. The members of the Center for Biomolecular Magnetic Resonance (BMRZ) improved the sensitivity of liquid- and solid-state NMR by a spectrometer featuring dynamic nuclear polarization (DNP). Together with researchers from the Russian Academy of Sciences, CEF scientists developed a high-power gyrotron source for DNP. The source operates at 260 GHz with an output power of 20 W, and is connected by a quasi-optical corrugated waveguide to one liquid- and one solid-state 400 MHz NMR spectrometer. The microwave board, which detects the EPR signal and connects the high-power microwave source to the NMR probe, was constructed in collaboration with scientists from the Ukrainian Academy of Sciences. This unique device is based on a metallo-dielectric waveguide system, which guarantees ultra-low losses combined with a high degree of flexibility in terms of instrument design. CEF's scientists demonstrated a proton NMR signal enhancement in aqueous liquids by up to 80-fold at magnetic fields of 9. T, thus exceeding theoretical predictions by more than a factor of 20. First applications to macromolecular complexes have been equally successful. They also recorded signal enhancements by a factor up to 40 under magic angle sample spinning (MAS) conditions at 100 K with proteorhodopsin re-constituted into lipid bilayers. By integrating DNP-enhanced solid-state NMR spectroscopy with advanced molecular modeling and docking, the mechanism of the subtype selectivity of human kinin G-protein-coupled receptors for their peptide agonists was resolved. DNP-enhanced solid-state NMR spectroscopy enabled CEF scientists to determine the atomic-resolution backbone conformation of an antigenic peptide bound to the human ABC transporter TAP. Their NMR data also provided unparalleled insights into the nature of the interactions between the side chains of the antigen peptide and TAP. Their findings revealed a structural and chemical basis of substrate selection rules, which define the crucial function of this ABC transporter in human immunity and health. This work was the first NMR study of a eukaryotic transporter protein complex and demonstrated the power of solid-state NMR in this field They also demonstrated the power of DNP-enhanced solid-state NMR to bridge the gap between functional and structural data and models. In parallel to the DNP developments, a pulsed electron–electron double resonance (PELDOR) spectrometer with a magnetic field of 6.4 T was constructed. A protein concentration of only 10 pMol is sufficient for a measurement at 40 K. With this instrument, CEF scientists were able to determine the dimeric structure of non-covalent protein complexes. This method is also applicable to membrane proteins and spin-labelled RNA and DNA molecules in vivo. PELDOR spectroscopy proved to be a versatile tool for structural investigations of proteins, even in the cellular environment. In order to investigate for example the structural implications of the asymmetric nucleotide-binding domains and the trans-inhibition mechanism in TAP orthologs, spin-label pairs were introduced via double cysteine mutants at the nucleotide-binding domains and transmembrane domains in TmrAB (a functional homologue of the human antigen translocation complex TAP) and the conformational changes and the equilibrium populations followed using PELDOR spectroscopy. This study defined the mechanistic basis for trans-inhibition, which operates by a reverse transition from the outward-facing state through an occluded conformation. The results uncovered the central role of reversible conformational equilibrium in the function and regulation of an ABC exporter and established a mechanistic framework for future investigations on other medically important transporters with imprinted asymmetry. The study also demonstrated for the first-time the feasibility to resolve equilibrium populations at multiple domains and their interdependence for global conformational changes in a large membrane protein complex.

==== Mass spectrometry ====
Native mass spectrometry has emerged as an important tool in structural biology. Advantages of mass spectrometry compared to other methods like X-ray crystallography or nuclear magnetic resonance are for instance its lower limits of detection, its speed and its capability to deal with heterogeneous samples. CEF contributed to the development of laser-induced liquid bead ion desorption mass spectrometry (LILBID), a method developed at Goethe University that is especially suited to the analysis of large membrane protein complexes. A challenge in native mass spectrometry is maintaining the features of the proteins of interest, such as oligomeric state, bound ligands, or the conformation of the protein complex, during the transfer from the solution to the gas phase. This is an essential prerequisite to allow conclusions about the solution state protein complex, based on the gas phase measurements. Therefore, soft ionization techniques are required. While standard methods, such as nESI and matrix-assisted laser desorption/ionization (MALDI) reliably deliver valuable results for soluble proteins, they are not universally applicable to the more challenging matrices which are often required for membrane protein complexes. Generally an artificial membrane mimetic environment is required to maintain a membrane protein complex in its native state outside of the cellular environment. With LILBID the analyte is transferred into the mass spectrometer in small droplets (30 or 50 μm diameter) of the sample solution produced by a piezo-driven droplet generator and is desorbed from the aqueous solution by irradiation with a mid-IR laser. This results in biomolecular ions with lower, more native-like charge states in comparison to nESI. At ultra-soft desorption conditions, even weakly interacting subunits of large protein complexes remain associated, so that the mass of the whole complex can be determined. At higher laser intensities, the complex dissociates by thermolysis and subunit masses are recorded. A broad range of macromolecular complexes from CEF research areas A, C and D, including complex I, ATP synthase, drug transporters with binding proteins, ion channels, proteorhodopsins and DNA/RNA complexes, have been analysed using LILBID.

==== Time-resolved spectroscopy ====
Femtosecond time-resolved spectroscopy was used by CEF scientists to study molecular dynamics and function. This method enables the observation of extremely fast chemical and biological reactions in real time involving a wide variety of molecules from small organic compounds to complex enzymes. Studies included molecular systems like optical switches, natural and non-natural photosynthetic model systems and membrane protein complexes. Fundamental processes in molecular physical chemistry were investigated, such as photoisomerization, energy and electron transfer and reaction dynamics at surfaces. Modern methods in quantum optics for the generation of appropriately shaped and tunable femtosecond pulses in the visible and infrared spectral range were employed and further developed. Examples of these studies include the investigation and deciphering of the dynamics of photoswitchable or photolabile compounds as basis for the design of photoresponsive biomacromolecules, of the primary reaction dynamics of channelrhodopsin-2 (ChR2) and of the conformational dynamics of antibiotic-binding aptamers: Photochromic spiropyrans are organic molecules that can be used for the triggering of biological reactions.

==== Theoretical biophysics and bioinformatics ====
Method development in theoretical biophysics plays an increasingly important role in the study of macromolecular complexes and has made essential contributions to many studies in the other research areas of CEF. Bridging between fundamental physics, chemistry and biology, CEF scientists studied biomolecular processes over a broad resolution range, from quantum mechanics to chemical kinetics, from atomistic descriptions of physical processes and chemical reactions in molecular dynamics (MD) simulations to highly coarse-grained models of the non-equilibrium operation of molecular machines and network descriptions of protein interactions. Their goal is to develop detailed and quantitative descriptions of key biomolecular processes, including energy conversion, molecular transport, signal transduction, and enzymatic catalysis. Within CEF, they worked in close collaboration with experimental scientists who employ a wide variety of methods. Their computational and theoretical studies aided in the interpretation of increasingly complex measurements, and guided the design of future experiments. The interdisciplinary field of bioinformatics opened new perspectives on molecular processes and cellular function. CEF scientists used custom-tailored code and pipelines for fast and efficient analysis of omics data, with a primary focus on protein-RNA interactions and posttranscriptional regulation. They also develops algorithms to solve problems in molecular biology, ranging from atomic protein structure analysis to computational systems biology. Their tools leverage on graph theory, Petri nets and Boolean networks with broad applications within CEF. Their collaborations cover diverse topics from plant metabolomics, to human signal transduction networks and the dissection of the macromolecular complexome.

== Organisation ==
The CEF Assembly coordinated the research and elected the CEF Speaker and the CEF Board of Directors. The CEF Assembly consisted of the Principal Investigators, Adjunct Investigators, Senior Investigators as well as Associated Members. Speakers of CEF included Werner Müller-Esterl (Nov 2006-Jan 2009), Harald Schwalbe (Feb 2009 - Feb 2013) and Volker Dötsch (March 2013 - October 2019).

== Publications ==
CEF scientists published more than 2600 original research publications (incl. 479 research papers in journals with an impact factor of ≥10) during the Cluster's lifetime. A full list can be found here.

== Honours and prizes awarded to CEF scientists ==
A full list can be found here.
