= Linda Columbus =

American chemist and academic

Linda Marie Columbus
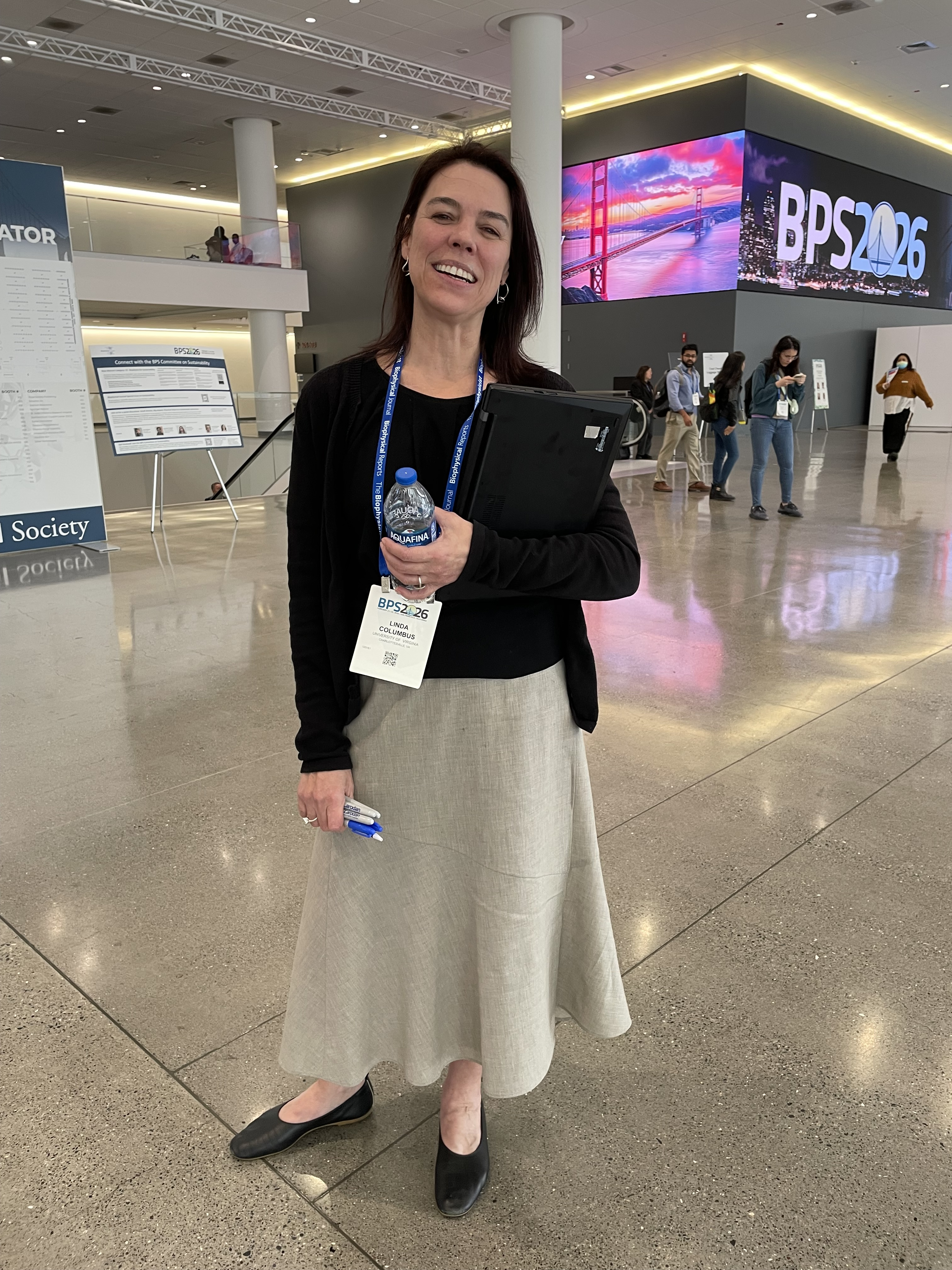
- Linda Columbus at the 2026 Biophysical Society Meeting
- Education: Scripps Research Institute, University of California, Los Angeles; Smith College
- Awards: NSF CAREER Award, Cottrell Scholar Award, Virginia Outstanding Faculty Awarda
- Scientific career
- Workplaces: Scripps Research Institute, University of Virginia
- Thesis: Investigating backbone and side chain dynamics of alpha-helices in the nanosecond regime with site-directed spin labeling (2001)
- Website: Columbus Lab

Linda Columbus is an American chemist who is Professor of Chemistry and Molecular Physiology at the University of Virginia. She investigates the structure-function properties of membrane proteins.

== Early life and education ==
Columbus was born to young parents, neither of whom were educated beyond high school, and she grew up in New Hampshire. Columbus was an undergraduate at Smith College and she earned her Ph.D. at the University of California, Los Angeles. In her doctoral research with Prof. Wayne L. Hubbell, she used spin labelling to understand the backbone and side chain dynamics of α-helices in the nanosecond regime. After earning her doctorate, Columbus joined The Scripps Research Institute as an NIH research fellow.

== Research and career ==
Columbus joined the University of Virginia as a faculty member in 2013, and she is currently chair and professor of the Department of Chemistry and professor of Molecular Physiology and Biological Physics. She studies membrane proteins that comprise around one quarter of a proteome. These membrane proteins are involved with information transfer across lipid bilayers, and are used as drug targets. Columbus investigates the membrane proteins that mediate interactions between hosts and bacterial pathogens. To study the structures of the membrane proteins involved in cellular invasion by bacterial pathogens, Columbus uses site-directed spin labelling and nuclear magnetic resonance.

Columbus has held leadership positions within the Biophysical Society including serving as an elected member of the Biophysical Society Council, co-organizing meetings on the Molecular Biophysics of Membranes in 2022 and 2024, and serving as programming co-chair of the upcoming 2027 Biophysical Society meeting.

== Awards and honors ==
- 2009 NSF CAREER Award
- 2010 Cottrell Scholar Award
- 2014 Virginia Outstanding Faculty Award
- 2018 Biophysical Society Council

== Selected publications ==
- Linda Columbus; Wayne L Hubbell (1 June 2002). "A new spin on protein dynamics". Trends in Biochemical Sciences. 27 (6): 288–295. doi:10.1016/s0968-0004(02)02095-9. ISSN 0968-0004. PMID 12069788. Wikidata Q34691381.
- L Columbus; T Kálai; J Jekö; K Hideg; W L Hubbell (1 April 2001). "Molecular motion of spin labeled side chains in alpha-helices: analysis by variation of side chain structure". Biochemistry. 40 (13): 3828–3846. doi:10.1021/bi002645h. ISSN 0006-2960. PMID 11300763. Wikidata Q43573920.
- Jan Lipfert; Linda Columbus; Vincent B Chu; Scott A Lesley; Sebastian Doniach (9 October 2007). "Size and shape of detergent micelles determined by small-angle X-ray scattering". The Journal of Physical Chemistry B. 111 (43): 12427–12438. doi:10.1021/jp073016l. ISSN 1520-6106. PMID 17924686. Wikidata Q44871938.
