= Robert Tampé =

German biochemist

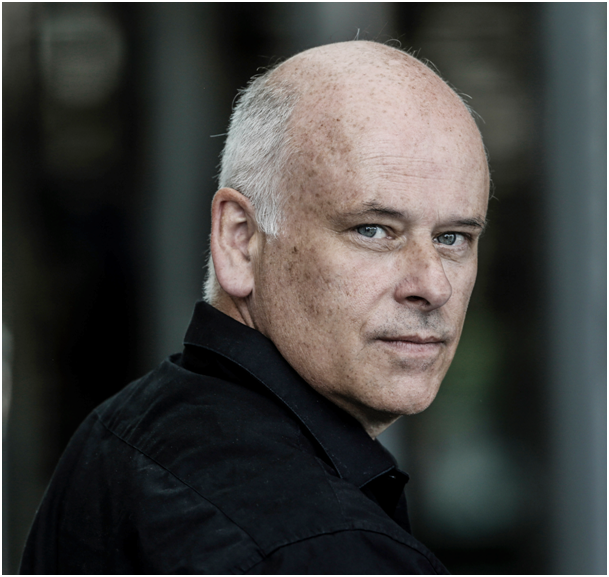
- Robert Tampé (2023)
- Born: 14 August 1961 (age 65); Seligenstadt, Germany
- Education: Technische Universität Darmstadt
- Scientific career
- Fields: Biochemistry
- Workplaces: Goethe University Frankfurt

Robert Tampé (born August 14, 1961) is a German biochemist. Since 2001, he is director of the Institute of Biochemistry at Goethe University Frankfurt. He is known for his work on antigen processing, viral immune evasion and cellular quality control.

== Life and career ==
Tampé studied chemistry at Technische Universität Darmstadt from 1981 to 1987 and received his doctorate in biochemistry in 1989. He wrote his dissertation on the function of membrane proteins and passed with summa cum laude. As a Max Kade fellow, he worked with Harden M. McConnell at Stanford University from 1990 to 1991. Afterwards, he worked at the Max Planck Institute of Biochemistry in Martinsried, Germany until 1998, where he led an independent research group and began his work on antigen processing. At the same time, he established an independent junior research group in the field of membrane biophysics at the Technical University of Munich, where he habilitated in 1996 in the subject of biochemistry.

He was appointed assistant professor in biochemistry and biophysics at the Technical University of Munich in 1996. From 1996 to 1998, he was a Heisenberg Fellow at the German Research Foundation (DFG). From 1998 to 2001, Tampé took on his first full professorship and headed the Institute of Physiological Chemistry at the University Hospital of Marburg. In 2001, Tampé took on a professorship at the Goethe University Frankfurt, where he has also been director of the Institute for Biochemistry since then.

From 2005 to 2019 he was curator and chair of the selection committee for the Einhard-Preis (European Literary Prize for Biography). In 2009, he received a visiting professorship at the University of California, San Francisco and in 2010 an honorary guest professorship at Kyoto University in Japan. Since 2017, Tampé holds visiting professorships at the University of Oxford (Department of Biochemistry) and at Merton College in Oxford. In 2019, he declined an offer as director of the Institute of Structural and Molecular Biology and Head of Joint Research Departments at University College London and at Birkbeck, University of London.

Tampé is co-initiator and member of several Graduate Schools funded by the DFG, EU or MPG. He is a member of several research advisory boards, international committees and research associations as well as the European Molecular Biology Organization (EMBO) and acts as curator of the Paul Ehrlich and Ludwig Darmstaedter Early Career Award.

== Research focus and grants ==
Tampé's research focuses on the structure and mechanism of membrane proteins, macromolecular complexes in antigen processing and presentation, cellular quality control and mRNA translation, viral immune evasion, chemical and synthetic biology, as well as nanobiotechnology. His laboratory works in the field of cellular biochemistry and investigates intracellular transport systems that are fundamental to the structure and function of the immune system.

He has received grants from the German Research Foundation (DFG) multiple times. In 2017, he was awarded a 2.5 million EUR advanced grant from the European Research Council for work focusing on the topic of how certain viruses evade the control of the immune system. In 2018 he received a 1.5 million EUR grant from the DFG for a so-called "Reinhart Koselleck project" addressing the function of the immune system in and on the surface of cells. He was also co-founder and board member of the Cluster of Excellence Frankfurt Macromolecular Complexes and director of several research centers, including the Collaborative Research Centers (Sonderforschungsbereiche) SFB 628 and SFB 807. Since 2022 he has headed the research network SFB 1507 on membrane-associated protein assemblies, machines and supercomplexes. In 2023, Tampé received a Schaefer Research Scholar Award of Columbia University.

== Selected publications 2022–2015 ==
- Sušac L, Yuong MT, Thomas C, von Bülow S, O’Brien-Ball C, Santos AM, Fernandes RA, Hummer G, Tampé R, Davis SJ (2022): Structure of a fully assembled tumor-specific T-cell receptor ligated by pMHC. Cell 185, 3201–13. doi:10.1016/j.cell.2022.07.010
- Sánchez MF, Els-Heindl S, Beck-Sickinger AG, Wieneke R, Tampé R (2021): Photo-induced receptor confinement drives ligand-independent GPCR signaling. Science, eabb7657 doi:10.1126/science.abb7657
- Blees A, Januliene D, Hofmann T, Koller N, Schmidt C, Trowitzsch S, Moeller A, Tampé R (2017): Structure of the human MHC-I peptide-loading complex. Nature 551, 525–8. doi:10.1038/nature24627
- Thomas C, Tampé R (2017): Structure of the TAPBPR-MHC I complex defines the mechanism of peptide loading and editing. Science 358, 1060–4. doi:10.1038/nature24627
- Domnick A, Winter C, Sušac L, Hennecke L, Hensen M, Zitzmann N, Trowitzsch S, Thomas C, Tampé R (2022): Molecular basis of MHC I quality control in the peptide loading complex. Nature Communications 13, 4701. doi:10.1038/s41467-022-32384-z
- Müller IK, Winter C, Thomas C, Spaapen RM, Trowitzsch S, Tampé R (2022): Structure of an MHC I-tapasin-ERp57 editing complex defines chaperone promiscuity. Nature Communications , 13, 5283. doi:10.1038/s41467-022-32841-9
- Nürenberg-Goloub E, Kratzat H, Heilemann H, Heuer A, Kötter P, Berninghausen O, Becker T, Tampé R, Beckmann R (2020): Molecular analysis of the ribosome recycling factor ABCE1 bound to the 30S post-splitting complex. The EMBO Journal, 39, e103788. doi:10.15252/embj.2019103788
- Heuer A, Gerovac M, Schmidt C, Trowitzsch S, Preis A, Kötter P, Berninghausen O, Becker T, Beckmann R, Tampé R (2017): Structure of the 40S-ABCE1 post-splitting complex in ribosome recycling and translation initiation. Nature Structural & Molecular Biology 24, 453–60. doi:10.1038/nsmb.3396
- Hofmann S, Januliene D, Mehdipour AR, Thomas C, Stefan E, Brüchert S, Kuhn BT, Geertsma ER, Hummer G, Tampé R, Moeller A (2019): Conformation space of a heterodimeric ABC exporter under turnover conditions. Nature 471, 580–3. doi:10.1038/s41586-019-1391-0
- Kim JM, Wu S, Tomasiak T, Mergel C, Winter MN, Stiller S, Robles-Colmanares Y, Stroud RM*, Tampé R, Craik CS, Cheng Y (2015): Subnanometre-resolution electron cryomicroscopy structure of a heterodimeric ABC exporter. Nature 517, 396–400. doi:10.1038/nature13872
