= Wayne L. Hubbell =

American biochemist

- Born: March 24, 1943 (age 83)
- Education: Oregon State University, B.S. 1965: Stanford University (Ph.D. 1970); Stanford University (Postdoctoral Fellow)
- Known for: Site-directed spin labeling
- Scientific career
- Fields: Biochemistry of vision
- Institutions: University of California, Los Angeles thesis_title =
- Doctoral students: Linda Columbus

Wayne L. Hubbell (born 24 March 1943) is an American biochemist and member of the National Academy of Sciences. He is Professor of Biochemistry and Jules Stein Professor of Ophthalmology at the University of California, Los Angeles. His research focuses on the visual system, and is primarily supported by a grant from the National Eye Institute.

== Research ==
Dr. Hubbell has studied the relationship between the molecular structure of protein and the conformational changes that control its function. Of particular interest are membrane proteins that behave as "molecular switches", i.e., proteins whose structures are switched to an active state by a physical or chemical signals. An example is light-activated rhodopsin, the visual pigment in photoreceptor cells of the retina. The goal is to elucidate the structure of rhodopsin, the mechanism of the molecular switch, and regulation of this switch by associated proteins, transducin and arrestin.

Dr. Hubbell's research also includes structure and function relationships in water-soluble proteins such as the lens protein, a-crystallin, and the retinoid carrying proteins which transport vitamin A throughout photoreceptor cells.

Dr. Hubbell's laboratory developed site-directed spin labeling (SDSL), a technique for the exploration of protein structure and dynamics. By changing the genetic code, a specific attachment point in the protein is created for a nitroxide spin label probe. Analysis of the electron paramagnetic resonance (EPR) spectrum of the spin label provides information about the local environment in the protein. With a sufficiently large set of labeled proteins, global information on structure is obtained, and most importantly, changes in the structure during function can be followed in real time.

== Education and training ==
- BS, Oregon State University, 1965
- Ph.D., Stanford University, 1970
- AFORSR-NRC Postdoctoral Fellow, Chemistry, Stanford University

== Awards and honors ==
- Westinghouse Science Talent Search Finalist, 1961
- Alfred P. Sloan Foundation Fellow, 1973
- Camille and Henry Dreyfus Foundation Teacher-Scholar Award, 1975–80
- Research to Prevent Blindness Senior Investigator Award, 1990
- National Institutes of Health MERIT Award, 1990
- Biophysical Society's Elisabeth Roberts Cole Award, 1991
- Alcon Research Institute Award, 1994
- Alexander M. Cruickshank Lecturer, 1997
- Honorary degree, University of Pécs, Hungary, 1998
- Fellow of the Biophysical Society, 2000 (first class)
- Gold Medal, International EPR Society, 2000
- International Zavoisky Award in EPR, 2003
- Fellow, American Academy of Arts and Sciences, 2001
- Bruker Prize, Royal Society of Chemistry-ESR Group, 2004
- Member of the National Academy of Sciences, 2005
- Christian B. Anfinsen Award, 2009
