= CEF =

CEF may refer to for:

== Military ==
- Canadian Expeditionary Force, in the First World War
- Chinese Expeditionary Force, during the Burma Campaign of World War II
- Czech Air Force, ICAO airline code
- French Expeditionary Corps (1943–44) (corps expéditionnaire français), operating in Italy
- Westover Air Reserve Base in Massachusetts

== Finance and economics ==
- Caixa Econômica Federal, a Brazilian bank
- Closed-end fund, a collective investment model
- Connecting Europe Facility, a European Union fund

== Technology ==
- Chromium Embedded Framework, an open-source software framework
- Cisco Express Forwarding, a switching technology
- Cluster of Excellence Frankfurt Macromolecular Complexes, a nanotechnology institution

== Transport ==
- Chapel-en-le-Frith railway station, in Derbyshire, England
- Westover Metropolitan Airport, in Massachusetts
- Constructions électriques de France

== Other uses ==
- Bishops' Conference of France (French: Conférence des évêques de France)
- Central Experimental Farm, Ottawa, Canada
- Child Evangelism Fellowship, an international Christian nonprofit organization
- Common European Framework of Reference for Languages
- Conseil des écoles fransaskoises, a school board in Saskatchewan, Canada
- Conservative European Forum, a British political organisation
