= SDSL =

SDSL may refer to:

- Symmetric digital subscriber line
- Site-directed spin labeling
