= Electron resonance imaging =

Method of visualizing living animals

Electron resonance imaging (ERI) is a preclinical imaging method, together with positron emission tomography (PET), computed tomography scan (CT scan), magnetic resonance imaging (MRI), and other techniques. ERI is dedicated to imaging small laboratory animals, and its unique feature is the ability to detect free radicals. This technique could also be used for other purposes, such as material science, quality of food, etc.

For in vivo imaging purposes, ERI is a minimally invasive method. It requires an intravenous injection of external substances called spin probes (usually nitroxide or triarylmethyl compounds). The main advantage of ERI modality is the ability to map the tissue microenvironment parameters, e.g., oxygen partial pressure (pO2), redox status, oxidative stress, thiol concentration, pH, inorganic phosphorus, viscosity, etc. ERI is commonly used to research in the areas of oncology, neurodegenerative disorders, and drug development.

== Origin ==
ERI is a preclinical application of electron paramagnetic resonance imaging (EPRI). The term "ERI" was introduced to distinguish a commercial device from EPRI devices normally used in the academic domain.

Electron paramagnetic resonance (EPR) spectroscopy is dedicated to researching substances with unpaired electrons. It was first introduced in 1944, approximately the same time as a similar phenomenon - nuclear magnetic resonance (NMR). Owing to hardware and software limitations, EPR was not developing as rapidly as NMR. This led to a huge gap between these two methods. Therefore, to underline a breakthrough in preclinical imaging by presenting EPRI as a complementary method to the present ones, the term "ERI" was introduced.

== In vivo applications ==
=== Oxygen imaging ===
One of the many possible applications of ERI is the ability to measure the absolute value of oxygen. The width of the EPR signal from oxygen-sensitive spin probes depends linearly on tissue oxygen concentration. Therefore, the information about the oxygen value is collected directly from the examined areas. Oxygen mapping is commonly used to plan and improve the effectiveness of radiotherapy treatments. Trityl spin probes are the most suitable for use in oxygen imaging.

=== Redox status and oxidative stress ===
The unique property of ERI is the ability to track reactive oxygen species (ROS). Those particles are versatile and are constantly generated in living organisms. ROS plays a special role in oxidative and reduction mechanisms. In a normal physiological state, the number of ROS is controlled by antioxidants. Factors that increase the number of ROS (e.g., ionizing radiation, metal ions, etc.) will cause their overproduction. Therefore, this state leads to an imbalance between those particles and is called oxidative stress.

=== Pharmacokinetics ===
ERI allows for dynamic measurements and 3D tracking of the spin probe. In this case, the term "dynamics" refers to the fast repetition of the imaging process and the tracking of changes in the signal intensity for each location imaged over time. Due to the method's high temporal resolution and sensitivity, it is possible to distinguish both the inflow and outflow phases of the spin probe, the bio-distribution, and the time to reach a maximum concentration of the spin probe.

=== Spin probes ===
In natural conditions, free radicals are characterised by an extremely short lifespan, so to capture the EPR signal, an external molecule with a stable free radical must be delivered. Usually, it happens when an injection is made into the animal's body. Two main classes of spin probes are used for imaging: nitroxide and triaryl methyl (TAM, trityl) radicals.

Nitroxide radicals are sensitive to oxygen concentration, pH, thiol concentrations, viscosity, and polarity. The issue with these spin probes is their fast reduction, which sometimes leads to loss of the EPR signal. Triarylmethyl radicals are characterised by far longer lifespans and increased stability towards reducing and oxidising biological agents. They are perfect for measuring oxygen concentration, pH, thiol concentrations, inorganic phosphate, and redox status.

Although the aforementioned spin probes are the most popular choice, many more can be used in ERI. One of many examples is melanin – a polymeric pigment that contains a mixture of eumelanin and pheomelanin. This is the only substance that occurs in natural conditions and allows for the registration of the EPR signal without the need to deliver extraneous spin probes.
