= Beth Levine (physician) =

American microbiologist (1960–2020)

- Born: April 7, 1960; Newark, New Jersey, US
- Died: June 15, 2020 (aged 60)
- Education: Brown University; Cornell University Medical College
- Known for: Identified the mammalian autophagy gene BECN1/beclin 1
- Spouse: Milton Packer
- Children: 2
- Awards: The American Cancer Society Junior Faculty Research Award (1994); election into the American Society of Clinical Investigation (2000); the Ellison Medical Foundation Senior Scholars Award in Global Infectious Diseases (2004); elected member, American Association of Physicians (2005); appointment as a Howard Hughes Medical Institute Investigator (2008); Edith and Peter O’Donnell Award in Medicine (2008); elected fellow, American Association for the Advancement of Science (2012); election into the National Academy of Sciences (2013); election into the Academy of Medicine, Engineering and Science of Texas (2013); the ASCI Stanley J. Korsmeyer Award (2014); Phyllis T. Bodel Women in Medicine Award, Yale University School of Medicine (2018); recipient, Barcroft Medal, Queen’s University Belfast (2018).
- Scientific career
- Workplaces: Johns Hopkins University; Columbia University; UT Southwestern Medical Center

Beth Cindy Levine (April 7, 1960 – June 15, 2020) was an American microbiologist. She was an investigator at the Howard Hughes Medical Institute (HHMI), Professor of Internal Medicine and Microbiology, Director of the Center for Autophagy Research and Charles Cameron Sprague Distinguished Chair in Biomedical Sciences at the University of Texas Southwestern Medical Center. She specialized in the field of autophagy; more specifically in its regulation and its role in diverse diseases, including cancer and infectious diseases. Levine was described as a pioneer in the field of modern mammalian autophagy.

== Biography ==
Beth Levine was born on April 7, 1960, in Newark, New Jersey. She grew up in New Jersey with older brothers, before graduating high school a year early. Levine died at home on June 15, 2020, from breast cancer.

== Education ==
Beth Levine graduated magna cum laude in 1981 with a bachelor's degree in French studies from Brown University. She then went on to complete her M.D. at Cornell University Medical College, New York. She completed her internship and residency in Internal Medicine at Mount Sinai Hospital in New York City. While there, she published a study called "Elevated Circulating Levels of Tumor Necrosis Factor in Severe Chronic Heart Failure" with her future husband and cardiologist Dr. Milton Packer. She completed her fellowship in "infectious diseases and the pathogenesis of neurotropic viruses" at Johns Hopkins University, Baltimore.

== Career ==
Beth Levine served as director of virology research at Columbia University from 1994 to 2004. She was recruited to become the chief of infectious diseases at the University of Texas Southwestern Medical Center from 2004 to 2011. She became the director of autophagy research in 2011. She served as a professor of internal medicine and microbiology at the University of Texas Southwestern Medical Center up until the time of her death. Levine created the Gordon Conference on Autophagy in Stress, Development, and Disease in 2003. Since 2008, she served as an investigator with the Howard Hughes Medical Institute. Additionally, she was elected into the American Association of Physicians and the National Academy of Sciences.

In her research, Levine frequently performed cross-disciplinary experiments that opened the door to new areas for investigation. She experimented with a wide array of systems, including yeast, plant, nematode, mouse, and human. Levine discovered the first mammalian autophagy gene, Beclin 1, and later went on to directly associate this gene with the protein Bcl-2. This association provided significant implications in the realm of cell survival.

In a 1999 paper in Nature, she proposed that autophagy was linked to tumor suppression. In 2003, she confirmed the link between Beclin 1 and tumor suppression. Additionally, Levine demonstrated links between autophagy and breast cancer. She also proved a link between autophagy and viral infections, showing how the herpes simplex virus type-1 expressed a protein that blocked Beclin 1 activity. She was also able to show a link between autophagy and lifespan.

Levine and her team also made significant contributions in several selective fields of autophagy, including virophagy, xenophagy, and mitophagy, and she is credited for coining the term xenophagy. These contributions provided a greater understanding of the role of autophagy pathways in diseases like neurodegeneration, inflammatory disorders, and cancers. Levine's lab also worked on developing therapeutics for these diseases, including Tat-Beclin, an autophagy-inducing peptide.

== Awards and honours ==
1994 American Cancer Society Junior Faculty Research Award

2000 Inducted into American Society of Clinical Investigation (ASCI)

2004 Harvey Lecture

2004 Ellison Medical Foundation Senior Scholars Award in Global Infectious Diseases

2006 Membership in American Association of Physicians

2008 Appointed as Howard Hughes Medical Institute Investigator

2008 Edith and Peter O’Donnell Award in Medicine

2012 Fellowship in the American Association for the Advancement of Science

2013 Inducted into National Academy of Sciences

2013 Membership in the Academy of Medicine, Engineering and Science of Texas

2014 ASCI Stanley J. Korsmeyer Award

2018 Phyllis T. Bodel Women in Medicine Award from Yale University of Medicine

2018 Barcroft Medal from Queen’s University Belfast

After Levine's passing, UT Southwestern Medical Center also created an annual award in her honor, called the Beth Levine, M.D. Prize in Autophagy Research.
