= Spin trapping =

Technique for isolating and observing short-lived free radical molecules

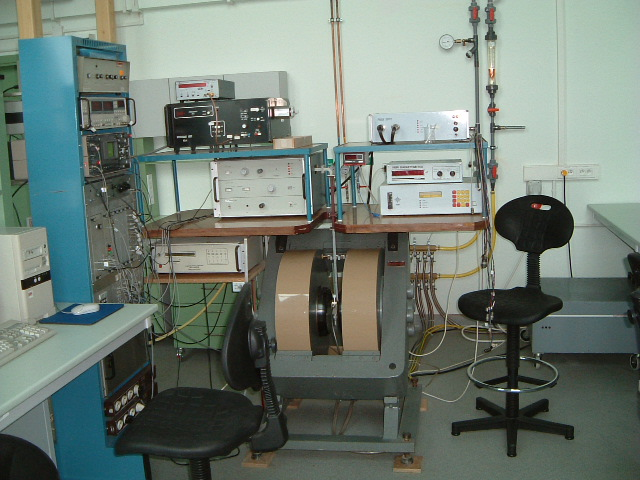
An EPR spectrometer used for spin-trapping technique.

Spin trapping is an analytical technique employed in chemistry and biology for the detection and identification of short-lived free radicals through the use of electron paramagnetic resonance (EPR) spectroscopy. EPR spectroscopy detects paramagnetic species such as the unpaired electrons of free radicals. However, when the half-life of radicals is too short to detect with EPR, compounds known as spin traps are used to react covalently with the radical products and form more stable adduct that will also have paramagnetic resonance spectra detectable by EPR spectroscopy. The use of radical-addition reactions to detect short-lived radicals was developed by several independent groups by 1968.

== Spin traps ==
Spin trapping with phenyl N-t-butylnitrone (PBN); a commonly used spin trap.

Spin trapping with 5,5-dimethyl-1-pyrroline-N-oxide (DMPO); another common spin trap.

The most commonly used spin traps are alpha-phenyl N-tertiary-butyl nitrone (PBN) and 5,5-dimethyl-pyrroline N-oxide (DMPO). More rarely, C-nitroso spin traps such as 3,5-dibromo-4-nitrosobenzenesulfonic acid (DBNBS) can be used: often additional hyperfine information is derived, but at a cost of specificity (due to facile non-radical addition of many compounds to C-nitroso species, and subsequent oxidation of the resulting hydroxylamine).

5-Diisopropoxyphosphoryl-5-methyl-1-pyrroline-N-oxide (DIPPMPO) spin trapping has been used in measuring superoxide production in mitochondria.

A comprehensive list of Spin Trapping molecules is maintained by the IUPAC.

== Radical detection ==
A common method for spin-trapping involves the addition of radical to a nitrone spin trap resulting in the formation of a spin adduct, a nitroxide-based persistent radical, that can be detected using EPR. The spin adduct usually yields a distinctive EPR spectrum characteristic of a particular free radical that is trapped. The identity of the radical can be inferred based on the EPR spectral profile of their respective spin adducts such as the g value, but most importantly, the hyperfine-coupling constants of relevant nuclei. Unambiguous assignments of the identity of the trapped radical can often be made by using stable isotope substitution of the radicals parent compound, so that further hyperfine couplings are introduced or altered.

== Advances ==
The radical adduct (or products such as the hydroxylamine) can often be stable enough to allow non-EPR detection techniques. The groups of London, and Berliner & Khramtsov have used NMR to study such adducts and Timmins and co-workers used charge changes upon DBNBS trapping to isolate protein adducts for study. A major advance has been the development of anti-DMPO antibodies by Mason's group, allowing study of spin trapping reactions by a simple immuno-based techniques.

== See also ==
- Spin label
