= Buchmann Institute for Molecular Life Sciences =

German research institute

The Buchmann Institute for Molecular Life Sciences (BMLS) is an interdisciplinary research institute located on Riedberg Campus of Goethe University Frankfurt in Frankfurt am Main, Germany. The research building with 3000 m^{2} of laboratory (70%) and office (30%) space was completed in 2011. BMLS houses most of the professorships appointed by the Cluster of Excellence Frankfurt as well as several junior research groups. It represents a highly international and interdisciplinary environment, bridging activities of four of the CEF-associated faculties of Goethe University, including biochemistry, chemistry, biosciences, physics and medicine. Around 180 people from over 20 nationalities are working in BMLS.

The Frankfurt Center for Advanced Light Microscopy and the Frankfurt Center for Electron Microscopy are located in the BMLS.
