= Electrically detected magnetic resonance =

Electrically detected magnetic resonance (EDMR) is a materials characterisation technique that improves upon electron spin resonance. It involves measuring the change in electrical resistance of a sample when exposed to certain microwave frequencies. It can be used to identify very small numbers (down to a few hundred atoms) of impurities in semiconductors.

== Outline of technique ==
A band structure (energy level) outline of the EDMR mechanism. A donor impurity (P) sits just below the conduction band (C). An acceptor (R) sits between the donor and the valence band and provides a recombination pathway for the donor electron (small blue circle) to recombine with a hole in the valence band (V). A photon (γ) of a specific frequency can flip spins against the magnetic field (B).

To perform a pulsed EDMR experiment, the system is first initialised by placing it in a magnetic field. This orients the spins of the electrons occupying the donor and acceptor in the direction of the magnetic field. To study the donor, we apply a microwave pulse ("γ" in the diagram) at a resonant frequency of the donor. This flips the spin of the electron on the donor. The donor electron can then decay to the acceptor energy state (it was forbidden from doing that before it was flipped due to the Pauli exclusion principle) and from there to the valence band, where it recombines with a hole. With more recombination, there will be fewer conduction electrons in the conduction band and a corresponding increase in the resistance, which can be directly measured. Above-bandgap light is used throughout the experiment to ensure that there are many electrons in the conduction band.

By scanning the frequency of the microwave pulse, we can find which frequencies are resonant, and with knowledge of the strength of the magnetic field, we can identify the donor's energy levels from the resonant frequency and knowledge of the Zeeman effect. The donor's energy levels act as a 'fingerprint' by which we can identify the donor and its local electronic environment. By changing the frequency slightly, we can study the acceptor instead.

== Recent developments ==
EDMR has been demonstrated on a single electron from a quantum dot. Measurements of less than 100 donors and theoretical analyses of such a measurement have been published, relying on the P_{b} interface defect to act as the acceptor.
