= G-strain =

In EPR spectroscopy, g-strain refers to broadening of g-values owing to small sample inhomogeneity owing to slight variations in the orientation of the paramagnetic centers. The phenomenon is indicated by broadening of the g-values that depends on the frequency of the spectrometer, such as X- or Q-band. If the line width were determined only by hyperfine coupling (which are field-independent), then the line widths would also be field independent, but they often are not. In iron-sulfur proteins, some other metalloproteins, as well as some solids, g-strain can be substantial.
