= EMG1 =

Protein-coding gene in the species Homo sapiens

Identifiers
- Aliases: EMG1, C2F, Grcc2f, NEP1, N1-specific pseudouridine methyltransferase, EMG1 N1-specific pseudouridine methyltransferase
- External IDs: OMIM: 611531; MGI: 1315195; GeneCards: EMG1
Available structures
PDB	Ortholog search: PDBe RCSB
PDB	List of PDB id codes 5FAI

Gene location (Mouse)
Chr.	Chromosome 6 (mouse)
Band	6 F2|6 59.17 cM	Start	124,681,048 bp
Band	6 F2|6 59.17 cM	End	124,689,141 bp
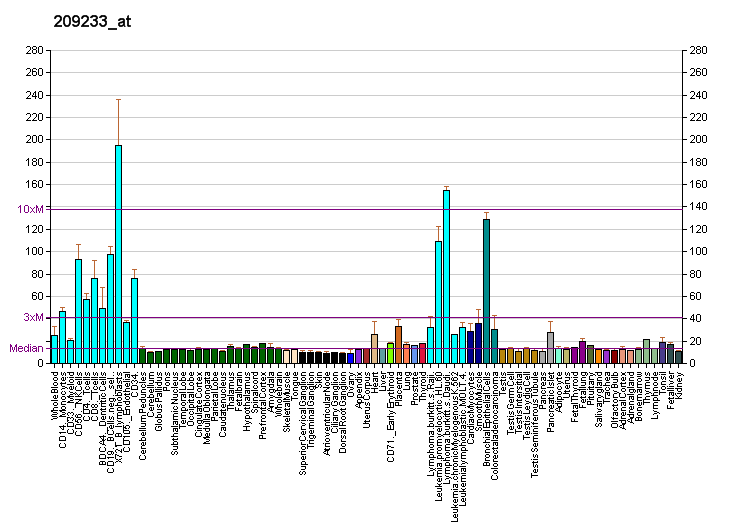
RNA expression pattern
Bgee	Human / Mouse (ortholog); Top expressed in: islet of Langerhans; stromal cell of endometrium; left ventricle; right adrenal gland; right lobe of thyroid gland; appendix; left uterine tube; left lobe of thyroid gland; oocyte; left adrenal gland / Top expressed in: medial ganglionic eminence; mandibular prominence; maxillary prominence; somite; endocardial cushion; thymus; fetal liver hematopoietic progenitor cell; abdominal wall; epiblast; migratory enteric neural crest cell; More reference expression data
BioGPS	More reference expression data
Gene ontology
Molecular function	methyltransferase activity; transferase activity; rRNA binding; protein binding; rRNA (pseudouridine) methyltransferase activity; RNA binding
Cellular component	cytoplasm; small-subunit processome; nucleoplasm; nucleus; nucleolus
Biological process	rRNA base methylation; methylation; ribosomal small subunit biogenesis; ribosome biogenesis; maturation of SSU-rRNA from tricistronic rRNA transcript (SSU-rRNA, 5.8S rRNA, LSU-rRNA); rRNA processing; blastocyst development; nucleologenesis
Sources:Amigo / QuickGO
Orthologs
Databases	NCBI: entry
Species	Human	Mouse
Entrez	10436	14791
Ensembl	n/a	ENSMUSG00000004268
UniProt	Q92979	O35130
RefSeq (mRNA)	NM_006331; NM_001320049	NM_013536
RefSeq (protein)	NP_001306978; NP_006322	NP_038564
Location (UCSC)	n/a	Chr 6: 124.68 – 124.69 Mb
PubMed search
- Wikidata
View/Edit Human	View/Edit Mouse

Probable ribosome biogenesis protein NEP1 or EMG1 is a protein that in humans is encoded by the EMG1 gene. A D86G mutation in the protein has been associated with Bowen-Conradi syndrome.
