= RRNA small subunit pseudouridine methyltransferase Nep1 =

Identifiers
- EC no.: 2.1.1.260

Databases
- IntEnz: IntEnz view
- BRENDA: BRENDA entry
- ExPASy: NiceZyme view
- KEGG: KEGG entry
- MetaCyc: metabolic pathway
- PRIAM: profile
- PDB structures: RCSB PDB PDBe PDBsum
Search
- PMC: articles
- PubMed: articles
- NCBI: proteins

RRNA small subunit pseudouridine methyltransferase Nep1 (EC 2.1.1.260, Nep1, nucleolar essential protein 1) is an enzyme with systematic name S-adenosyl-L-methionine:18S rRNA (pseudouridine^{1191}-N^{1})-methyltransferase. This enzyme catalyses the following chemical reaction

S-adenosyl-L-methionine + pseudouridine^{1191} in yeast 18S rRNA $\rightleftharpoons$ S-adenosyl-L-homocysteine + N^{1}-methylpseudouridine^{1191} in yeast 18S rRNA

This enzyme recognizes specific pseudouridine residues (Psi) in small subunits of ribosomal RNA based on the local RNA structure.

A point mutation in the ribosome biogenesis factor Nep1 impairs its nucleolar localisation and RNA binding and causes the Bowen-Conradi syndrome. .
