= Bowen–Conradi syndrome =

- Other names: BCS or BWCNS

Bowen–Conradi syndrome is a disease in humans that can affect children. The disease is due to an autosomal recessive abnormality of the EMG1 gene, which plays a role in small ribosomal subunit (SSU) assembly. The preponderance of diagnoses has been in North American Hutterite children, but BWCNS can affect other population groups.

BWCNS is a ribosomopathy. A D86G mutation of EMG1 destroys an EcoRV restriction endonuclease site in the most highly conserved region of the protein.

Skeletal dysmorphology is seen and severe prenatal and postnatal growth failure usually leads to death by one year of age.
