= Spin probe =

A spin probe is a molecule with stable free radical character that carries a functional group. This group can be used to couple the probe to another molecule, e.g. a biomolecule.

Electron spin resonance can be employed to quantify the probe's concentration.
