= Site-directed spin labeling =

Site-directed spin labeling (SDSL) is a technique for investigating the structure and local dynamics of proteins using electron spin resonance. The theory of SDSL is based on the specific reaction of spin labels with amino acids. A spin label's built-in protein structure can be detected by EPR spectroscopy. SDSL is also a useful tool in examinations of the protein folding process.

== Spin labeling ==
EPR spectrum of proxyl-MTS spin labeled yeast iso-1-cytochrome c. Spin label is attached to Cysteine 102 residue.

Site-directed spin labeling (SDSL) was pioneered in the laboratory of Dr. W.L. Hubbell. In SDSL, sites for attachment of spin labels are introduced into recombinantly expressed proteins by site-directed mutagenesis. Functional groups contained within the spin label determine their specificity. At neutral pH, protein thiol groups specifically react with the functional groups methanethiosulfonate, maleimide, and iodoacetamide, creating a covalent bond with the amino acid Cys. Spin labels are a unique molecular reporter, in that they are paramagnetic (contain an unpaired electron). Spin labels were first synthesized in the laboratory of H. M. McConnell in 1965. Since then, a variety of nitroxide spin labels have enjoyed widespread use for the study of macromolecular structure and dynamics because of their stability and simple EPR signal. The nitroxyl radical (N-O) is usually incorporated into a heterocyclic ring (e.g. pyrrolidine), and the unpaired electron is predominantly localized to the N-O bond. Once incorporated into the protein, a spin label's motions are dictated by its local environment. Because spin labels are exquisitely sensitive to motion, this has profound effects on its EPR spectrum.

The assembly of multi-subunit membrane protein complexes has also been studied using spin labeling. The binding of the PsaC subunit to the PsaA and PsaB subunits of the photosynthetic reaction center, Photosystem I, has been analyzed in great detail using this technique.

Dr. Ralf Langen's group showed that SDSL with EPR (University of Southern California, Los Angeles) can be used to understand the structure of amyloid fibrils and the structure of membrane bound Parkinson's disease protein alpha-synuclein. A 2012 study generated a high resolution structure of IAPP fibrils using a combination of SDSL, pulse EPR and computational biology.
