= Spin label =

EPR spectrum of a spin label

A spin label (SL) is an organic molecule which possesses an unpaired electron, usually on a nitrogen atom, and the ability to bind to another molecule. Spin labels are normally used as tools for probing proteins or biological membrane-local dynamics using electron paramagnetic resonance spectroscopy. The site-directed spin labeling (SDSL) technique allows one to monitor a specific region within a protein. In protein structure examinations, amino acid-specific SLs can be used.

The goal of spin labeling is somewhat similar to that of isotopic substitution in NMR spectroscopy. There one replaces an atom lacking a nuclear spin (and so is NMR-silent) with an isotope having a spin I ≠ 0 (and so is NMR-active). This technique is useful for tracking the chemical environment around an atom when full substitution with an NMR-active isotope is not feasible. Recently, spin-labelling has also been used to probe chemical local environment in NMR itself, in a technique known as Paramagnetic Relaxation Enhancement (PRE).

Recent developments in the theory and experimental measurement of PREs have enabled the detection, characterization and visualization of sparsely populated states of proteins and their complexes. Such states, which are invisible to conventional biophysical and structural techniques, play a key role in many biological processes including molecular recognition, allostery, macromolecular assembly and aggregation.

== Applications of spin EPR ==
Spin labelled fatty acids have been extensively used to understand dynamic organization of lipids in bio-membranes and membrane biophysics. For example, stearic acid labelled with aminoxyl spin label moiety at various carbons (5, 7, 9, 12, 13, 14 and 16) with respect to first carbon of carbonyl group have been used to study the flexibility gradient of membrane lipids to understand membrane fluidity conditions at different depths of their lipid bilayer organization.

== See also ==
- Spin trapping
