= Xenophagy =

Changes in patterns of biological consumption

Xenophagy (Greek "strange" + "eating") and allotrophy (Greek "other" + "nutrient") are changes in established patterns of biological consumption, by individuals or groups.

- In entomology, xenophagy is a categorical change in diet, such as an herbivore becoming carnivorous, a predator becoming necrophagous, a coprophage becoming necrophagous or carnivorous, or a reversal of such changes. Allotrophy is a less extreme change in diet, such as in the case of the seven-spot ladybird, which can diversify a diet of aphids to sometimes include pollen. There are several apparent cases of allotrophy in Israeli Longitarsus beetles.
- In microbiology, xenophagy is the process by which a cell directs autophagy against pathogens, as reflected in the study of antiviral defenses. Cellular xenophagy is an innate component of immune responses, though the general importance of xenophagy is not yet certain.
- In ecology, allotrophy is also reflected in eutrophication, being a change in nutrient source such as an aquatic ecosystem that starts receiving new nutrients from drainage of the surrounding land.
