= List of Nobel laureates in Physiology or Medicine =

Front side (obverse) of the Nobel Prize Medal for Physiology or Medicine

The Nobel Prize in Physiology or Medicine (Swedish: Nobelpriset i fysiologi eller medicin) is awarded annually by the Swedish Karolinska Institute to scientists in the various fields of physiology or medicine. It is one of the five Nobel Prizes established by the 1895 will of Alfred Nobel (who died in 1896), awarded for outstanding contributions in chemistry, physics, literature, peace, and physiology or medicine. As dictated by Nobel's will, the award is administered by the Nobel Foundation and awarded by a committee that consists of five members and an executive secretary elected by the Karolinska Institute. While commonly referred to as the Nobel Prize in Medicine, Nobel specifically stated that the prize be awarded for "physiology or medicine" in his will. Because of this, the prize can be awarded in a broader range of fields. The first Nobel Prize in Physiology or Medicine was awarded in 1901 to Emil Adolf von Behring, of Germany. Each recipient receives a medal, a diploma and a monetary award that has varied throughout the years. In 1901, von Behring received 150,782 SEK, which was equal to 7,731,004 SEK in December 2008. The award is presented in Stockholm at an annual ceremony on 10 December, the anniversary of Nobel's death.

Laureates have won the Nobel Prize in a wide range of fields that relate to physiology or medicine. As of 2009, 8 Prizes have been awarded for contributions in the field of signal transduction by G proteins and second messengers, 13 have been awarded for contributions in the field of neurobiology and 13 have been awarded for contributions in intermediary metabolism. In 1939 Gerhard Domagk, a German, was not allowed by his government to accept the prize. He later received a medal and diploma, but not the money. As of 2024, the prize has been awarded to 229 individuals, thirteen of them were women (Gerty Cori being the first to be awarded in 1947).

There have been nine years in which the Nobel Prize in Physiology or Medicine was not awarded (1915–1918, 1921, 1925, 1940–1942). There were also five years for which the Nobel Prize in Physiology or Medicine was delayed for one year. The Prize was not awarded in 1914, as the Nobel Committee for Physiology or Medicine decided that none of that year's nominations met the necessary criteria, but was awarded to Robert Bárány in 1915 and counted as the 1914 prize. This precedent was followed for the 1922 prize awarded to Archibald Hill and Otto Fritz Meyerhof in 1923, the 1926 prize awarded to Johannes Fibiger in 1927, the 1938 prize awarded to Corneille Heymans in 1939, and the 1943 prize awarded to Henrik Dam and Edward Adelbert Doisy in 1944.

== Laureates ==
Year	Laureate^{[A]}		Nationality^{[B]}	Rationale^{[C]}	Ref
1901		Emil von Behring (1854–1917)	Germany	"for his work on serum therapy, especially its application against diphtheria, by which he has opened a new road in the domain of medical science and thereby placed in the hands of the physician a victorious weapon against illness and deaths"	
1902		Ronald Ross (1857–1932)	United Kingdom	"for his work on malaria, by which he has shown how it enters the organism and thereby has laid the foundation for successful research on this disease and methods of combating it"	
1903		Niels Ryberg Finsen (1860–1904)	Faroe Islands	"[for] his contribution to the treatment of diseases, especially lupus vulgaris, with concentrated light radiation, whereby he has opened a new avenue for medical science"	
1904		Ivan Pavlov (1849–1936)	Russia	"in recognition of his work on the physiology of digestion, through which knowledge on vital aspects of the subject has been transformed and enlarged"	
1905		Robert Koch (1843–1910)	Germany	"for his investigations and discoveries in relation to tuberculosis"	
1906		Camillo Golgi (1843–1926)	Italy	"in recognition of their work on the structure of the nervous system"	
1906		Santiago Ramón y Cajal (1852–1934)	Spain	"in recognition of their work on the structure of the nervous system"	
1907		Charles Louis Alphonse Laveran (1845–1922)	France	"in recognition of his work on the role played by protozoa in causing diseases"	
1908		Paul Ehrlich (1854–1915)	Germany	"in recognition of their work on immunity"	
1908		Élie Metchnikoff (1845–1916)	Russia	"in recognition of their work on immunity"	
1909		Emil Theodor Kocher (1841–1917)	Switzerland	"for his work on the physiology, pathology and surgery of the thyroid gland"	
1910		Albrecht Kossel (1853–1927)	Germany	"in recognition of the contributions to our knowledge of cell chemistry made through his work on proteins, including the nucleic substances"	
1911		Allvar Gullstrand (1862–1930)	Sweden	"for his work on the dioptrics of the eye"	
1912		Alexis Carrel (1873–1944)	France	"[for] his work on vascular suture and the transplantation of blood vessels and organs"	
1913		Charles Richet (1850–1935)	France	"[for] his work on anaphylaxis"	
1914		Robert Bárány (1876–1936)	Austria-Hungary	"for his work on the physiology and pathology of the vestibular apparatus"	
1915	Not awarded				
1916	Not awarded				
1917	Not awarded				
1918	Not awarded				
1919		Jules Bordet (1870–1961)	Belgium	"for his discoveries relating to immunity"	
1920		August Krogh (1874–1949)	Denmark	"for his discovery of the capillary motor regulating mechanism"	
1921	Not awarded				
1922		Archibald Hill (1886–1977)	United Kingdom	"for his discovery relating to the production of heat in the muscle"	
1922		Otto Fritz Meyerhof (1884–1951)	Germany	"for his discovery of the fixed relationship between the consumption of oxygen and the metabolism of lactic acid in the muscle"	
1923		Frederick Banting (1891–1941)	Canada	"for the discovery of insulin"	
1923		John Macleod (1876–1935)	United Kingdom	"for the discovery of insulin"	
1924		Willem Einthoven (1860–1927)	Netherlands	"for the discovery of the mechanism of the electrocardiogram"	
1925	Not awarded				
1926		Johannes Fibiger (1867–1928)	Denmark	"for his discovery of the Spiroptera carcinoma"	
1927		Julius Wagner-Jauregg (1857–1940)	Austria	"for his discovery of the therapeutic value of malaria inoculation in the treatment of dementia paralytica"	
1928		Charles Nicolle (1866–1936)	France	"for his work on typhus"	
1929		Christiaan Eijkman (1868–1930)	Netherlands	"for his discovery of the antineuritic vitamin"	
1929		Frederick Gowland Hopkins (1861–1947)	United Kingdom	"for his discovery of the growth-stimulating vitamins"	
1930		Karl Landsteiner (1868–1943)	Austria; United States	"for his discovery of human blood groups"	
1931		Otto Heinrich Warburg (1883–1970)	Germany	"for his discovery of the nature and mode of action of the respiratory enzyme"	
1932		Edgar Adrian (1889–1977)	United Kingdom	"for their discoveries regarding the functions of neurons"	
1932		Charles Scott Sherrington (1857–1952)	United Kingdom	"for their discoveries regarding the functions of neurons"	
1933		Thomas Hunt Morgan (1866–1945)	United States	"for his discoveries concerning the role played by the chromosome in heredity"	
1934		George Minot (1885–1950)	United States	"for their discoveries concerning liver therapy in cases of anaemia"	
1934		William P. Murphy (1892–1987)	United States	"for their discoveries concerning liver therapy in cases of anaemia"	
1934		George Whipple (1878–1976)	United States	"for their discoveries concerning liver therapy in cases of anaemia"	
1935		Hans Spemann (1869–1941)	Germany	was awarded a Nobel Prize in Physiology or Medicine in 1935 for his student Hilde Mangold's discovery of the effect now known as embryonic induction, an influence, exercised by various parts of the embryo, that directs the development of groups of cells into particular tissues and organs, the start of artificial cloning of organisms. Spemann added his name as an author to Hilde Mangold's dissertation (although she objected).	
1936		Henry Hallett Dale (1875–1968)	United Kingdom	"for their discoveries relating to chemical transmission of nerve impulses"	
1936		Otto Loewi (1873–1961)	Germany	"for their discoveries relating to chemical transmission of nerve impulses"	
1937		Albert Szent-Györgyi (1893–1986)	Hungary	"for his discoveries in connection with the biological combustion processes, with special reference to vitamin C and the catalysis of fumaric acid"	
1938		Corneille Heymans (1892–1968)	Belgium	"for the discovery of the role played by the sinus and aortic mechanisms in the regulation of respiration"	
1939		Gerhard Domagk (1895–1964)	Germany	"for the discovery of the antibacterial effects of prontosil"	
1940	Not awarded				
1941	Not awarded				
1942	Not awarded				
1943		Henrik Dam (1895–1976)	Denmark	"for his discovery of vitamin K"	
1943		Edward Adelbert Doisy (1893–1986)	United States	"for his discovery of the chemical nature of vitamin K"	
1944		Joseph Erlanger (1874–1965)	United States	"for their discoveries relating to the highly differentiated functions of single nerve fibres"	
1944		Herbert Spencer Gasser (1888–1963)	United States	"for their discoveries relating to the highly differentiated functions of single nerve fibres"	
1945		Ernst Chain (1906–1979)	United Kingdom	"for the discovery of penicillin and its curative effect in various infectious diseases"	
1945		Alexander Fleming (1881–1955)	United Kingdom	"for the discovery of penicillin and its curative effect in various infectious diseases"	
1945		Howard Florey (1898–1968)	Australia	"for the discovery of penicillin and its curative effect in various infectious diseases"	
1946		Hermann Joseph Muller (1890–1967)	United States	"for the discovery of the production of mutations by means of X-ray irradiation"	
1947		Carl Ferdinand Cori (1896–1984)	Czechoslovakia; United States	"for their discovery of the course of the catalytic conversion of glycogen"	
1947		Gerty Cori (1896–1957)	Czechoslovakia; United States	"for their discovery of the course of the catalytic conversion of glycogen"	
1947		Bernardo Houssay (1887–1971)	Argentina	"for his discovery of the part played by the hormone of the anterior pituitary lobe in the metabolism of sugar"	
1948		Paul Hermann Müller (1899–1965)	Switzerland	"for his discovery of the high efficiency of DDT as a contact poison against several arthropods"	
1949		Walter Rudolf Hess (1881–1973)	Switzerland	"for his discovery of the functional organization of the interbrain as a coordinator of the activities of the internal organs"	
1949		António Egas Moniz (1874–1955)	Portugal	"for his discovery of the therapeutic value of leucotomy (lobotomy) in certain psychoses"	
1950		Philip Showalter Hench (1896–1965)	United States	"for their discoveries relating to the hormones of the adrenal cortex, their structure and biological effects"	
1950		Edward Calvin Kendall (1886–1972)	United States	"for their discoveries relating to the hormones of the adrenal cortex, their structure and biological effects"	
1950		Tadeus Reichstein (1897–1996)	Poland; Switzerland	"for their discoveries relating to the hormones of the adrenal cortex, their structure and biological effects"	
1951		Max Theiler (1899–1972)	South Africa; United States	"for his discoveries concerning yellow fever and how to combat it"	
1952		Selman Waksman (1888–1973)	United States	"for his discovery of streptomycin, the first antibiotic effective against tuberculosis"	
1953		Hans Adolf Krebs (1900–1981)	United Kingdom; West Germany	"for his discovery of the citric acid cycle"	
1953		Fritz Albert Lipmann (1899–1986)	United States	"for his discovery of co-enzyme A and its importance for intermediary metabolism"	
1954		John Franklin Enders (1897–1985)	United States	"for their discovery of the ability of poliomyelitis viruses to grow in cultures of various types of tissue"	
1954		Frederick Chapman Robbins (1916–2003)	United States	"for their discovery of the ability of poliomyelitis viruses to grow in cultures of various types of tissue"	
1954		Thomas Huckle Weller (1915–2008)	United States	"for their discovery of the ability of poliomyelitis viruses to grow in cultures of various types of tissue"	
1955		Hugo Theorell (1903–1982)	Sweden	"for his discoveries concerning the nature and mode of action of oxidation enzymes"	
1956		André Frédéric Cournand (1895–1988)	France; United States	"for their discoveries concerning heart catheterization and pathological changes in the circulatory system"	
1956		Werner Forssmann (1904–1979)	West Germany	"for their discoveries concerning heart catheterization and pathological changes in the circulatory system"	
1956		Dickinson W. Richards (1895–1973)	United States	"for their discoveries concerning heart catheterization and pathological changes in the circulatory system"	
1957		Daniel Bovet (1907–1992)	Italy; Switzerland	"for his discoveries relating to synthetic compounds that inhibit the action of certain body substances, and especially their action on the vascular system and the skeletal muscles"	
1958		Joshua Lederberg (1925–2008)	United States	"for his discoveries concerning genetic recombination and the organization of the genetic material of bacteria"	
1958		George Wells Beadle (1903–1989)	United States	"for their discovery that genes act by regulating definite chemical events"	
1958		Edward Lawrie Tatum (1909–1975)	United States	"for their discovery that genes act by regulating definite chemical events"	
1959		Arthur Kornberg (1918–2007)	United States	"for their discovery of the mechanisms in the biological synthesis of ribonucleic acid and deoxyribonucleic acid"	
1959		Severo Ochoa (1905–1993)	Spain; United States	"for their discovery of the mechanisms in the biological synthesis of ribonucleic acid and deoxyribonucleic acid"	
1960		Frank Macfarlane Burnet (1899–1985)	Australia	"for discovery of acquired immunological tolerance"	
1960		Peter Medawar (1915–1987)	United Kingdom	"for discovery of acquired immunological tolerance"	
1961		Georg von Békésy (1899–1972)	Hungary; United States	"for his discoveries of the physical mechanism of stimulation within the cochlea"	
1962		Francis Crick (1916–2004)	United Kingdom	"for their discoveries concerning the molecular structure of nucleic acids and its significance for information transfer in living material"	
1962		James Watson (1928–2025)	United States	"for their discoveries concerning the molecular structure of nucleic acids and its significance for information transfer in living material"	
1962		Maurice Wilkins (1916–2004)	New Zealand; United Kingdom	"for their discoveries concerning the molecular structure of nucleic acids and its significance for information transfer in living material"	
1963		John Eccles (1903–1997)	Australia	"for their discoveries concerning the ionic mechanisms involved in excitation and inhibition in the peripheral and central portions of the nerve cell membrane"	
1963		Alan Lloyd Hodgkin (1914–1998)	United Kingdom	"for their discoveries concerning the ionic mechanisms involved in excitation and inhibition in the peripheral and central portions of the nerve cell membrane"	
1963		Andrew Huxley (1917–2012)	United Kingdom	"for their discoveries concerning the ionic mechanisms involved in excitation and inhibition in the peripheral and central portions of the nerve cell membrane"	
1964		Konrad Bloch (1912–2000)	United States	"for their discoveries concerning the mechanism and regulation of the cholesterol and fatty acid metabolism"	
1964		Feodor Lynen (1911–1979)	West Germany	"for their discoveries concerning the mechanism and regulation of the cholesterol and fatty acid metabolism"	
1965		François Jacob (1920–2013)	France	"for their discoveries concerning genetic control of enzyme and virus synthesis"	
1965		André Lwoff (1902–1994)	France	"for their discoveries concerning genetic control of enzyme and virus synthesis"	
1965		Jacques Monod (1910–1976)	France	"for their discoveries concerning genetic control of enzyme and virus synthesis"	
1966		Charles Brenton Huggins (1901–1997)	Canada; United States	"for his discoveries concerning hormonal treatment of prostatic cancer"	
1966		Peyton Rous (1879–1970)	United States	"for his discovery of tumour-inducing viruses"	
1967		Ragnar Granit (1900–1991)	Finland; Sweden	"for their discoveries concerning the primary physiological and chemical visual processes in the eye"	
1967		Haldan Keffer Hartline (1903–1983)	United States	"for their discoveries concerning the primary physiological and chemical visual processes in the eye"	
1967		George Wald (1906–1997)	United States	"for their discoveries concerning the primary physiological and chemical visual processes in the eye"	
1968		Robert W. Holley (1922–1993)	United States	"for their interpretation of the genetic code and its function in protein synthesis"	
1968		Har Gobind Khorana (1922–2011)	India; United States	"for their interpretation of the genetic code and its function in protein synthesis"	
1968		Marshall Nirenberg (1927–2010)	United States	"for their interpretation of the genetic code and its function in protein synthesis"	
1969		Max Delbrück (1906–1981)	United States	"for their discoveries concerning the replication mechanism and the genetic structure of viruses"	
1969		Alfred Hershey (1908–1997)	United States	"for their discoveries concerning the replication mechanism and the genetic structure of viruses"	
1969		Salvador Luria (1912–1991)	Italy; United States	"for their discoveries concerning the replication mechanism and the genetic structure of viruses"	
1970		Julius Axelrod (1912–2004)	United States	"for their discoveries concerning the humoral transmitters in the nerve terminals and the mechanism for their storage, release and inactivation"	
1970		Bernard Katz (1911–2003)	United Kingdom; West Germany	"for their discoveries concerning the humoral transmitters in the nerve terminals and the mechanism for their storage, release and inactivation"	
1970		Ulf von Euler (1905–1983)	Sweden	"for their discoveries concerning the humoral transmitters in the nerve terminals and the mechanism for their storage, release and inactivation"	
1971		Earl Sutherland (1915–1974)	United States	"for his discoveries concerning the mechanisms of the action of hormones"	
1972		Gerald Edelman (1929–2014)	United States	"for their discoveries concerning the chemical structure of antibodies"	
1972		Rodney Porter (1917–1985)	United Kingdom	"for their discoveries concerning the chemical structure of antibodies"	
1973		Konrad Lorenz (1903–1989)	Austria	"for their discoveries concerning organization and elicitation of individual and social behaviour patterns"	
1973		Karl von Frisch (1886–1982)	Austria	"for their discoveries concerning organization and elicitation of individual and social behaviour patterns"	
1973		Nikolaas Tinbergen (1907–1988)	Netherlands	"for their discoveries concerning organization and elicitation of individual and social behaviour patterns"	
1974		Albert Claude (1899–1983)	Belgium; United States	"for their discoveries concerning the structural and functional organization of the cell"	
1974		Christian de Duve (1917–2013)	Belgium	"for their discoveries concerning the structural and functional organization of the cell"	
1974		George Palade (1912–2008)	Romania; United States	"for their discoveries concerning the structural and functional organization of the cell"	
1975		David Baltimore (1938–2025)	United States	"for their discoveries concerning the interaction between tumour viruses and the genetic material of the cell"	
1975		Renato Dulbecco (1914–2012)	Italy; United States	"for their discoveries concerning the interaction between tumour viruses and the genetic material of the cell"	
1975		Howard Martin Temin (1934–1994)	United States	"for their discoveries concerning the interaction between tumour viruses and the genetic material of the cell"	
1976		Baruch Samuel Blumberg (1925–2011)	United States	"for their discoveries concerning new mechanisms for the origin and dissemination of infectious diseases"	
1976		Carleton Gajdusek (1923–2008)	United States	"for their discoveries concerning new mechanisms for the origin and dissemination of infectious diseases"	
1977		Roger Guillemin (1924–2024)	France; United States	"for their discoveries concerning the peptide hormone production of the brain"	
1977		Andrew Schally (1926–2024)	United States	"for their discoveries concerning the peptide hormone production of the brain"	
1977		Rosalyn Yalow (1921–2011)	United States	"for the development of radioimmunoassays of peptide hormones"	
1978		Werner Arber (b. 1929)	Switzerland	"for the discovery of restriction enzymes and their application to problems of molecular genetics"	
1978		Daniel Nathans (1928–1999)	United States	"for the discovery of restriction enzymes and their application to problems of molecular genetics"	
1978		Hamilton O. Smith (1931–2025)	United States	"for the discovery of restriction enzymes and their application to problems of molecular genetics"	
1979		Allan Cormack (1924–1998)	South Africa; United States	"for the development of computer assisted tomography"	
1979		Godfrey Hounsfield (1919–2004)	United Kingdom	"for the development of computer assisted tomography"	
1980		Baruj Benacerraf (1920–2011)	United States; Venezuela	"for their discoveries concerning genetically determined structures on the cell surface that regulate immunological reactions"	
1980		Jean Dausset (1916–2009)	France	"for their discoveries concerning genetically determined structures on the cell surface that regulate immunological reactions"	
1980		George Snell (1903–1996)	United States	"for their discoveries concerning genetically determined structures on the cell surface that regulate immunological reactions"	
1981		Roger Sperry (1913–1994)	United States	"for his discoveries concerning the functional specialization of the cerebral hemispheres"	
1981		David H. Hubel (1926–2013)	United States	"for their discoveries concerning information processing in the visual system"	
1981		Torsten Wiesel (b. 1924)	Sweden	"for their discoveries concerning information processing in the visual system"	
1982		Sune Bergström (1916–2004)	Sweden	"for their discoveries concerning prostaglandins and related biologically active substances"	
1982		Bengt I. Samuelsson (1934–2024)	Sweden	"for their discoveries concerning prostaglandins and related biologically active substances"	
1982		John Vane (1927–2004)	United Kingdom	"for their discoveries concerning prostaglandins and related biologically active substances"	
1983		Barbara McClintock (1902–1992)	United States	"for her discovery of mobile genetic elements"	
1984		Niels Jerne (1911–1994)	Denmark	"for theories concerning the specificity in development and control of the immune system and the discovery of the principle for production of monoclonal antibodies"	
1984		Georges J. F. Köhler (1946–1995)	West Germany	"for theories concerning the specificity in development and control of the immune system and the discovery of the principle for production of monoclonal antibodies"	
1984		César Milstein (1927–2002)	Argentina	"for theories concerning the specificity in development and control of the immune system and the discovery of the principle for production of monoclonal antibodies"	
1985		Michael Brown (b. 1941)	United States	"for their discoveries concerning the regulation of cholesterol metabolism"	
1985		Joseph L. Goldstein (b. 1940)	United States	"for their discoveries concerning the regulation of cholesterol metabolism"	
1986		Stanley Cohen (1922–2020)	United States	"for their discoveries of growth factors"	
1986		Rita Levi-Montalcini (1909–2012)	Italy	"for their discoveries of growth factors"	
1987		Susumu Tonegawa (1939–2026)	Japan	"for his discovery of the genetic principle for generation of antibody diversity"	
1988		James Black (1924–2010)	United Kingdom	"for their discoveries of important principles for drug treatment"	
1988		Gertrude B. Elion (1918–1999)	United States	"for their discoveries of important principles for drug treatment"	
1988		George H. Hitchings (1905–1998)	United States	"for their discoveries of important principles for drug treatment"	
1989		J. Michael Bishop (1936–2026)	United States	"for their discovery of the cellular origin of retroviral oncogenes"	
1989		Harold E. Varmus (b. 1939)	United States	"for their discovery of the cellular origin of retroviral oncogenes"	
1990		Joseph Murray (1919–2012)	United States	"for their discoveries concerning organ and cell transplantation in the treatment of human disease"	
1990		Don Thomas (1920–2012)	United States	"for their discoveries concerning organ and cell transplantation in the treatment of human disease"	
1991		Erwin Neher (b. 1944)	Germany	"for their discoveries concerning the function of single ion channels in cells"	
1991		Bert Sakmann (b. 1942)	Germany	"for their discoveries concerning the function of single ion channels in cells"	
1992		Edmond H. Fischer (1920–2021)	Switzerland; United States	"for their discoveries concerning reversible protein phosphorylation as a biological regulatory mechanism"	
1992		Edwin G. Krebs (1918–2009)	United States	"for their discoveries concerning reversible protein phosphorylation as a biological regulatory mechanism"	
1993		Richard J. Roberts (b. 1943)	United Kingdom	"for their discoveries of split genes"	
1993		Phillip Sharp (b. 1944)	United States	"for their discoveries of split genes"	
1994		Alfred G. Gilman (1941–2015)	United States	"for their discovery of G-proteins and the role of these proteins in signal transduction in cells"	
1994		Martin Rodbell (1925–1998)	United States	"for their discovery of G-proteins and the role of these proteins in signal transduction in cells"	
1995		Edward B. Lewis (1918–2004)	United States	"for their discoveries concerning the genetic control of early embryonic development"	
1995		Christiane Nüsslein-Volhard (b. 1942)	Germany	"for their discoveries concerning the genetic control of early embryonic development"	
1995		Eric F. Wieschaus (b. 1947)	United States	"for their discoveries concerning the genetic control of early embryonic development"	
1996		Peter C. Doherty (b. 1940)	Australia	"for their discoveries concerning the specificity of the cell mediated immune defence"	
1996		Rolf M. Zinkernagel (b. 1944)	Switzerland	"for their discoveries concerning the specificity of the cell mediated immune defence"	
1997		Stanley B. Prusiner (b. 1942)	United States	"for his discovery of Prions - a new biological principle of infection"	
1998		Robert F. Furchgott (1916–2009)	United States	"for their discoveries concerning nitric oxide as a signalling molecule in the cardiovascular system"	
1998		Louis Ignarro (b. 1941)	United States	"for their discoveries concerning nitric oxide as a signalling molecule in the cardiovascular system"	
1998		Ferid Murad (1936–2023)	United States	"for their discoveries concerning nitric oxide as a signalling molecule in the cardiovascular system"	
1999		Günter Blobel (1936–2018)	United States	"for the discovery that proteins have intrinsic signals that govern their transport and localization in the cell"	
2000		Arvid Carlsson (1923–2018)	Sweden	"for their discoveries concerning signal transduction in the nervous system"	
2000		Paul Greengard (1925–2019)	United States	"for their discoveries concerning signal transduction in the nervous system"	
2000		Eric Kandel (b. 1929)	Austria; United States	"for their discoveries concerning signal transduction in the nervous system"	
2001		Leland H. Hartwell (b. 1939)	United States	"for their discoveries of key regulators of the cell cycle"	
2001		Tim Hunt (b. 1943)	United Kingdom	"for their discoveries of key regulators of the cell cycle"	
2001		Paul Nurse (b. 1949)	United Kingdom	"for their discoveries of key regulators of the cell cycle"	
2002		Sydney Brenner (1927–2019)	South Africa	"for their discoveries concerning 'genetic regulation of organ development and programmed cell death'"	
2002		H. Robert Horvitz (b. 1947)	United States	"for their discoveries concerning 'genetic regulation of organ development and programmed cell death'"	
2002		John Sulston (1942–2018)	United Kingdom	"for their discoveries concerning 'genetic regulation of organ development and programmed cell death'"	
2003		Paul Lauterbur (1929–2007)	United States	"for their discoveries concerning magnetic resonance imaging"	
2003		Peter Mansfield (1933–2017)	United Kingdom	"for their discoveries concerning magnetic resonance imaging"	
2004		Richard Axel (b. 1946)	United States	"for their discoveries of odorant receptors and the organization of the olfactory system"	
2004		Linda B. Buck (b. 1947)	United States	"for their discoveries of odorant receptors and the organization of the olfactory system"	
2005		Barry Marshall (b. 1951)	Australia	"for their discovery of the bacterium Helicobacter pylori and its role in gastritis and peptic ulcer disease"	
2005		J. Robin Warren (1937–2024)	Australia	"for their discovery of the bacterium Helicobacter pylori and its role in gastritis and peptic ulcer disease"	
2006		Andrew Fire (b. 1959)	United States	"for their discovery of RNA interference - gene silencing by double-stranded RNA"	
2006		Craig Mello (b. 1960)	United States	"for their discovery of RNA interference - gene silencing by double-stranded RNA"	
2007		Mario Capecchi (b. 1937)	Italy; United States	"for their discoveries of principles for introducing specific gene modifications in mice by the use of embryonic stem cells."	
2007		Martin Evans (b. 1941)	United Kingdom	"for their discoveries of principles for introducing specific gene modifications in mice by the use of embryonic stem cells."	
2007		Oliver Smithies (1925–2017)	United Kingdom; United States	"for their discoveries of principles for introducing specific gene modifications in mice by the use of embryonic stem cells."	
2008		Harald zur Hausen (1936–2023)	Germany	"for his discovery of human papilloma viruses causing cervical cancer"	
2008		Françoise Barré-Sinoussi (b. 1947)	France	"for their discovery of human immunodeficiency virus"	
2008		Luc Montagnier (1932–2022)	France	"for their discovery of human immunodeficiency virus"	
2009		Elizabeth Blackburn (b. 1948)	Australia; United States	"for the discovery of how chromosomes are protected by telomeres and the enzyme telomerase"	
2009		Carol W. Greider (b. 1961)	United States	"for the discovery of how chromosomes are protected by telomeres and the enzyme telomerase"	
2009		Jack W. Szostak (b. 1952)	Canada; United States	"for the discovery of how chromosomes are protected by telomeres and the enzyme telomerase"	
2010		Robert G. Edwards (1925–2013)	United Kingdom	"for the development of in vitro fertilization"	
2011		Ralph M. Steinman (1943–2011)	Canada	"for his discovery of the dendritic cell and its role in adaptive immunity" (awarded posthumously)	
2011		Bruce Beutler (b. 1957)	United States	"for their discoveries concerning the activation of innate immunity"	
2011		Jules A. Hoffmann (b. 1941)	France	"for their discoveries concerning the activation of innate immunity"	
2012		John Gurdon (1933–2025)	United Kingdom	"for the discovery that mature cells can be reprogrammed to become pluripotent"	
2012	Shinya Yamanaka	Shinya Yamanaka (b. 1962)	Japan	"for the discovery that mature cells can be reprogrammed to become pluripotent"	
2013		James E. Rothman (b. 1950)	United States	"for their discoveries of machinery regulating vesicle traffic, a major transport system in our cells"	
2013		Randy W. Schekman (b. 1948)	United States	"for their discoveries of machinery regulating vesicle traffic, a major transport system in our cells"	
2013		Thomas C. Südhof (b. 1955)	Germany; United States	"for their discoveries of machinery regulating vesicle traffic, a major transport system in our cells"	
2014		Edvard I. Moser (b. 1962)	Norway	"for their discoveries of cells that constitute a positioning system in the brain"	
2014		May-Britt Moser (b. 1963)	Norway	"for their discoveries of cells that constitute a positioning system in the brain"	
2014		John O'Keefe (b. 1939)	United Kingdom; United States	"for their discoveries of cells that constitute a positioning system in the brain"	
2015		William C. Campbell (b. 1930)	Ireland; United States	"for their discoveries concerning a novel therapy against infections caused by roundworm parasites"	
2015		Satoshi Ōmura (b. 1935)	Japan	"for their discoveries concerning a novel therapy against infections caused by roundworm parasites"	
2015		Tu Youyou (b. 1930)	China	"for her discoveries concerning a novel therapy against malaria"	
2016		Yoshinori Ohsumi (b. 1945)	Japan	"for his discoveries of mechanisms for autophagy"	
2017		Jeffrey C. Hall (b. 1945)	United States	"for their discoveries of molecular mechanisms controlling the circadian rhythm"	
2017		Michael Rosbash (b. 1944)	United States	"for their discoveries of molecular mechanisms controlling the circadian rhythm"	
2017		Michael W. Young (b. 1949)	United States	"for their discoveries of molecular mechanisms controlling the circadian rhythm"	
2018		James P. Allison (b. 1948)	United States	"for their discovery of cancer therapy by inhibition of negative immune regulation"	
2018		Tasuku Honjo (b. 1942)	Japan	"for their discovery of cancer therapy by inhibition of negative immune regulation"	
2019		William Kaelin Jr. (b. 1957)	United States	"for their discoveries of how cells sense and adapt to oxygen availability"	
2019		Peter J. Ratcliffe (b. 1954)	United Kingdom	"for their discoveries of how cells sense and adapt to oxygen availability"	
2019		Gregg L. Semenza (b. 1956)	United States	"for their discoveries of how cells sense and adapt to oxygen availability"	
2020		Harvey J. Alter (b. 1935)	United States	"for the discovery of Hepatitis C virus"	
2020		Michael Houghton (b. 1949)	United Kingdom	"for the discovery of Hepatitis C virus"	
2020		Charles M. Rice (b. 1952)	United States	"for the discovery of Hepatitis C virus"	
2021		David Julius (b. 1955)	United States	"for the discovery of receptors for temperature and touch"	
2021		Ardem Patapoutian (b. 1967)	Lebanon; United States	"for the discovery of receptors for temperature and touch"	
2022		Svante Pääbo (b. 1955)	Sweden	"for his discoveries concerning the genomes of extinct hominins and human evolution"	
2023		Katalin Karikó (b. 1955)	Hungary; United States	"for their discoveries concerning nucleoside base modifications that enabled the development of effective mRNA vaccines against COVID-19"	
2023		Drew Weissman (b. 1959)	United States	"for their discoveries concerning nucleoside base modifications that enabled the development of effective mRNA vaccines against COVID-19"	
2024		Victor Ambros (b. 1953)	Poland; United States	"for the discovery of microRNA and its role in post-transcriptional gene regulation"	
2024		Gary Ruvkun (b. 1952)	United States	"for the discovery of microRNA and its role in post-transcriptional gene regulation"	
2025		Mary E. Brunkow (b. 1961)	United States	"for their discoveries concerning peripheral immune tolerance"	
2025		Fred Ramsdell (b. 1960)	United States	"for their discoveries concerning peripheral immune tolerance"	
2025		Shimon Sakaguchi (b. 1951)	Japan	"for their discoveries concerning peripheral immune tolerance"	
2026		Karl Deisseroth (b. 1971)	United States	"for their discoveries concerning light-gated ion channels and optogenetics"	
2026		Peter Hegemann (b. 1954)	Germany	"for their discoveries concerning light-gated ion channels and optogenetics"	
2026		Georg Nagel (b. 1953)	Germany	"for their discoveries concerning light-gated ion channels and optogenetics"	
