= Gero Miesenböck =

Austrian neuroscientist (born 1965)

Gero Miesenböck FRS
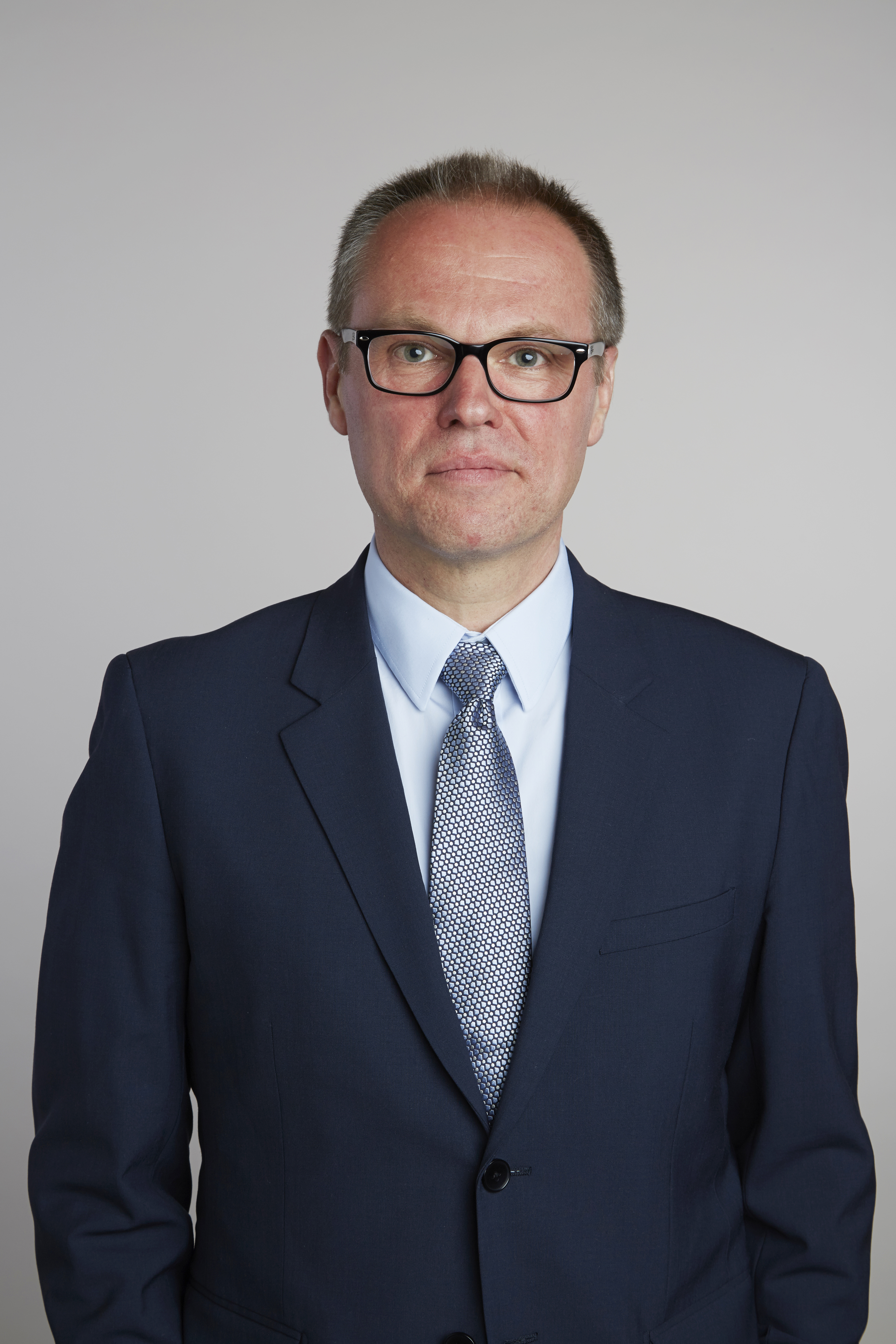
- Miesenböck in 2015
- Born: Gero Andreas Miesenböck; 15 July 1965 (age 61); Austria
- Education: University of Innsbruck; Umeå University
- Known for: Optogenetics; Sleep-wake regulation
- Awards: InBev-Baillet Latour Prize (2012); The Brain Prize (2013); Gabbay Award (2013); Heinrich Wieland Prize (2015); BBVA Award (2015); Massry Prize (2016); Rumford Prize (2019); Warren Alpert Foundation Prize (2019); Shaw Prize (2020); Louisa Gross Horwitz Prize (2022); Japan Prize (2023)
- Scientific career
- Fields: Neuroscience
- Workplaces: University of Oxford; Yale University; Memorial Sloan-Kettering Cancer Center
- Website: www.cncb.ox.ac.uk/people/gero-miesenboeck/

Gero Andreas Miesenböck (born 15 July 1965) is an Austrian scientist. He is currently Waynflete Professor of Physiology and Director of the Centre for Neural Circuits and Behaviour (CNCB) at the University of Oxford and a fellow of Magdalen College, Oxford.

== Education and early life ==
A native of Austria, Miesenböck was educated at the University of Innsbruck and Umeå University in Sweden. He graduated sub auspiciis praesidentis rei publicae from the University of Innsbruck Medical School. Following his Doctor of Medicine (MD) in 1993, he undertook postdoctoral training with James Rothman.

== Research and career ==
=== Optogenetics ===
Miesenböck is known as the founder of optogenetics. He was the first scientist to modify nerve cells genetically so that their electrical activity could be controlled with light. This involved inserting DNA for light-responsive opsin proteins into the cells. Miesenböck used similar genetic modifications to breed animals whose brains contained light-responsive nerve cells integrated into their circuitry, and was the first to demonstrate that the behavior of these animals could be remote-controlled.

The principle of optogenetic control established by Miesenböck has been widely adopted, generalized to other biological systems, and technically improved.

=== Sleep and mitochondria ===
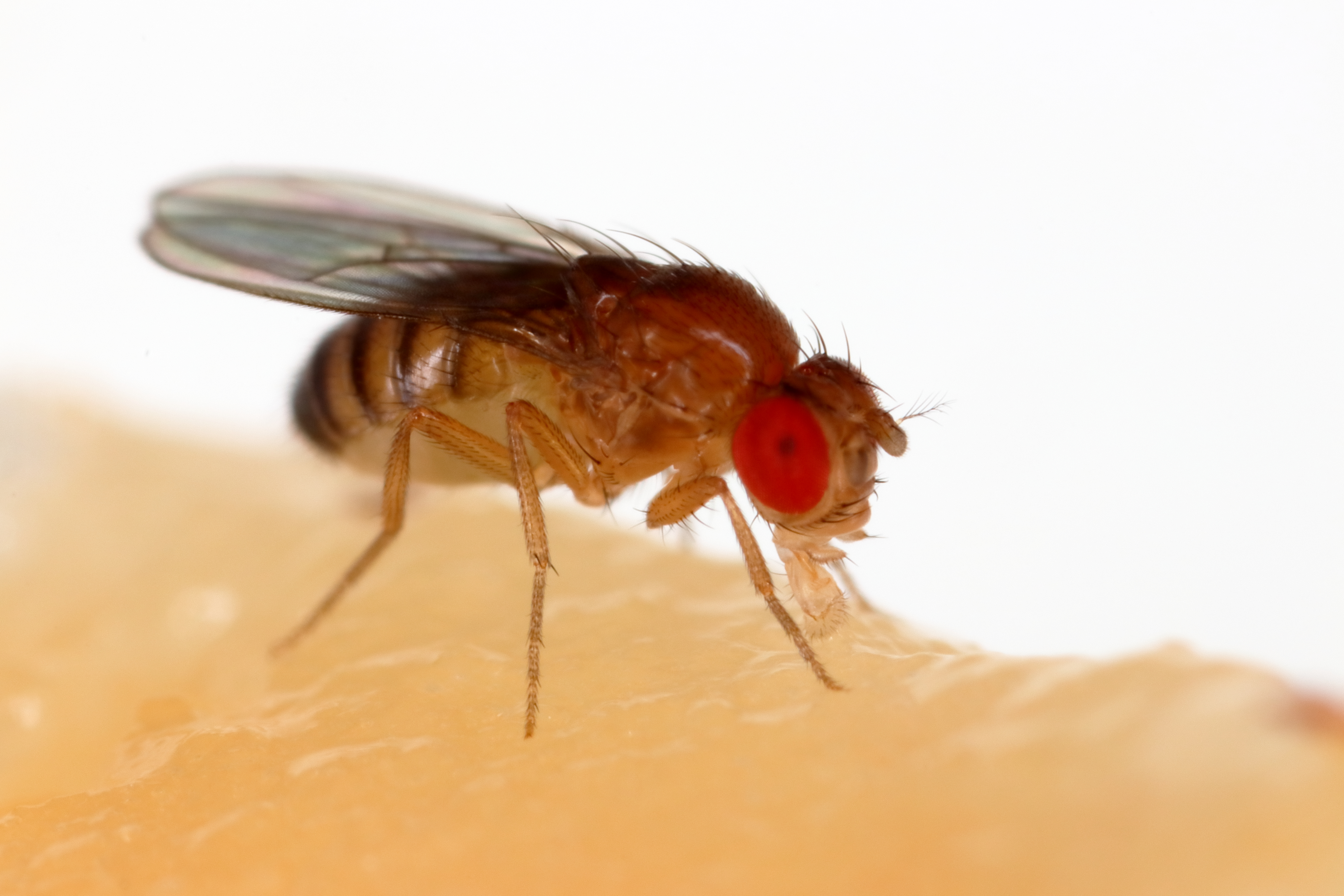
Drosophila Melanogaster, the object of Miesenböck's science in studying metabolism and sleep

Miesenböck's studies in Drosophila melanogaster (fruit flies) point to aerobic metabolism as a root cause of sleep. He discovered that sleep-inducing neurons estimate sleep need by monitoring the flow of electrons through their mitochondria. Sleep loss creates an imbalance between electron supply and ATP demand that diverts electrons from the respiratory chain into side reactions with molecular oxygen, producing reactive oxygen species which fragment the polyunsaturated fatty acyl chains of membrane lipids. Sleep-control neurons use a redox-active potassium channel subunit to count the release of lipid peroxidation products and transduce this signal into sleep. Miesenböck's work has thus furnished a molecular interpretation of sleep pressure, uncovered the cellular processes responsible for its accumulation and discharge, and identified aerobic metabolism as a fundamental cause of sleep.

Before being appointed to the Waynflete Professorship in 2007, Miesenböck held faculty positions at Memorial Sloan-Kettering Cancer Center and Yale University. In 2011 he became founding director of the Center for Neural Circuits and Behavior.

=== Awards and honors ===
In 2012 Miesenböck was awarded the InBev-Baillet Latour International Health Prize for "pioneering optogenetic approaches to manipulate neuronal activity and to control animal behaviour". In 2013 he shared the Brain Prize with Ernst Bamberg, Edward Boyden, Karl Deisseroth, Peter Hegemann and Georg Nagel, and the Jacob Heskel Gabbay Award in Biotechnology and Medicine with Edward Boyden and Karl Deisseroth. He was elected a Fellow of the Royal Society (FRS) in 2015.

His certificate of election reads:

Gero Miesenboeck pioneered the science of optogenetics. He established the principles of optogenetic control in 2002, using rhodopsin to activate normally light-insensitive neurons. He was the first to use optogenetics to control behaviour. These seminal experiments have provided a platform for an explosion in optogenetic applications. Recent honours testify to the significance of these findings. Miesenboeck has exploited optogenetics in a succession of brilliant experiments illuminating synaptic connectivity, the neural basis of reward, mechanisms of sleep homeostasis and the control of sexually dimorphic circuitry. These incisive contributions to neuroscience have demonstrated the full potential of optogenetics beyond the proof-of-principle stage.

In 2015 he received the Heinrich Wieland Prize "for his breakthrough concept of optogenetics and its proof of principle" and in 2016 the Wilhelm Exner Medal.

Miesenböck was elected a member of the European Molecular Biology Organization (EMBO) in 2008, and a member of the Academy of Medical Sciences, United Kingdom in 2012, the Austrian Academy of Sciences in 2014, the German Academy of Sciences Leopoldina in 2016, the Academia Europaea in 2017, and an international member of the US National Academy of Sciences in 2025.

In 2017, Trinity College Dublin awarded him an honorary doctorate.

In 2019, Miesenböck received the Rumford Prize for "extraordinary contributions related to the invention and refinement of optogenetics," with Ernst Bamberg, Ed Boyden, Karl Deisseroth, Peter Hegemann, and Georg Nagel. In the same year, he, Boyden, Deisseroth, and Hegemann won the Warren Alpert Foundation Prize. In 2020 he was awarded the Shaw Prize in Life Sciences, and in 2022 the Louisa Gross Horwitz Prize. In 2023 he received the Japan Prize.
