= Georg Nagel =

German biophysicist (born 1953)

- Georg Nagel in 2013
- Born: 24 August 1953 (age 73); Weingarten, Baden-Württemberg, West Germany (now Germany)
- Education: University of Konstanz; University of Frankfurt (PhD)
- Known for: Optogenetics; Discovery of Channelrhodopsin
- Awards: Wiley Prize (2010); Louis-Jeantet Prize for Medicine (2013); The Brain Prize (2013); EMBO Member (2015); Rumford Prize (2019); Shaw Prize (2020); Nobel Prize in Physiology or Medicine (2026)
- Scientific career
- Fields: Optogenetics; Molecular plant physiology; Biophysics
- Workplaces: University of Würzburg; Max Planck Institute for Biophysics
- Thesis: Ionentransport über Zellmembranen: elektrische Untersuchung von Membranproteinen in situ und rekonstituiert an künstlichen Lipidmembranen (1988)
- Doctoral advisor: Ernst Bamberg

Georg Nagel (born 24 August 1953) is a German biophysicist and professor at the Department for Neurophysiology at the University of Würzburg in Germany. His research is focused on microbial photoreceptors and the development of optogenetic tools. In 2026, he was jointly awarded the Nobel Prize in Physiology or Medicine with Karl Deisseroth and Peter Hegemann "for their discoveries concerning light-gated ion channels and optogenetics."

== Early life and education ==
Georg Nagel studied biology and biophysics at the University of Konstanz, Germany. He received his PhD from the University of Frankfurt in 1988, working at the Max Planck Institute of Biophysics in Frankfurt. As a postdoc, he worked at Yale University and Rockefeller University, US.

== Career ==
From 1992 to 2004, Nagel headed an independent research group in the Department of Biophysical Chemistry at the Max Planck Institute of Biophysics in Frankfurt. Since 2004, he is a professor at the University of Würzburg, Germany, first at the Department for Molecular Plant Physiology and Biophysics, since 2019 at the Department for Neurophysiology.

== Research ==
Nobel Prize 2026 for the development of optogenetics

Georg Nagel, together with Peter Hegemann, is credited with the discovery of channelrhodopsins, which opened the new field of optogenetics. Early in 1995, Georg Nagel and Ernst Bamberg demonstrated that a microbial rhodopsin (Bacteriorhodopsin), when expressed in animal cells (Xenopus oocytes), is fully functional and makes the cells light-sensitive. In 2003, Nagel showed the functionality of channelrhodopsin-2 (ChR2) in a mammalian cell line, where illumination with blue light caused a strong depolarization of the membrane potential. Following this proof-of-principle publication, ChR2 was expressed in hippocampal neurons in collaboration with Karl Deisseroth, where light pulses caused action potentials with high temporal precision. The first application of optogenetics in an intact animal, the round worm Caenorhabditis elegans, published 2005 by Georg Nagel and Alexander Gottschalk, was based on a ChR2 mutant (H134R) Nagel had created to improve photocurrents. The first successful optogenetic inhibition of neuronal spiking (2007) was based on Nagel's earlier experiments with halorhodopsin from Natronomonas pharaonis. In 2007, in another collaboration with Peter Hegemann, Georg Nagel started the optogenetic manipulation of cAMP. In 2015, Georg Nagel and Shiqiang Gao, together with Alexander Gottschalk's group, characterized the first 8 TM enzyme rhodopsin, Cyclop, which raises the concentration of cGMP when activated with light. Through the development of genetically encoded tools, Georg Nagel's group has pushed the boundaries of optical control from ion channels and pumps to second messenger systems, and has applied them to many different types of organisms, including plants.

== Honours and awards ==
- 2010 Wiley Prize in Biomedical Sciences, together with Peter Hegemann and Ernst Bamberg
- 2010 Karl Heinz Beckurts Prize, together with Peter Hegemann und Ernst Bamberg
- 2012 Zülch Prize
- 2013 Louis-Jeantet Prize for Medicine, together with Peter Hegemann
- 2013 The Brain Prize, awarded by the Grete Lundbeck European Brain Research Foundation
- 2015 selected as Member of the European Molecular Biology Organization (EMBO)
- 2019 Rumford Prize for "extraordinary contributions related to the invention and refinement of optogenetics," with Ernst Bamberg, Ed Boyden, Karl Deisseroth, Peter Hegemann, and Gero Miesenböck.
- 2020 Shaw Prize in Life Sciences.
- 2026 Nobel Prize in Physiology or Medicine

Nagel's 2026 Nobel award recognised discoveries made at the Max Planck Institute for Biophysics in Frankfurt. The Nobel Assembly highlighted his work with Peter Hegemann in identifying the algal protein channelrhodopsin, which made cells sensitive to blue light. The prize was shared equally with Hegemann and Karl Deisseroth, who developed its use in controlling nerve cells.
