= Ernst Bamberg =

German biophysicist (born 1940)

Ernst Bamberg (born November 9, 1940 in Krefeld) is a German biophysicist and director emeritus of the Department of Biophysical Chemistry at the Max Planck Institute of Biophysics.

== Career ==
Bamberg received his PhD in physical chemistry from the University of Basel in 1971, and a habilitation in biophysical chemistry from the University of Konstanz in 1976. He was a Heisenberg fellow from 1979 to 1983, when he became head of an independent working group at the Max Planck Institute of Biophysics in Frankfurt/Main. In 1988, he became an adjunct professor at Frankfurt University, which named him a full professor of biophysical chemistry in 1993, and professor emeritus in 2009. He has also been a director and Scientific Member at the Max Planck Institute of Biophysics since 1993, and a senior investigator at the Cluster of Excellence Frankfurt (CEF) since 2008.

== Research ==
Bamberg's research focuses on channelrhodopsins. With Georg Nagel and Peter Hegemann, who were attempting to identify the proteins that allow Chlamydomonas reinhardtii, a green alga, to move toward light using photocurrents, Bamberg was part of the first research team to isolate and characterize channelrhodopsin 2 (ChR2). "We had a hard time trying to convince people that it was true," he told Nature later, but "Before we published the first papers [showing that algal proteins could generate currents in eukaryotic cells], we applied for a patent where we gave to our fantasy a free run about the possible applications of channelrhodopsins on electrically excitable cells, including some biomedical applications." In 2005, Bamberg and Nagel worked with Ed Boyden, Karl Deisseroth, and Feng Zhang to demonstrate that this light-gated channel could be used as an actuator to control neural activity, helping to lay the foundations for the study of optogenetics.

== Selected awards ==
- 1987 Boris Rajewsky Preis für Biophysik
- 2009 Stifterverbandspreis des Stifterverbands für die Deutsche Wissenschaft
- 2010 Wiley Prize in Biomedical Sciences, with Peter Hegemann and Georg Nagel
- 2010 Karl Heinz Beckurts Prize for Technological Innovation
- 2011 Member of the Leopoldina National Academy of Sciences
- 2012 K. J. Zülch-Preis der Gertrud Reemtsma Stiftung, für neurologische Grundlagenforschung (basic neuroscience), with Peter Hegemann, Georg Nagel, and Karl Deisseroth
- 2013 The Brain Prize from the Grete Lundbeck European Brain Research Foundation, with Ed Boyden, Karl Deisseroth, Peter Hegemann, Gero Miesenböck, and Georg Nagel
- 2019 Citation Laureate from the Web of Science Group
- 2019 Rumford Prize from the American Academy of Arts and Sciences, with Ed Boyden, Karl Deisseroth, Peter Hegemann, Gero Miesenböck, and Georg Nagel
