= Alexander Gottschalk =

German cellular and molecular neurobiologist

Alexander Gottschalk is Professor of Cellular and Molecular Neurobiology at the Goethe University in Frankfurt, Germany.

== Scientific career ==
Alexander Gottschalk studied chemistry, biochemistry and immunology at Goethe University in Frankfurt, Philipps University in Marburg and University of Edinburgh, UK. His PhD thesis (Dr. rer. nat.) was conducted in the laboratory of Reinhard Lührmann at the University of Marburg. As a postdoctoral fellow, he worked with William R. Schafer at UC San Diego to study the nervous system of Caenorhabditis elegans. In 2004, he became an independent research group leader in Frankfurt. In 2010, he was awarded a Heisenberg-Professor position and became Full Professor for Molecular Cell Biology and Neurobiochemistry in 2016. His research group is located at the Buchmann Institute for Molecular Life Sciences.

== Research ==
Alexander Gottschalk studies the neuronal control of behavior in the nematode Caenorhabditis elegans. In 2005, he demonstrated that neuronal expression of the light-gated channel Channelrhodpsin-2 allows controlling the movement of an intact animal with blue light, making him one of the pioneers of Optogenetics. Working with Nobel price laureate Georg Nagel, he developed optogenetic tools to modulate the second messenger cGMP. He is the coordinator of Priority Programme SPP1926, 'Next Generation Optogenetics' of the German Research Foundation.

== Prizes and awards ==
- 2005 Career Development Award of the Human Frontier Science Program
- 2008 Schram Award
