= Hartmut Michel =

German biochemist (born 1948)

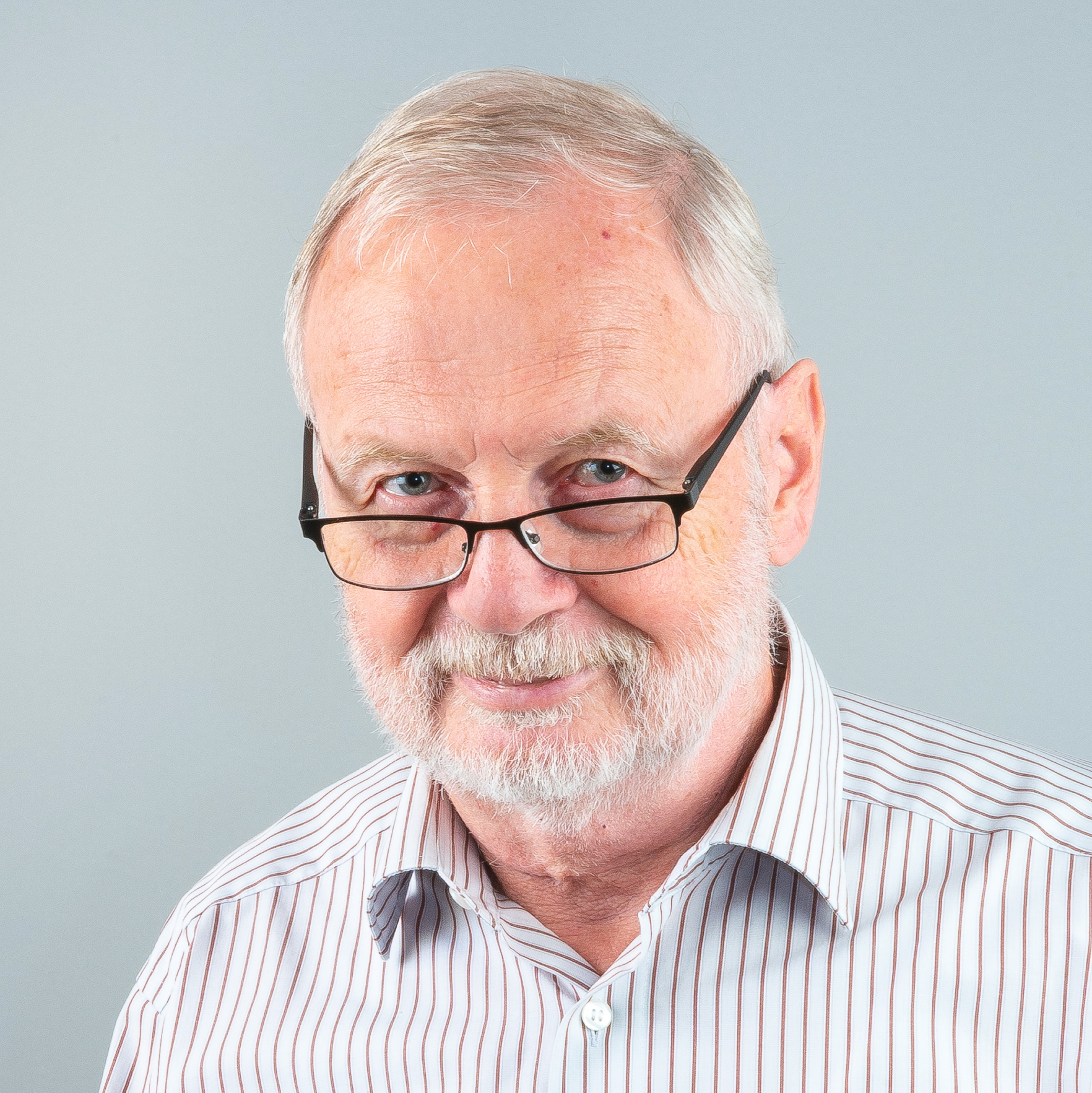
- Hartmut Michel in 2022
- Born: 18 July 1948 (age 78); Ludwigsburg, Württemberg-Baden, American Zone, Allied-occupied Germany (now in Baden-Württemberg, Germany)
- Education: University of Tübingen
- Known for: Crystallisation of membrane proteins
- Spouse: Elena Olkhova
- Awards: Max Delbruck Prize (1986); Gottfried Wilhelm Leibniz Prize (1986); Nobel Prize in Chemistry (1988)
- Scientific career
- Fields: Biochemistry
- Workplaces: Max Planck Institute for Biophysics, Jilin University
- Website: www.biophys.mpg.de/en/michel.html

Hartmut Michel (German pronunciation: [ˈhaʁtmuːt ˈmɪçl̩]; born 18 July 1948) is a German biochemist, who received the 1988 Nobel Prize in Chemistry for determination of the first crystal structure of an integral membrane protein, a membrane-bound complex of proteins and co-factors that is essential to photosynthesis.

He is currently a professor at Jilin University, China.

== Early life and education ==
He was born on 18 July 1948 in Ludwigsburg. After compulsory military service, he studied biochemistry at the University of Tübingen, working for his final year at Dieter Oesterhelt's laboratory on ATPase activity of halobacteria.

== Career and research ==
Michel later worked on the crystallisation of membrane proteins – essential for their structure elucidation by X-ray crystallography. He received the Nobel Prize jointly with Johann Deisenhofer and Robert Huber in 1988. Together with Michel and Huber, Deisenhofer determined the three-dimensional structure of a protein complex found in certain photosynthetic bacteria. This membrane protein complex, called a photosynthetic reaction center, was known to play a crucial role in initiating a simple type of photosynthesis. Between 1982 and 1985, the three scientists used X-ray crystallography to determine the exact arrangement of the more than 10,000 atoms that make up the protein complex. Their research increased the general understanding of the mechanisms of photosynthesis, revealed similarities between the photosynthetic processes of plants and bacteria and established a methodology for crystallising membrane proteins.

Since 1987 he has been director of the Molecular Membrane Biology department at the Max Planck Institute for Biophysics in Frankfurt am Main, Germany, and professor of biochemistry at the Goethe University Frankfurt.

In 2026, Michel accepted a position as full-time professor at Jilin University in Changchun, China. His work is expected to include translational medicine, drug development and structural biology.

== Awards and honours ==
In 1986, he received the Gottfried Wilhelm Leibniz Prize of the Deutsche Forschungsgemeinschaft, which is the highest honour awarded in German research. In 1988, he received the Nobel Prize in Chemistry. He received the Bijvoet Medal at the Bijvoet Center for Biomolecular Research of Utrecht University in 1989. In 1995 he became a member of the German Academy of Sciences Leopoldina. He also became a foreign member of the Royal Netherlands Academy of Arts and Sciences in 1995. He was elected a Foreign Member of the Royal Society (ForMemRS) in 2005.
