= Edward Boyden =

American neuroscientist (born 1979)

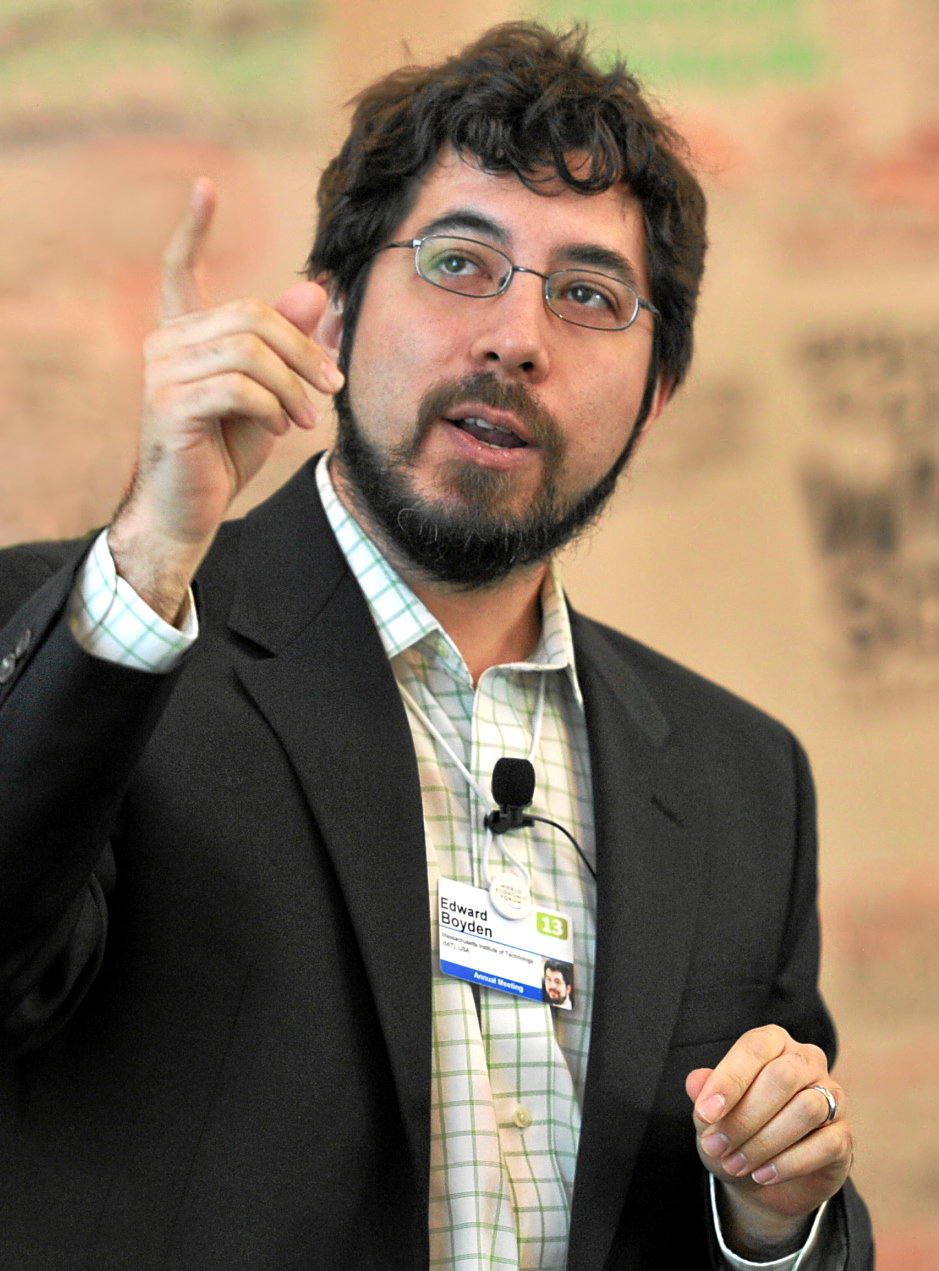
- Boyden in 2013
- Born: August 18, 1979 (age 47); Plano, Texas
- Education: Stanford University; MIT
- Awards: Perl-UNC Prize (2011); IET A F Harvey Prize (2011); The Brain Prize (2013); Breakthrough Prize in Life Sciences (2016); Gairdner Foundation International Award (2018); Rumford Prize (2019); National Academy of Sciences (2019); Warren Alpert Foundation Prize (2019); Wilhelm Exner Medal (2020)
- Scientific career
- Workplaces: MIT; Bell Labs
- Thesis: Task-specific neural mechanisms of memory encoding (2005)
- Doctoral advisor: Jennifer Raymond; Richard Tsien
- Other academic advisors: Neil Gershenfeld
- Notable students: Deblina Sarkar; Christian Wentz; Kate Adamala

Edward S. Boyden (born August 18, 1979) is an American neuroscientist and entrepreneur at MIT. He is the Y. Eva Tan Professor in Neurotechnology, and a full member of the McGovern Institute for Brain Research. He is recognized for his work on optogenetics and expansion microscopy. Boyden joined the MIT faculty in 2007, and continues to develop new optogenetic tools as well as other technologies for the manipulation and analysis of brain structure and activity. He received the 2015 Breakthrough Prize in Life Sciences.

== Early life and education ==
Boyden was born in Plano, Texas. His mother, Nit Boyden, has a masters degree in biochemistry and conducted research on nicotine, later staying home to tend to Boyden and his sister. His father, Ed Boyden Jr., worked in management consulting. In childhood, Boyden wanted to understand humanity, at first preferring math over science. He eventually pivoted to being interested in how our minds are capable of understanding math. As a young teenager, his thoughts resulted in what he now calls the "loop of understanding": "Math is how we understand things at a deep level, our minds do math, the brain gives rise to our minds, biology governs our brains, chemistry implements biology, the principles of physics rule over chemistry, and physics run on math. It’s a loop from math to math, with all the knowledge in between."

Boyden won a statewide science fair in Texas at age 12 with a project in geometry. At 14, Boyden began attending the Texas Academy of Mathematics and Science at the University of North Texas where he studied chemistry and mathematics alongside his high school coursework. There, he worked in Paul Braterman's lab examining the origins of life chemistry.

Boyden began his studies at MIT in 1995 at the age of 16, skipping two grades. In 1999 he completed an SB degree in physics and in electrical engineering and computer science as well as an MEng degree in electrical engineering and computer science, writing his thesis on quantum computing under the supervision of Neil Gershenfeld, a professor in the MIT Media Lab.

In 1999, Boyden began a PhD in neuroscience at Stanford University advised by Jennifer Raymond and Richard W. Tsien. He completed it in 2005.

== Career ==
Following his PhD, Boyden worked as a Helen Hay Whitney postdoctoral fellow in the departments of bioengineering, applied physics, and biology at Stanford University for a year. There, he worked with Mark Schnitzer and Karl Deisseroth to invent optical methods in neuroscience research. In 2006, he moved to MIT to work as a visiting scientist in the MIT Media Lab, leading the Neuroengineering and Neuromedia Group.

In 2007, Boyden established the Synthetic Neurobiology Group at MIT and also began working as an assistant professor in the MIT Media Lab and MIT Department of Biological Engineering. The next year, he became an assistant professor in the MIT Department of Brain and Cognitive Sciences.

Boyden became an investigator at the MIT McGovern Institute in 2010. In 2013, he established the MIT Center for Neurobiological Engineering, which he now co-directs alongside Alan Jasanoff. In 2015, he became a founding faculty member of the Aging Brain Initiative at the MIT Picower Institute, with director Li-Huei Tsai, Emery N. Brown, and others.

He became an extramural member of the MIT Koch Institute for Integrative Cancer Research in 2017 before he was appointed the Y. Eva Tan Professor in Neurotechnology at MIT a year later. 7 years after arriving at MIT, Boyden was awarded tenure as a full time professor.

In 2020, Boyden became an investigator at the Howard Hughes Medical Institute. The following year, he began co-directing the K. Lisa Yang Center for Bionics at MIT.

== Research ==
Boyden's research encompasses optogenetics, expansion microscopy, deep brain stimulation, multiplexed imaging, machine learning, and more. He has authored or co-authored over 275 scientific papers, with a h-index of 124.

=== Optogenetics ===
In optogenetics, a light-sensitive ion channel or pump such as channelrhodopsin-2 is genetically expressed in neurons, allowing neuronal activity to be controlled by light. There were early efforts to achieve targeted optical control dating back to 2002 that did not involve a directly light-activated ion channel, but it was the method based on directly light-activated channels from microbes, such as channelrhodopsin, emerging in 2005 that turned out to be broadly useful. Optogenetics in this way has been widely adopted by neuroscientists as a research tool, and it is also thought to have potential therapeutic applications.

Boyden reported in 2007 that targeting the codon-optimized light-driven halorhodopsin chloride pump (Halo) from Natronomas pharaonis allowed for optogenetic silencing with yellow light. Later in 2010, he reported that archaerhodopsin-3 (Arch) from Halorubrum sodomense facilitated near-complete silencing of neurons using yellow light. Arch is also capable of spontaneously recovering from inactivation unlike Halo, which goes into lengthy inactive states. Its high performance enabled many new neuroscientific investigations using brain engineering.

In 2014, Boyden reported how the channelrhodopsin Chronos could respond extremely fast to light, and how the channelrhodopsin Chrimson responded to red light. Chronos's kinetics is quicker than previous channelrhodopsins but is more sensitive to light. This discovery enabled two-color activation of neurons without significant cross-talk. This led to the first optogenetics in people in 2021, where a blind patient was injected with an adeno-associated viral vector encoding ChrimsonR coupled with goggle-enabled light stimulation. The patient successfully perceived, located, counted, and touched objects using the vector-treated eye with the goggles. This case reports the greatest partial functional recovery to date, for such forms of blindness.

The cruxhalorhodopsin (Jaws) from Haloarcula salinarum was engineered to induce inhibition in response to red light in 2014. In 2017, Boyden designed a high-efficacy soma-targeted opsin through combining the N-terminal 150 residues of kainate receptor subunit 2 (KA2) to the high-photocurrent channelrhodopsin CoChR. This restricts its expression to neural somas, responding to holographic stimulation with temporal precision.

=== Expansion microscopy ===
Expansion microscopy (ExM) was developed as an alternative to the light microscope, which is limited in resolution. In 2015, Boyden was able to expand a specimen by synthesizing a swellable polymer network within it. By attaching specific label on the network, its swelling allows for the isotropic separation and optical resolution. This allows for superresolution microscopy using diffraction-limited microscopes. ExM has been optimized for proteins, nucleic acids, clinical tissues, decrowding, in situ sequencing, and has developed a larger expansion factor. In 2018, Boyden developed a method of shrinking 3D printed materials to achieve nanoscale feature sizes. By using hydrogel scaffolds, Implosion Fabrication (ImpFab) creates conductive 3D silver nanostructures with complex geometries and resolutions in the tens of nanometers.

=== Deep brain stimulation ===
In 2017, Boyden reported a noninvasive method of deep electrical stimulation of neurons. By delivering electric fields at frequencies higher than that able to recruit neural firing but within its dynamic range, neurons within a region enveloped by the electric field can be modulated. This temporal interference (TI) successfully altered motor patterns in living mice. TI was validated in humans in 2023 where it modulated hippocampal activity and increased the accuracy of episodic memories in healthy subjects.

=== Multiplexed imaging ===
Multiplexed imaging is the simultaneous measurement of the dynamics of many signals within a signal transduction network. In 2020, Boyden fused a fluorescent reporter to a pair of a self-assembling peptides to create signaling reporter islands (SiRIs), which can be modularly designed. SiRIs can thus be adapted for simultaneous measurement of multiple signals in a network within single cells distant enough to be resolved under a microscope but close enough to spatially sample the biology (spatial multiplexing). Temporally multiplexed imaging (TMI), reported in 2023, uses genetically encoded fluorescent proteins with temporal properties to represent different signals. This is used to examine relationships between kinase activities within single cells in addition to cell-cycle activities. In 2018, Boyden reported a novel method of engineering complex proteins toward multidimensional specification through robotically picking identified cells as expressing proteins simultaneously exhibiting several properties. This enables the screening of hundreds of thousands of proteins in a few hours while evaluating each for multiple performance properties. The robot was applied to develop a fluorescent voltage indicator, Archon. Voltage imaging, using Archon as well as indicators made by other groups, was applied in areas of the mouse brain in 2019 and later across the entire brains of larval zebrafish in 2023.

== Entrepreneurship ==
Boyden has nearly 200 patented inventions, including a steerable surgical stapler, methods and apparatus for neuromodulation, expansion microscopy, and light-activated proton pumps.

Boyden is the co-founder of Elemind, a neurotechnology company that augments sleep, attention, and the human experience. Elemind launched its neurotech headband that employs brainwaves to treat sleep disorders, long-term pain, and tremors on June 4, 2024.

With fellow MIT professor, Li-Huei Tsai, he co-founded MIT spinoff company, Cognito Therapeutics, in 2016, which develops drug-free therapeutic devices designed to improve the lives of patients living with neurodegenerative disease, such as Alzheimer's, employing noninvasive gamma sensory stimulation findings to slow its progression. Its Spectris non-invasive neurostimulation device received FDA Breakthrough Device Designation in 2021.

Boyden co-founded Expansion Technologies, aiming to enable the early disease detection by utilizing their novel super-resolution imaging method that physically expands samples, as well as Synlife, which innovates therapeutic platforms through bottom-up engineering of synthetic cells with a focus on the encapsulation of enzyme pathways.

Boyden is the scientific advisor of E11 Bio, a nonprofit project focused on neurotechnology development with a focus on brain circuit mapping.

He is the head of advisory board at Inner Cosmos whose mission is to heal depression with their Digital Pill, a penny-sized implant rebalancing brain networks with microstimulations.

== See also ==
- List of people named in the Epstein files

== Personal life ==
At Stanford, Boyden met his ex-wife Xue Han, now a neuroscientist at Boston University. They have two children together.

== Honors and awards ==
- Innovators Under 35 (2006)
- IET A F Harvey Prize (2011)
- Perl-UNC Prize (2012), shared with Feng Zhang and Karl Deisseroth
- Jacob Heskel Gabbay Award for Biotechnology and Medicine (2013), shared with Karl Deisseroth and Gero Miesenböck
- Grete Lundbeck European Brain Research Prize (2013)
- BBVA Foundation Frontiers of Knowledge Award in Biomedicine (2015), shared with Karl Deisseroth and Gero Miesenböck
- Breakthrough Prize in Life Sciences (2015), one of five scientists awarded for “transformative advances toward understanding living systems and extending human life.”
- Canada Gairdner Foundation International Award, shared with Karl Deisseroth and Peter Hegemann
- Lennart Nilsson Award (2019)
- Rumford Prize (2019), shared with Ernst Bamberg, Karl Deisseroth, Peter Hegemann, Gero Miesenböck, and Georg Nagel
- Warren Alpert Foundation Prize (2019), shared with Karl Deisseroth, Peter Hegemann, and Gero Miesenböck
- Elected to the National Academy of Sciences (2019)
- Croonian Medal and Lecture (2020)
- Wilhelm Exner Medal (2020)
