= Peter Hegemann =

German biophysicist (born 1954)

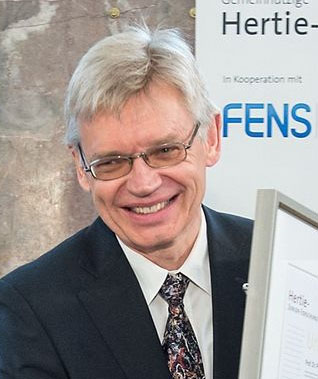
- Hegemann in 2015
- Born: 11 December 1954 (age 71); Münster, North Rhine-Westphalia, West Germany (now Germany)
- Education: University of Münster; LMU Munich; Max Planck Institute of Biochemistry (PhD)
- Known for: Discovery of channelrhodopsin
- Awards: Louisa Gross Horwitz Prize; Albert Lasker Award for Basic Medical Research; Shaw Prize in Life Science and Medicine; Warren Alpert Foundation Prize; Rumford Prize; Canada Gairdner International Award; Otto Warburg Medal; Harvey Prize; Massry Prize; The Brain Prize; Louis-Jeantet Prize for Medicine; Gottfried Wilhelm Leibniz Prize; Wiley Prize in Biomedical Sciences; Nobel Prize in Physiology or Medicine (2026)
- Scientific career
- Fields: Biophysics; Optogenetics
- Workplaces: Humboldt University of Berlin; University of Regensburg; Max Planck Institute of Biochemistry; Syracuse University
- Thesis: Halorhodopsin, die lichtgetriebene Chloridpumpe in Halobacterium halobium: Untersuchungen zur Struktur und Funktion (1984)
- Doctoral advisor: Dieter Oesterhelt
- Website: www.biologie.hu-berlin.de/de/gruppenseiten/expbp/groupmembers/prof.-hegemann-peter

Peter Hegemann (born 11 December 1954) is a German biophysicist, Hertie Senior Research Chair for Neurosciences and a professor of Experimental Biophysics at the Department of Biology, Faculty of Life Sciences, Humboldt University of Berlin, Germany. He is known for his discovery of channelrhodopsin, a type of ion channels regulated by light, thereby serving as a light sensor. This created the field of optogenetics, a technique that controls the activities of specific neurons by applying light. He has received numerous accolades, including the 2026 Nobel Prize in Physiology or Medicine, jointly awarded with Karl Deisseroth and Georg Nagel "for their discoveries concerning light-gated ion channels and optogenetics."

== Early life and education ==
Hegemann was born in Münster in 1954, but grew up in Aachen. Many in his immediate and extended family are doctors, including his parents, brother, and both grandfathers. He was educated in a humanities-oriented gymnasium (humanistisches Gymnasium) for secondary school, which he disliked for his lack of interest in classical studies. He liked science subjects and was at first interested in discovery of new territories and then in outer space. Eventually, he went to the University of Münster in 1975 to study chemistry, transferring to LMU Munich two years later to switch to biochemistry.

After graduating in 1980, Hegemann pursued his PhD at the Max Planck Institute of Biochemistry in the research group of Dieter Oesterhelt, who had just become Director of the institute. He completed it in 1984.

== Career ==
Having won a fellowship for his PhD thesis, Hegemann went to Syracuse University in 1985 as a postdoctoral fellow in Kenneth W. Foster's lab for a year. After returning to Germany, he was offered a five-year position as a principal investigator at the Max Planck Institute of Biochemistry.

In 1993, Hegemann joined the Department of Biochemistry of the University of Regensburg as a professor. He moved to the Humboldt University of Berlin in 2004 and became a professor of Experimental Biophysics. In 2015, he was endowed with a Hertie Senior Research Chair for Neurosciences.

== Research ==
Hegemann's research into light-gated ion transport began in his PhD years, when he investigated the structure and function of halorhodopsin, an active ion transporter found in a type of archaea called haloarchaea that uses light energy to move chloride ions against the gradient. As part of his PhD project, he characterized this protein in Halobacterium salinarum, discovering that yellow light activates halorhodopsin. When halorhodopsin is expressed in neurons and activated by light, the influx of chloride ions shifts the neuron to more negative electric potential, preventing action potential generation and inactivating the neurons.

A 1984 article by Kenneth W. Foster of Syracuse University suggested that rhodopsins would also serve as light detector in the green alga Chlamydomonas reinhardtii. This also prompted Hegemann to spend a year with Foster as a postdoctoral fellow. Hegemann continued characterizing this rhodopsin after returning to Germany. Working on another green alga, he found that it had a fast electrical response (by ion movement through ion channel) to light stimulation, and proposed that the ion channel and the light-detecting rhodopsin were one single protein complex.

Nobel Prize 2026 for the development of optogenetics

In 2002, collaborating with Georg Nagel and Ernst Bamberg, Hegemann made the landmark identification of the gene for this rhodopsin and named it Channelrhodopsin-1. The team identified the second channelrhodopsin gene, Channelrhodopsin-2, the next year. In both studies, they cloned the genes from Chlamydomonas reinhardtii and expressed them in the oocytes of African clawed frog. Upon blue light stimulation, electrical currents were detected in the oocytes. When channelrhodopsins are expressed in neurons and stimulated, the ion channel opens so positively charged calcium and sodium ions can enter the neurons, creating a more positive electric potential inside the neurons and activating them. This is the opposite effect of halorhodopsin activation.

The field of optogenetics took off from these discoveries. In 2005, Hegemann reported expressing channelrhodopsin in chicken embryos, their movement can be controlled with light stimulation. This came in the same year as another study by a collaboration between Karl Deisseroth, Edward Boyden, Feng Zhang, Georg Nagel and Ernst Bamberg, which found light could lead to action potential in cultured neurons expressing channelrhodopsin. Teaming up with Deisseroth, Hegemann continued advancing optogenetics by developing rhodopsin variants that could react faster and more accurately, detect different wavelengths of light and conduct different ions.

Using optogenetic techniques, Hegemann and collaborators have confirmed that the unbalanced activity of excitatory and inhibitory neurons causes behavioral deficits of mental disorders.

== Honours and awards ==
- 2010 – Wiley Prize in Biomedical Sciences
- 2012 – Member of the German Academy of Sciences Leopoldina
- 2013 – Gottfried Wilhelm Leibniz Prize
- 2013 – Louis-Jeantet Prize for Medicine
- 2013 – The Brain Prize
- 2014 – Member of the European Molecular Biology Organization
- 2014 – Member of the Berlin-Brandenburg Academy of Sciences and Humanities
- 2014 – Member of acatech (German National Academy of Science and Engineering)
- 2016 – Harvey Prize
- 2017 – Massry Prize
- 2018 – Otto Warburg Medal
- 2018 – Canada Gairdner International Award
- 2019 – Rumford Prize
- 2019 – Warren Alpert Foundation Prize
- 2020 – Shaw Prize in Life Science and Medicine
- 2021 – Albert Lasker Award for Basic Medical Research
- 2022 – Louisa Gross Horwitz Prize
- 2022 – International Honorary Member of the American Academy of Arts and Sciences
- 2022 – International Member of the National Academy of Sciences
- 2026 – Nobel Prize in Physiology or Medicine

On 5 October 2026, the Nobel Assembly announced that Hegemann would share the medicine prize equally with Karl Deisseroth and Georg Nagel. Its announcement traced the award to Hegemann's investigation of how single-celled algae respond to light and his discovery, with Nagel, of channelrhodopsin. The prize-recognised discoveries were made at the Max Planck Institute for Biochemistry in Martinsried.
