= Karl Deisseroth =

American optogeneticist (born 1971)

- Deisseroth in 2025
- Born: November 18, 1971 (age 54); Boston, Massachusetts, U.S.
- Education: Harvard University (BA); Stanford University (MD–PhD)
- Known for: Optogenetics and hydrogel-tissue chemistry (including CLARITY and STARmap)
- Spouse: Michelle Monje
- Awards: W. Alden Spencer Award (2011); Keio Medical Science Prize (2014); Albany Medical Center Prize (2015); BBVA Foundation Frontiers of Knowledge Award (2015); Breakthrough Prize in Life Sciences (2016); Kyoto Prize (2018); Heineken Prize (2020); Albert Lasker Award for Basic Medical Research (2021); Louisa Gross Horwitz Prize (2022); Japan Prize (2023); Nobel Prize in Physiology or Medicine (2026)
- Scientific career
- Fields: Neuroscience; Psychiatry; Bioengineering
- Workplaces: Stanford University
- Thesis: Communication between Synapse and Nucleus (1998)
- Doctoral advisor: Richard Tsien
- Other academic advisors: Robert Malenka
- Doctoral students: Feng Zhang; Viviana Gradinaru
- Other notable students: Edward Boyden; Kay Tye; Xiao Wang; Priya Rajasethupathy; Ilana B. Witten
- Website: deisseroth.com

Karl Alexander Deisseroth (born November 18, 1971) is an American scientist and physician. He is the D.H. Chen Foundation Professor of Bioengineering and a professor of psychiatry and behavioral sciences at Stanford University. He was jointly awarded the Nobel Prize in Physiology or Medicine in 2026 for his work in optogenetics.

He is known for developing the technologies of hydrogel-tissue chemistry (e.g., CLARITY and STARmap) and optogenetics, and for applying integrated optical and genetic strategies to study normal neural circuit function and dysfunction in neurological and psychiatric illnesses.

In 2019, Deisseroth was elected a member of the United States National Academy of Engineering for his discoveries and control of neuronal signals underlying animal behavior in health and disease, using molecular and optical tools. He is also a member of the United States National Academy of Sciences and the US National Academy of Medicine. In 2026, he was jointly awarded the Nobel Prize in Physiology or Medicine with Georg Nagel and Peter Hegemann "for their discoveries concerning light-gated ion channels and optogenetics".

== Early life and education ==
Karl Deisseroth was born in Boston and later lived in Houston, graduating from St. John's School in 1988. He attended Harvard University and earned a Bachelor of Arts in biochemical sciences in 1992. He moved to Stanford and earned a PhD in neuroscience from Stanford University in 1998, followed by an MD in 2000. He completed his medical internship and psychiatry residency at Stanford University School of Medicine.

== Academic career ==
Deisseroth has led his laboratory at Stanford University since 2004. He serves as an attending physician at Stanford Hospital and Clinics and has been affiliated with the Howard Hughes Medical Institute (HHMI) since 2009. Between 2014 and 2019, he was a foreign adjunct professor at Sweden's Karolinska Institute.

In 2021, he authored a book titled Projections: A Story of Human Emotions, published by Random House, in which he explored the origins of human emotions through personal encounters with neuropsychiatric patients.

== Academic research ==
=== Optogenetics ===
Nobel Prize 2026 for the development of optogenetics

Deisseroth named this field "optogenetics" in 2006 and followed up with the development of optogenetic technologies, leading to many applications, including in psychiatry and neurology. In 2010, the journal Nature Methods named optogenetics "Method of the Year".

For developing optogenetics, Deisseroth received in 2010 the Nakasone Award; in 2013 the Lounsbery Award and the Dickson Prize in Science; in 2014 the Keio Medical Science Prize; and in 2015 the Albany Prize, Lurie Prize, Dickson Prize in Medicine, and Breakthrough Prize in Life Sciences. He also received the 2015 BBVA Foundation Frontiers of Knowledge Award in Biomedicine, jointly with Edward Boyden and Gero Miesenböck. In 2016, Deisseroth received the Massry Prize along with Peter Hegemann and Miesenböck for "optogenetics, a technology that utilizes light to control cells in living tissues". In 2016, Deisseroth and Hegemann received the Harvey Prize from Technion in Israel "for their discovery of opsin molecules, involved in sensing light in microorganisms, and their pioneering work in using these opsins to develop optogenetics". Deisseroth was then awarded Japan's highest private prize, the Kyoto Prize, in 2018, for "his discovery of optogenetics and the development of causal systems neuroscience", becoming the youngest recipient of the award to date. In 2019, Deisseroth, Hegemann, Boyden, and Miesenböck won the Warren Alpert Foundation Prize. Finally in 2020, Deisseroth received the Heineken Prize from the Royal Netherlands Academy of Arts and Sciences, "for developing optogenetics — a method to influence the activity of nerve cells with light".

Deisseroth is also known for achieving insight into the light-gated ion channel pore of channelrhodopsin itself, through his team's initial high-resolution crystal structures of cation and anion-conducting channelrhodopsins and through a body of structure/function work discovering mechanisms of channelrhodopsin kinetics, ion selectivity, and color selectivity, together with his frequent collaborator Peter Hegemann.

Although the first peer-reviewed paper demonstrating activation of neurons with a channelrhodopsin was from his lab in mid-2005, Deisseroth has emphasized that many "pioneering laboratories around the world" were also working on the idea and published their papers within the following year; he cites Stefan Herlitze and Alexander Gottschalk/Georg Nagel, who published their papers in late 2005, and Hiromu Yawo and Zhuo-Hua Pan, who published their initial papers in 2006 (Pan's early observation of optical activation of retinal neurons expressing channelrhodopsin would have occurred in August 2004, according to Pan, about a month after Deisseroth's initial observation). Deisseroth has published the notebook pages from early July 2004 of his initial experiment showing light activation of neurons expressing a channelrhodopsin. Deisseroth also pointed out that an even earlier experiment had occurred and was published by Heberle and Büldt in 1994, in which functional heterologous expression of a bacteriorhodopsin for light-activated ion flow had been published in a non-neural system (yeast). Optogenetics with microbial opsins as a general technology for neuroscience was enabled only by the full development of versatile strategies for targeting opsins and light to specific cells in behaving animals by taking advantage of Cre-lox neurogenetics developed by Joe Tsien in the 1990s.

=== Functional materials ===
Deisseroth is also known for a separate class of technological innovation. His group has developed methods for chemically assembling functional materials within biological tissue. This approach has a range of applications, including probing the molecular composition and wiring of cells within intact brains.

In 2013, Deisseroth was the senior author of a paper describing the initial form of this method, called CLARITY (with a team including first author Kwanghun Chung, a postdoctoral fellow in his lab, and neuroscientist Viviana Gradinaru). This method makes biological tissues, such as mammalian brains, translucent and accessible to molecular probes. CLARITY has been widely used, and many variants on the basic HTC backbone have been developed in other labs as well since 2013 (reviewed in).

A key feature of HTC is that the hydrogel-tissue hybrid "becomes the substrate for future chemical and optical interrogation that can be probed and manipulated in new ways". For example, HTC variants now enable improved anchoring and amplification of RNA, reversible size changes (contraction or expansion), and in situ sequencing (reviewed in). In particular, STARmap is an HTC variant that allows three-dimensional cellular-resolution transcriptomic readouts within intact tissue.)

== Personal life ==
Deisseroth is married to neuroscientist Michelle Monje, with whom he has four children. He also has a son from a previous relationship.

== Lists ==
=== List of selected publications ===
Deisseroth has published influential work on optogenetics, neural-circuit methods, and tissue-clearing techniques, while also writing about neuroscience for general audiences.

==== Academic ====
- Boyden, E. S.; Zhang, F.; Bamberg, E.; Nagel, G.; Deisseroth, K. (2005). “Millisecond-timescale, genetically targeted optical control of neural activity.” Nature Neuroscience. 8: 1263–1268.
- Chung, K.; Deisseroth, K. (2013). “CLARITY for mapping the nervous system.” Nature Methods. 10: 508–513.
- Deisseroth, K. (2015). “Optogenetics: 10 years of microbial opsins in neuroscience.” Nature Neuroscience. 18: 1213–1225.

==== Public writing ====
- Deisseroth, K. (2010). “Controlling the Brain with Light.” Scientific American.
- Deisseroth, K. (2016). “Building a See-Through Brain.” Scientific American.

=== List of honors and awards ===
Three major prizes paid particular attention to Deisseroth's work on elucidation of the structure and function of light-gated ion channels—the 2016 Harvey Prize to Deisseroth and Hegemann for the "discovery of opsin molecules, involved in sensing light in microorganisms, and for the pioneering work in utilizing these opsins to develop optogenetics", the 2018 Gairdner Award, which noted "his group discovered the fundamental principles of the unique channelrhodopsin proteins in molecular detail by a wide range of genomic, biophysical, electrophysiological and structural techniques with many mutants in close collaboration with Peter Hegemann"), and the 2026 Nobel Prize in Medicine and Physiology for his work on optogenetics. Several major prizes have cited Deisseroth's development of HTC, including:

- The 2017 Fresenius Prize "for his discoveries in optogenetics and hydrogel-tissue chemistry, as well as his research into the neural circuit basis of depression".
- The 2015 Lurie Prize in Biomedical Sciences "for leading the development of optogenetics, a technology for controlling cells with light to determine function, as well as for CLARITY, a method for transforming intact organs into transparent polymer gels to allow visualization of biological structures with high resolution and detail".
- The 2013 Premio Citta di Firenze
- The Redelsheimer Award for "optogenetics, CLARITY, and other novel and powerful neural circuit approaches in furthering the field's understanding of the neuroscience underlying behavior".
- The 2015 Dickson Prize in Medicine
- The 2020 Heineken Prize for Medicine, for "developing optogenetics — a method to influence the activity of nerve cells with light — as well as for developing hydrogel-tissue chemistry, which enables researchers to make biological tissue accessible to light and molecular probes."
- Deisseroth's 2018 Kyoto Prize cited his "causal systems neuroscience".
- The 2013 Pasarow Prize was awarded to Deisseroth for "neuropsychiatry research".
- The 2013 Premio Citta di Firenze was given to Deisseroth for "innovative technologies to probe the structure and dynamics of circuits related to schizophrenia, autism, narcolepsy, Parkinson's disease, depression, anxiety and addiction".
- The Redelsheimer Award from the Society for Biological Psychiatry was awarded to Deisseroth for "furthering the field's understanding of the neuroscience underlying behavior".
- Deisseroth's 2017 Fresenius Prize cited "his discoveries in optogenetics and hydrogel-tissue chemistry, as well as his research into the neural circuit basis of depression".
- 2005 Presidential Early Career Award for Scientists and Engineers
- 2010 Nakasone Award, Human Frontier Science Program
- 2010 Koetser Award for Brain Research
- 2011 W. Alden Spencer Award
- 2012 Zuelch Prize, with Peter Hegemann, Georg Nagel, and Ernst Bamberg
- 2012 Perl-UNC Prize
- 2013 Premio Città di Firenze
- 2013 Goldman-Rakic award, Brain & Behavior Research Foundation
- 2013 Jacob Heskel Gabbay Award
- 2013 Brain Prize
- 2013 Robert J. and Claire Pasarow Foundation Medical Research Award
- 2013 Richard Lounsbery Award
- 2013 Dickson Prize in Science
- 2014 Keio Medical Science Prize
- 2015 Albany Medical Center Prize
- 2015 Lurie Prize in Biomedical Sciences
- 2015 Breakthrough Prize in Life Sciences
- 2015 Dickson Prize in Medicine
- 2015 BBVA Foundation Frontiers of Knowledge Award
- 2016 Massry Prize, with Peter Hegemann and Gero Miesenböck
- 2017 Redelsheimer Award, Society for Biological Psychiatry
- 2017 Fresenius Prize, Else Kröner-Fresenius Foundation
- 2017 Harvey Prize, with Peter Hegemann
- 2018 Leibinger Prize
- 2018 Eisenberg Prize, University of Michigan
- 2018 Canada Gairdner International Award
- 2018 Kyoto Prize (Advanced Technology)
- 2019 Warren Alpert Foundation Prize, with Ed Boyden, Peter Hegemann, and Gero Miesenböck
- 2019 National Academy of Engineering membership
- 2020 Heineken Prize for Medicine
- 2021 Albert Lasker Award for Basic Medical Research
- 2022 Louisa Gross Horwitz Prize
- 2023 Japan Prize, with Gero Miesenböck
- 2025 Asan Award in Medicine
- 2026 Nobel Prize in Physiology or Medicine
