= Max Planck Institute of Biophysics =

Research institute in Frankfurt, Germany

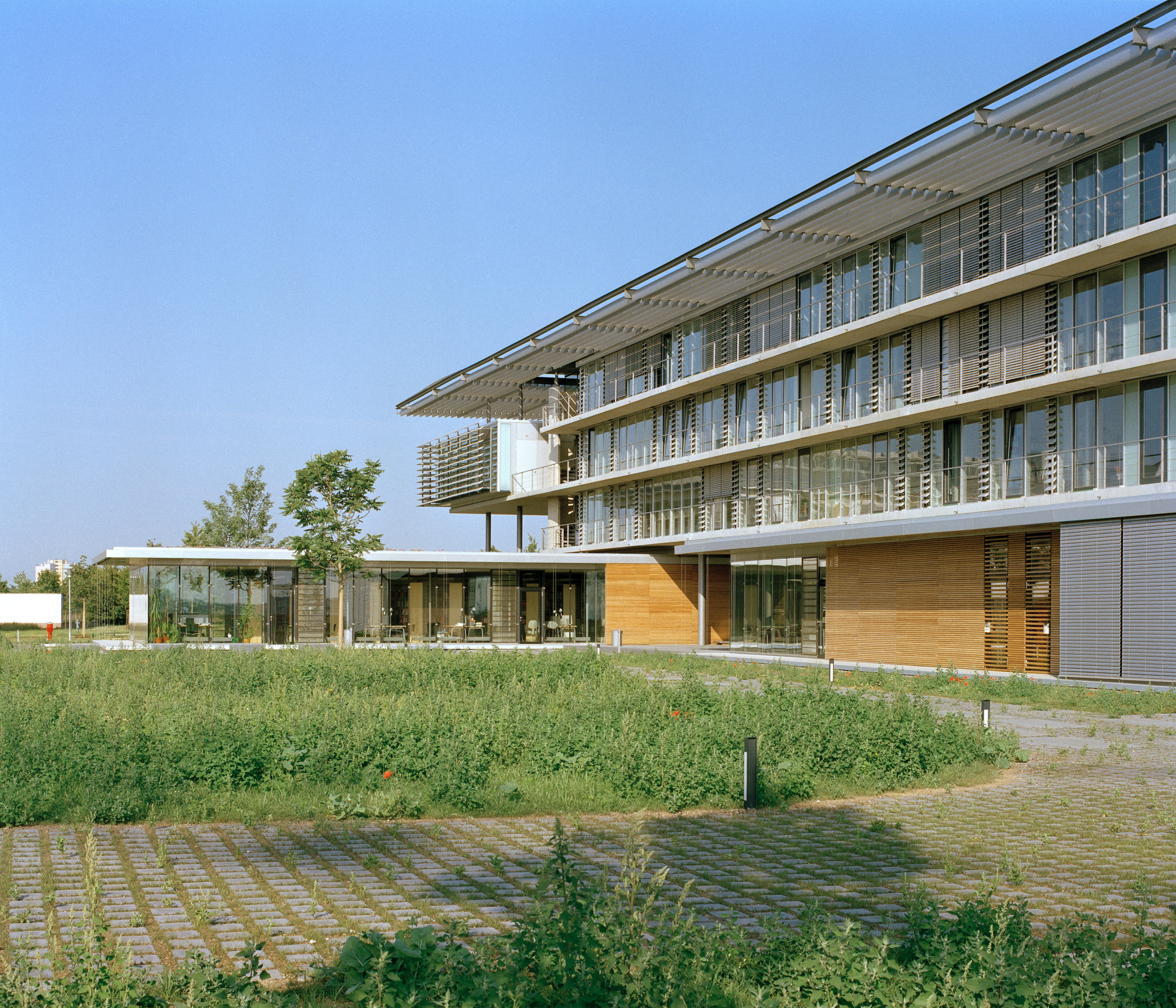
Building of Max Planck Institute of Biophysics

The Max Planck Institute of Biophysics (German: Max-Planck-Institut für Biophysik) is located in Frankfurt, Germany. It was founded as the Kaiser Wilhelm Institute of Biophysics in 1937, and moved into a new building in 2003. It is an institute of the Max Planck Society.

Since March 2003, the MPI for Biophysics has resided in a new building on the Riedberg campus of the Goethe University Frankfurt in the north of the city. At the end of 2016, a total of 178 employees were working at the institute, including 48 scientists and 50 junior researchers. The Nobel Prize winner Hartmut Michel was the director of the institute starting 1987 until he was replaced by Ana J. García-Sáez in October 2023. Scientific links to fellow researchers at Goethe University have been strengthened further, as the institute is now situated next to the university's biology, chemistry and physics laboratories. Together with the Max Planck Institute for Brain Research and the Goethe University the institute run the International Max Planck Research School (IMPRS) for Structure and Function of Biological Membranes, a graduate program offering a Ph.D. in the period from 2000 until 2012.

== Departments ==
- Molecular Membrane Biology (Hartmut Michel, since 1987)
- Structural Biology (Werner Kühlbrandt, since 1997)
- Biophysical Chemistry (Ernst Bamberg, since 1993, em. since 2016)
- Theoretical Biophysics (Gerhard Hummer, since 2013)
- Molecular Sociology (Martin Beck, since 2019)
- Molecular Neurogenetics (Peter Mombaerts, from 2006 until 2010)

A prerequisite for the understanding of the fundamental processes of life is the knowledge of the structure of the participating macromolecules. Two of the four departments are devoted to the challenging task of determining the structure of membrane proteins. Under the direction of Hartmut Michel (Nobel Prize in Chemistry of 1988 for the first structure determination of a membrane protein), the Department of Molecular Membrane Biology approaches this problem primarily by x-ray crystallography, whereas the Department of Structural Biology, headed by Werner Kühlbrandt, uses the complementary technique of electron microscopy. The Department of Biophysical Chemistry, directed by Ernst Bamberg, studies the function of these proteins in native or reconstituted membranes by electrophysiological and spectroscopic methods. Since 2013, the institute hosts the Department of Theoretical Biophysics, directed by Gerhard Hummer focusing on development and implementation of broad range of computational and theoretical methods to bridge fundamental physics, chemistry and biology of molecular systems. In the Department of Molecular Sociology integrative cellular structural biology is studied by cryo-electron microscopy, biochemical and mass spectroscopic methods applied to nuclear pores, macromolecular machines that are responsible for the communication between the cell nucleus and the cytoplasm.

== Institute's history ==
The institute was founded in Frankfurt am Main as the "Kaiser Wilhelm Institute of Biophysics" in 1937. However, it had a predecessor, the "Institut für Physikalische Grundlagen der Medizin" which had been established in 1921 by Friedrich Dessauer, an admirer of Wilhelm Röntgen, who endeavored to apply radiation physics to medicine and biology. Being a conservative member of parliament for the democratic "Zentrumspartei", Dessauer opposed the National Socialists' rise to power and was then forced to emigrate in 1934. His successor, Dessauer's colleague and long-standing collaborator, Boris Rajewsky was the first director of the Kaiser Wilhelm Institute of Biophysics. Rajewsky firstly coined the term "Biophysics" and consequently the institute became one of the first to be known by this name. Research has been conducted primarily on the effects of radioactive radiation on humans and possible medical use, and on aerosols.

After the Second World War, the institute was reopened in 1948 as the "Max Planck Institute of Biophysics". With the retirement of Boris Rajewsky in 1966 and the appointment of Reinhard Schlögl in 1965, the research work was oriented away from work with radioactive radiation towards the investigation of "mass transport through biological and artificial membranes". With the subsequent appointment of Karl Julius Ullrich in 1967 and finally Hermann Passow in 1968 as new directors of the institute, the management of the Max Planck Institute of Biophysics also developed away from the classic one-director institute to a more modern board of directors. The main focus of research was (and still is) the investigation of the cell membrane and its building blocks, the membrane proteins (and especially the transport proteins). The cell membranes and the proteins were and are being investigated using the most modern physical methods available at the time, including

- X-ray crystallography
- high-resolution electron microscopy
- Spectroscopy

This development was initiated, especially after the retirement of Passow and Ullrich in 1993 and Schlögl in 1996, by the appointment of a new generation of directors, in 1987 by Hartmut Michel (Dept. of Molecular Membrane Biology), in 1993 by Ernst Bamberg (Dept. of Biophysical Chemistry) and in 1996 by Werner Kühlbrandt (Dept. of Structural Biology).

== Architecture ==
The functional new building of the MPIBP on the Riedberg university campus is divided into two halves by an entrance hall running continuously in an east–west direction. The laboratories and other research facilities of the institute are located in the northern half, while the offices and meeting rooms of the scientists and the administration are located in the southern half from the first floor onwards. For fast communication, the two halves are connected by bridges spanning the entrance hall. The architects of the new building were the Auer Weber Assoziierte GmbH in Stuttgart.

== Miscellaneous ==
Since the founding of the MPI of Biophysics, one of the directors has also held a chair at Frankfurt's Goethe University.

In cooperation with other MPIs (for Biochemistry, Medical Research, and Molecular Physiology) it operates its own beamline at the Swiss Light Source (SLS) in Switzerland, "one of the most modern and powerful "third generation" synchrotron radiation sources in Europe" (source), in order to avoid the normally long waiting times for a measurement. The sharply focused and intense synchrotron radiation (X-rays) is intended to enable, among other things, large protein complexes to be better investigated by X-ray structure analysis.
