= Rumford Prize =

American science prize

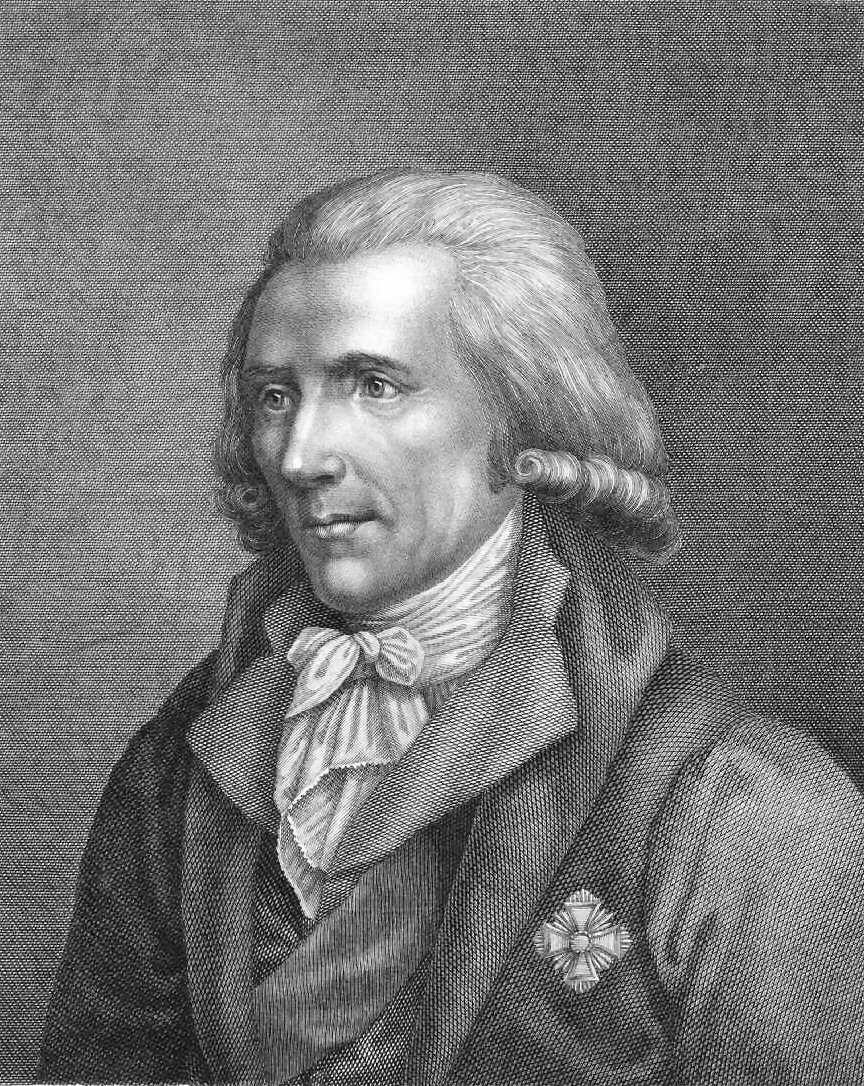
- Benjamin Thompson, whose grant paid for the formation of the Rumford Prize
- Awarded for: Contributions to the fields of heat and light
- Country: United States
- Presented by: American Academy of Arts and Sciences
- First award: 1839
- Final award: 2021
- Website: amacad.org/about/prizes

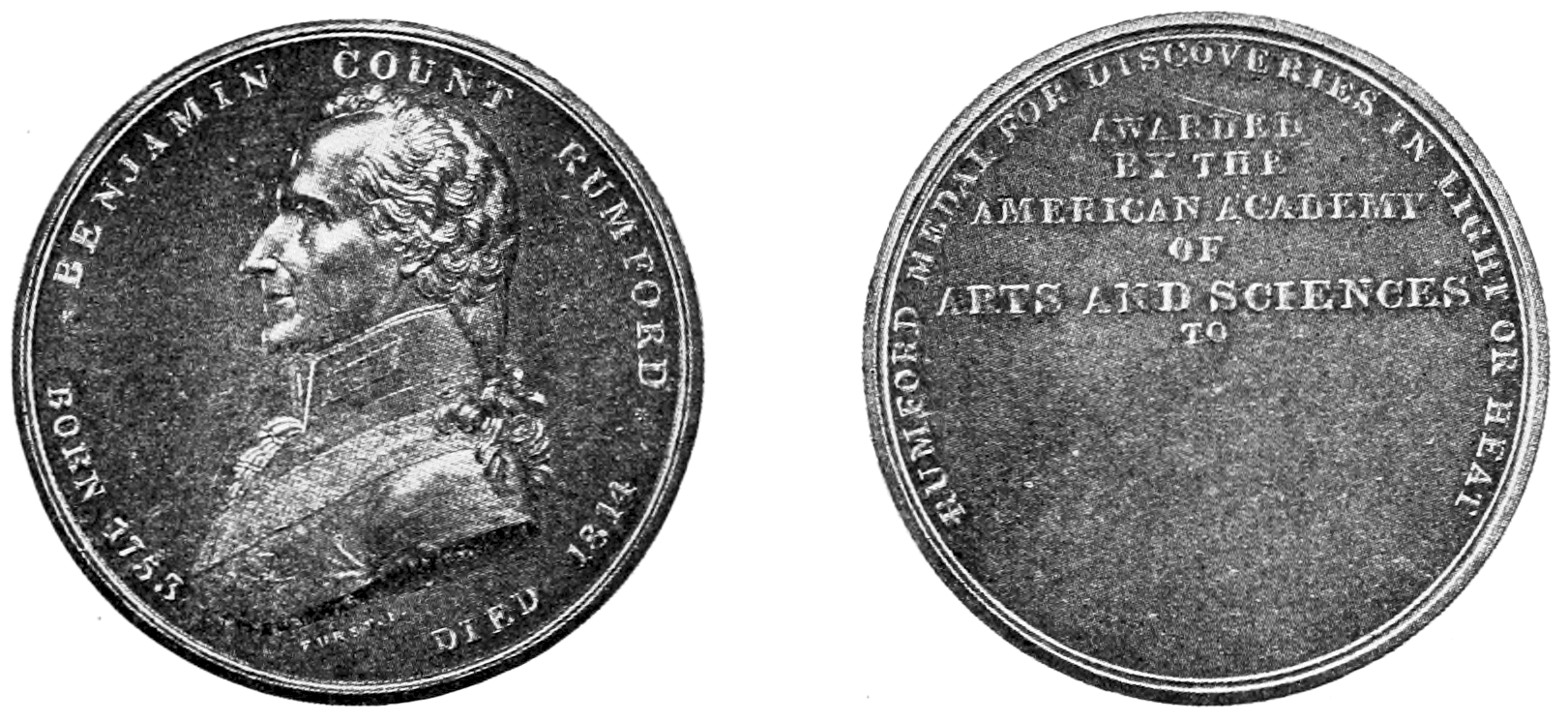
Rumford Medal of the American Academy of Arts and Sciences

Founded in 1796, the Rumford Prize, awarded by the American Academy of Arts and Sciences, is one of the oldest scientific prizes in the United States. The prize recognizes contributions by scientists to the fields of heat and light. These terms are widely interpreted; awards range from discoveries in thermodynamics to improvements in the construction of steam boilers.

The award was created through the endowment of US$5,000 to the academy by Benjamin Thompson, who held the title "Count Rumford of the United Kingdom", in 1796. The terms state that the award be given to "authors of discoverie's in any part of the Continent of America, or in any of the American islands." Although it was founded in 1796, the first prize was not given until 1839, as the academy could not find anyone who, in their judgement, deserved the award. The academy found the terms of the prize to be too restrictive, and in 1832 the Supreme Court of Massachusetts allowed the academy to change some of the provisions; mainly, the award was to be given annually instead of biennially, and the academy was allowed to award the prize as it saw fit, whereas before it had to give it yearly. The first award was given to Robert Hare, for his invention of the oxy-hydrogen blowpipe, in 1839. Twenty-three years elapsed before the award was given a second time, to John Ericsson.

The prize is awarded whenever the academy recognizes a significant achievement in either of the two fields. Awardees receive a gold-and-silver medal. Previous prizewinners include Thomas Alva Edison, for his investigations in electric lighting; Enrico Fermi, for his studies of radiation theory and nuclear energy; and Charles H. Townes, for his development of the maser and the laser. One man, Samuel Pierpont Langley, has won both the Rumford Prize and the related Rumford Medal (the European equivalent of the Rumford Prize), both in 1886. The most recent award was given in 2021 to Charles L. Bennett for his contributions to cosmology. The prize has been given to researchers outside of the United States only twice—once to John Stanley Plaskett, from British Columbia, and once to a group of Canadian scientists "for their work in the field of long-baseline interferometry."

== List of recipients ==
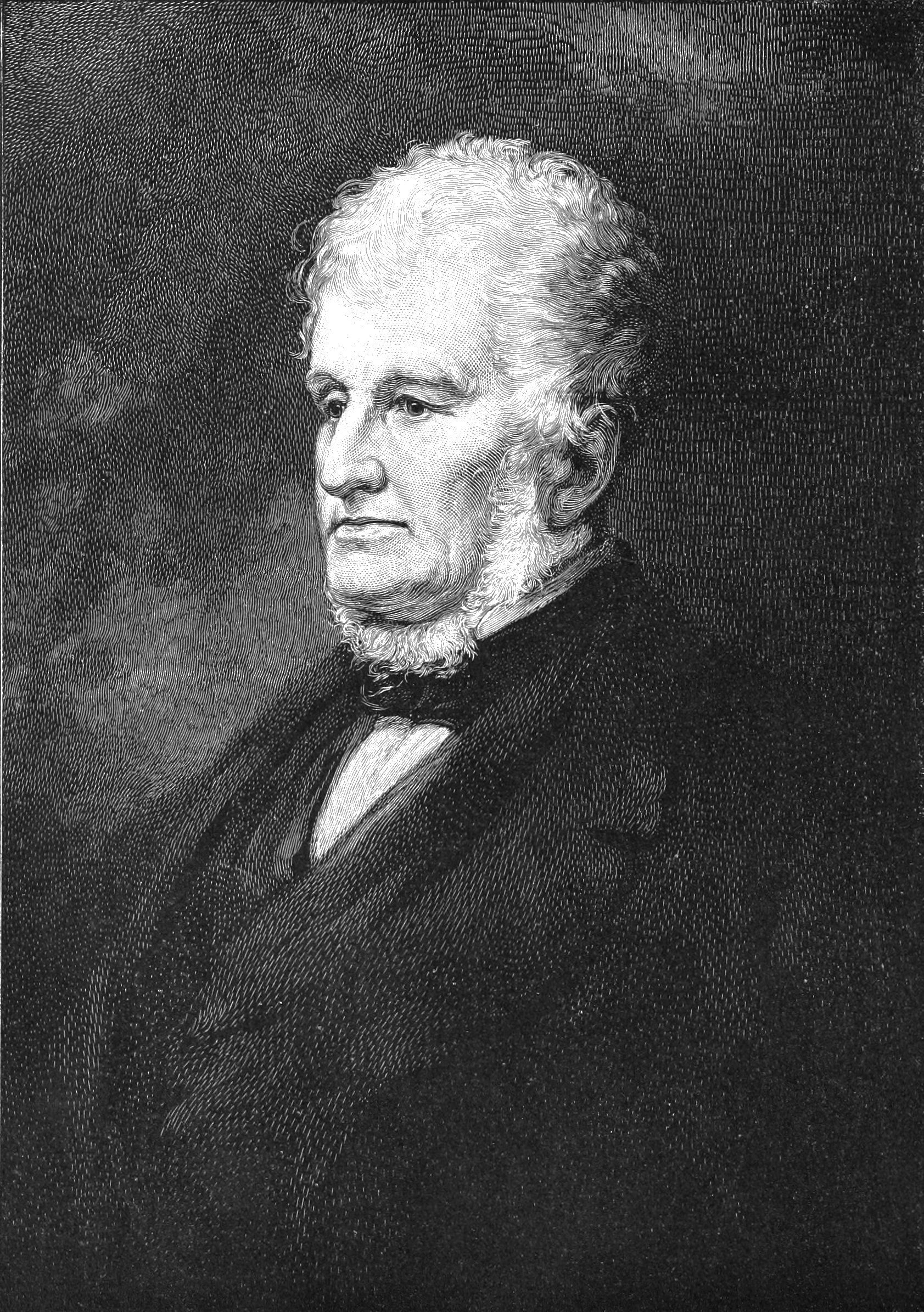
Robert Hare, first recipient of the prize in 1839

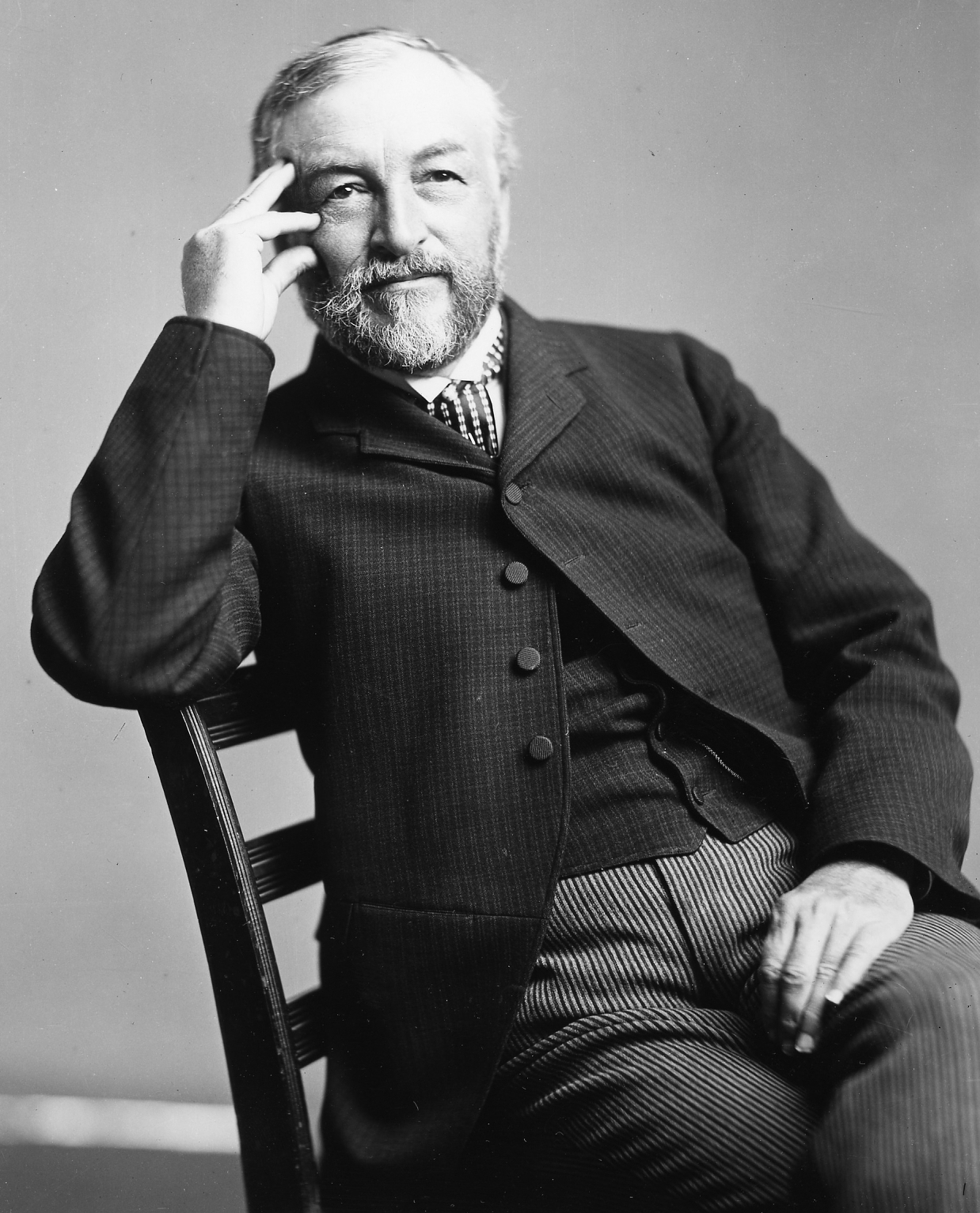
Samuel Pierpont Langley, 1886 recipient

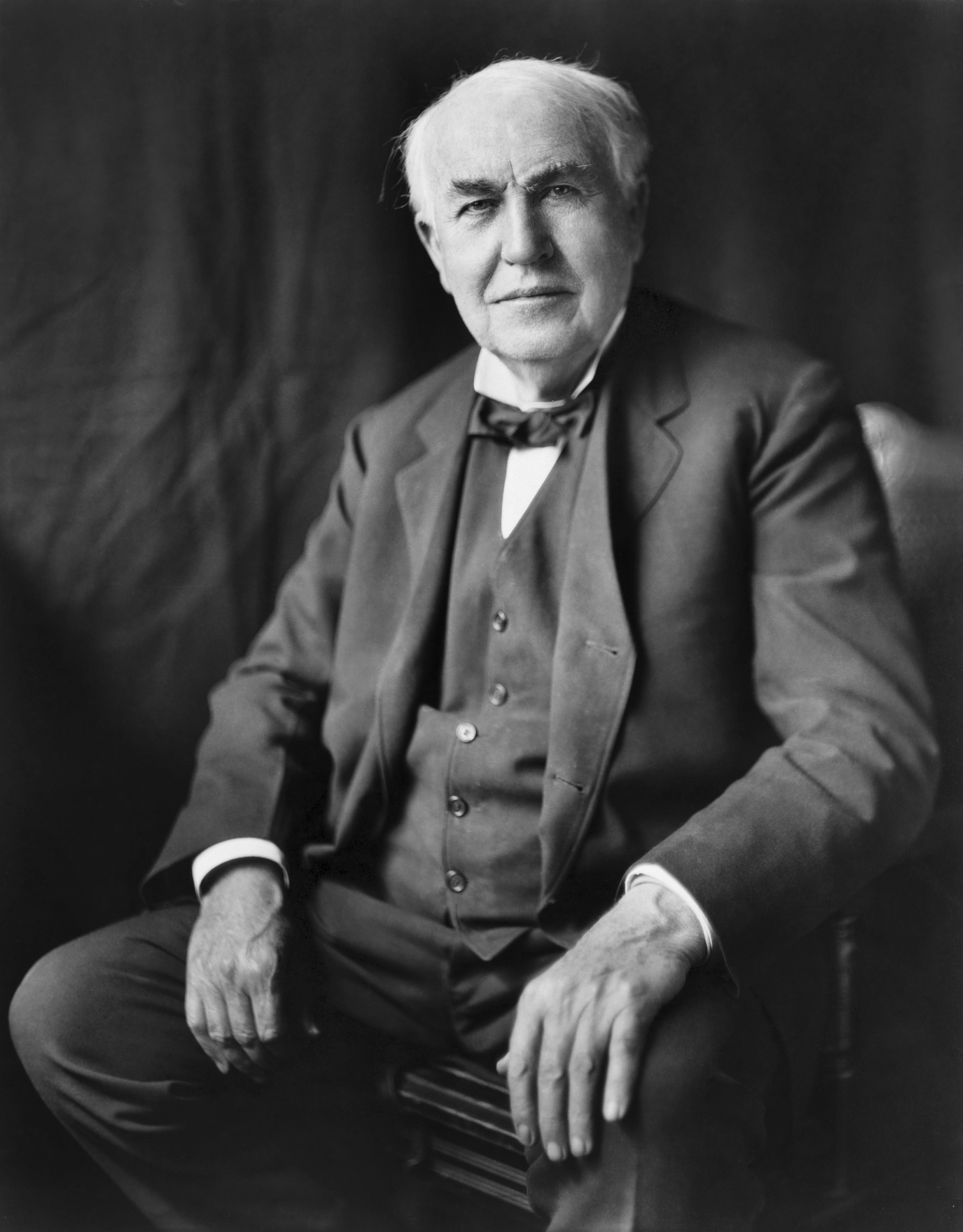
Thomas Alva Edison, 1895 recipient

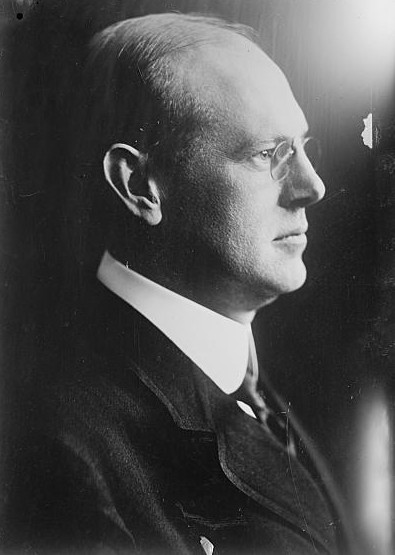
Ernest Fox Nichols, 1904 recipient

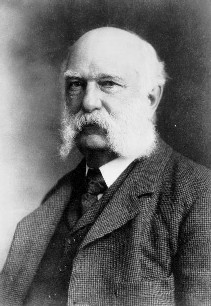
James M. Crafts, 1911 recipient

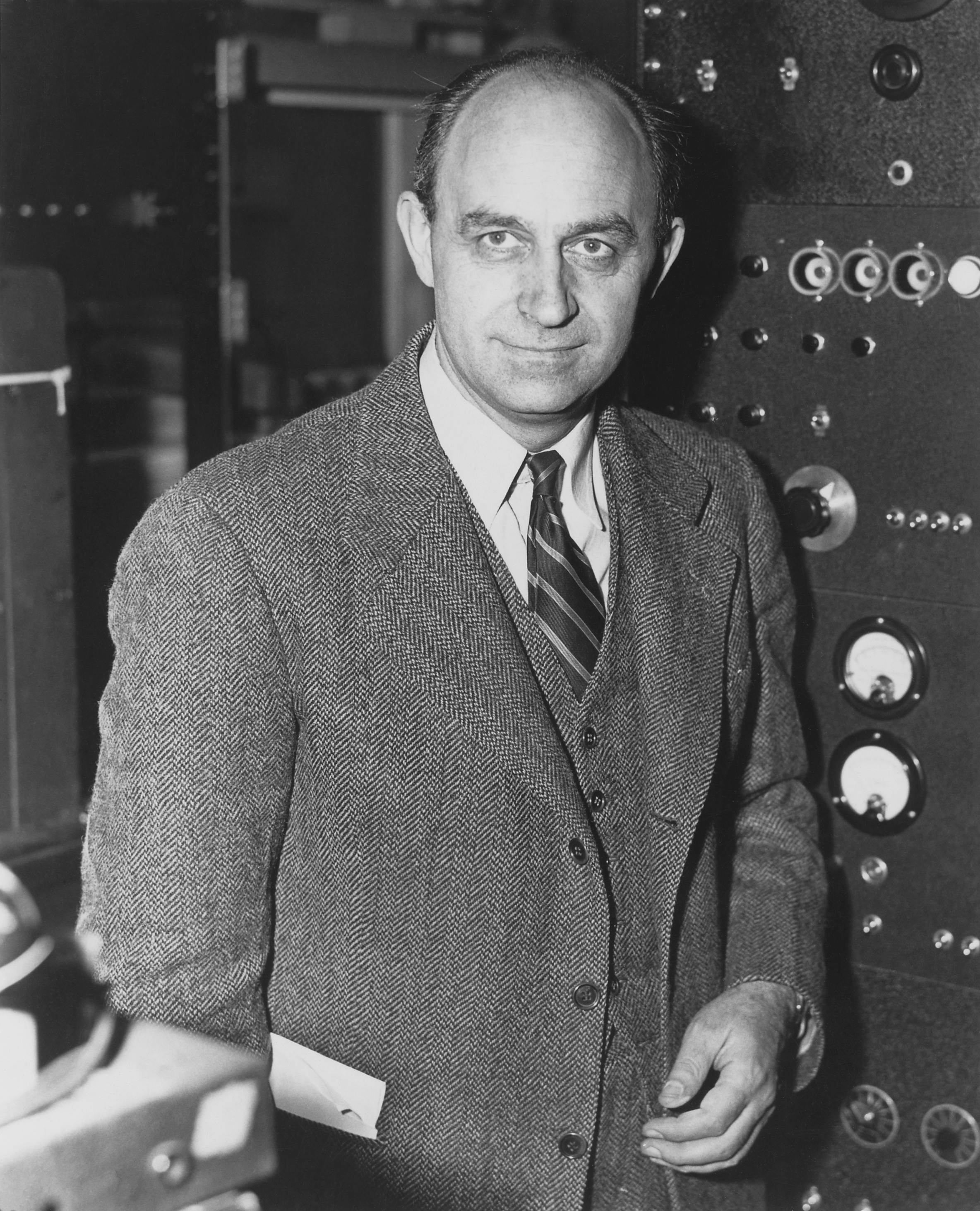
Enrico Fermi, 1953 recipient

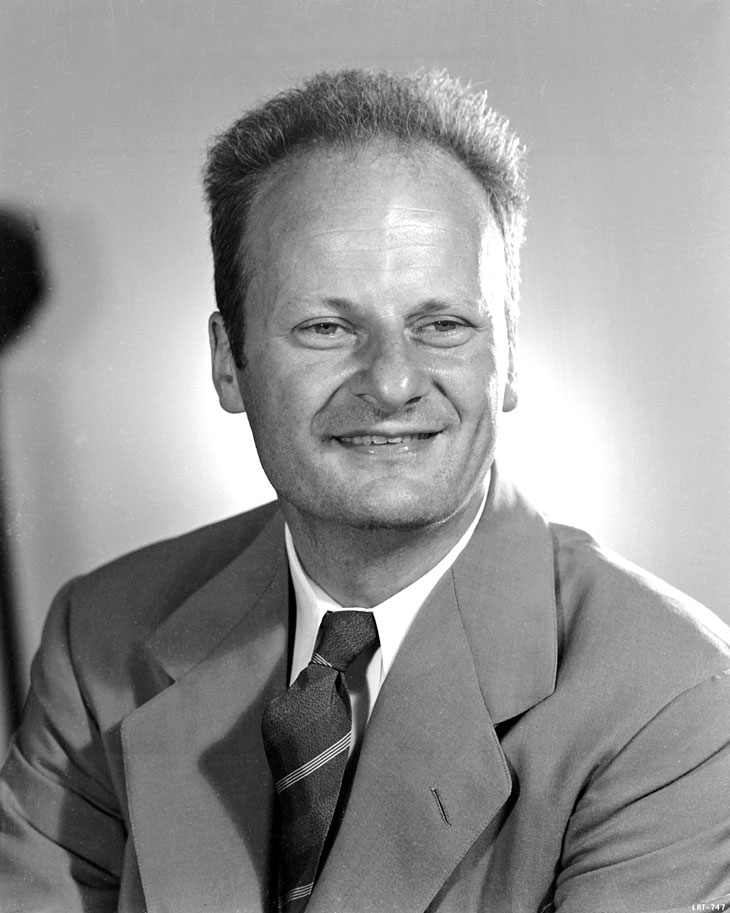
Hans Bethe,1963 recipient

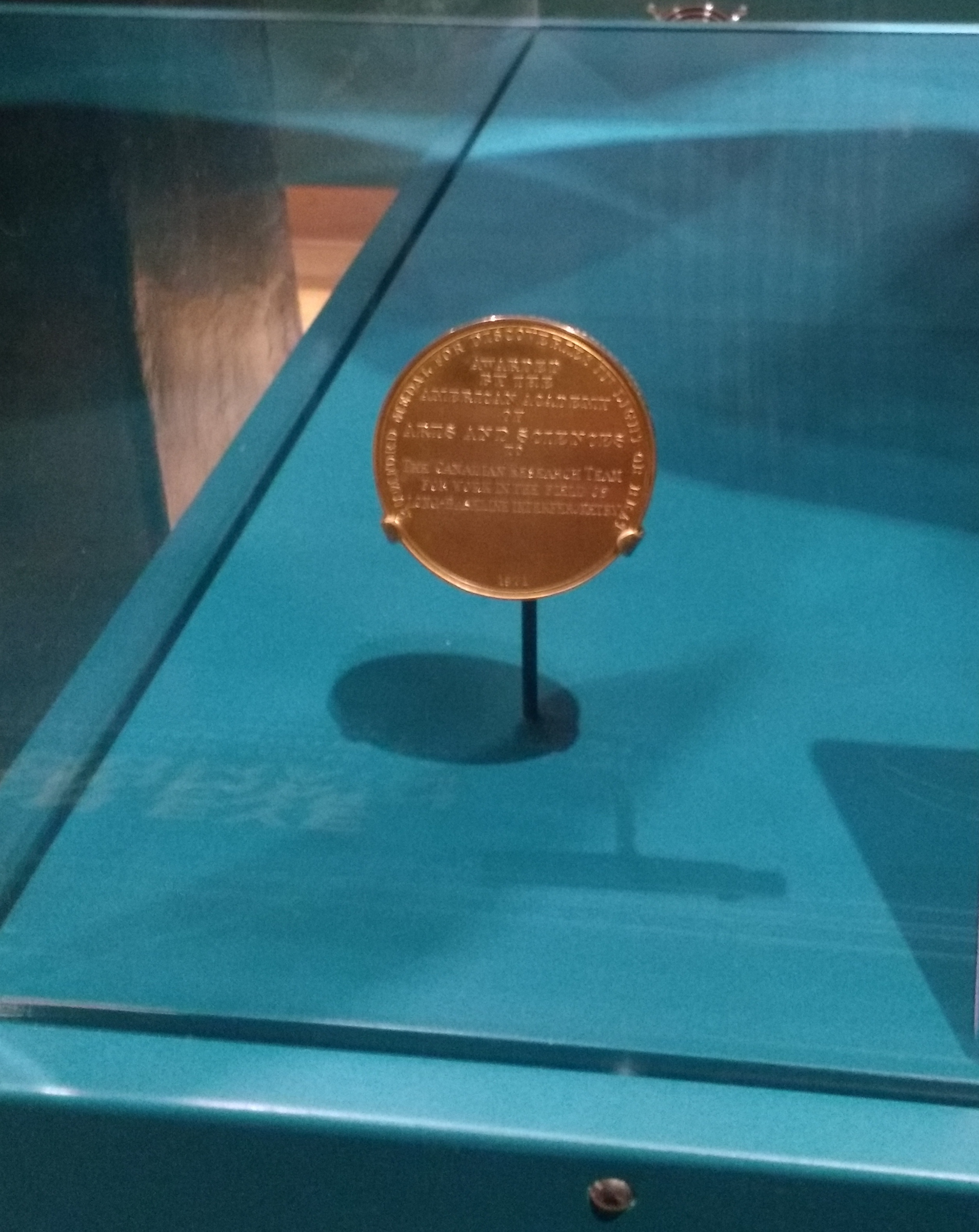
1971 Rumford Prize won by the Canadian Group

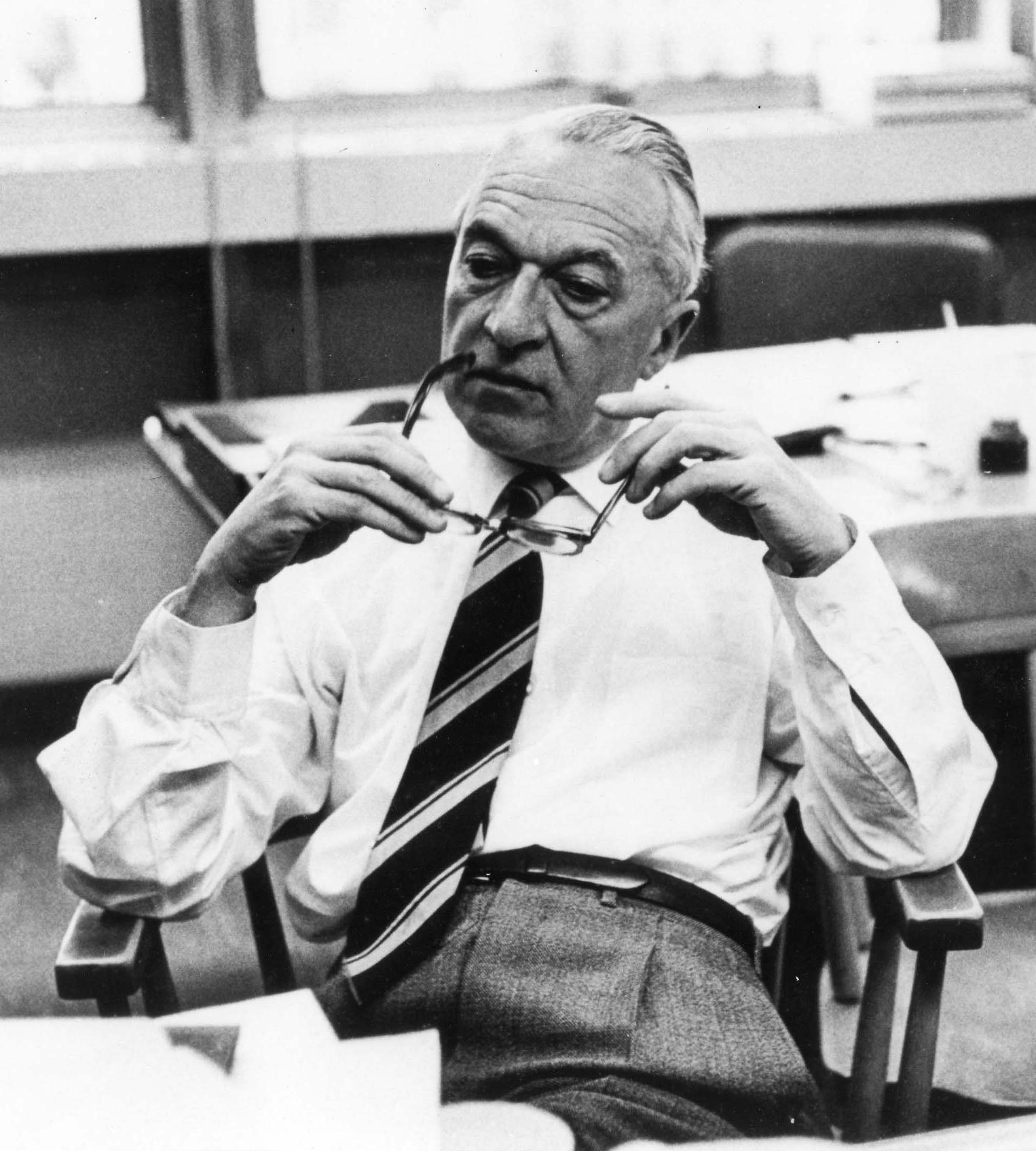
Bruno Rossi, 1976 recipient

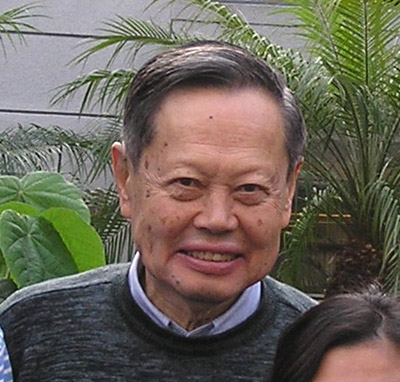
Chen Ning Yang, 1980 recipient

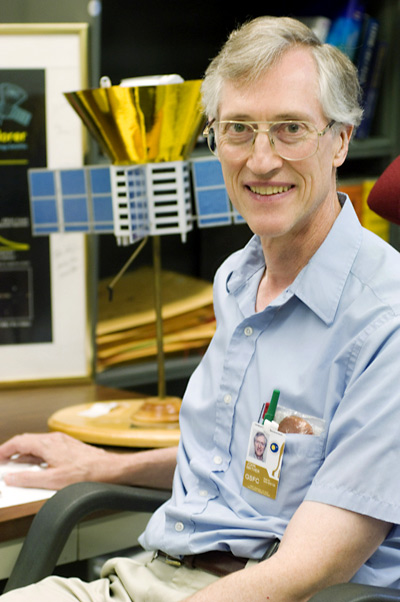
John C. Mather, 1996 recipient

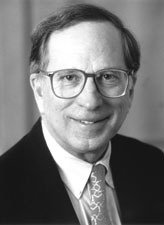
Sam Nunn, 2008 recipient

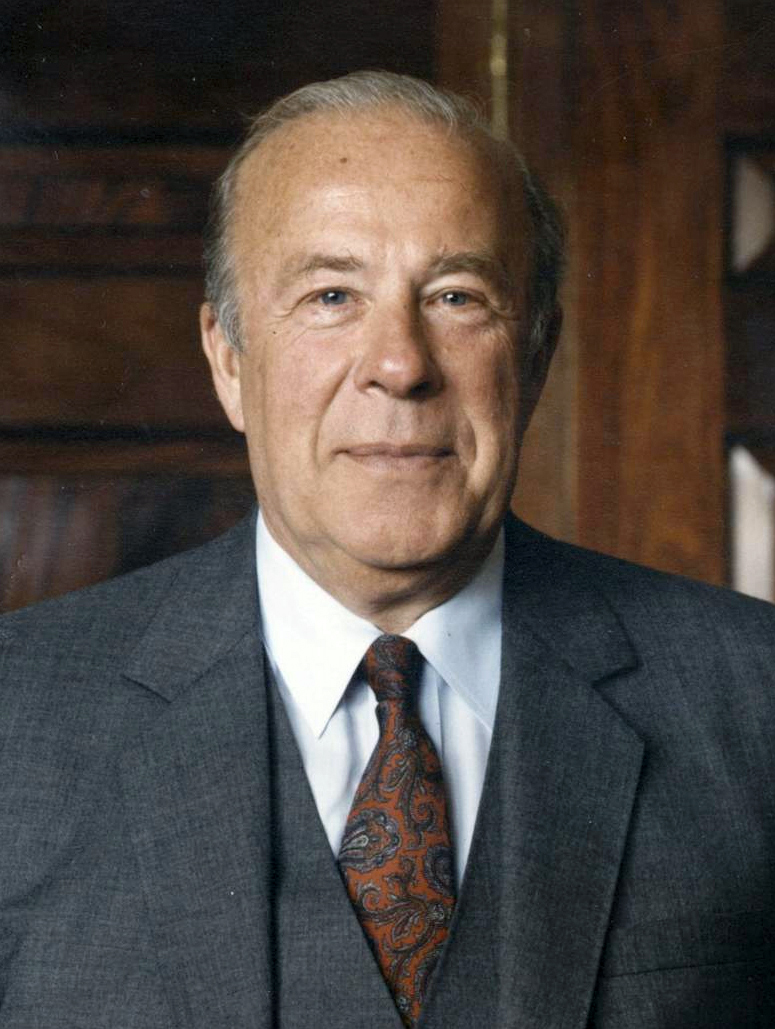
George P. Shultz, 2008 recipient

Source: American Academy of Arts and Sciences: Past Prizes

Year	Name	Location^{[a]}	Rationale
1839	Robert Hare	Philadelphia, Pennsylvania	Inventor of the oxy-hydrogen blowpipe
1862	John Ericsson	New York, New York	His work improved the field of heat management, but the award was specifically for his invention of the caloric engine of 1858.
1865	Daniel Treadwell	Cambridge, Massachusetts	Heat management. He was awarded especially for his contributions towards a "cannon of large caliber, and great strength and endurance".
1866	Alvan Clark	Cambridge, Massachusetts	Improved refracting telescopes
1869	George Henry Corliss	Providence, Rhode Island	For improving the steam engine
1871	Joseph Harrison Jr.	Philadelphia, Pennsylvania	Towards his concern for safer steam boilers
1873	Lewis Morris Rutherfurd	New York, New York	For improving the "processes and methods" of astronomical photography
1875	John William Draper	New York, New York	For his work towards apprehending radiant energy
1880	Josiah Willard Gibbs	New Haven, Connecticut	Founded the field of chemical thermodynamics
1883	Henry Augustus Rowland	Baltimore, Maryland	For his research in light and heat
1886	Samuel Pierpont Langley	Allegheny, Philadelphia	For his work towards the understanding of radiant energy
1888	Albert Abraham Michelson	Cleveland, Ohio	Measured the velocity of light, and contribution towards the motion of the luminiferous ether, and absolute determination of the wavelengths of light
1891	Edward Charles Pickering	Cambridge, Massachusetts	For his work on stellar photometry and stellar spectra
1895	Thomas Alva Edison	Orange, New Jersey	For his investigations in electric lighting
1898	James Edward Keeler	Allegheny, Pennsylvania	For the applications of the spectroscope, and especially his investigations of nebulae and the physical contents of Saturn's rings
1899	Charles Francis Brush	Cleveland, Ohio	For the development of the electric arc lamp
1900	Carl Barus	Providence, Rhode Island	For his heat research
1901	Elihu Thomson	Lynn, Massachusetts	For his work in welding and lighting
1902	George Ellery Hale	Chicago, Illinois	For his investigations in solar and stellar physics and for the invention of the spectro-heliograph
1904	Ernest Fox Nichols	New York, New York	For his research on radiation, radiation pressure, stellar heat, and the infrared spectrum
1907	Edward Goodrich Acheson	Niagara Falls, New York	For the application of the electric furnace to the production of carborundum and graphite
1909	Robert Williams Wood	Baltimore, Maryland	For light-related discoveries, including the optical properties of sodium and other metallic vapors
1910	Charles Gordon Curtis	New York, New York	For his improvements to the steam turbine
1911	James Mason Crafts	Boston, Massachusetts	For his work in thermometry, and the development of new fixed points on the scale.^{[b]}
1912	Frederic Eugene Ives	Woodcliff-on-Hudson, New Jersey	For his inventions in color photography and photoengraving
1913	Joel Stebbins	Urbana, Illinois	For the development of the selenium photometer and its application to scientific problems
1914	William David Coolidge	Schenectady, New York	For his invention of ductile tungsten
1915	Charles Greeley Abbot	Washington, D.C.	For his research in solar radiation
1917	Percy Williams Bridgman	Cambridge, Massachusetts	For his high-pressure thermodynamic breakthroughs
1918	Theodore Lyman	Cambridge, Massachusetts	Awarded for his research on short-wave and long-wave wavelengths
1920	Irving Langmuir	Schenectady, New York	"For his research in thermionic and allied phenomena"
1925	Henry Norris Russell	Princeton, New Jersey	Awarded for his research in solar radiation
1926	Arthur Holly Compton	Chicago, Illinois	Awarded for his research in Roentgen rays
1928	Edward Leamington Nichols	Ithaca, New York	"For his research in spectrophotometry"
1930	John Stanley Plaskett	Victoria, British Columbia	For his astronomical spectrographic research^{[c]}
1931	Karl Taylor Compton	Cambridge, Massachusetts	He was awarded the medal for thermionics and spectroscopic research.
1933	Harlow Shapley	Cambridge, Massachusetts	For his work with the luminosity of stars and galaxies
1937	William Weber Coblentz	Washington, D.C.	For his improvements in the measurement of heat and light
1939	George Russell Harrison	Belmont, Massachusetts	"For pioneering improvements in spectroscopics"
1941	Vladimir Kosma Zworykin	Princeton, New Jersey	Awarded for the creation of the iconoscope and other related devices
1943	Charles Edward Mees	Rochester, New York	For his contributions to photography
1945	Edwin Herbert Land	Cambridge, Massachusetts	For his inventions related to the application of polarized light
1947	E. Newton Harvey	Princeton, New Jersey	For his research in bioluminescence
1949	Ira Sprague Bowen	Pasadena, California	For his work on the identification of nebulium and for other outstanding works
1951	Herbert E. Ives	Montclair, New Jersey	For his research in the field of optics
1953	Enrico Fermi	Chicago, Illinois	For his investigations in electromagnetic radiation and nuclear energy
1953	Willis E. Lamb Jr.	Stanford, California	Awarded for studying the hydrogen spectrum
1953	Lars Onsager	New Haven, Connecticut	For his investigations in thermodynamics related to transportation
1955	James Franck	Chicago, Illinois	For his studies in the investigation of photosynthesis
1957	Subrahmanyan Chandrasekhar	Williams Bay, Wisconsin	For his investigations of the radiative energy balance in stars
1959	George Wald	Cambridge, Massachusetts	For identifying the biochemical basis of vision
1961	Charles Hard Townes	New York, New York	"For his development of the laser"
1963	Hans Albrecht Bethe	Ithaca, New York	For pioneering studies in stellar nucleosynthesis
1965	Samuel Cornette Collins	Cambridge, Massachusetts	For the invention of the Collins Helium Cryostat and other pioneering work
1965	William David McElroy	Baltimore, Maryland	For his work on the molecular origin of bioluminescence
1967	Robert Henry Dicke	Princeton, New Jersey	"For his contributions to microwave radiometry and to the understanding of atomic structure"
1967	Cornelius B. Van Niel	Stanford, California	For his contributions to the study of photosynthesis
1968	Maarten Schmidt	Pasadena, California	For his work deducing the spectra of quasi-stellar objects
1971	MIT Group (John. A Ball, Alan H. Barrett, Bernard F. Burke, Joseph C. Carter, Patricia P. Crowther, James M. Moran Jr., Alan E. E. Rogers) Canadian Group (Norman W. Broten, R. M. Chisholm, John A. Galt, Herbert P. Gush, Thomas H. Legg, Jack L. Locke, Charles W. McLeish, Roger S. Richards, Jui Lin Yen) NRAO–Cornell Group (Claude C. Bare, Barry G. Clark, Marshall H. Cohen, David L. Jauncey, Kenneth I. Kellermann)	Massachusetts Institute of Technology (Ball, Barrett, Burke, Carter, Crowther, Moran, Rogers) National Research Council (Canada) (Broten, Legg, Locke, McLeish, Richards); Dominion Radio Astrophysical Observatory (Galt); University of Toronto (Yen); Queen's University (Chisolm); University of British Columbia (Gush) National Radio Astronomy Observatory (Bare, Clark, Kellerman); Cornell University (Cohen, Jauncey)	"For their work in the field of long-baseline interferometry." The Rumford Committee sponsored a symposium on recent developments in the field to mark the unusual circumstances of the 1971 award; it was reported in the January 14, 1972 issue of Science.
1973	E. Bright Wilson	Cambridge, Massachusetts	For pioneering the importance of symmetry in polyatomic molecules and for his active work in the field of microwave spectroscopy
1976	Bruno Rossi	Cambridge, Massachusetts	For discovering the origins of cosmic radiation
1980	Gregorio Weber	Urbana, Illinois	For researching the theory of, and working on the application of, fluorescence
1980	Chen Ning Yang Robert Mills	Stony Brook, New York Columbus, Ohio	"For development of a generalized gauge invariant field theory"
1985	Hans Georg Dehmelt Martin Deutsch Vernon Willard Hughes Norman Foster Ramsey	Seattle, Washington Cambridge, Massachusetts New Haven, Connecticut Cambridge, Massachusetts	Awarded for his work in the field of atomic spectroscopy
1986	Robert B. Leighton Frank J. Low Gerry Neugebauer	Pasadena, California Tucson, Arizona Pasadena, California	For his work in developing infrared astronomy
1992	James R. Norris Joseph J. Katz George Feher	Chicago, Illinois Chicago, Illinois San Diego, California	Awarded for working towards the understanding of photosynthesis
1996	John C. Mather	Greenbelt, Maryland	For his research related to the cosmic microwave background
2008	Sidney D. Drell Sam Nunn William J. Perry George P. Shultz	Stanford University Nuclear Threat Initiative^{[d]} Stanford University Stanford University	For their efforts to reduce the global threat of nuclear weapons
2015	Federico Capasso Alfred Cho	Harvard John A. Paulson School of Engineering and Applied Sciences Alcatel-Lucent Bell Laboratory	For their contributions to the field of laser technology
2018	Ernst Bamberg Ed Boyden Karl Deisseroth Peter Hegemann Gero Miesenböck Georg Nagel	Max-Planck Institute of Biophysics Massachusetts Institute of Technology Stanford University Humboldt University of Berlin University of Oxford University of Würzburg	For "their extraordinary contributions related to the invention and refinement of optogenetics."
2021	Charles L. Bennett	Baltimore, Maryland	For his contributions to the field of cosmology

== See also ==
- List of physics awards

== References and notes ==
- [a] In this sense, location refers to the recipient's place of work or association
