= John William Nicholson =

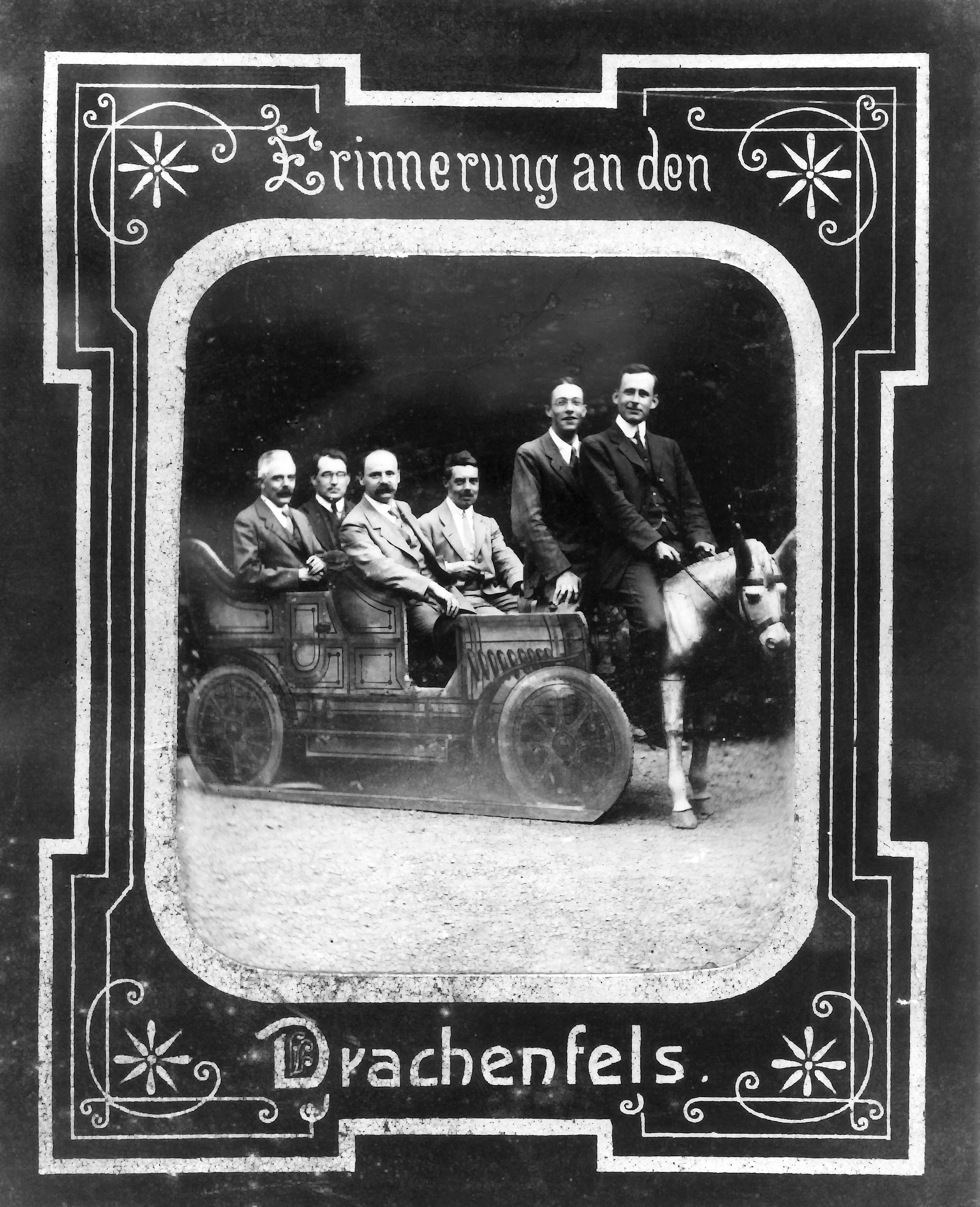
- Nicholson second from left in the automobile, 1913
- Born: 1 November 1881; Darlington, County Durham, England
- Died: 3 October 1955 (aged 73)
- Education: University of Manchester; Trinity College, Cambridge
- Spouse: Dorothy Maud Wrinch
- Awards: Adams Prize (1919); FRS (1917)
- Scientific career
- Fields: Mathematician
- Workplaces: King’s College London; Queen’s University Belfast

John William Nicholson, FRS (1 November 1881 – 3 October 1955) was an English mathematician and physicist. Nicholson is noted as the first to create an atomic model that quantized angular momentum as h/2π. Nicholson was also the first to create a nuclear and quantum theory that explains spectral line radiation as electrons descend toward the nucleus, identifying hitherto unknown solar and nebular spectral lines. Niels Bohr quoted him in his 1913 paper of the Bohr model of the atom.

== Education ==
Nicholson studied at the University of Manchester, residing in Hulme Hall, where he earned a B.Sc. and later an M.Sc. Among his peers was Arthur Stanley Eddington, who became a lifelong friend. They both continued to Trinity College, Cambridge, where Nicholson passed the Mathematical Tripos in 1904 as Twelfth Wrangler. He was awarded the Isaac Newton Studentship in 1906, was a Smith's Prizeman in 1907, and won the Adams Prize in 1913 and 1917.

== Personal life ==
In 1922 Nicholson married Dorothy Maud Wrinch, whom he was supervising as a graduate student in mathematics at King's College London. The couple had one child, Pamela, born in 1927. Nicholson's mental health deteriorated in the late 1920s, and in 1930 he was certified as mentally ill and confined in the Warneford Hospital until his death in 1955. In 1937 Wrinch was granted a divorce on grounds of her husband's insanity. In 1939 Wrinch and her daughter moved to the United States. Nicholson's and Wrinch's daughter died in a fire in 1975.

== Career ==
Nicholson began his academic career as a lecturer at the Cavendish Laboratory in Cambridge and later at Queen’s University Belfast. In 1912, he was appointed Professor of Mathematics at King’s College London, where he taught alongside S. A. F. White. Nicholson was known as an inspiring but occasionally absent-minded lecturer. His students at King's College recalled that, despite sometimes arriving late, his lectures were highly valued for their depth and insight.

Based on the results of astronomical spectroscopy of nebula he proposed in 1911 the existence of several yet undiscovered elements. Coronium with an atomic weight of 0.51282, nebulium with a weight of 1.6281 and protofluorine with a weight of 2.361. Ira Sprague Bowen was able to attribute the spectroscopical lines of nebulium to doubly ionized oxygen making the new elements obsolete for their explanation. Some authors have pointed out the remarkable success that Nicholson's work initially experienced in spite of being founded on concepts that were eventually shown to be incorrect.

== Awards and honours ==
Nicholson was elected a Fellow of the Royal Society of London in 1917. In 1919, Nicholson won the Adams Prize. In 1921 he was elected into a Fellowship at Balliol College, Oxford.

== Papers by John William Nicholson ==
- On electrical vibrations between confocal elliptic cylinders, with special reference to short waves. Phil. Mag. 10, 225-236. (1905)
- On the diffraction of short waves by a rigid sphere. Phil. Mag. 11, 193-205.
- A general solution of the electromagnetic relations. Phil. Mag. 13, 259-265.
- The scattering of sound by spheroids and disks. Phil. Mag. 14, 364-377.
- On the reflexion of waves from a stratum of gradually varying properties, with application to sound. Proc. Roy. Soc. A, 81, 286-299. (1908)
- Inductance in parallel wires. Nature, Loud. 77, 295.
- The simple equivalent of an alternating current in parallel wires. Nature, Loud. 80, 247-248.
- The inductance of two parallel wires. Phil. Mag. 17, 255-275.
- Inductance and resistance in telephone and other circuits. Phil. Mag. 18, 417-432.
- The scattering of light by a large conducting sphere. Proc. Lond. Math. Soc. 9, 67-80. (1910)
- The effective resistance and inductance of a helical coil. Phil. Mag. 19, 77-91.
- On the bending of electric waves round the earth. Phil. Mag. 19, 276-278.
- On the bending of electric waves round a large sphere. Phil. Mag. 19, 516-537, and 20, 157-172.
- The accelerated motion of an electrified sphere. Phil. Mag. 20, 610-618. The accelerated motion of a dielectric sphere. Phil. Mag. 20, 828-835.
- A possible relation between uranium and actinium. Nature, Lond. 87, 515. (1911)
- On the bending of electric waves round a large sphere. Phil. Mag. 21, 62-68, 281-295. (1912)
- "The Constitution of the Solar Corona. II," Month. Not. Roy. Astr. Soc, 72 (1912), 677-692;
- "The Constitution of the Solar Corona. III," ibid., 729-739.
- On the damping of the vibrations of a dielectric sphere, and the radiation from a vibrating electron. Phil. Mag. 21, 438-446.
- On the number of electrons concerned in metallic conduction. Phil. Mag. 22, 245-266.
- Note on optical properties of fused metals. Phil. Mag. 22, 266-268.
- On the bending of electric waves round a large sphere. Phil. Mag. 24, 755-765.
- The pressure of radiation on a cylindrical obstacle. Proc. Lond. Math. Soc. 11, 104-126.
- The scattering of light by a large conducting sphere (second paper). Proc. Lond. Math. Soc. 11, 277-284.
- Uniform rotation, the principle of relativity, and the Michelson-Morley experiment. Phil. Mag. 24, 820-827.
- Atomic models and X-ray spectra. Nature, Lond. 92, 583-584. (1914)
- The constitution of atoms and molecules. Nature, Lond. 93, 268-269. (1914)
- Sur les poids atomiques des elements des nebuleuses. C.R. Acad. Sci. Paris, 158, 1322-1323. (1914)
- The high frequency spectra of the elements and the structure of the atom. Phil. Mag. 27, 541-564.
- Atomic structure and the spectrum of helium. Phil. Mag. 28, 90-103. (With T. R. Merton.)
- On the distribution of intensity in broadened spectral lines Phil. Trans. A, 216, 459-488. (With T. R. Merton.)
- On intensity relations in the spectrum of helium. Phil. Trans. A, 220, 137-173.
