= IRAS 14394+5332 =

Galaxy in the constellation of Boötes

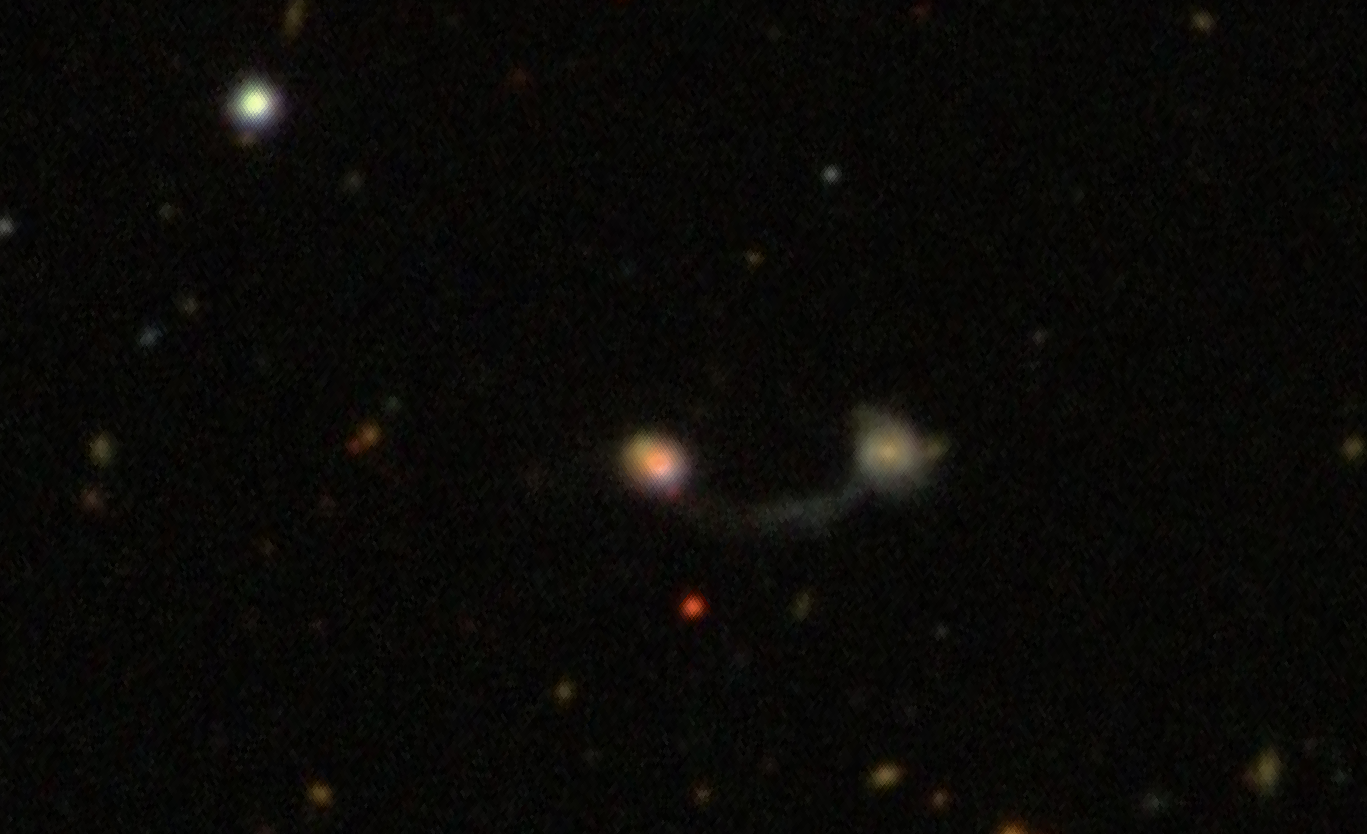
- SDSS image of IRAS 14394+5332. The galaxy on the right of the image is LEDA 2438180.

Observation data (J2000.0 epoch)
- Constellation: Boötes
- Right ascension: 14^{h} 41^{m} 04.42^{s}
- Declination: +53° 20′ 09.04″
- Redshift: 0.105024
- Heliocentric radial velocity: 31,485 km/s
- Distance: 1.410 Gly
- Apparent magnitude (V): 17.77

Characteristics
- Type: ULIRG Sy2
- Size: ~163,900 ly (50.26 kpc) (estimated)

Other designations
- 2MASX J14410437+5320088, LEDA 84264, IRAS F14394+5332, IRAS F14394+5332E, SDSS J144104.38+532008.6, AKARI J1441041+532010

IRAS 14394+5332 is an ultraluminous infrared galaxy and a galaxy merger located in the constellation of Boötes. It has a redshift of (z) 0.105, estimating the distance to be 1.4 billion light-years from Earth. The galaxy was first discovered by astronomers in 1996 who found it having a total infrared luminosity of 1.10×10^{12} L_{☉}. (Note: Given as a log(L_{IR}/L_{☉}) of 12.04.)

== Description ==
IRAS 14394+5332 is described as a triple interacting galaxy system consisting of a spiral galaxy located in western direction and a final-stage double nucleus galaxy merger located in the eastern direction with two closely spaced nuclei, only separating by 2.6 kiloparsecs from each other. A long tidal tail made up diffused radio emission is seen extending by 35 kiloparsecs between the galaxies.

The nucleus on the eastern side of the double nucleus galaxy in the IRAS 14394+5332 system, is found to be active. It is described as a Seyfert type 2 galaxy based on optical wavelength observations and is bright at near-infrared wavelengths compared to the faint western nucleus, with it displaying emission lines in its spectrum. Furthermore, the morphology of the double nucleus galaxy is complex according to Hubble Space Telescope optical imaging, who described it having two condensation components that seems to be divided by a dust lane. HST imaging also found the structure is irregular with the higher surface brightness feature centering more on the northern condensation component connected with the eastern nucleus.

Observations found the eastern nucleus of the galaxy has detections of nuclear outflows. Based on results, it shows a doubly ionized oxygen emission-line kinematic feature best described by three narrow components; mainly a redmost component and two other components described having blueshift measurements of –700 and –1360 kilometers per second. Data also showed these profiles of doubly ionized oxygen emission lines are noticed as different when compared to the other emission lines.

There are also evidence of ionized outflows in the eastern nucleus of the galaxy within a 0.75 ± 0.12 kiloparsec region, with a mass outflow rate of 3.4+13.8
−3.0 M_{☉} per year and a kinetic power measuring 0.66+3.12
−0.60 percent in energy levels. A total star formation rate of 2.26 ± 0.03 M_{☉} per year and a stellar mass of 10.50 ± 0.06 M_{☉} has been estimated for the system.
