= MS 0839.8+2938 BCG =

Type-cD galaxy in the constellation of Cancer

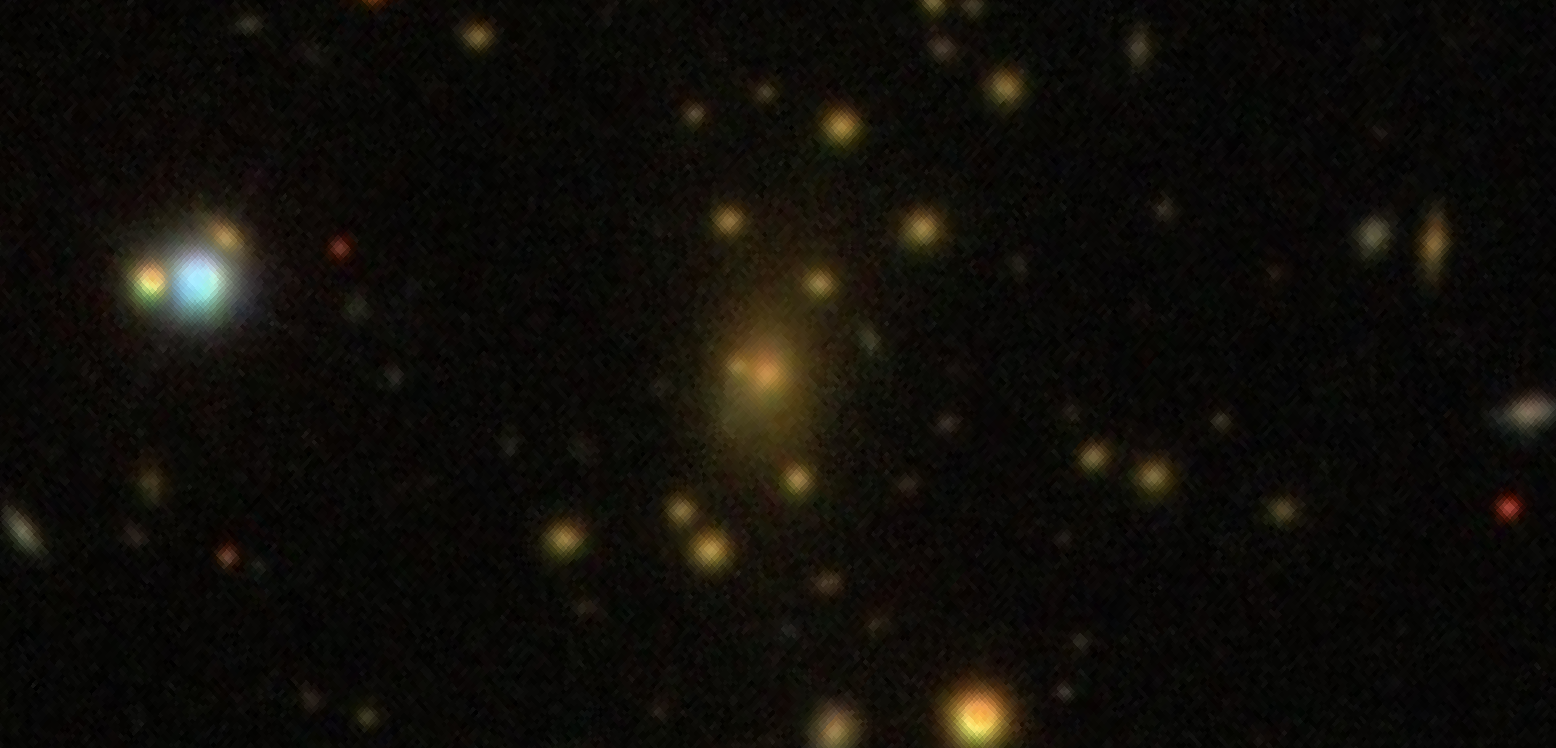
- SDSS image of MS 0839.8+2938 BCG

Observation data (J2000.0 epoch)
- Constellation: Cancer
- Right ascension: 08^{h} 42^{m} 55.97^{s}
- Declination: +29° 27′ 27.03″
- Redshift: 0.193663
- Heliocentric radial velocity: 58,059 ± 13 km/s
- Distance: 2,790.5 ± 195.3 Mly (855.57 ± 59.89 Mpc)
- Group or cluster: MS 0839.8+2938
- magnitude (J): 14.47

Characteristics
- Type: BrCIG
- Size: ~449,000 ly (137.6 kpc) (estimated)

Other designations
- 2MASX J08425596+2927272, OGC 0376, NVSS J084255+292727, LEDA 139129, RX J0842.9+2927, MS 0839.8+2938:[HDH2012] BCG, GALEX J084256.0+292728

MS 0839.8+2938 BCG (short for MS 0839.8+2938 Brightest Cluster Galaxy), is a Type-cD galaxy located in the constellation of Cancer. The redshift of the galaxy is (z) 0.193 and it was first discovered by astronomers in September 1989. It is the dominant and also the brightest cluster galaxy (BCG) of the galaxy cluster MS 0839.8+2938, known as 1E 0839.9+2938.

== Description ==
MS 0839.8+2938 BCG is categorized as a giant elliptical galaxy with an E2 Hubble classification. The color of the galaxy is blue, with the optical spectrum mainly displaying signatures of strong emission lines. There is a faint secondary nucleus located in the northeast with a position angle of 75°. The far-infrared star formation rate is estimated to be 4.1 ± 0.5 M_{☉}, with a continuous star formation rate of around 1.05 M_{☉} and a total stellar mass of around 40.7 × 10^{6} M_{☉}. The appearance of the BCG has been described as having disky isophotes. The K-band magnitude is estimated to be 13.42.

The nucleus of the BCG is active and contains a strong radio source, making it a radio galaxy. The source has a radio luminosity of 1.1 × 10^{24} W Hz^{−1} and has a compact appearance, mainly dominated by a radio core with radio lobes extending for 80 kiloparsecs. The measured radio flux density is estimated to be 26 ± 1 and 25 ± 1 mJy based on C and B configuration array imaging made by the Very Large Array (VLA). Radio imaging made with the Low Frequency Array (LOFAR) shows a central radio component with small lobes. There is no clear evidence of any X-ray cavities associated with the lobes. A study also found the BCG displays extended hydrogen alpha emission and also doubly ionized oxygen emission mainly centering on it, indicating signs of cooling flows.
