= OIII =

OIII (capital letter "O" followed by three capital "I"s) may refer to:

- Mehrabad International Airport, Tehran, Iran, ICAO designator
- OIII or O III, term for doubly ionized oxygen O^{++} in astronomy
