= Barry G. Clark =

American astronomer

Barry Gillespie Clark
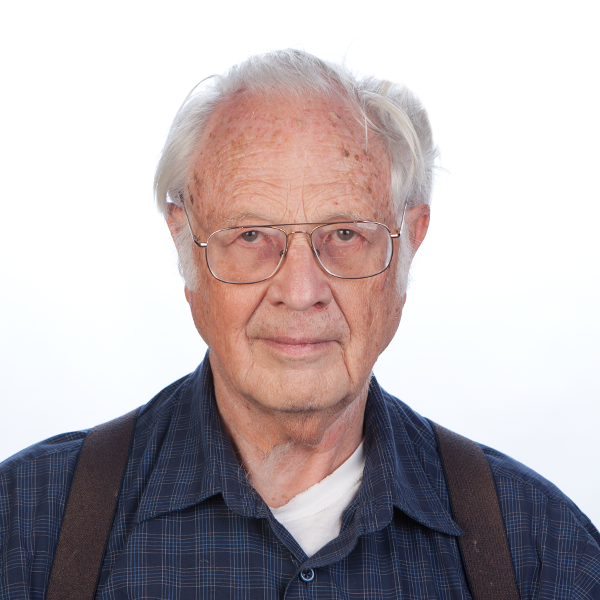
- Born: March 5, 1938 (age 88)
- Education: California Institute of Technology (BS, 1959) (Ph.D., 1964)
- Known for: Radio astronomy Interferometry
- Scientific career
- Fields: Radio astronomy
- Workplaces: National Radio Astronomy Observatory

Barry Gillespie Clark (born March 5, 1938) is an American astronomer who led the development of the world's first digitally recorded, software correlated Very Long Baseline Interferometry (VLBI) system for radio astronomy, the Green Bank Interferometer. He was also heavily involved in the development of the Very Large Array and the Very Long Baseline Array.

Clark earned a BS in 1959 and a PhD in 1964, both from Caltech. His entire working life has been spent at the National Radio Astronomy Observatory in Socorro, New Mexico, where he has worked from 1964-2004, and then from 2004 as Emeritus Scientist (until at least as late as October 2013).

Kenneth Kellermann and Marshall Cohen (fellow NRAO scientists) in a 1988 paper, "The origin and evolution of the N.R.A.O.-Cornell VLBI system" discuss much of the work at NRAO on the development of VLBI systems, going from baselines of 200 km to intercontinental baselines, and involving several international collaborations including a collaboration with the USSR.

He was elected in 1966 a fellow of the American Association for the Advancement of Science. He is a fellow of the American Astronomical Society (AAS).

== Honors and awards ==
- 1971 Rumford Prize (together with Canadian and other NRAO collaborators)
- 1991 George Van Biesbroeck Prize
- 2009 Grote Reber Medal (for significant and innovative contributions to radio astronomy).

== Publications ==
- Clark, B.G. (1973). "The NRAO tape-recorder interferometer system". Proceedings of the IEEE. 61 (9): 1242–1248. Bibcode:1973IEEEP..61.1242C. doi:10.1109/PROC.1973.9253.
- Bare, C.; Clark, B.G.; Kellermann, K.I.; Cohen, M.H.; Jauncey, D.L. (1967). "Interferometer Experiment with Independent Local Oscillators". Science. 157 (3785): 189–91. Bibcode:1967Sci...157..189B. doi:10.1126/science.157.3785.189. PMID 17806263. S2CID 29388828.
- Clark, B.G. (1965). "An Interferometer Investigation of the 21-CENTIMETER Hydrogen-Line Absorption". Astrophysical Journal. 142: 1398. Bibcode:1965ApJ...142.1398C. doi:10.1086/148426.
- Kellermann, K.I., Clark, B.G., Bare, C.C., Rydbeck, O., Ellder, J., Hansson, B. (1968). "High-Resolution Interferometry of Small Radio Sources Using Intercontinental Base Lines". Astrophysical Journal. 153: L209. Bibcode:1968ApJ...153L.209K. doi:10.1086/180253.
- Thompson, A.R., Clark, B.G., Wade, C.M., & Napier, P.J. (1980). "The Very Large Array". Astrophysical Journal Supplement Series. 44: 151–167. Bibcode:1980ApJS...44..151T. doi:10.1086/190688.
- Napier, P.J., Bagri D.S., Clark, B.G., Rogers A.E.E., Romney, J.D., Thompson, A.R. & Walker, R.C. (1994). "The Very Long Baseline Array". Proceedings of the IEEE. 82 (5): 658–672. Bibcode:1994IEEEP..82..658N. doi:10.1109/5.284733.
- Bare, C., Clark, B.G., Kellermann, K.I., Cohen, M.H. & Jauncey, D.L. (1967). "Interferometer Experiment with Independent Local Oscillators". Science. 157 (3785): 189–91. Bibcode:1967Sci...157..189B. doi:10.1126/science.157.3785.189. PMID 17806263. S2CID 29388828.
- Kellermann, K.I.; Clark, B.G., Bare, C.C., Rydbeck, O., Ellder, J., Hansson, B. (1968). "High-Resolution Interferometry of Small Radio Sources Using Intercontinental Base Lines". Astrophysical Journal. 153: L209. Bibcode:1968ApJ...153L.209K. doi:10.1086/180253.
