= SDSS J0841+0101 =

Seyfert 2 galaxy in the constellation Hydra

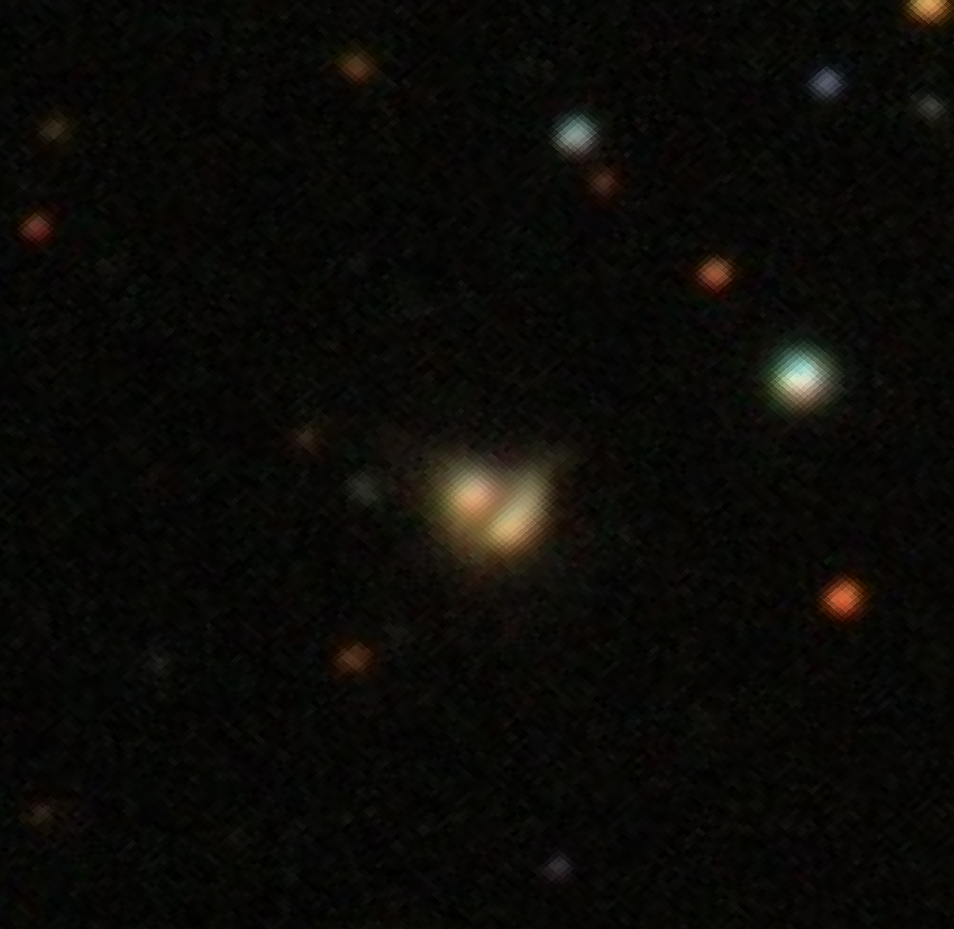
- The Seyfert 2 galaxy SDSS J0841+0101

Observation data (J2000.0 epoch)
- Constellation: Hydra
- Right ascension: 08^{h} 41^{m} 35.08^{s}
- Declination: +01° 01′ 55.89″
- Redshift: 0.110603
- Heliocentric radial velocity: 33,158 km/s ± 2
- Distance: 1.497 Gly
- Apparent magnitude (V): 18.22

Characteristics
- Type: QSO2
- Size: ~202,000 ly (61.9 kpc) (estimated)

Other designations
- GAMA 300666, LEDA 1182450, 2MASX J08413487+0101547, NVSS J084135+010156, SDSS J084135.04+010156.3, SDSS J0841+0101NE

SDSS J0841+0101 is a type 2 Seyfert galaxy located in the constellation of Hydra. The redshift of the galaxy is (z) 0.110 and it was first discovered in 2008 by astronomers conducting the Sloan Digital Sky Survey (SDSS) who classified it as a type 2 quasar. This object is known to contain two active galactic nuclei with an estimated separation of 7.6 kiloparsecs.

== Description ==
SDSS J0841+0101 is categorized as an elliptical galaxy. It is currently undergoing a galaxy merger with two doubly ionized oxygen components present in the same location as the stellar bulges of the two merging galaxies. One of the stellar bulges on the northeast part of the galaxy contains an active X-ray nucleus and it is much more massive when compared to the stellar bulge on the southwest part of the galaxy. There is also radio emission found as extended and positioned between the bulge components. This is suggested to originate through either ionized or photoionized gas during the merger process. Both of the nuclei are thought to be offset. The star formation of the galaxy is estimated to be around 2.9^{3.2}_{1.7} M_{☉} per year, with its stellar mass estimated as 10.60^{0.34}_{0.42} M_{☉}.

A study has found SDSS J0841+0101 is a radio-quiet quasar. It has a somewhat compact radio structure made up of three components. The radio core is resolved and it is mainly associated with the quasar nucleus. Between the galaxies, there is a bright radio knot feature that overlaps with the filamentary gas. An outer knot feature is shifted by two arcseconds relative to the position of the nucleus and overlapping together with the galaxy located on the north side of the system. This indicates either the radio lobe or even the hotspot.

There is also the presence of hydrogen-alpha emission in the galaxy. It is mainly detected towards the northeast direction until it reaches 21 kiloparsecs away from the quasar and also right up to around 14 kiloparsecs southwest of the other nucleus of the companion. This gas structures reminds as tidal features. In addition, there are radio knots tracing the path of the emission tail with the radio jet interacting with the interstellar medium. The galaxy also displays mass outflow rates of 24 M_{☉} yr^{−1}, with an outflow power of 3.7 × 10^{42} erg s^{−1}.
