= Bowen ratio =

Describes heat transfer for surfaces

The Bowen ratio is used to describe the type of heat transfer for a surface that has moisture. Heat transfer can either occur as sensible heat (differences in temperature without evapotranspiration) or latent heat (the energy required during a change of state, without a change in temperature). The Bowen ratio is generally used to calculate heat lost (or gained) in a substance; it is the ratio of sensible heat to latent heat (i.e., energy associated with changes of state), respectively. It is a unitless quantity.

The ratio was named by Harald Sverdrup after Ira Sprague Bowen (1898–1973), an astrophysicist whose theoretical work on evaporation to air from water bodies made first use of it, and it is used most commonly in meteorology and hydrology.

== Formulation ==
The Bowen ratio is calculated by the equation:

$B = {\frac{Q_h}{Q_e}}$, where $Q_h$ is sensible heating and $Q_e$ is latent heating.

In this context, when the magnitude of $B$ is less than one, a greater proportion of the available energy at the surface is passed to the atmosphere as latent heat than as sensible heat, and the converse is true for values of $B$ greater than one. As ${Q_e \rightarrow 0}$, however, $B$ becomes unbounded making the Bowen ratio a poor choice of variable for use in formulae, especially for arid surfaces. For this reason the evaporative fraction is sometimes a more appropriate choice of variable representing the relative contributions of the turbulent energy fluxes to the surface energy budget.

The Bowen ratio is related to the evaporative fraction, $EF$, through the equation,

$${EF = \frac{Q_e}{Q_e + Q_h} = \frac{1}{1+B}}$$.

=== Equilibrium Bowen Ratio ===
The equilibrium Bowen ratio is the Bowen ratio for when the surface and the air at a given reference level are both saturated. It is used in situations where evaporative cooling is not constrained by a lack of surface moisture, such as over large bodies of water. The equilibrium Bowen ratio is also inversely proportional to the saturation mixing ratio to the rate of change of the mixing ratio of water vapor with temperature. It is defined as:

$B_e=\frac{c_p}{L}(\frac{\partial q^*}{\partial T}|_{T=T_s})^{-1}$, where $c_p$ is the specific heat of dry air at constant pressure, $L$ is the latent heat of vaporization of water, $q^*$, is the saturation specific humidity, and $T$ is temperature. The partial derivative is evaluated at the surface temperature, $T=T_s$.

The equilibrium Bowen ratio is the maximum possible Bowen ratio for a wet surface. Since the air at a given level is usually not saturated, more evaporative cooling can occur, making it so the actual Bowen ratio is often smaller than the equilibrium Bowen ratio. If the surface is saturated, the actual Bowen ratio can be expressed in terms of the equilibrium Bowen ratio and specific humidity of the surface and at a given reference level:

$B=B_e(1-\frac{q_a^*-q_a}{q_s^*-q_a})$, where $q^*_a$ is the saturation specific humidity of the air at a given level near the surface, $q_a$is the specific humidity of the air, and $q_s^*$ is the saturation specific humidity of the surface.

== Measurement ==
British meteorologist Howard Penman developed an approximation of the Bowen ratio that could be calculated with a minimal amount of data. He found that:

$B\approx \frac{c_p(T_s-T_a)}{L(q_s-q_a)}$, where $c_p$ is the specific heat of dry air at constant pressure, $L$ is the latent heat of vaporization of water, $T_s$ is the temperature of the surface, $T_a$ is the temperature of the air above the surface, $q_s$ is the specific humidity of the surface, and $q_a$ is the specific humidity of air above the surface. This method is beneficial because Bowen ratio can be calculated with simple equipment, such as a wet-bulb and dry-bulb thermometer or a set of thermocouples.

== Applications ==
The Bowen ratio, B, is less than one over surfaces with abundant water supplies. It is negative where the sensible and latent heat fluxes are in opposite directions. Both fluxes are defined as positive when the flux is from the surface into the atmosphere. Sensible heat flux in the Arctic regions is often negative since air aloft is often warmer than the surface, which is due to poleward heat transport in the atmosphere.

| Type of surface | Range of Bowen ratios |
|---|---|
| Deserts | >10.0 |
| Semi-arid landscapes | 2.0-6.0 |
| Temperate forests and grasslands | 0.4-0.8 |
| Tropical rainforests | 0.1-0.3 |
| Tropical oceans | <0.1 |
