= Latent heat =

Thermodynamic phase transition energy

Latent heat (also known as latent energy or heat of transformation) is energy released or absorbed, by a body or a thermodynamic system, during a constant-temperature process—usually a first-order phase transition, like melting or condensation.

Latent heat can be understood as hidden energy which is supplied or extracted to change the state of a substance without changing its temperature or pressure. This includes the latent heat of fusion (solid to liquid), the latent heat of vaporization (liquid to gas) and the latent heat of sublimation (solid to gas).

The term was introduced around 1762 by Scottish chemist Joseph Black. Black used the term in the context of calorimetry where a heat transfer caused a volume change in a body while its temperature was constant.

In contrast to latent heat, sensible heat is energy transferred as heat, with a resultant temperature change in a body.

== Usage ==
Graph of temperature of phases of water heated from −100 °C to 200 °C – the dashed line example shows that melting and heating 1 kg of ice at −50 °C to water at 40 °C needs 600 kJ

The terms sensible heat and latent heat refer to energy transferred between a body and its surroundings, defined by the occurrence or non-occurrence of temperature change; they depend on the properties of the body. Sensible heat is sensed or felt in a process as a change in the body's temperature. Latent heat is energy transferred in a process without change of the body's temperature, for example, in a phase change (solid/liquid/gas).

Both sensible and latent heats are observed in many processes of transfer of energy in nature. Latent heat is associated with the change of phase of atmospheric or ocean water, vaporization, condensation, freezing or melting, whereas sensible heat is energy transferred that is evident in change of the temperature of the atmosphere or ocean, or ice, without those phase changes, though it is associated with changes of pressure and volume.

The original usage of the term, as introduced by Black, was applied to systems that were intentionally held at constant temperature. Such usage referred to latent heat of expansion and several other related latent heats. These latent heats are defined independently of the conceptual framework of thermodynamics.

When a body is heated at constant temperature by thermal radiation in a microwave field for example, it may expand by an amount described by its latent heat with respect to volume or latent heat of expansion, or increase its pressure by an amount described by its latent heat with respect to pressure.

Latent heat is energy released or absorbed by a body or a thermodynamic system during a constant-temperature process. Two common forms of latent heat are latent heat of fusion (melting) and latent heat of vaporization (boiling). These names describe the direction of energy flow when changing from one phase to the next: from solid to liquid, and liquid to gas.

In both cases the change is endothermic, meaning that the system absorbs energy. For example, when water evaporates, an input of energy is required for the water molecules to overcome the forces of attraction between them and make the transition from water to vapor.

If the vapor then condenses to a liquid on a surface, then the vapor's latent energy absorbed during evaporation is released as the liquid's sensible heat onto the surface.

The large value of the enthalpy of condensation of water vapor is the reason that steam is a far more effective heating medium than boiling water, and is more hazardous.

=== Meteorology ===
In meteorology, latent heat flux is the flux of energy from the Earth's surface to the atmosphere that is associated with evaporation or transpiration of water at the surface and subsequent condensation of water vapor in the troposphere. It is an important component of Earth's surface energy budget. Latent heat flux has been commonly measured with the Bowen ratio technique, or more recently since the mid-1900s by the eddy covariance method.

== History ==
=== Background ===
==== Evaporative cooling ====
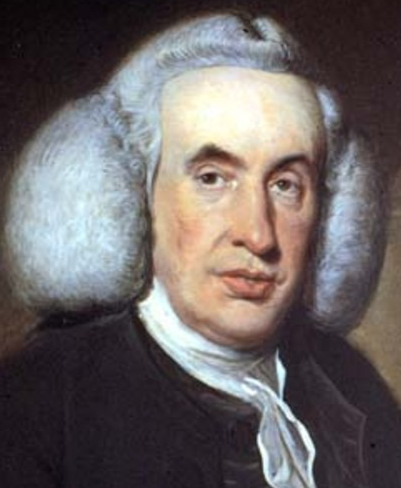
William Cullen

In 1748, an account was published in The Edinburgh Physical and Literary Essays of an experiment by the Scottish physician and chemist William Cullen. Cullen had used an air pump to lower the pressure in a container with diethyl ether. No heat was withdrawn from the ether, yet the ether boiled, but its temperature decreased. And in 1758, on a warm day in Cambridge, England, Benjamin Franklin and fellow scientist John Hadley experimented by continually wetting the ball of a mercury thermometer with ether and using bellows to evaporate the ether. With each subsequent evaporation, the thermometer read a lower temperature, eventually reaching 7 °F (−14 °C). Another thermometer showed that the room temperature was constant at 65 °F (18 °C). In his letter Cooling by Evaporation, Franklin noted that, "One may see the possibility of freezing a man to death on a warm summer's day."

=== Latent heat ===
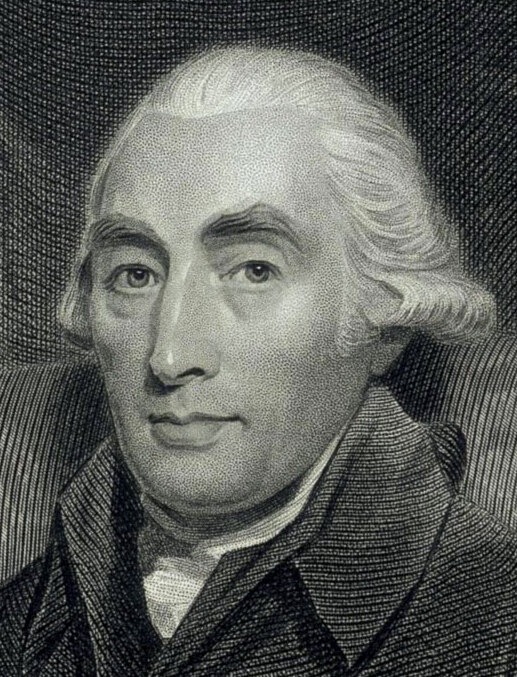
Joseph Black

The English word latent comes from Latin latēns, meaning lying hidden. The term latent heat was introduced into calorimetry around 1750 by Joseph Black, commissioned by producers of Scotch whisky in search of ideal quantities of fuel and water for their distilling process to study system changes, such as of volume and pressure, when the thermodynamic system was held at constant temperature in a thermal bath.

It was known that when the air temperature rises above freezing—air then becoming the obvious heat source—snow melts very slowly and the temperature of the melted snow is close to its freezing point. In 1757, Black started to investigate if heat, therefore, was required for the melting of a solid, independent of any rise in temperature. As far as Black knew, the general view at that time was that melting was inevitably accompanied by a small increase in temperature, and that no additional heat was needed beyond what this increase in temperature would require in itself. Soon, however, Black was able to show that much more heat was required during melting than could be explained by the increase in temperature alone. He was also able to show that heat is released by a liquid during its freezing; again, much more than could be explained by the decrease of its temperature alone.

Black would compare the change in temperature of two identical quantities of water, heated by identical means, one of which was, say, melted from ice, whereas the other was heated from merely cold liquid state. By comparing the resulting temperatures, he could conclude that, for instance, the temperature of the sample melted from ice was 140 °F lower than the other sample, thus melting the ice absorbed 140 "degrees of heat" that could not be measured by the thermometer, yet needed to be supplied, thus it was "latent" (hidden). Black also deduced that as much latent heat as was supplied into boiling the distillate (thus giving the quantity of fuel needed) also had to be absorbed to condense it again (thus giving the cooling water required).

==== Quantifying latent heat ====
In 1762, Black announced the following research and results to a society of professors at the University of Glasgow. Black had placed equal masses of ice at 32 °F (0 °C) and water at 33 °F (0.6 °C) respectively in two identical, well separated containers. The water and the ice were both evenly heated to 40 °F by the air in the room, which was at a constant 47 °F (8 °C). The water had therefore received 40 – 33 = 7 "degrees of heat". The ice had been heated for 21 times longer and had therefore received 7 × 21 = 147 "degrees of heat". (Note: These "degrees of heat" were context-dependent and could only be used when circumstances were identical—except for the one differing factor to be investigated. When Black investigated specific heat, the "degrees of heat" were based on change in temperature multiplied by mass. When Black investigated latent heat, they were based on change in temperature multiplied by time passed. Clearly these units were not equivalent.) The temperature of the ice had increased by 8 °F. The ice had thus absorbed 8 "degrees of heat", which Black called sensible heat, manifest as a temperature increase, which could be felt and measured. In addition to that, 147 – 8 = 139 "degrees of heat" were absorbed as latent heat, manifest as phase change rather than as temperature change.

Black next showed that a water temperature of 176 °F was needed to melt an equal mass of ice until it was all 32 °F. So now 176 – 32 = 144 "degrees of heat" seemed to be needed to melt the ice. The modern value for the heat of fusion of ice would be 143 "degrees of heat" on the same scale (79.5 "degrees of heat Celsius").

Finally, Black increased the temperature of a mass of water, then vaporized an equal mass of water by even heating. He showed that 830 "degrees of heat" was needed for the vaporization; again based on the time required. The modern value for the heat of vaporization of water would be 967 "degrees of heat" on the same scale.

=== James Prescott Joule ===
Later, James Prescott Joule characterised latent energy as the energy of interaction in a given configuration of particles, i.e. a form of potential energy, and the sensible heat as an energy that was indicated by the thermometer, relating the latter to thermal energy.

== Specific latent heat ==
A specific latent heat (L) expresses the amount of energy in the form of heat (Q) required to completely effect a phase change of a unit of mass (m), usually 1kg, of a substance as an intensive property:

$$L = \frac {Q}{m}.$$

Intensive properties are material characteristics and are not dependent on the size or extent of the sample. Commonly quoted and tabulated in the literature are the specific latent heat of fusion and the specific latent heat of vaporization for many substances.

From this definition, the latent heat for a given mass of a substance is calculated by

$$Q = {m}  {L}$$

where:

Q is the amount of energy released or absorbed during the change of phase of the substance (in kJ or in BTU),
m is the mass of the substance (in kg or in lb), and
L is the specific latent heat for a particular substance (in kJ kg^{−1} or in BTU lb^{−1}), either L_{f} for fusion, or L_{v} for vaporization.

== Table of specific latent heats ==
The following table shows the specific latent heats and change of phase temperatures (at standard pressure) of some common fluids and gases.

Substance	SLH of fusion (kJ/kg)	Melting point (°C)	SLH of vaporization (kJ/kg)	Boiling point (°C)	Boiling point (K)	SLH of Sublimation (kJ/kg)
Ethyl alcohol	108	−114	855	78.3	351.45	
Ammonia	332.17	−77.74	1369	−33.34	239.81	
Carbon dioxide	184	−78	574	−78.46	194.69	570
Helium			21	−268.93	4.22	
Hydrogen(2)	58	−259	455	−253	20.15	
Lead	23.0	327.5	871	1750	2023.15	
Methane	59	−182.6	511	−161.6	111.55	
Nitrogen	25.7	−210	200	−196	77.15	
Oxygen	13.9	−219	213	−183	90.15	
Refrigerant R134a		−101	215.9	−26.6	246.55	
Refrigerant R152a		−116	326.5	−25	248.15	
Silicon	1790	1414	12800	3265	3538.15	
Toluene	72.1	−93	351	110.6	383.75	
Turpentine			293	154	427.15	
Formic Acid	275.46	8.35	1010	100.75	373.9	1300
Water	334	0	2264.705	100	373.15	2840

== Specific latent heat for condensation of water in clouds ==
The specific latent heat of condensation of water in the temperature range from −25 °C to 40 °C is approximated by the following empirical cubic function:

$L_\text{water}(T) \approx \left(2500.8 - 2.36 T + 0.0016 T^2 - 0.00006 T^3\right)~\text{J/g},$

where the temperature $T$ is taken to be the numerical value in °C.

For sublimation and deposition from and into ice, the specific latent heat is almost constant in the temperature range from −40 °C to 0 °C and can be approximated by the following empirical quadratic function:

$L_\text{ice}(T) \approx \left(2834.1 - 0.29 T - 0.004 T^2\right)~\text{J/g}.$

== Variation with temperature (or pressure) ==
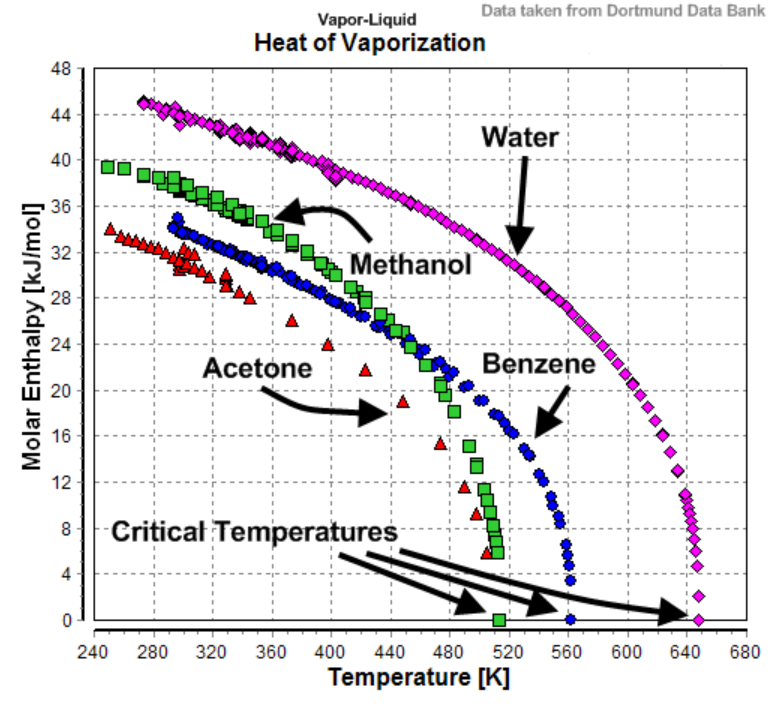
Temperature-dependency of the heats of vaporization for water, methanol, benzene, and acetone.

As the temperature (or pressure) rises to the critical point, the latent heat of vaporization falls to zero.

== See also ==
- Bowen ratio
- Eddy covariance flux (eddy correlation, eddy flux)
- Sublimation (physics)
- Specific heat capacity
- Enthalpy of fusion
- Enthalpy of vaporization
- Ton of refrigeration – the power required to freeze or melt 2000 lb of water in 24 hours
