= Kenneth Kellermann =

American astronomer

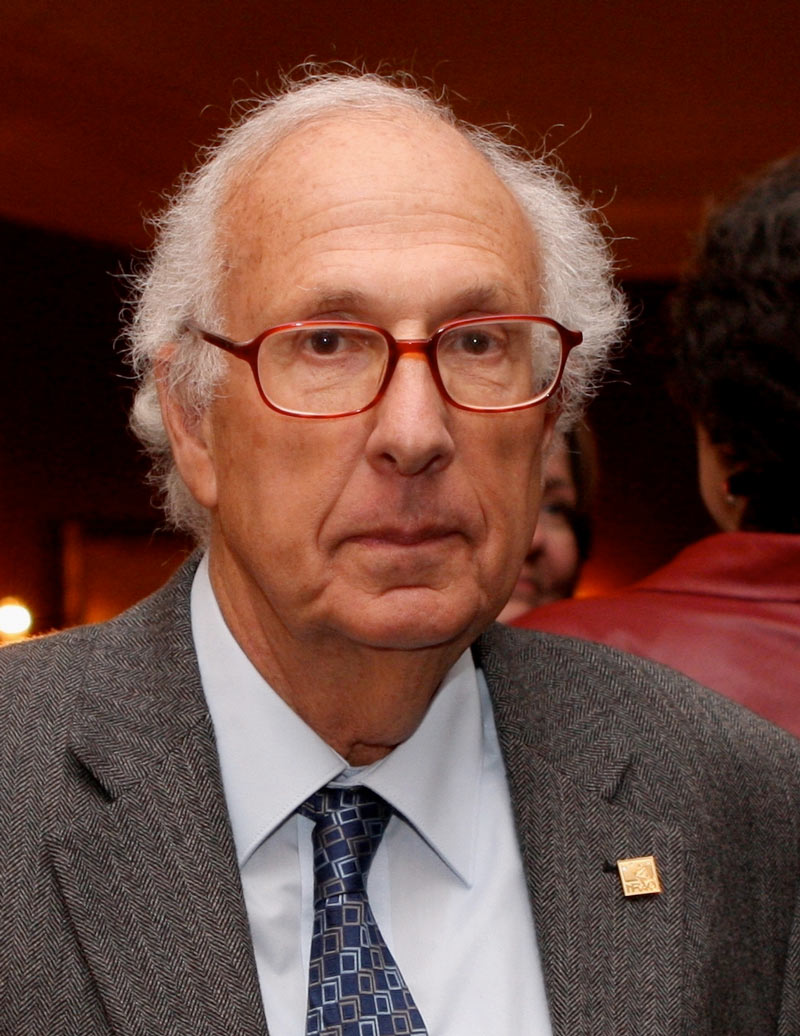
Kenneth Kellerman

Kenneth Irwin Kellermann (born July 1, 1937) is an American astronomer at the National Radio Astronomy Observatory. He is best known for his work on quasars. He won the Helen B. Warner Prize for Astronomy of the American Astronomical Society in 1971, and the Bruce Medal of the Astronomical Society of the Pacific in 2014.

Kellerman was a member of the National Academy of Sciences, the American Academy of Arts and Sciences, and the American Philosophical Society.

Kellermann was born in New York City to Alexander Kellermann and Rae Kellermann (née Goodstein). His paternal grandparents emigrated from Hungary and his maternal grandparents from Romania.

== Publications ==
- Kellermann, K. I. (2014). "The Road to Quasars". Proceedings of the International Astronomical Union. 10: 190–195. arXiv:1412.7867. doi:10.1017/S1743921315002185. S2CID 118625572.
- Kellermann, K. I. (2014). "Radio evidence for AGN activity: Relativistic jets as tracers of SMBHS". Proceedings of the International Astronomical Union. 10: 3–12. arXiv:1412.7866. doi:10.1017/S1743921315007383. S2CID 117013940.
- Kellermann, K. I. (2013). "The Discovery of Quasars". Bulletin of the Astronomical Society of India. 41 (1): 1. arXiv:1304.3627. Bibcode:2013BASI...41....1K. Direct Link
- Kellermann, K. I. (2012). "Early Parkes Observations of Planets and Cosmic Radio Sources". arXiv:1210.0984 [astro-ph.IM].
- Kellermann, K. I.; Cordes, J. M.; Ekers, R. D.; Lazio, J.; Wilkinson, P. (2009). "The exploration of the unknown". Astro2010: The Astronomy and Astrophysics Decadal Survey. 2010: 154. arXiv:0912.4441. Bibcode:2009astro2010S.154K.
- Kellermann, K. I.; Fomalont, E. B.; Mainieri, V.; Padovani, P.; Rosati, P.; Shaver, P.; Tozzi, P.; Miller, N. (2008). "The VLA Survey of the Chandra Deep Field South: I. Overview of the Radio Data". The Astrophysical Journal Supplement Series. 179 (1): 71. arXiv:0806.0843. Bibcode:2008ApJS..179...71K. doi:10.1086/591055. S2CID 16000090.
- Kellermann, K. I.; Lister, M. L.; Homan, D. C.; Kovalev, Y. Y.; Kadler, M.; Cohen, M. C. (2009). "Kinematics of AGN and Quasar Jets". ASP Conf. Ser. 402 (2009): 173–178. arXiv:0803.1301. Bibcode:2009ASPC..402..173K.
- Kellermann, K. I.; Kovalev, Y. Y.; Lister, M. L.; Homan, D. C.; Kadler, M.; Cohen, M. H.; Ros, E.; Zensus, J. A.; Vermeulen, R. C.; Aller, M. F.; Aller, H. D. (2007). "Doppler Boosting, Superluminal Motion, and the Kinematics of AGN Jets". Astrophysics and Space Science. 311 (1–3): 231–239. arXiv:0708.3219. Bibcode:2007Ap&SS.311..231K. doi:10.1007/s10509-007-9622-5. S2CID 18756984.
- Kellermann, K. I.; Lister, M. L.; Homan, D. C.; Vermeulen, R. C.; Cohen, M. H.; Ros, E.; Kadler, M.; Zensus, J. A.; Kovalev, Y. Y. (2004). "Sub-milliarcsecond Imaging of Quasars and Active Galactic Nuclei III. Kinematics of Parsec-Scale Radio Jets". The Astrophysical Journal. 609 (2): 539. arXiv:astro-ph/0403320. Bibcode:2004ApJ...609..539K. doi:10.1086/421289. S2CID 33835906.
- Kellermann, K. I. (2003). "Variability, Brightness Temperature, Superluminal Motion, Doppler Boosting, and Related Issues". Radio Astronomy at the Fringe. 300: 185. arXiv:astro-ph/0304165. Bibcode:2003ASPC..300..185K.
- Kellermann, K. I.; Lister, M. L.; Homan, D. C.; Ros, E.; Zensus, J. A.; Cohen, M. H.; Russo, M.; Vermeulen, R. C. (2002). "Superluminal Motion and Relativistic Beaming in Blazar Jets". High Energy Blazar Astronomy. 299: 117. arXiv:astro-ph/0211398. Bibcode:2003ASPC..299..117K.
- Kellermann, K. I.; Richards, E. A. (1999). "The Nature of Microjansky Radio Sources and Implications for the Design of the Next Generation Very Sensitive Radio Telescopes". Perspectives on Radio Astronomy: Science with Large Antenna Arrays: 157. arXiv:astro-ph/9909083. Bibcode:2000pras.conf..157K.
- Kellermann, K. I.; Vermeulen, R. C.; Zensus, J. A.; Cohen, M. H. (1998). "Sub-milliarcsecond Imaging of Quasars and AGN". The Astronomical Journal. 115 (4): 1295. arXiv:astro-ph/9801010. Bibcode:1998AJ....115.1295K. doi:10.1086/300308. S2CID 119076424.
