= Nebulium =

Proposed element found in astronomical observation of a nebula

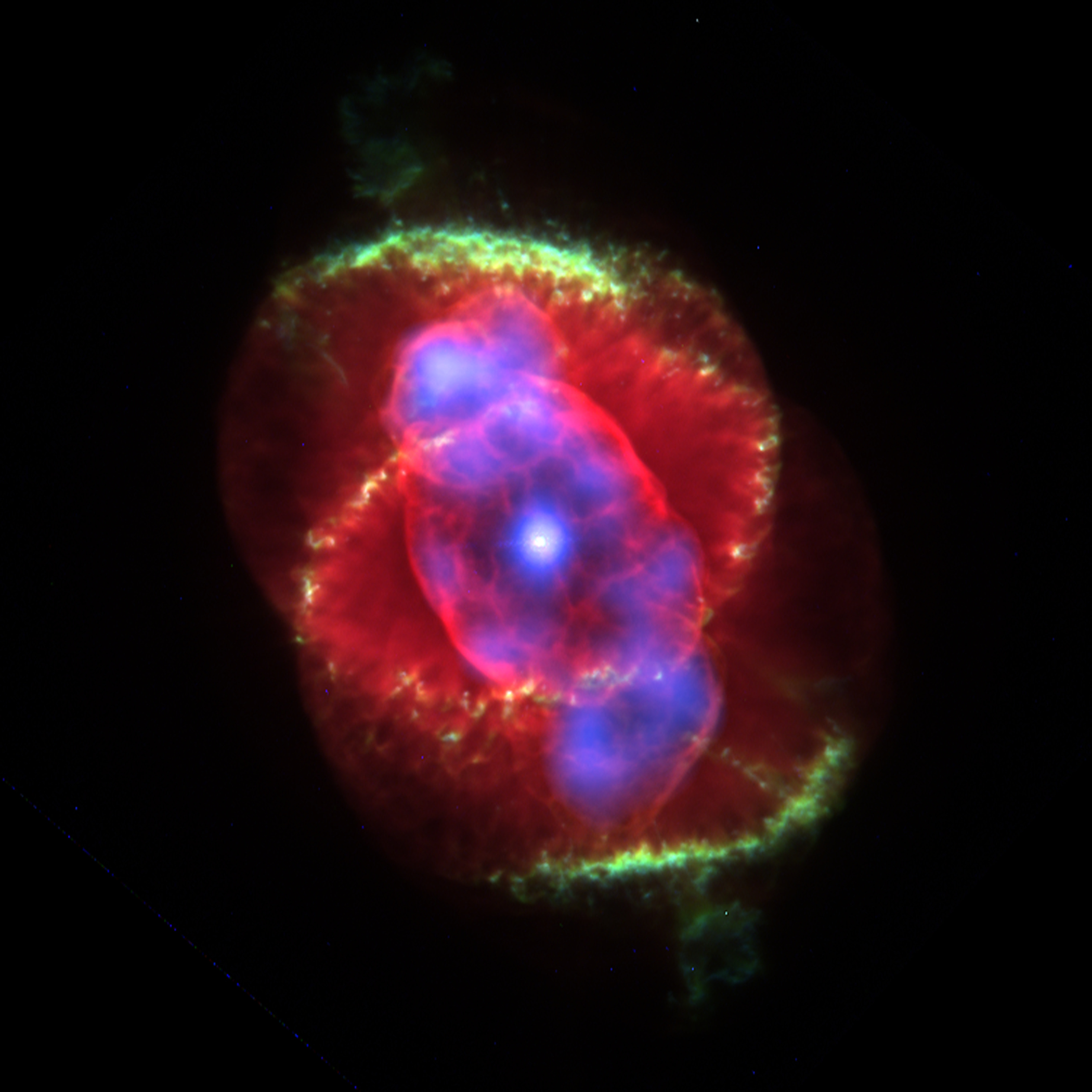
Cat's Eye Nebula (NGC 6543)

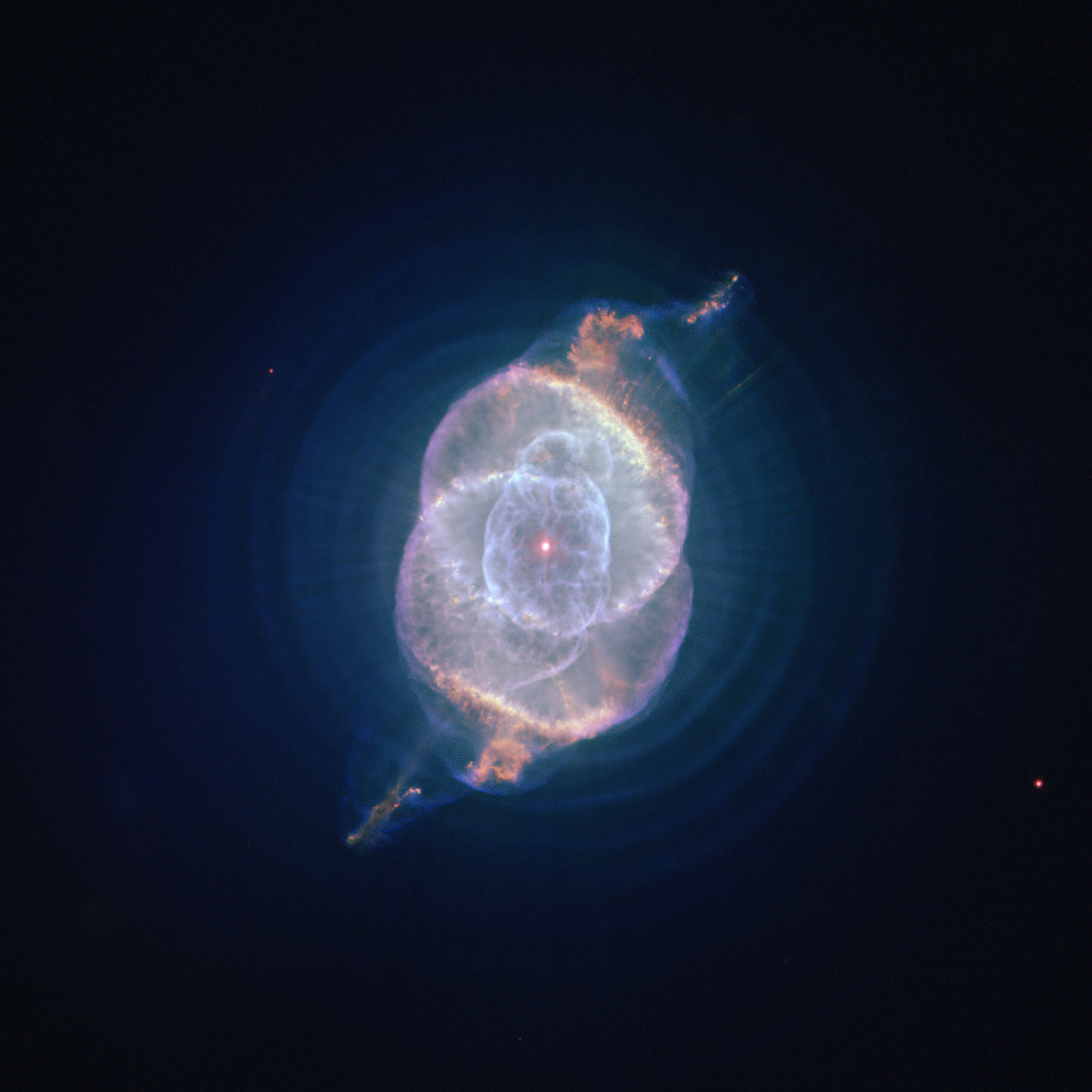
Cat's Eye Nebula (NGC 6543)

Nebulium was a proposed element found in astronomical observation of a nebula by William Huggins in 1864. The strong green emission lines of the Cat's Eye Nebula, discovered using spectroscopy, led to the postulation that an as yet unknown element was responsible for this emission. In 1927, Ira Sprague Bowen showed that the lines are emitted by doubly ionized oxygen (new style O^{2+}; old style O^{III}), and no new element was necessary to explain them.

== History ==
William Hyde Wollaston in 1802 and Joseph von Fraunhofer in 1814 described the dark lines within the solar spectrum. Later, Gustav Kirchhoff explained the lines by atomic absorption or emission, which allowed the lines to be used for the identification of chemical elements.

In the early days of telescopic astronomy, the word nebula was used to describe any fuzzy patch of light that did not look like a star. Many of these, such as the Andromeda Nebula, had spectra that looked like stellar spectra, and these turned out to be galaxies. Others, such as the Cat's Eye Nebula, had very different spectra. When William Huggins looked at the Cat's Eye, he found no continuous spectrum like that seen in the Sun, but just a few strong emission lines. The two green lines at 495.9 nm and 500.7 nm were the strongest. These lines did not correspond to any known elements on Earth. The fact that helium had been identified by the emission lines in the Sun in 1868, and had then also been found on Earth in 1895, encouraged astronomers to suggest that the lines were due to a new element. The name nebulium (occasionally nebulum or nephelium) was first mentioned by Margaret Lindsay Huggins in a short communication in 1898, although it is stated that her husband occasionally used the term before.

In 1911, John William Nicholson theorized that all known elements consisted of four protoelements, one of which was nebulium. The development of the periodic table by Dimitri Mendeleev and the determination of the atomic numbers by Henry Moseley in 1913 left nearly no room for a new element. In 1914 French astronomers were able to determine the atomic weight of nebulium. A measured value of 2.74 for the lines near 372 nm and a slightly lower value for the 500.7 nm line seemed to indicate that two elements were responsible for the spectrum.

Ira Sprague Bowen was working on UV spectroscopy and on the calculation of spectra of the light elements of the periodic table when he became aware of the green lines discovered by Huggins. With this knowledge he was able to suggest that the green lines might be forbidden transitions. They were shown as due to doubly ionized oxygen at extremely low density, rather than the hypothetical nebulium. As Henry Norris Russell put it, "Nebulium has vanished into thin air." Nebulae are typically extremely rarefied, much less dense than the hardest vacuums produced on Earth. In these conditions, lines can form which are suppressed at normal densities. These lines are known as forbidden lines, and are the strongest lines in most nebular spectra.

== See also ==
- Coronium
- Helium
