= Robert Hare (chemist) =

American chemist (1781-1858)

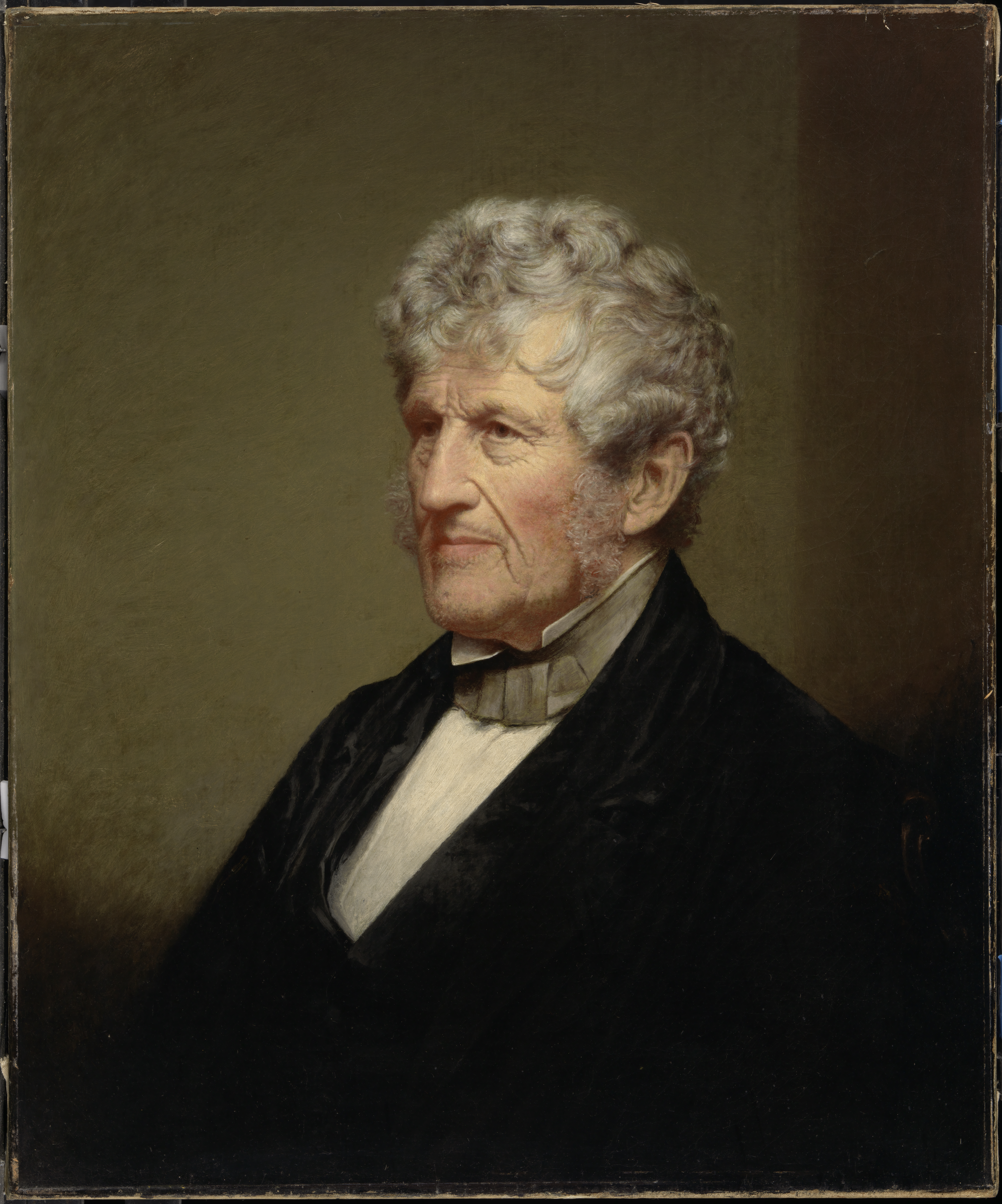
- 1856 portrait of Hare by Alvan Clark
- Born: January 17, 1781; Philadelphia, Pennsylvania
- Died: May 15, 1858 (aged 77); Philadelphia, Pennsylvania

Robert Hare (January 17, 1781 – May 15, 1858) was an early American chemist and professor.

== Biography ==
Hare was born in Philadelphia, Pennsylvania, on January 17, 1781. He developed and experimented with the oxy-hydrogen blowpipe, with Edward Daniel Clarke of Oxford, shortly after 1800. He married Harriett Clark and had six children. In 1802, Hare was elected a member of the American Philosophical Society. He was a professor at the University of Pennsylvania between 1810 and 1812 and between 1818 and 1847. By the 1820s, Hare had developed the "galvanic deflagrator", a type of voltaic battery having large plates used for producing rapid and powerful combustion. He was elected an Associate Fellow of the American Academy of Arts and Sciences in 1824.

Hare died in Philadelphia on May 15, 1858.

== Spiritualism ==
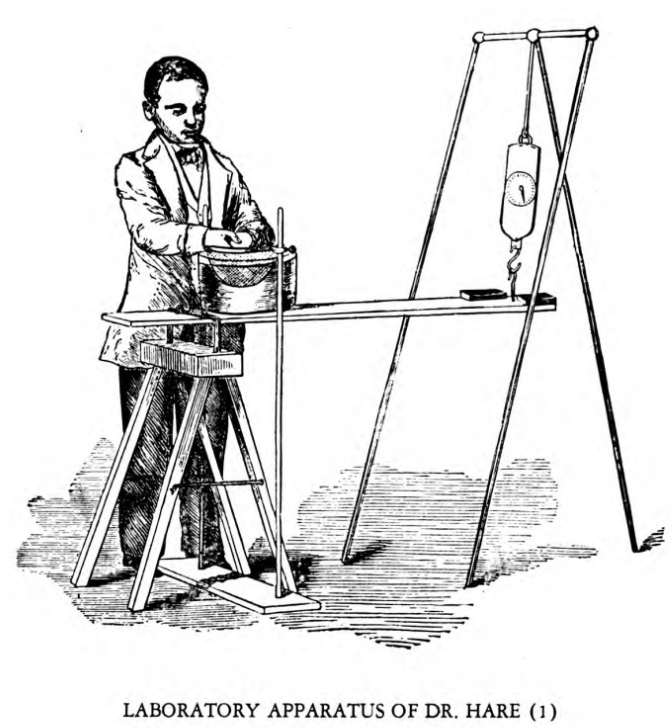
The apparatus that Hare used to test mediums

In 1853, Hare conducted experiments with mediums. A year later Hare had converted to Spiritualism and wrote several books that made him very famous in the United States as a Spiritualist. He published a book entitled Experimental Investigation of the Spirit Manifestations (1855). His work was criticized by scientists but was welcomed with enthusiasm by Spiritualists.

One of his experiments utilized a board and spring balance, the other involved the movement of a table at which a medium sat caused a pointer to indicate letters on a wheel. According to the psychical researcher Frank Podmore it would have been easy for the medium to move the table with their knees or other parts of the body but "Hare does not seem to have realized the possibility of fraud of this kind." Podmore also wrote that "the machinery, indeed, was not ill-devised, but its use did not dispense with the necessity for close and continuous observation of the human agent; and there is no evidence that Hare recognized this necessity, or took any steps to guard against trickery."

Science writer Terence Hines has written:

What of the scientists such as Hare and Wallace, who were convinced by what they saw at seances? Were they incompetent scientists, dupes, or just plain gullible? The answer is none of the above. They had simply ventured out of their own area of expertise—an often fatal mistake. They assumed, as did their critics in the scientific community, that if one is a good observer in the laboratory, one is also qualified to observe in the seance. This is simply not true. Mediums were known to cheat, using the magicians' tricks of sleight of hand and distraction. Magic is a skilled trade requiring years of experience and practice. The training of a chemist, physicist, or psychologist confers no ability to spot magicians' tricks. To detect such cheating requires a magician.

Historian Timothy Kneeland has argued that Hare's interest in Spiritualism was consistent with political and social beliefs that he held throughout his career. His book Experimental Investigation of the Spirit Manifestations (1855) promoted the restoration of social order based on principles of republicanism.

== Publications ==
Hare was a prolific writer, writing about hundred and fifty articles in the American Journal of Science. Among his other publications, there are:

- A Brief View of the Policy and Resources of the United States (1810);
- Chemical Apparatus and Manipulations (1836);
- Compendium of the Course of Chemical Instruction in the Medical Department of the University of Pennsylvania (1840);
- Memoir on the Explosiveness of Niter (1850);
- Experimental Investigation of the Spirit Manifestations (1855);
- Spiritualism Scientifically Demonstrated (1855).

Hare also wrote two novels:

- Standish the Puritan: A Tale of the American Revolution (1850)
- Overing: or, The heir of Wycherly. A Historical Romance (1852)
