= Ira Sprague Bowen =

American physicist and astronomer (1898–1973)

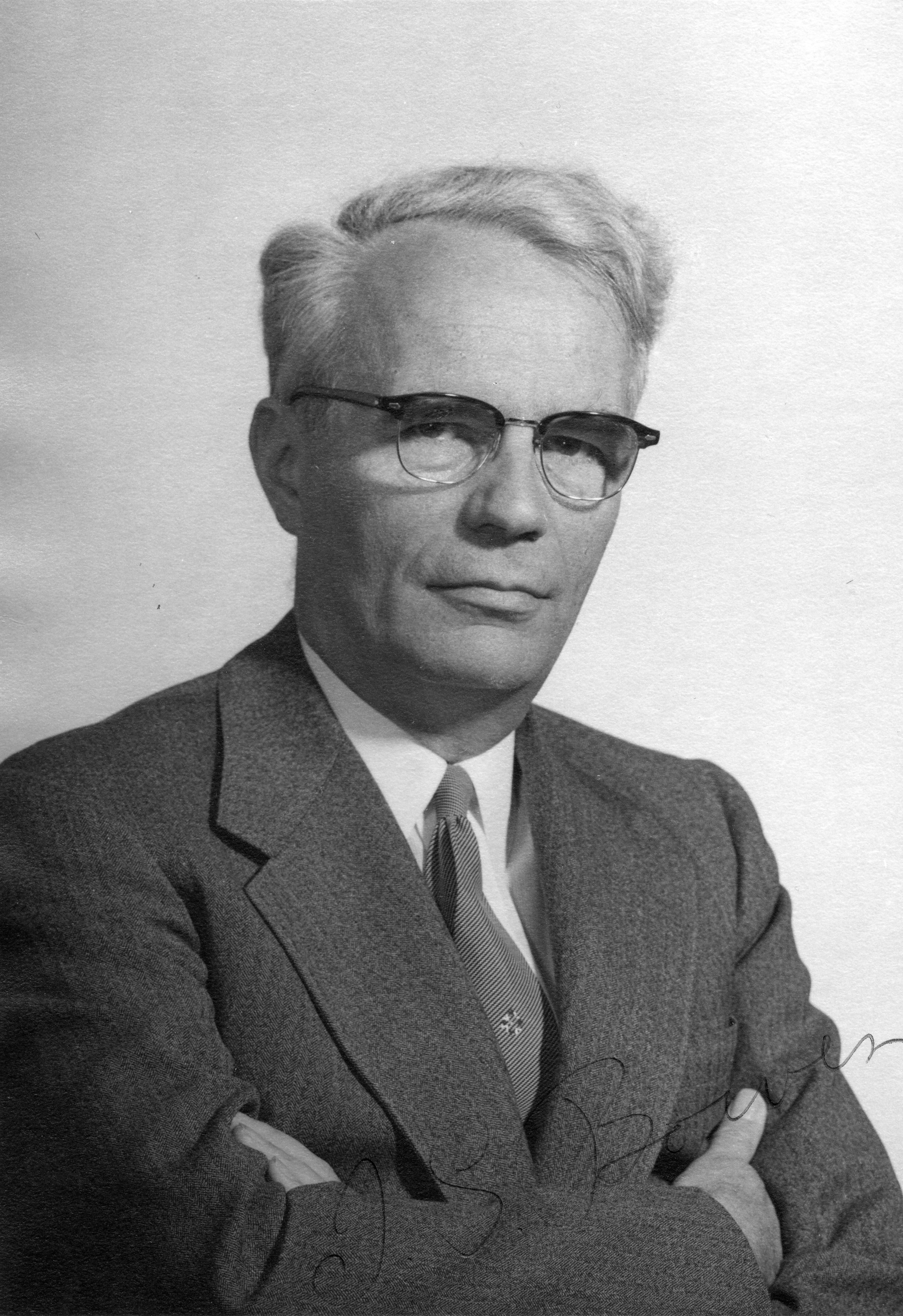
- Bowen in 1956
- Born: December 21, 1898; Seneca Falls, New York, United States
- Died: February 6, 1973 (aged 74)
- Education: California Institute of Technology
- Known for: Nebulium
- Awards: Henry Draper Medal (1942); Bruce Medal (1957)
- Scientific career
- Fields: astronomy
- Workplaces: Mount Wilson Observatory; Palomar Observatory

Ira Sprague Bowen (December 21, 1898 – February 6, 1973) was an American physicist and astronomer. In 1927 he discovered that nebulium was not really a chemical element but instead doubly ionized oxygen.

== Life and work ==
Bowen was born in Seneca Falls, New York in 1898 to Philinda Sprague and James Bowen. Due to frequent moves of his family he was home schooled until his father died in 1908. From that point on he attended Houghton College where his mother worked as teacher. After graduation from high school in 1915 Bowen stayed at the junior college of Houghton College, and later joined Oberlin College from which he graduated in 1919. During his time at Oberlin, Bowen did some research on the properties of steel for the scientist Robert Hadfield. Their results were published in 1921.

Bowen began studying physics at the University of Chicago in fall 1919. By 1921 he took a position in the research group of Robert Andrews Millikan. He was assigned to do ultraviolet spectroscopy of chemical elements. Millikan was persuaded by George Ellery Hale to move to the California Institute of Technology in 1921 and Bowen moved with him. The contact with Hale enabled Bowen also to work at the Mount Wilson Observatory and the Palomar Observatory. Bowen gave lectures on general physics at Caltech and did research on cosmic rays and followed his studies on UV spectroscopy. He also did calculations on spectra for the light elements of the periodic table. With that data and the inspiration from a chapter on gaseous nebula and the emission of radiation at low density in the book Astronomy by Henry Norris Russell, Raymond Smith Dugan and John Quincy Stewart he achieved his best known discovery.

The green emission lines of the Cat's Eye Nebula at 4959 and 5007 Ångström were discovered by William Huggins in 1864. Because no known element was showing these emission lines in the experiment it was concluded in the late 1890s that a new element was responsible for that lines, it was called nebulium. Bowen was able to calculate the forbidden transitions of doubly ionized oxygen to be exactly where the lines had been found. The low probability for collisions in the nebula made it impossible for the oxygen to get from the excited stated to the ground state and so the forbidden transitions were the main path for the relaxation. Bowen published his findings in 1927 and concluded that nebulium was not really a chemical element.

Bowen was the first director of the Palomar Observatory, serving from 1948 to 1964.

Before his retirement in 1964 and even afterwards Bowen was involved in the improvement of the optical design of several large optical instruments, for example the 100 inch Irenee duPont at the Las Campanas Observatory.

He is also known in the context of meteorology for the introduction of the Bowen ratio, which quantifies the ratio of sensible to latent heat over an evaporating surface.

== Honors ==
Ira Sprague Bowen was elected to the U.S. National Academy of Sciences in 1936, the American Philosophical Society in 1940, and the American Academy of Arts and Sciences in 1950.

Awards

- Henry Draper Medal from the National Academy of Sciences (1942)
- Howard N. Potts Medal (1946)
- Rumford Prize of the American Academy of Arts and Sciences (1949)
- Frederic Ives Medal (1952)
- Bruce Medal (1957)
- Henry Norris Russell Lectureship (1964)
- Gold Medal of the Royal Astronomical Society (1966)

Named after him

- The crater Bowen on the Moon
- Asteroid 3363 Bowen
- Bowen ratio of turbulent fluxes from a surface
