= Doubly ionized oxygen =

Oxygen ion in astronomy and atomic physics

A Grotrian diagram of doubly ionized oxygen: forbidden transitions in the visible spectrum are shown in green.

In astronomy and atomic physics, doubly ionized oxygen is the ion O^{2+} (O III in spectroscopic notation).

== Ion ==
Its emission of forbidden lines in the visible spectrum fall primarily at the wavelength 500.7 nm, and secondarily at 495.9 nm. Concentrated levels of O III are found in emission and planetary nebulae. Consequently, narrow band-pass filters that isolate the 500.7 nm and 495.9 nm wavelengths of light, that correspond to green-turquoise-cyan spectral colors, are useful in observing these objects, causing them to appear at higher contrast against the filtered and consequently blacker background of space (and possibly light-polluted terrestrial atmosphere) where the frequencies of [O III] are much less pronounced.

These emission lines were first discovered in the spectra of planetary nebulae in the 1860s. At that time, they were thought to be due to a new chemical element which was named nebulium. In 1927, Ira Sprague Bowen published the current explanation identifying their source as doubly ionized oxygen.

Other transitions include the forbidden 88.4 μm and 51.8 μm transitions in the far infrared region.

Permitted lines of O III lie in the middle ultraviolet band and are hence inaccessible to terrestrial astronomy.

== See also ==
- H II region
- Emission nebula
