= List of medicine awards =

Obverse of the Nobel Prize in Physiology or Medicine

This list of medicine awards is an index to articles about notable awards for contributions to medicine, the science and practice of establishing the diagnosis, prognosis, treatment, and prevention of disease. The list is organized by region and country of the organization giving the award, but the awards may be available to people from around the world.

== International ==
Country	Award	Sponsor	Notes
International	Edison Award	Edison Awards	Honoring excellence in innovation
International	Edwin Grant Conklin Medal	Society for Developmental Biology	Distinguished and sustained research in developmental biology
International	Gonin Medal	International Council of Ophthalmology	Ophthalmologist
International	Medtop Award	Medtop Award	The international award for outstanding healthcare members

== Americas ==
Country	Award	Sponsor	Notes
Canada	McLaughlin Medal	Royal Society of Canada	Important research of sustained excellence in any branch of medical sciences
Canada	CNIB Chanchlani Global Vision Research Award	Vasu Chanchlani, CNIB Foundation	Vital world-class research to explore the causes of blindness and vision loss, as well as potential cures, treatments and preventions
Canada	Canada Gairdner International Award	Gairdner Foundation	Outstanding discoveries or contributions to medical science
Canada	Canada Gairdner Wightman Award	Gairdner Foundation	Canadian who has demonstrated outstanding leadership in the field of medicine and medical science
Canada	Chanchlani Global Health Research Award	McMaster University	World leading scholar in the area of Global Health
Canada	Izaak Walton Killam Memorial Prize	Canada Council	Eminent Canadian researchers who distinguish themselves in the fields of social, human, natural, or health sciences
Canada	J. Allyn Taylor International Prize in Medicine	Robarts Research Institute	Individuals who have made significant contributions to a field of basic or clinical research in one of the Institute's principal areas of research
Canada	Léo-Pariseau Prize	Association francophone pour le savoir	Distinguished individual working in the field of biological or health sciences
Canada	Marcel-Piché Prize	Institut de recherches cliniques de Montréal	Researcher at the IRCM in recognition of the quality of [biomedical] research and the contribution to the growth and outreach of the Institute
Canada	Robert L. Noble Prize	Canadian Cancer Society	Researchers whose contributions have led to a significant advance in cancer research
Canada	The Louis and Artur Lucian Award in Cardiovascular Diseases	McGill University	Cardiovascular medicine
Chile	National Prize for Medicine	Chilean Academy of Medicine etc.	Doctors who have excelled among their peers in the area of clinical or public health and, in addition, have had a prominent role in teaching, academic administration, or research
Chile	National Prize for Natural Sciences (Chile)	National Prize of Chile	Natural sciences
United States / United Kingdom	Donald Mackay Medal	Royal Society of Tropical Medicine and Hygiene and American Society of Tropical Medicine and Hygiene	Outstanding work in tropical health, especially relating to improvements in the health of rural or urban workers in the tropics
United States	AAMC Award for Excellence in Medical Education (previously called Abraham Flexner Award)	Association of American Medical Colleges	teams or individuals whose work have had a profound impact on medical education
United States	AMA Scientific Achievement Award	American Medical Association	Physicians or non-physician scientists who have contributed significantly to the field of medical science
United States	APUA Leadership Award	Alliance for the Prudent Use of Antibiotics	Outstanding global contributions and commitment to preserve the power of antibiotics
United States	ASCB Public Service Award	American Society for Cell Biology	National leadership in support of biomedical research
United States	Albany Medical Center Prize	Albany Medical Center	Physician or scientist, or group, whose work has led to significant advances in the fields of health care and scientific research with demonstrated translational benefits applied to improved patient care
United States	Albert B. Sabin Gold Medal	Sabin Vaccine Institute	Work in the field of vaccinology or a complementary field
United States	Albert Lasker Award for Basic Medical Research	Lasker Foundation	Outstanding discovery, Contribution and achievement in the field of medicine and Human Physiology
United States	Alfred P. Sloan Jr. Prize	General Motors Cancer Research Foundation	Outstanding oncological research. No longer awarded
United States	American Association of Immunologists Lifetime Achievement Award	American Association of Immunologists	Lifetime achievement in immunology
United States	Archon X Prize	X Prize Foundation	First team to rapidly, accurately and economically sequence 100 whole human genomes to an unprecedented level of accuracy
United States	Breakthrough Prize in Life Sciences	Sergey Brin, Anne Wojcicki, Mark Zuckerberg etc.	Research aimed at curing intractable diseases and extending human life
United States	Bristol-Myers Squibb Awards	Bristol-Meyers Squibb Foundation	Distinguished achievements in fields such as cancer, infectious disease, neuroscience, nutrition, and cardiovascular disease
United States	Charles S. Mott Prize	General Motors Cancer Research Foundation	Outstanding recent contribution related to the cause or prevention of cancer. No longer awarded
United States	Cherokee Inspired Comfort Award	Cherokee Uniforms	Nurses and other non-physician, clinical, health care professionals who work directly with patients in the United States
United States	Clinical and Translational Science Award	National Center for Advancing Translational Sciences	Researchers and research teams working to apply new knowledge and techniques to patient care
United States	David Rall Medal	National Academy of Medicine	Distinguished leadership as chair of a study committee or other such activity, showing commitment above and beyond the usual responsibilities of the position
United States	Dickson Prize	University of Pittsburgh	US citizens who have made significant, progressive contributions to medicine
United States	Dr. Paul Janssen Award for Biomedical Research	Johnson & Johnson	Individual who has made a significant, transformational contribution toward the improvement of human health
United States	E. Mead Johnson Award	Society for Pediatric Research	Clinical and laboratory research achievements in pediatrics
United States	E.B. Wilson Medal	American Society for Cell Biology	Significant and far-reaching contributions to cell biology over the course of a career
United States	Elizabeth Blackwell Medal	American Medical Women's Association	Woman physician who has made the most outstanding contributions to the cause of women in the field of medicine
United States	Gabbay Award	Jacob and Louise Gabbay Foundation / Brandeis University	Outstanding work in the biomedical sciences
United States	Gorgas Medal	Association of Military Surgeons of the United States	Contributions to the eradication, control and/or prevention of disease, etc.
United States	Gruber Prize in Neuroscience	Gruber Foundation	Discoveries that have advanced the understanding of the nervous system
United States	Halbert L. Dunn Award	National Association for Public Health Statistics and Information Systems	Outstanding and lasting contributions to the field of vital and health statistics at the national, state, or local level
United States	Hilary Koprowski Prize in Neurovirology	Drexel University	Neurovirology
United States	Jessie Stevenson Kovalenko Medal	National Academy of Sciences	Important contributions to the medical sciences
United States	John Howland Award	American Pediatric Society	Distinguished service to pediatrics as a whole
United States	Karl Landsteiner Memorial Award	AABB	Scientists with an international reputation in transfusion medicine or cellular therapies whose original research resulted in an important contribution to the body of scientific knowledge
United States	Kelly West Award	American Diabetes Association	Individual who has made significant contributions to the field of diabetes epidemiology
United States	Kettering Prize	General Motors Cancer Research Foundation	Outstanding recent contribution to the diagnosis or treatment of cancer. No longer awarded
United States	Komen Brinker Award for Scientific Distinction	Susan G. Komen for the Cure	Significant work in advancing research concepts or clinical application in the fields of breast cancer research, screening or treatment
United States	Lasker Award	Lasker Foundation	Living persons who have made major contributions to medical science or who have performed public service on behalf of medicine
United States	Lasker-Bloomberg Public Service Award	Lasker Foundation	Individual or organization whose public service has profoundly enlarged the possibilities for medical research and the health sciences and their impact on the health of the public
United States	Lasker-DeBakey Clinical Medical Research Award	Lasker Foundation	Outstanding work for the understanding, diagnosis, prevention, treatment, and cure of disease
United States	Lasker-Koshland Special Achievement Award in Medical Science	Lasker Foundation	Special achievement in medical science
United States	Library of Congress Living Legend	Library of Congress	Creative contributions to American life
United States	Louisa Gross Horwitz Prize	Columbia University	Outstanding contribution in basic research in the fields of biology or biochemistry
United States	Lurie Prize in Biomedical Sciences	Foundation for the National Institutes of Health	Outstanding achievement by a promising young scientist in biomedical research
United States	Lydia's Professional Uniforms and AACN Nursing Scholarship	Uniform Advantage / American Association of Colleges of Nursing	Deserving nursing students enrolled in master's and doctoral programs
United States	March of Dimes Prize in Developmental Biology	March of Dimes	Investigator whose research brings us closer to the day when all babies will be born healthy
United States	Massry Prize	Meira and Shaul G. Massry Foundation	Scientists who have made substantial recent contributions in the biomedical sciences
United States	Maxwell Finland Award	National Foundation for Infectious Diseases	Outstanding contributions to the understanding of infectious diseases or public health
United States	Medical Director of the Year Award	AMDA – The Society for Post-Acute and Long-Term Care Medicine	Medical directors with exceptional leadership and commitment to quality patient care
United States	Methuselah Mouse Prize	Methuselah Foundation	Research team that broke the world record for the oldest-ever mouse / Team that developed the most successful late-onset rejuvenation strategy
United States	Metlife Foundation Award for Medical Research in Alzheimer's Disease	MetLife / American Federation for Aging Research	Scientific contributions toward a better understanding of the underlying causes, prevention, and treatments of Alzheimer's disease
United States	National Institutes of Health Director's Pioneer Award	National Institutes of Health	Pioneering research that is highly innovative and has a potential to produce paradigm shifting results
United States	Nemmers Prize in Medical Science	Northwestern University	Awarded to a physician-scientist whose body of research exhibits outstanding achievement in medical science as demonstrated by works of lasting significance
United States	Palo Alto Longevity Prize	Joon Yun	Encourage teams from all over the world to compete in an all-out effort to "hack the code" that regulates our health and lifespan
United States	Paul Marks Prize for Cancer Research	Memorial Sloan Kettering Cancer Center	Cancer researchers who are making significant contributions to the understanding of cancer or are improving the treatment of the disease through basic or clinical research
United States	Pollin Prize for Pediatric Research	NewYork-Presbyterian Hospital	Important advances to the field of pediatrics. No longer awarded
United States	Potamkin Prize	American Academy of Neurology	Achievements on emerging areas of research in Pick's disease, Alzheimer's disease and other dementias
United States	Quilligan Scholars	Society for Maternal-Fetal Medicine	Promising residents in Obstetrics and gynaecology who exhibit unparalleled potential to become future leaders in the field of Perinatology
United States	Rema Lapouse Award	American Public Health Association	Significant contributions to the scientific understanding of the epidemiology and control of mental disorders
United States	Remington Medal	American Pharmacists Association	Distinguished service on behalf of American pharmacy
United States	Rob Sias Award	University of Minnesota	Excellence in clinical dermatology
United States	Pasarow Foundation Medical Research Award	Pasarow Foundation	Distinguished accomplishment in areas of investigation that included neuropsychiatry, cardiovascular disease, and cancer research (to 2013)
United States	Rosenstiel Award	Brandeis University	Recent discoveries of particular originality and importance to basic medical research
United States	Sarnat Prize	National Academy of Medicine	Outstanding achievement in improving mental health
United States	Sarnoff Fellowship	Sarnoff Fellowship	Medical students interested in cardiovascular research
United States	Schottenstein Prize in Cardiovascular Sciences	Ohio State University Wexner Medical Center	extraordinary and sustained contributions to improving cardiovascular health
United States	Sheila Essey Award	American Academy of Neurology	Seminal research contributions in the search for the cause, prevention of, and cure for amyotrophic lateral sclerosis
United States	Stanley J. Korsmeyer Award	American Society for Clinical Investigation	Outstanding achievements advancing knowledge in a specific field and mentoring future generations of investigators in the life sciences
United States	Szent-Györgyi Prize for Progress in Cancer Research	National Foundation for Cancer Research	Researchers whose scientific achievements have expanded the understanding of cancer and whose vision has moved cancer research in new directions
United States	Llura Liggett Gund Award	Foundation Fighting Blindness	Career achievements that have significantly advanced the research and development of preventions, treatments and cures for eye disease
United States	Victor A. Prather Award	American Astronautical Society	Researchers, engineers and flight crew members in the field of extravehicular protection or activity in space
United States	Warren Alpert Foundation Prize	Warren Alpert Foundation	Scientific achievements that have led to the prevention, cure or treatment of human diseases or disorders, and/or whose research constitutes a seminal scientific finding that holds great promise of ultimately changing our understanding of or ability to treat disease
United States	Wiley Prize	Wiley Foundation	Breakthrough research in pure or applied life science research that is distinguished by its excellence, originality and impact on our understanding of biological systems and processes
United States	William Allan Award	American Society of Human Genetics	Substantial and far-reaching scientific contributions to human genetics carried out over a sustained period of scientific inquiry and productivity
United States	William B. Coley Award	Cancer Research Institute	Outstanding achievements in the fields of basic and tumor immunology and work that has deepened our understanding of the immune system's response to disease, including cancer
United States	William B. Graham Prize for Health Services Research	Baxter International	Contributions to health care research
United States	William Beaumont Prize	American Gastroenterological Association	Major contribution (a single accomplishment or series of accomplishments) that has significantly advanced care of patients with digestive diseases through clinical or translational research
United States	Med Honors Clinician Awards	Med Honors	Recognizes top doctors, plastic surgeons, and cosmetic dentists in the United States for excellence in patient care and medical practice
United States	Sedgwick Memorial Medal	American Public Health Association	Distinguished service and advancement of public health knowledge and practice

== Asia ==
Country	Award	Sponsor	Notes
Dubai	Sheikh Hamdan bin Rashid Al Maktoum Award for Medical Sciences	Board of Trustees	Medical research that serves the larger interests of humanity
Hong Kong	Shaw Prize	Shaw Prize Foundation	Outstanding contributions in medicine
India	Dr. B. C. Roy Award	Medical Council of India	Statesmanship of the Highest Order in India, Medical man-cum-Statesman, Eminent Medical Person, Eminent person in Philosophy, Eminent person in Science and Eminent person in Arts
India	Om Prakash Bhasin Award	Shri Om Prakash Bhasin Foundation	Health and Medical Sciences
Iran	Razi medical sciences research festival	Ministry of Health and Medical Education	innovation and research in medical sciences
Israel	Wolf Prize in Medicine	Wolf Foundation	Medicine
Japan	Hideyo Noguchi Africa Prize	Japan International Cooperation Agency	Outstanding achievements in the fields of medical research and medical services to combat infectious and other diseases in Africa, thus contributing to the health and welfare of the African people and of all humankind
Japan	Keio Medical Science Prize	Keio University	Significant contributions to the field of medical sciences or life sciences
South Korea	Asan Award in Medicine	Asan Foundation	Medical scientists devoting themselves to the country’s medical development
South Korea	Ho-Am Prize in Medicine	Ho-Am Foundation / Samsung	Individuals of Korean heritage who have furthered the welfare of humanity through distinguished accomplishments in the field of Medicine
Thailand	Prince Mahidol Award	Prince Mahidol Award Foundation	Outstanding achievements in medicine and public health worldwide
Saudi Arabia	King Faisal Prize	King Faisal Foundation	

== Europe ==
Country	Award	Sponsor	Notes
Belgium	Artois-Baillet Latour Health Prize	InBev-Baillet Latour Fund	Person whose work has contributed prominently to the improvement of human health in the fields of metabolic disorders, infectious diseases, neurological diseases, cancer and cardiovascular disease
Belgium	InBev-Baillet Latour Fund	Artois-Baillet Latour Foundation	Person whose work has contributed prominently to the improvement of human health in the fields of metabolic disorders, infectious diseases, neurological diseases, cancer and cardiovascular disease
Belgium	Marcel Linsman Prize	Linsman Foundation, AILg	Outstanding achievement in biomedical sciences, medicine, and neurosciences
Belgium	Oswald Vander Veken Prize	Research Foundation – Flanders (FWO) and the Fonds de la Recherche Scientifique-FNRS (F.R.S.-FNRS)	original contribution to knowledge about the tumours of the locomotor system (bone and soft tissue tumours)
Finland	Matti Äyräpää Prize	Finnish Medical Society Duodecim	Prize in medicine
France	Grand Prix scientifique de la Fondation NRJ	Institut de France	Medical science, particularly neuroscience
France	Danone International Prize for Nutrition	Danone Institute International	Individuals or teams that have advanced the science of human nutrition
France	Leopold Griffuel Prize	Fondation ARC	Translational and clinical research
France	Prix Guzman	Académie Nationale de Médecine	Person who succeeded in developing an effective treatment for the most common forms of heart disease
France, United States	Richard Lounsbery Award	French Academy of Sciences, National Academy of Sciences	American and French scientists, 45 years or younger, for extraordinary scientific achievement in biology and medicine
Germany	Aronson Prize	Senate of Berlin	Achievements in microbiology and immunology
Germany	Broermann Medical Innovation Award	Broermann Medical Innovation Award	Groundbreaking research, advancing medical science and innovation in healthcare
Germany	Ernst Jung Prize	Ernst Jung Foundation	Excellence in biomedical sciences
Germany	Max Delbrück Medal	Max Delbrück Center for Molecular Medicine in the Helmholtz Association	Outstanding scientist, on the occasion of the annual Berlin Lecture on Molecular Medicine
Germany	Meyenburg Prize	Meyenburg Foundation / German Cancer Research Center	Outstanding achievements in cancer research
Germany	Paul Ehrlich and Ludwig Darmstaedter Prize	Paul Ehrlich Foundation	Medical research in Immunology, Cancer research, Haematology, Microbiology and experimental and clinical Chemotherapy
Germany	Robert Koch Medal and Prize	Robert Koch Foundation	Gold Robert Koch Medallion for accumulated excellence in biomedical research / Robert Koch Prize for a major discovery in biomedical science
Hungary	Debrecen Award for Molecular Medicine	University of Debrecen	Extraordinary achievements in the field of biomedicine
Italy	Irving J. Selikoff Award and Lecture	Collegium Ramazzini	Internationally recognized scientist or humanist whose studies and achievements have contributed to the protection of workers' health and the environment
Italy	Ramazzini Award	Collegium Ramazzini	Scientists who have made outstanding contributions to furthering the aims of Bernardino Ramazzini in safeguarding public health
Norway	King Olav V's Prize for Cancer Research	Norwegian Cancer Society	Researcher who has distinguished himself through his scientific contributions to Norwegian cancer research
Portugal	António Champalimaud Vision Award	Champalimaud Foundation	Contributions to overall vision research / Contributions to the alleviation of visual problems
Portugal	BIAL Award in Biomedicine	BIAL Foundation	Seeks to recognise a work published in the broad biomedical field within the last ten years, the results of which are considered of exceptional quality and scientific relevance.
Soviet Union	People's Doctor of the USSR	Ministry of Health	Worthwhile contributions to public health improvement, for their peculiar skills and expertise and for having proved abnegation and high moral qualities in their duties fulfillment.
Sweden	Fernström Prize	Lund University	Prominent Swedish and Nordic scientists in medicine
Sweden	Nobel Prize in Physiology or Medicine	Nobel Foundation	Outstanding discoveries in the fields of life sciences and medicine
Sweden	Nordic Medical Prize	SalusAnsvar/Ulf Nilsonnes Foundation	Medical Research in cooperation with the insurance company Folksam
Switzerland	Cloëtta Prize	Max Cloëtta Foundation	Personalities who have distinguished themselves in biomedical research
Switzerland	Louis-Jeantet Prize for Medicine	Louis-Jeantet Foundation	Researchers who have distinguished themselves in the field of biomedical research in one of the member states of the Council of Europe
Switzerland	Novartis Prizes for Immunology	Novartis	Outstanding research in basic ad clinical immunology

=== United Kingdom ===
Country	Award	Sponsor	Notes
United Kingdom / United States	Donald Mackay Medal	Royal Society of Tropical Medicine and Hygiene and American Society of Tropical Medicine and Hygiene	Outstanding work in tropical health, especially relating to improvements in the health of rural or urban workers in the tropics
United Kingdom	Aldridge Medal	Orthodontic Technicians Association	To encourage members to present new research and developments at the annual conference
United Kingdom	Moxon Medal	Royal College of Physicians	Distinguished work in clinical medical research (not restricted to British subjects)
United Kingdom	Baly Medal	Royal College of Physicians	Person deemed to have most distinguished himself in the science of physiology
United Kingdom	Beit Memorial Fellowships for Medical Research	Beit Memorial Fellowship	Post-doctoral or medical degree research in medicine
United Kingdom	Bisset Hawkins Medal	Royal College of Physicians	Work done in the preceding ten years in advancing sanitary science or promoting public health
United Kingdom	Buchanan Medal	Royal Society	Distinguished contribution to the medical sciences generally
United Kingdom	Cameron Prize of the University of Edinburgh	University of Edinburgh	Highly important and valuable addition to Practical Therapeutics
United Kingdom	Chalmers Medal	Royal Society of Tropical Medicine and Hygiene	Researchers in tropical medicine or international health who obtained their last relevant qualification between 15 and 20 years ago, allowing for career breaks, who demonstrate evidence of mentoring and professional development of junior investigators ...
United Kingdom	Donald Reid Medal	London School of Hygiene & Tropical Medicine	Distinguished contributions to epidemiology
United Kingdom	Edward Jenner Medal	Royal Society of Medicine	Distinguished work in epidemiological research
United Kingdom	Ellison–Cliffe Lecture	Royal Society of Medicine	Lecture on subject connected with the contribution of fundamental science to the advancement of medicine
United Kingdom	President's Prize	Royal Society of Medicine	Three prizes, for distinguished research in Clinical Immunology and Allergy, Lipids, Metabolism and Vascular Risk, as well as Paediatrics and Child Health, respectively
United Kingdom	George Macdonald Medal	Royal Society of Tropical Medicine and Hygiene and the London School of Hygiene & Tropical Medicine	Outstanding contributions to tropical hygiene.
United Kingdom	GlaxoSmithKline Prize	Royal Society / GlaxoSmithKline	Original contributions to medical and veterinary sciences
United Kingdom	James Spence Medal	Royal College of Paediatrics and Child Health	Outstanding contributions to the advancement or clarification of paediatric knowledge
United Kingdom	Lister Medal	Royal College of Surgeons of England	Contributions to surgical science
United Kingdom	Cohen Medal	British Society for Research on Ageing	Individuals who have made a considerable contribution to ageing research, either through original discoveries or in the promotion of the subject of gerontology in its broadest aspect
United Kingdom	Manson Medal	Royal Society of Tropical Medicine and Hygiene	Contribution to tropical medicine or hygiene
United Kingdom	Mary Kingsley Medal	Liverpool School of Tropical Medicine	Outstanding contributions in the field of tropical medicine
United Kingdom	Medawar Medal	British Transplant Society	Best clinical and scientific research presentations by a scientist or doctor
United Kingdom	Moynihan Prize	Association of Surgeons of Great Britain and Ireland	Best abstract presented at the annual conference
United Kingdom	British Orthodontic Society Technicians Award	British Orthodontic Society and the Orthodontic Technicians Association	Orthodontic technicians who have made an outstanding contribution to their profession and orthodontics.
United Kingdom	Sir Rickard Christophers Medal	Royal Society of Tropical Medicine and Hygiene	Work in the field of tropical medicine and hygiene
United Kingdom	Syme Medal	Royal College of Surgeons of Edinburgh	Research undertaken as part of a doctoral thesis with particular consideration given to work that is likely to influence clinical practice
United Kingdom	UCL Prize Lecture in Clinical Science	University College London	Prize lecture on contemporary science
United Kingdom	Woolmer Lecture	Institute of Physics and Engineering in Medicine	Memorial lecture

== Oceania ==
Country	Award	Sponsor	Notes
Australia	Florey Medal	Australian Institute of Policy and Science	Biomedical research
Australia	Gottschalk Medal	Australian Academy of Science	Outstanding research by Australian scientists under 40 years of age for research in the medical sciences conducted mainly in Australia
Australia	New South Wales Cancer Institute Awards	Cancer Institute of New South Wales	Individuals and teams that work across the cancer research sector to lessen the impact of cancer for the people of NSW

== See also ==
- Lists of awards
- Lists of science and technology awards
- List of biomedical science awards
- List of psychology awards
- Competitions and prizes in biotechnology
