= AMDA =

AMDA or Amda may refer to:

- AMDA – Dedicated to Long Term Care Medicine, the organization formerly known as the American Medical Directors Association
- American Musical and Dramatic Academy, a college conservatory for the performing arts in New York City and Los Angeles
- 9-Aminomethyl-9,10-dihydroanthracene, an organic compound
- Anglo-Malayan Defence Agreement or Anglo-Malaysian Defence Agreement, a 1957 bilateral defence agreement

== People with the name ==
- Amda Iyasus, emperor of Ethiopia
- Amda Seyon (disambiguation), three different emperors of Ethiopia
