= Sarnoff (disambiguation) =

Sarnoff is a surname.

Sarnoff may also refer to:

- Sarnoff A. Mednick (1928–2015), researcher in the causes of psychopathology or mental disorders, Professor Emeritus of the University of Southern California
- Sarnoff Fellowship, for medical students interested in cardiovascular research
- Sarnoff Corporation, the former RCA labs
- Sarnoff Mountains, Marie Byrd Land, Antarctica
