= The Llura Liggett Gund Award =

Medical award

Llura Liggett Gund Award
- Description: Career achievements in retinal disease research
- Country: United States
- Presented by: Foundation Fighting Blindness
- Reward: Steuben crystal sculpture
- Website: www.fightingblindness.org

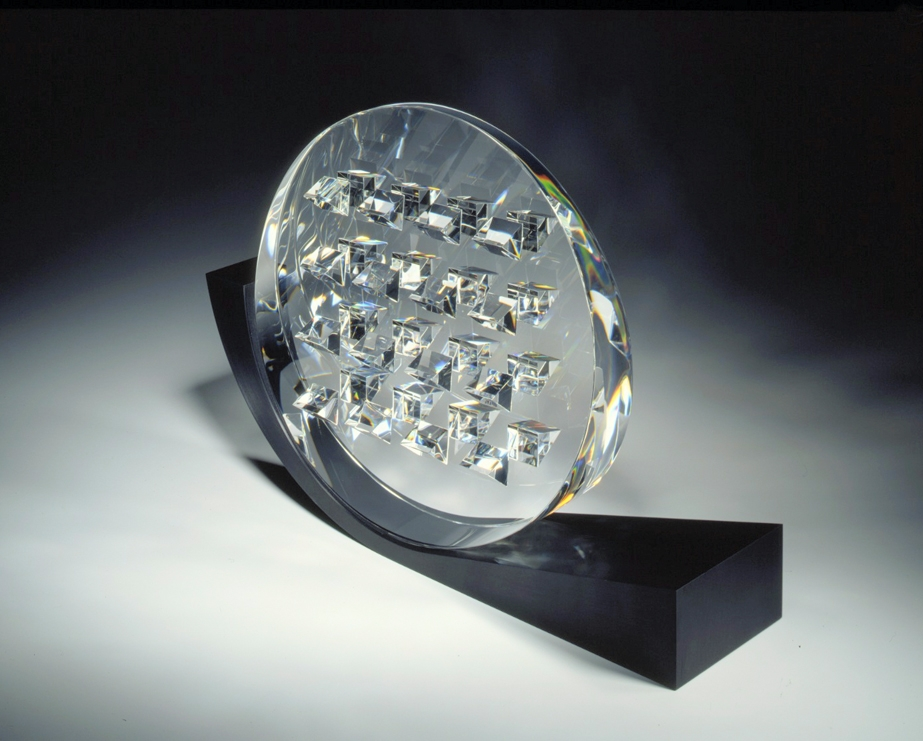
Llura Liggett Gund Award

The Llura Liggett Gund Award honors researchers for career achievements that have significantly advanced the research and development of preventions, treatments and cures for eye disease.

The award is the highest tribute presented by the Foundation Fighting Blindness, a nonprofit organization that funds research and clinical trials on eye disease. It is named after Llura Liggett Gund, a national trustee of the Foundation and wife of Gordon Gund, the Foundation’s cofounder and chairman. Awardees receive a custom-designed Steuben crystal sculpture.

According to its citation, the award recognizes “an individual whose outstanding dedication and commitment to retinal science for 15 years or more has resulted in highly significant advancements or breakthroughs in retinal degenerative disease research.”

== Recipients ==
The award is presented as warranted.

- 2016 - Richard Weleber, Casey Eye Institute, Oregon Health & Science University - for career achievement in the field of retinal-disease therapies.
- 2015 - José-Alain Sahel, Institut de la Vision in Paris - for his work on vision-saving treatments and cures.
- 2013 - William W. Hauswirth, Ph.D., the Maida and Morris Rybaczki Professor of Ophthalmology at the University of Florida College of Medicine. He received the award for using non-harmful adeno-associated viruses (AAVs) to transport healthy DNA into retinal cells at the back of the eye, showing that gene therapy could restore vision in animal models, including Briard dogs. His team’s approach was then used in human clinical trials where children and young adults virtually blind from Leber congenital amaurosis (LCA) have had significant vision restored.
- 2012 - Edwin Stone, M.D., Ph.D., the Seamans-Hauser Chair of Molecular Ophthalmology at the University of Iowa. Dr. Stone’s lab has been a leader in discovering and characterizing genes that cause retinal degenerations such as retinitis pigmentosa, Leber congenital amaurosis, and Stargardt disease, among other conditions. He and his colleagues are taking the new genetic information, creating models of disease, and then working to develop potential treatments for evaluation in clinical trials. This effort includes successfully converting a patient’s skin cells to stem cells, and then to retinal precursor cells to evaluate possible therapies.
- 2011 - Robert E. Anderson, M.D., Ph.D., professor of ophthalmology and cell biology at the Dean A. McGee Eye Institute and Professor of Ophthalmology and the George Lynn Cross Research Professor at the University of Oklahoma Health Sciences Center. He and his colleagues discovered years ago that omega-3 fatty acids found in fish oils are important for the most efficient and fastest development of the visual system, leading to their inclusion in infant formulas today.
- 2009 - Dean Bok, Ph.D., received the award for his work defining the link between vitamin A and vision. His research led the way in establishing the gene defect in the vitamin A metabolic cycle that ultimately directed researchers toward successful gene therapy clinical trials for Leber congenital amaurosis, a severe, early onset form of retinitis pigmentosa.
- 2007 - Matthew LaVail, Ph.D., received the award for his leadership role in understanding, identifying, and developing neuroprotective agents that slow or reverse vision loss. LaVail’s research has provided targets for the identification of dozens of potential treatments.
- 2001 - John Dowling, Ph.D., received the award for his groundbreaking work in understanding the functional organization of the retina, including synaptic organization, electrical responses of retinal neurons, and the exchange of retinoids in the visual cycle. Dowling's discoveries have been essential to the work of virtually every retinal researcher over the last several decades.
- 2000 - Eliot Berson, M.D., received the award for his discovery that vitamin A palmitate slows the rate of vision loss in people with retinitis pigmentosa (RP). As the only treatment for RP, vitamin A can potentially provide many additional years of useful vision.
- 1998 - Alan Laties, M.D., received the award in recognition of his career as a world-renowned neuro-ophthalmologist, neuro-ophthalmologic investigator, and educator in retinal science.

== See also ==
- List of medicine awards
