= Halbert L. Dunn Award =

The Halbert L. Dunn Award is the most prestigious award presented by the National Association for Public Health Statistics and Information Systems (NAPHSIS). The award has been presented since 1981 providing national recognition of outstanding and lasting contributions to the field of vital and health statistics at the national, state, or local level.

The award was established in honor of the late Halbert L. Dunn, M.D., Director of the National Office of Vital Statistics from 1936 to 1960. Dr. Dunn was highly instrumental in encouraging the states to establish state vital statistics associations and played a major role in developing NAPHSIS. The award is presented at the Hal Dunn Awards Luncheon during the association’s annual meeting.

The winners of the Halbert L. Dunn Award have been:

Source: NAPHSIS

- 1981 Deane Huxtable
- 1982 Loren Chancellor
- 1983 Vito Logrillo
- 1984 Carl Erhardt
- 1985 Irvin Franzen
- 1986 W. D. "Don" Carroll
- 1987 Margaret Shackelford
- 1988 John Brockert, State Registrar, Utah
- 1989 Margaret Watts
- 1990 John Patterson
- 1991 Patricia Potrzebowski, State Registrar, Pennsylvania
- 1992 Rose Trasatti, National Association for Public Health Statistics and Information Systems (NAPHSIS)
- 1993 Garland Land, State Registrar, Missouri
- 1994 George Van Amburg
- 1995 Jack Smith
- 1996 no award
- 1997 Ray Nashold
- 1998 Iwao Moriyama
- 1999 no award
- 2000 George Gay
- 2001 Dorothy Harshbarger, State Registrar, Alabama
- 2002 Lorne Phillips, State Registrar, Kansas
- 2003 Mary Anne Freedman, Director of the Division of Vital Statistics, NCHS
- 2004 no award
- 2005 Joe Carney
- 2006 Dan Friedman
- 2007 Harry Rosenberg, National Center for Health Statistics
- 2008 Alvin T. Onaka, Registrar, Hawaii
- 2009 Marshall Evans, National Center for Health Statistics
- 2010 Steven Schwartz, Registrar, New York City
- 2011 Charles Rothwell, Director, National Center for Health Statistics
- 2012 no award
- 2013 Stephanie Ventura, Director of Reproductive Statistics Branch, National Center for Health Statistics
- 2014 Bruce Cohen, Director of Research, MA Department of Health
- 2015 Isabelle Horon, State Registrar, Maryland
- 2016 Rose Trasatti Heim, NAPHSIS
- 2017 Jennifer Woodward, State Registrar, Oregon
- 2018 Glenn Copeland, State Registrar, Michigan
- 2019 Delton Atkinson, National Center for Health Statistics
- 2020 no award
- 2021 no award
- 2022 Jeff Duncan, State Registrar, Michigan
- 2023 no award
- 2024 no award
- 2025 Jeremy Peterson, Deputy State Registrar, Idaho
- 2026 Ken Jones, State Registrar, Florida

== See also ==
- List of mathematics awards
- List of medicine awards
