= COVID-19 in pregnancy =

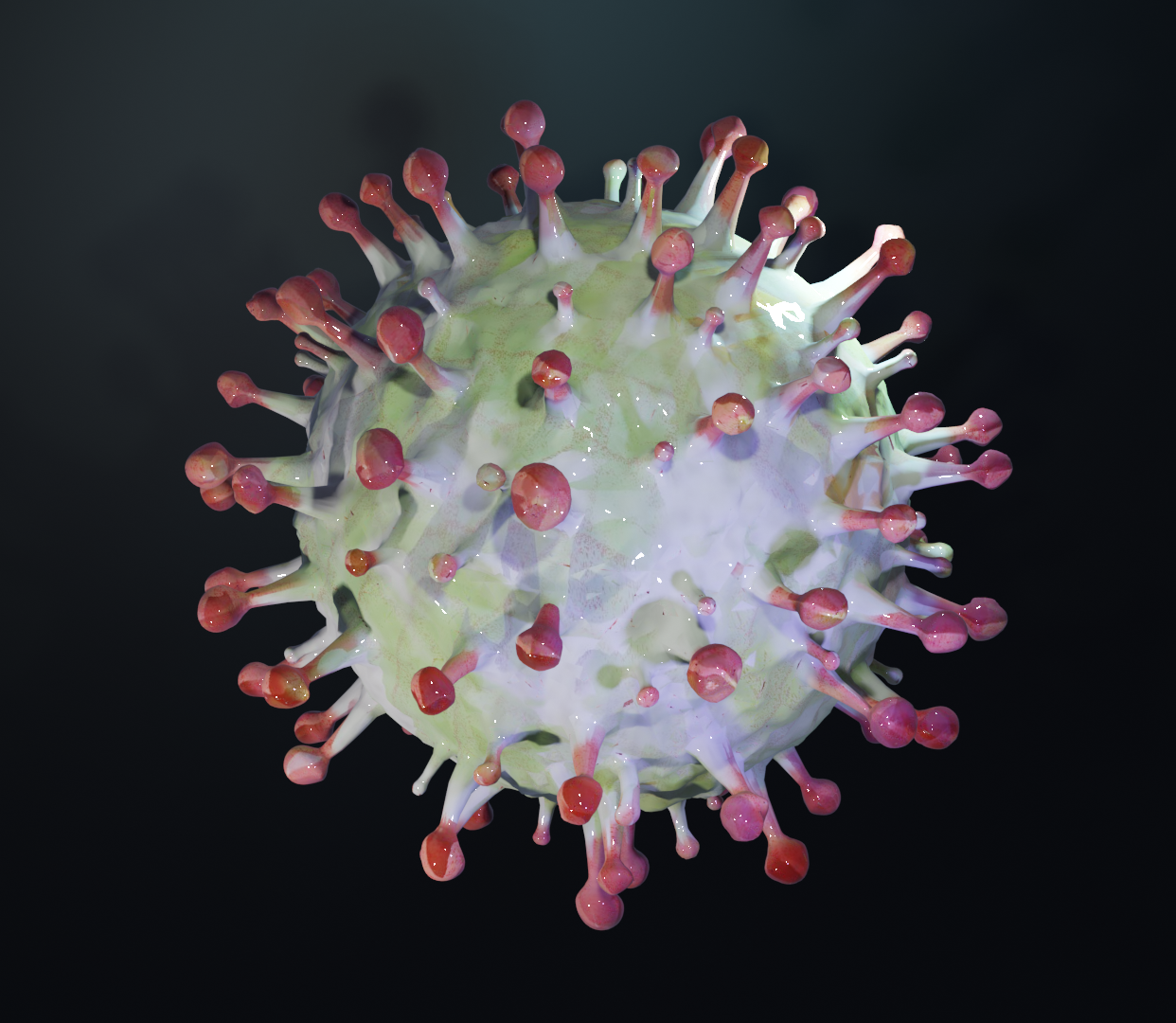
- Virtual model of coronavirus
- Risk factors: Severe infection
- Prevention: wearing a mask, covering cough, avoid interacting with sick people, cleaning hands with soap and water or sanitizer

COVID-19 infection in pregnancy is associated with several pregnancy complications. However, pregnancy does not appear to increase the susceptibility of becoming infected by COVID-19. Recommendations for the prevention of COVID-19 include the same measures as non-pregnant women.

== Effect of COVID-19 in pregnancy ==
COVID-19 in pregnancy
Complication	Odds ratio	95% confidence interval
Pre-eclampsia	1.33	1.03 to 1.73
Preterm birth	1.82	1.38 to 2.39
Stillbirth	2.11	1.14 to 3.90

According to a systematic review and meta-analysis in 2021, COVID-19 is associated with stillbirth, pre-eclampsia and preterm birth. According to the same review, compared with mild COVID-19, severe COVID-19 is strongly associated with preeclampsia, preterm birth, gestational diabetes and low birth weight.

A review in 2022 suggests that pregnant women are at increased risk of severe COVID-19 disease, with an increased rate of being hospitalized in the intensive care unit and requiring mechanical ventilation, but was not associated with a statistically significant increase in mortality.

A systematic review update in 2022 demonstrated that pregnant women are at increased risk of severe COVID-19. It also found that risk factors for severe COVID-19 in pregnant women included high body mass index, being of an older age, being of non-white ethnic origin, having pre-existing comorbidities, having pre-eclampsia or gestational diabetes.

A 2023 meta-analysis concluded that COVID-19 infection at any time during a pregnancy increases the risk of maternal death, severe maternal morbidities and neonatal morbidity, but not stillbirth or intrauterine growth restriction. Unlike earlier reviews, this study did not find a link between COVID-19 infection during pregnancy and increased risk of stillbirth at or beyond 28 weeks' gestation. This study used the first large set of pregnancy cohort data from sub-Saharan Africa.

A marked increase in cases of situs inversus was observed several months after the lifting of the zero-COVID-19 policy in China, which coincided with a rise in infections. This rare clinical evidence suggests a possible link between infection during pregnancy and the development of this condition in the fetus, specifically during gestational weeks 4–6, the critical period for organ positioning.

== Effect of SARS-CoV-2 on Fetal Neurodevelopment ==
Maternal infection increases the chance of neurodevelopmental disorders. The underlying mechanisms that cause this have not yet been elucidated. A 2024 study found impaired cardiac function in babies whose mothers contracted COVID-19 in the second trimester.

In two systematic reviews concluded that COVID-19 could potentially disrupt the neurodevelopment of the fetus as a consequence of the hyperinflammatory host response elicited by the viral infection through various possible mechanisms. However, it is still a controversial subject due to the complex nature of investigating an unaccounted unforeseen epidemic on already pregnant women or postpartum patients.

Vertical transmission of SARS-CoV-2 directly

It is uncertain if there is a direct route of SARS-CoV-2 from the mother to the fetus, but based on some studies, SARS-CoV-2 was present in the placental samples, amniotic fluid, or infant nasopharyngeal swabs of neonatal shows in utero infection. In a case report, it was confirmed through observing that the placental syncytiotrophoblastic cells and nasopharyngeal samples containing SARS-CoV-2 nucleocapsid proteins along with some viral substrates. However, in a systematic review of systematic reviews, it is sought as a rare event.

Host-virus interactions

The pro-inflammatory state could disrupt the placental development, which, in turn, results in preterm birth, preeclampsia, and restricted intrauterine growth.

=== The Neurodevelopmental invaded by SARS-CoV-2 ===
The exact mechanism of how it disrupts the normal neurogenesis had brought up different hypotheses:

The direct route of transplacental transmission. Like SARS-CoV, SARS-CoV-2 might create its entry point into the brain through the ACE2 receptor. As a result of viremia, the virus binds to the endothelial ACE2 receptors of the blood brain barrier (BBB) and this way it makes its entry point into the central nervous system (CNS). This was strongly explained in a study where post-mortem brain biopsies were analyzed on electron micrography, and viral particles were evident in the frontal cortex of SARS-CoV-2 infected adults. In addition, the violation of the sophisticated maternal-fetal interface by the virus could potentiate the exaggerated release of cytokines and the penetration of immune cells into the placenta and eventually to the fetus, hindering normal neurogenesis.

Cholinergic Anti-inflammatory Pathway (CAP). It is suspected that the virus disrupts CAP in suppressing the release of proinflammatory cytokines, either of the fetus or the mother, which triggers the hyperinflammatory state and increases the risk of neurodevelopmental disorders.

DNA methylation. Viral infection could alter DNA methylation patterns in genes involved with neurodevelopment.

Immune system—Itself. Infected immune cells that could express the ACE2 receptor might have a role in their dissemination to the brain through different portals: vasculatures, choroid plexus, and meninges.

Olfactory transport of infection. It is assumed that during laboring the offspring, neonatal infection could be acquired via direct contact with vaginal secretions or the physical or airborne route. The virus binds to ACE2 receptors of the olfactory epithelium and through this channel, the virus could be able to pave its way to the CNS.

Retrograde axonal transport. The gut neurons might have transported the viruses into the nervous system.

== Recommendations ==
=== Prevention ===
The World Health Organization (WHO) and Centers for Disease Control and Prevention (CDC) of the United States advises pregnant women to do the same things as the general public to avoid infection, such as wearing a mask where it is not possible to keep sufficient physical distance from others; covering cough, avoid interacting with sick people, cleaning hands with soap and water or sanitizer.

Vaccination against COVID-19 was not associated with an increase in miscarriage or a reduction in live birth. Meta-analysis has not identified any pregnancy-specific safety concerns with vaccines.

The data overwhelmingly support maternal vaccination as being effective at reducing the risk for infection and severe illness.

Studies seem to show that completion of a two-dose mRNA vaccination during pregnancy reduces hospital admissions for COVID-19 among infants under 6 months, but there is insufficient evidence for how long protection continues for an infant after birth.

The WHO states that pregnant women can receive covid-19 vaccines and, if not already vaccinated, should have access to WHO Emergency Use Listing-approved vaccines, as the benefits of vaccination during pregnancy outweigh potential risks. The Royal College of Obstetricians and Gynaecologists in the UK strongly recommends vaccination in pregnancy and prefers that the Pfizer-BioNTech or Moderna mRNA vaccines are offered where available due to greater amounts of data on that vaccine type. In America, the CDC, the American College of Obstetricians and Gynecologists and Society for Maternal-Fetal Medicine encourage pregnant women to get COVID-19 vaccines. The Federation of Obstetric and Gynaecological Societies of India recommends vaccination, though it is not currently recommended by the Government of India. More than 80 countries do not currently recommend that all pregnant and lactating women should be vaccinated. "As of today," the CDC no longer recommends healthy children and pregnant women to be vaccinated against Covid-19 as announced by the U.S. Health and Human Services (HHS) Secretary Robert F. Kennedy Jr., although there's no change in the official CDC website. The ACOG, the American College of Obstetricians and Gynecologists, responded with concerns and disappointments because the vaccine is safe to protect both the patient and her newborn, who is too young to be eligible for the vaccine. At the same time, COVID-19 could be "catastrophic" with "devastating consequences for both patients and families." Two days later, the CDC website has complied with the (HHS) Secretary's directive by taking off the recommendation for pregnant women: "Delay vaccination until after pregnancy if vaccine is indicated."

=== Treatment ===
A state-of-the-art review published in 2022 stated that the basic principles of diagnosing and managing COVID-19 should be the same for pregnant patients as for non-pregnant patients. It recommended that treatment with corticosteroids should be modified to use non-fluorinated glucocorticoids and that Il-6 inhibitors and monoclonal antibodies could be used, as could specific antiviral therapies.

Pregnancy is not a contraindication for therapies including respiratory support with oxygen, non-invasive ventilation, ventilation in a prone position, intubation and ventilation, and extracorporeal membrane oxygenation.

== See also ==
- Vertically transmitted infection
- Gendered impact of the COVID-19 pandemic
- Impact of the COVID-19 pandemic on abortion in the United States
