= Sarnov =

Sarnov is a surname, it comes from Russian Сарнов. Another (German) transcription is Sarnoff. Notable people with the surname include:

- Benedikt Sarnov (1927–2014), Russian literary critic and historian of literature
- David Sarnov (1891–1971), American businessman
