= Quilligan Scholars =

The Quilligan Scholars award, named after one of the founding fathers of Maternal-Fetal Medicine, Dr. Edward J. Quilligan, is a prestigious title in the field of Maternal-Fetal Medicine granted by the Society for Maternal-Fetal Medicine and The Pregnancy Foundation to a select group of promising residents in obstetrics and gynaecology who exhibit unparalleled potential to become future leaders in the field of perinatology.

== Purpose ==
The purpose of the Quilligan Scholars Program is to identify future leaders in Perinatology early in their training and to offer them recognition, guidance, and educational opportunities to foster their careers. These individuals traditionally exhibit leadership, commitment, and interest in teaching, research, or public policy. Some of the activities provided by the program include paid attendance to the SMFM annual meeting, the provision of special courses and experiences, and the granting of personal mentorship from current leaders in the field of Maternal-fetal Medicine.

== History ==
The year 2013 marked the 40th anniversary of the formal establishment of Maternal-fetal medicine (MFM) as a specialty, as 16 pioneers took the MFM boards for the first time in 1973. Amongst that group of pioneers was Dr. Edward J. Quilligan, who has gone on to dedicate decades of service to the advancement of women's health, through teaching, research, and leadership. To honour his legacy and his exemplary service to modern Obstetrics, the Society for Maternal-Fetal Medicine and The Pregnancy Foundation created the Quilligan Scholars program, and the first class of five recipients was inaugurated in 2014 at the Society for Maternal-Fetal Medicine annual meeting in New Orleans, Louisiana. Though the Quilligan Scholar title confers no monetary reward, the sponsored activities are covered by gracious donations from members of the medical community. The Society for Maternal-Fetal Medicine has agreed to give matching funds to the amount raised by The Pregnancy Foundation up to $125,000 per year for three years.

== Recipients ==
The Quilligan Scholar title is traditionally granted to five recipients every year.

The 2014 recipients are:

Recipient	Institution
Dr. Sarah Rae Easter	Harvard University
Dr. Mohak Mhatre	Yale University
Dr. Malavika Prabhu	University of Washington
Dr. Emily Scibetta	University of California, San Francisco
Dr. Amanda Yeaton-Massey	Stanford University

The 2015 recipients are:

Recipient	Institution
Dr. Yalda Afshar	Cedars-Sinai Medical Center
Dr. Jacques Balayla	McGill University
Dr. Mark Clapp	Harvard University
Dr. Ahizechukwu Eke	Michigan State University
Dr. Ibrahim Hammad	Eastern Virginia Medical School

On July 6, 2021, the name of the award was changed from "Quilligan Scholars" to "Resident Scholars."

== See also ==
- List of medicine awards
