= Ajit Someshwar =

Ajit H. Someshwar (passed 13-Jan-2025 in Mumbai, India) was an Indo-Canadian entrepreneur, philanthropist and social activist based in Toronto, Ontario, Canada. He was President and CEO of CSI Group of Companies. As per the Canadian Immigrant (magazine) (owned by the Toronto Star), he owned and had investments in dozens of others companies from custom draperies to real estate. He was the co-founder and outgoing National Convenor of the Canada India Foundation—a public policy organization. Someshwar was appointee of the Government of Canada Board of the Export Development Canada—Canada's export credit agency. Prior to this, during the 2008-2009 global recession crises, Canadian finance minister Jim Flaherty appointed Someshwar to an 11-member advisory panel along with likes of Mike Lazaridis, Annette Verschuren and Geoff Beattie to advise him on the federal budget and the economy. It was announced that Someshwar, along with the other 10 members, were only paid a dollar a year for their insight.

== Early life and education ==
Someshwar was born in Bombay (Mumbai). He obtained a degree in Commerce and Economics from the University of Bombay. He is also has a Chartered Accountancy (C.A.) designation from India and England. Prior to starting his businesses in the early 1990s, he was vice-president of operations, planning and analysis for CIBC's assurance venture. He moved to Canada from England.

== Philanthropy ==
Someshwar is an active fundraiser for hospitals, charities and the arts. In September 2010, Someshwar along with fellow businessmen Vasu Chanchlani and Bhupinder Khalsa donated a Maple-Leaf Shaped Monument to the Canadian Armed Forces for their exemplary service as global peacekeepers. The unveiling ceremony was attended by a large number of Canadian Armed Forces personnel in their ceremonial attire, as well as top leaders including defence minister Peter Mackay, opposition leader Michael Ignatieff, and finance minister Jim Flaherty.

== Public Policy ==
Someshwar is an active public speaker and participant in various policy forums. He is co-founder and founding National Convenor of the Canada India Foundation and in that capacity advised governments on both sides on the Canada India Civil Nuclear treaty. He has been very vocal about the importance for the provincial and federal governments to put in a concerted effort on regularizing immigrants' professional qualifications and experience, making the process of absorbing them into the Canadian system a little less painful.

== Appointments & Awards ==
- Board member, Export Development Canada
- National Convenor, Canada India Foundation
- President, Indo-Canada Chamber of Commerce (1991–93)
- Member, Canada's Economic Advisory council
