= John Travis (physician) =

American author and medical practitioner

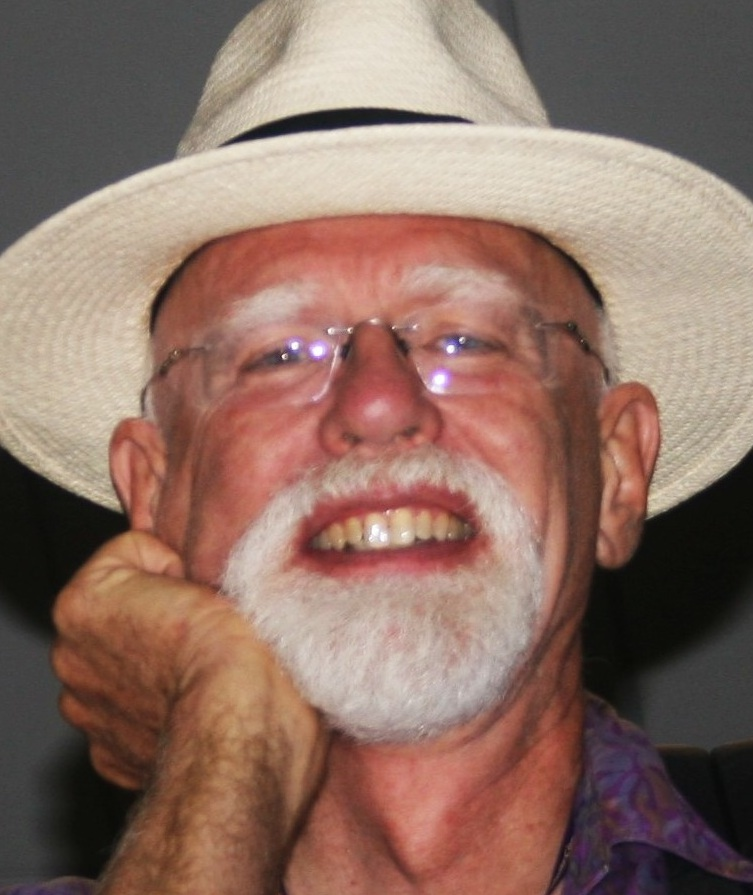
- Born: John Walton Travis; January 11, 1943 (age 83) Bluffton, Ohio U. S.
- Occupation: Author and physician
- Education: BA, The College of Wooster; MD, Tufts University School of Medicine; MPH, Johns Hopkins Bloomberg School of Public Health;

John W. Travis is an American author and medical practitioner. He is a proponent of the alternative medicine concept of "wellness", originally proposed in 1961 by Halbert L. Dunn, and has written books on the subject. In the 1970s, Travis founded the first "wellness center" in California. He originated the Illness–Wellness Continuum.

== Early life and education ==
Travis earned his BA from College of Wooster in 1965, followed by an MD from Tufts University School of Medicine in 1969, and spent six years as a commissioned officer in the United States Public Health Service. At this time, he completed a residency in preventive medicine at Johns Hopkins Bloomberg School of Public Health, which included a Masters in Public Health, awarded in 1971.

== Career ==
Between 1975 and 1979 he opened and ran the Wellness Resource Center in Mill Valley, California. He closed the center in 1979 and established Wellness Associates, a non-profit educational corporation.

In 2000, he moved to Australia, where he has continued to work in the field of adult and infant wellness. Between 2008 and 2016, he was an adjunct professor in the Wellness Program at Royal Melbourne Institute of Technology He is also a member of the Advisory Board, Integrative Health Studies master's degree, at California Institute of Integral Studies in San Francisco.

== Wellness ==
Travis has cited Halbert L. Dunn's 1961 book, High-Level Wellness as one of the influences which led him to found the Wellness Resource Center. The center focused on the individual's overall state of wellbeing and encouraged “self-directed approaches” to improving health. In 1975, he self-published the Wellness Inventory. This utilized a whole-person model, based on a "Wellness Energy System" that comprised 12 dimensions, incorporating nutrition, exercise, stress, and the social environment. He first wrote and self-published the Wellness Workbook in 1977. This was later re-published in collaboration with Regina Ryan, and had sold 175,000 copies by 2005. In 1979 he was interviewed by Dan Rather on 60 Minutes, which helped to bring the concept of wellness to national attention.

== Illness-Wellness Continuum ==

The Illness-Wellness Continuum is a graphical illustration of a wellbeing concept first proposed by Travis in 1972. It proposes that wellbeing includes mental and emotional health, as well as the presence or absence of illness.

=== Concept ===
Travis believed that a medical approach that relied on the presence or absence of symptoms of disease to demonstrate wellness was insufficient. As shown in the Continuum, the right side reflects degrees of wellness, while the left indicates degrees of illness. The model has been used to describe how, in the absence of physical disease, an individual can have depression, anxiety or other conditions.

He contends that medicine typically treats injuries, disabilities, and symptoms, to bring the individual to a "neutral point" where there is no longer any visible illness. However, the Wellness Paradigm requires moving the state of wellbeing further along the continuum towards optimal emotional and mental states. The concept assumes that wellbeing is a dynamic rather than a static process.

The Illness-Wellness Continuum proposes that individuals can move farther to the right, towards greater health and wellbeing, passing through the stages of awareness, education, and growth. Worsening states of health are reflected by signs, symptoms and disability.

In addition, a person's outlook can affect wellness. According to the concept, a positive outlook will enhance health and wellbeing, while a negative outlook will hinder it, independent of the current health status. For example, a person who demonstrates no symptoms of disease, but is constantly complaining, will be facing the left side of the Continuum and away from a state of high-level wellness. Conversely, a person with a disability, but who maintains a positive outlook, will be facing to the right, toward a high level of wellness. It is less important where a person is on the Continuum than the direction they are facing.

The Illness-Wellness Continuum has been viewed as promoting preventive treatment, which improves wellbeing before an individual presents with signs or symptoms of illness, as well as educating people to be aware of and avoid risk factors, in order to protect against pathology and premature death.

=== Historical context ===
Travis began developing his Continuum in 1972 and it was first published in 1975 in the Wellness Inventory. Since then the concept has been applied to fields such as medicine, nursing, counseling, physical therapy, public health, and organizational development.

== Parenting ==
Since 1991, Travis has focused on attachment parenting, connection parenting, and infant wellbeing in conjunction with Meryn Callander. In 1999 they co-founded the Alliance for Transforming the Lives of Children (aTLC). He has criticized the practice of male infant circumcision, voicing support for the principle of body integrity for young males and challenging the legality of parental decision making in relation to circumcision.

== Non-government organizations (NGOs) ==
Travis is co-founder of:

Coalition for Improving Maternity Services (1996),

Alliance for Transforming the Lives of Children (1999)

International Coalition for Genital Integrity (1999).

== Publications ==
- Wellness Inventory (Wellness Associates, 1975, 1981, 1988, 2003) ISBN 978-0-9625882-0-4
- Wellness Workbook, coauthored with Regina Ryan (Ten Speed Press, 1981, 1988, Celestial Arts, 2004) ISBN 978-1-58761-213-8
- Simply Well: Choices for a Healthy Life, coauthored with Regina Ryan (Ten Speed Press, 1990, 2001) ISBN 978-1-58008-292-1
