= Syme Medal =

Research prize

The Syme Medal is a research prize that is awarded annually by the Royal College of Surgeons of Edinburgh in honour of James Syme (1799-1870) who was elected as its President in 1849. The medal is typically awarded for research undertaken as part of a doctoral thesis with particular consideration given to work that is likely to influence clinical practice.

== See also ==
- List of medicine awards
