= Wellness (alternative medicine) =

Holistic concept of health

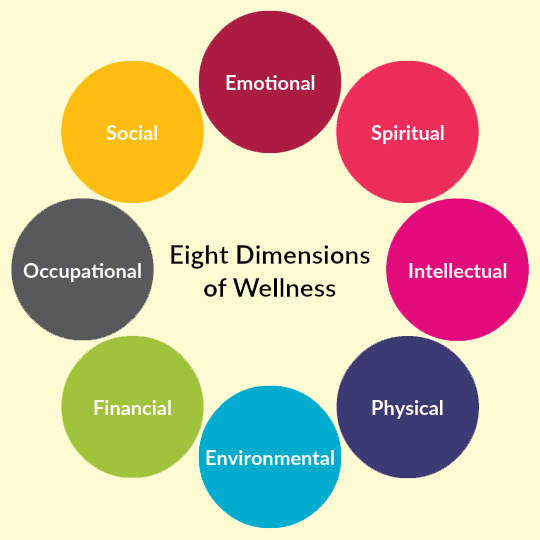
The Eight Dimensions of Wellness

Wellness is a state beyond absence of illness but rather aims to optimize well-being.

The notions behind the term share the same roots as the alternative medicine movement. In 19th-century movements in the US and Europe that sought to optimize health and to consider the whole person, like New Thought, Christian Science, and Lebensreform. Ayurveda mentions the concept and also has dedicated a whole speciality for the concept of wellness and maintenance of health.

The term wellness has also been misused for pseudoscientific health interventions.

== History ==
The term was partly inspired by the preamble to the World Health Organization's 1948 constitution which said: "Health is a state of complete physical, mental and social well-being and not merely the absence of disease or infirmity." It was initially brought into use in the United States by Halbert L. Dunn, M.D. in the 1950s; Dunn was the chief of the National Office of Vital Statistics and discussed “high-level wellness,” which he defined as “an integrated method of functioning, which is oriented toward maximizing the potential of which the individual is capable.” The term "wellness" was then adopted by John Travis who opened a "Wellness Resource Center" in Mill Valley, California in the mid-1970s, which was seen by mainstream culture as part of the hedonistic culture of Northern California at that time and typical of the Me generation. Travis marketed the center as alternative medicine, opposed to what he said was the disease-oriented approach of medicine. The concept was further popularized by Robert Rodale through Prevention magazine, Bill Hetler, a doctor at University of Wisconsin–Stevens Point, who set up an annual academic conference on wellness, and Tom Dickey, who established the Berkeley Wellness Letter in the 1980s. The term had become accepted as standard usage in the 1990s.

Since the beginning of the 21st century, it has been noted that mainstream news sources have begun to devote more page space to "health and wellness themes", and wellness gurus have gained more prominence.

== Dimensions of wellness ==
In the 1970s, Bill Hettler, a doctor at the University of Wisconsin, developed a six-factor model of wellness, now commonly known as the dimensions of wellness. The original dimensions included intellectual, emotional, physical, social, occupational, and spiritual wellnesses. Since then, a number of organisations and researchers have adapted the dimensions of wellness into their health programs, including the US Substance Abuse and Mental Health Services Administration, which includes two more dimensions of wellness—environmental and financial—along with the original six. Many universities have also incorporated the dimensions of wellness into their student care programmes.

== Corporate wellness programs ==
By the late 2000s, the concept had become widely used in employee assistance programs in workplaces, and funding for development of such programs in small business was included in the Affordable Care Act. The use of corporate wellness programs has been criticized as being discriminatory to people with disabilities. Additionally, while there is some evidence to suggest that wellness programs can save money for employers, such evidence is generally based on observational studies that are prone to selection bias. Randomized trials provide less positive results and often suffer from methodological flaws.

The discrimination against disabled people in corporate wellness programs was one of the many reasons that prompted the creation of the Americans with Disabilities Act of 1990. Under the newly proposed Americans with Disabilities Act rule, an employee-wellness program consists of programs that relates to health promotion or disease prevention that includes disability-related inquiries or medical examinations. There are two types of wellness programs that are under the Americans with Disabilities Act: Participatory and Health-contingent. This newly proposed rule no longer contains the requirement that such programs be reasonably designed to promote health or prevent disease.

== Criticism ==
=== Promotion of pseudoscience ===
Wellness is a particularly broad term, but it is often used by promoters of unproven medical therapies, such as the Food Babe or Goop. Jennifer Gunter has criticized what she views as a promotion of over-diagnoses by the wellness community. Goop's stance is that it is "skeptical of the status quo" and "offer[s] open-minded alternatives." Michael D. Gordin writes that pseudoscience is a bad category for analysis because it exists entirely as a negative attribution that scientists and non-scientists hurl at others but never apply themselves. Pseudoscience is typically used to describe something that looks like science, but is somehow false, misleading, or unproven. Practices that fall under the pseudoscience umbrella include: astrology, phrenology, UFOlogy, creationism, and eugenics.

=== Healthism ===
Wellness has also been criticized for its focus on lifestyle changes over a more general focus on harm prevention that would include more establishment-driven approaches to health improvement such as accident prevention. Petr Skrabanek has also criticized the wellness movement for creating an environment of social pressure to follow its lifestyle changes without having the evidence to support such changes. Some critics also draw an analogy to Lebensreform, and suggest that an ideological consequence of the wellness movement is the belief that "outward appearance" is "an indication of physical, spiritual, and mental health."

=== Conspirituality ===
Wellness has been criticized as a gateway to extreme conspiracy beliefs and practices. The Society for the Scientific Investigation of Parasciences has found that alternative medicine communities and conspiracy ideologies share a lot of similarities in that they have a “a strongly dualistic worldview of good versus evil; a desire for a simple answer to complicated questions; and an anti-scientific tendency”. During the covid lockdown there has been an increase of far-right wellness influencers linking themselves with the political beliefs of QAnon conspiracies, causing an increase of misinformation and adding numbers to the group. Both groups connect on similar beliefs including: anti-vaccination, COVID-19 misinformation and the idea that there is a secret organization of government officials running a child trafficking sex ring.

The wellness trend has been criticized as a form of conspicuous consumption.

== See also ==
- Complementary and alternative medicine
- Healthism
- Mindfulness
- Organic food culture
- Salutogenesis
- Self-care
- Well-being
- Wellness tourism
- Workplace wellness
