= Halbert L. Dunn =

Halbert Dunn
- Born: 1897; New Paris, Ohio
- Died: 1975 (aged 77–78); Silver Springs, Maryland
- Occupation: Medical practitioner

Halbert L. Dunn, M.D. (1896–1975) was the leading figure in establishing a national vital statistics system in the United States and is known as the "father of the wellness movement".

== Early life ==
Born in New Paris, Ohio, he attended the University of Minnesota where he earned his M.D. in 1922 and his Ph.D. in 1923. He served as an assistant in medicine at Presbyterian Hospital of New York City 1923-1924 and as fellow in medicine at the Mayo Clinic in Rochester, Minnesota (1924–1925).

== Work in statistics ==
In 1929, he was the first biostatistician hired by the Mayo Clinic and established its coding system for deriving medical statistics. He was Chief of the National Office of Vital Statistics from 1935 through 1960, first as part of the Bureau of the Census and later under the Department of Health, Education and Welfare, where it eventually became the National Center for Health Statistics in 1960. In his final year with the U.S. Public Health Service he was Assistant Surgeon General for aging.

He was one of the founders of the National Association for Public Health Statistics and Information Systems (NAPHSIS) and of the Inter-American Statistics Institute (IASI). He was Secretary General of the IASI from 1941 to 1952. The Halbert L. Dunn Award, named in his honor, has been presented since 1981 by NAPHSIS in recognition of outstanding and lasting contributions to the field of vital and health statistics.

== Wellness ==
Dunn is known as the "father" of the wellness movement. He distinguished between good health—not being ill—and what he termed high-level wellness, which he defined as "a condition of change in which the individual moves forward, climbing toward a higher potential of functioning". He introduced the concept in a series of twenty-nine lectures at the Unitarian Church in Arlington County, Virginia in the late 1950s, which provided the basis for his book, High Level Wellness, published in 1961. The book was reissued in a number of editions but did not have a great deal of immediate impact. It did, however, come into the hands of a number of the future leaders of the wellness and holistic health movement that bloomed more than a decade later, such as Don B. Ardell, Robert Russell, John Travis, and Elizabeth Neilson.

Four events in the mid-1970s broadened the impact of Dunn's ideas. First, John Travis opened the first US wellness center (Mill Valley, CA, 1975). This center and other organizations were then described in Don Ardell's 1977 book, using Dunn's title (giving Dunn due credit for his origination of the title and concept). Then Elizabeth Neilson founded the journal Health Values: Achieving High-Level Wellness (renamed the American Journal of Health Promotion in 1996), which was dedicated to Dunn and reprinted one of his papers in its first edition. Lastly, the publisher of Health Values, Charles B. Slack, Inc., published a reprint edition of Dunn's High-Level Wellness that achieved a wider distribution and impact.

In 2014, John Travis discovered that Dunn had 3 sons, the last of whom had recently died. However, his wife was still alive. John interviewed her for his "An Oral History of Wellness" project (HELP Proper link needed to the interview at https://www.youtube.com/watch?v=Y5AuyI8zt6g), learning much about Halbert's personal life.

== Sources ==
- Ardell, D. B. (1977). High Level Wellness: An Alternative to Doctors, Drugs and Disease. Emmaus, PA: Rodale.
- Ardell, D. B. (Dec. 29, 2000). A (very) brief history of the wellness concept. Wellness in the Headlines (Don's Report to the World).
- Dunn, H.L. (1961). High-Level Wellness. Arlington, VA: Beatty Press.
- Dunn, H.L. (1977). High Level Wellness. Thorofare, NJ: Charles, B. Slack.
- Dunn, H.L. (1977). What High Level Wellness Means. Health Values, 1(1), 9–16.
- Neilson, E. A. (1988). Health Values: Achieving high level wellness—Origin, philosophy, purpose. Health Values, 12(3):3-5.
- Rice, S. A. (1967). Conception, gestation and birth of the IASI. The American Statistician, 21(3), 15-19
- Travis, J. W., and Ryan, R. S. (1981, 1988, 2004) Wellness Workbook, Ten Speed Press/Celestial Arts
