= Edmund Sonnenblick =

American cardiologist (1932–2007)

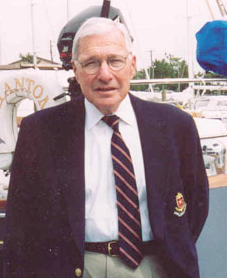
- Dr. Edmund Sonnenblick
- Born: Edmund Hiram Sonnenblick; December 7, 1932; New Haven, Connecticut, United States
- Died: September 22, 2007 (aged 74); Darien, Connecticut, United States
- Education: Wesleyan University; Harvard Medical School
- Known for: Cardiac muscle cell research
- Spouse: Linda Bland (m. 1954)
- Awards: American College of Cardiology Distinguished Scientist Award (1989); American Heart Association Research Achievement Award (2007)
- Scientific career
- Fields: Cardiology
- Workplaces: Albert Einstein College of Medicine; Harvard Medical School

Edmund Hiram Sonnenblick (December 7, 1932 – September 22, 2007) was an American medical researcher and cardiologist. His studies of the function of cardiac muscle cells during the 1960s proved that the heart behaves as a muscle, and thus shaped the basis of both cardiovascular physiology and the modern treatment of cardiovascular disease, making possible the development of ACE inhibitors. In 1962, he was credited as the first person to image the heart muscle under scientifically-controlled conditions using the electron microscope. Though Sonnenblick's ideas about the relationship between the structure and function of the human heart today constitute medical-scientific commonsense, they were utterly novel at the time.

Reflecting on Sonnenblick's discoveries, Harvard cardiologist Eugene Braunwald wrote that "Ed Sonnenblick occupies an honored place along with Ernest Starling, Carl Wiggers, and very few others in the pantheon of the greatest cardiovascular physiologists of the twentieth century." After Sonnenblick's death in 2007, a tribute published in the prominent peer-reviewed journal Circulation Research remembered Sonnenblick as "simply an intellectual giant in the field of cardiovascular research, and the work that he did will forever shape everyday treatments of heart disease." Another tribute hailed him as "one of the most prominent and important cardiologists in the history of American medicine"

== Early life ==
Sonnenblick was born in New Haven, Connecticut on December 7, 1932, to Israel "Ira" and Rosalind Sonnenblick. He grew up in Hartford, Connecticut, and after graduating as the salutatorian of his high school class, he attended Wesleyan University. He graduated summa cum laude and Phi Beta Kappa in 1954.

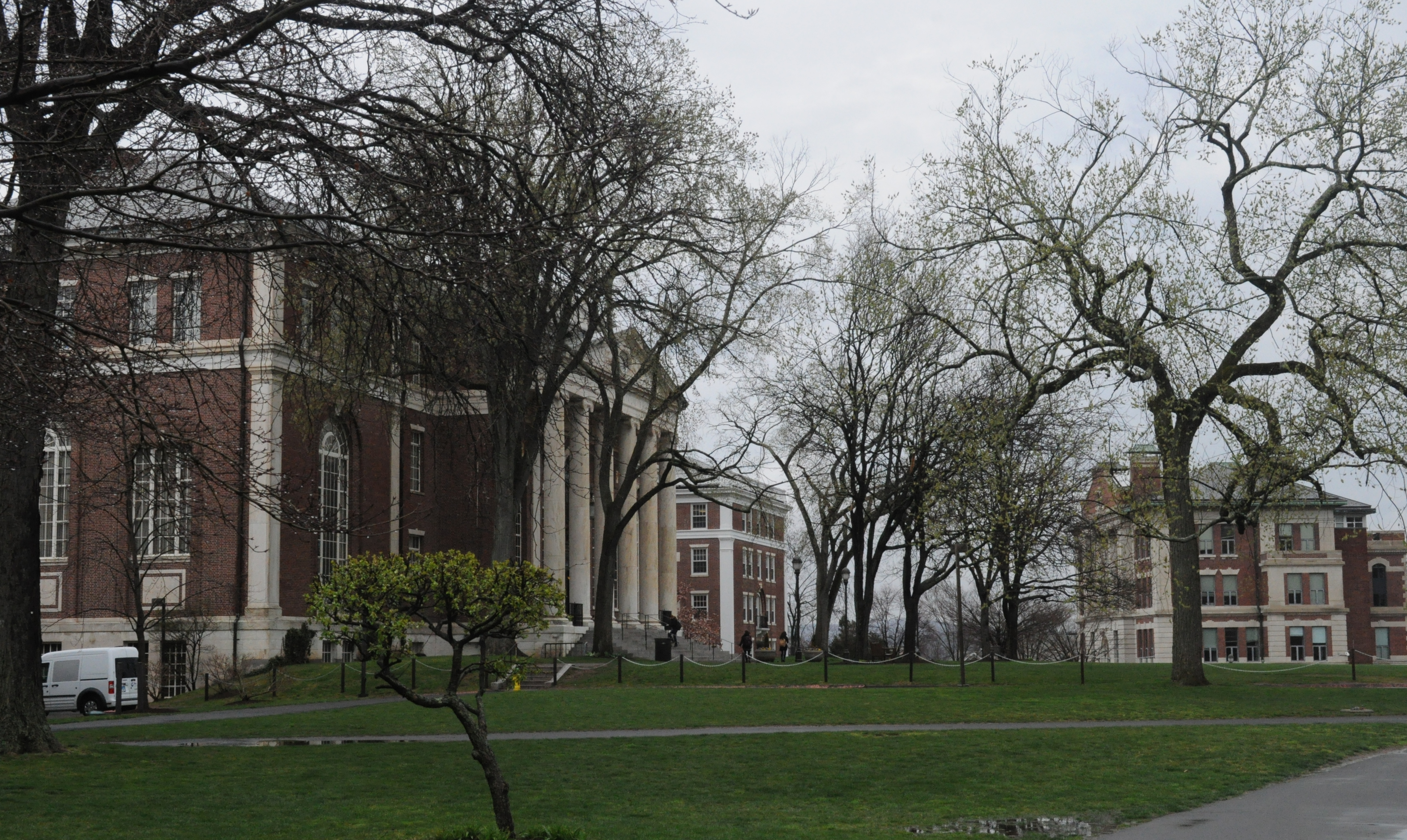
Wesleyan University, Sonnenblick's alma mater

After completing his B.A., Sonnenblick matriculated at Harvard Medical School. He graduated cum laude and Alpha Omega Alpha in 1958. He began his residency in internal medicine at Columbia-Presbyterian Hospital in New York City.

== Career ==
=== National Heart Institute and National Institutes of Health: 1960–1966 ===
In 1960, with the completion of his residency at Columbia-Presbyterian, Sonnenblick joined the Laboratory of Cardiovascular Physiology at the National Heart Institute in Bethesda, Maryland, directed by Stanley Sarnoff. There he initiated the foundational studies on the function and structure of heart muscle that would underpin the modern understanding of ventricular function. In 1962, he published a landmark, single-author paper, "Force-velocity relations in mammalian heart muscle," in the American Journal of Physiology. In the paper, he showed that muscle mechanisms account directly for the quantity of blood pumped by the heart. Among other things, this finding provided justification for therapeutic afterload reduction.

Sarcomere structure, the focus of Sonnenblick's electron microscopy work

In 1963, Sonnenblick transferred to the Cardiology Branch at the National Institutes of Health, directed by Eugene Braunwald. Though he would later allegedly have serious misgivings about Braunwald's leadership, they worked together to publish a series of articles applying the concepts of preload, afterload, and contractility to normal and pathological states. Sonnenblick also led investigations into the structural bases of mechanical function, myocardial energetics, and the actions of catecholamines and thyroid hormone on the myocardium. He began investigating heart cell muscle contractions using quantitative electron microscopy that same year, arguing that the positional relationship between filaments within heart muscle cells affects the force of those cells' contractions. Braunwald later told The New York Times that Sonnenblick's work during this period was akin to "what a brilliant mathematician or theoretical physicist does that ultimately allows you to go into space."

=== Peter Bent Brigham Hospital: 1967–1974 ===
In 1967, Sonnenblick was recruited to Peter Bent Brigham Hospital in Boston as director of cardiovascular research and co-director, with Dr. Richard Gorlin, of the cardiovascular unit. He was also made an associate professor of medicine at Harvard Medical School. In Boston, he continued his research and trained a group of cardiologists who went on to lead their own research laboratories and divisions of cardiology. Among his notable discoveries during this period was his description of a functional defect in the sarcoplasmic reticulum of the heart of the hereditary cardiomyopathic hamster—one of the first identified biochemical defects in the failing heart.

=== Albert Einstein College of Medicine: 1975–2007 ===
In 1975, Sonnenblick relocated to New York City and was appointed the inaugural director of the Cardiology Division and Olson Professor of Medicine at the Albert Einstein College of Medicine. He soon partnered with the established cardiology program at Montefiore Medical Center, which led to the award of a joint NIH research fellowship training grant and an NIH-supported program project grant, of which Sonnenblick served as the principal investigator. With James Scheuer and Leslie Leinwand, Sonnenblick developed the Einstein Cardiovascular Research Center and supported the creation of one of the United States' first molecular cardiology programs.

During his years as chief of cardiology at Einstein, Sonnenblick continued to train clinical cardiologists and investigators, and stimulated research in both the laboratory and the clinic. He and colleagues Steven Factor and Edward Kirk defined the nature of the border zone in myocardial infarction. He also authored publications on the effects of hypertension and diabetes on the myocardium, and established a research partnership with Piero Anversa's group at New York Medical College.

Sonnenblick served as a senior editor of Hurst's The Heart for four editions, and as co-editor, with Dr. Michael Lesh, of Progress in Cardiovascular Diseases. He was on the editorial board of most of the world's major cardiovascular journals. In 1996, upon stepping down as division director, he was named Chief Emeritus and the Edmond J. Safra Distinguished University Professor of Medicine at Einstein. He remained an active researcher and clinician until the end of his life. Over the course of his career, Sonnenblick trained more than 300 cardiologists and researchers, authored or co-authored over 650 articles, and made contributions to 16 textbooks on cardiovascular disease. He was also among the founding members of the Heart Failure Society of America.

== Death ==
Sonnenblick was diagnosed with esophageal cancer and continued to attend teaching conferences and make rounds in the coronary care unit and heart failure service at Einstein throughout the final year of his life, contributing what colleagues described as his characteristically brilliant clinical insights even as his illness progressed. He died on September 22, 2007 at his home in Darien, Connecticut.

== Personal life ==
In 1954, Sonnenblick married Linda Bland, the daughter of Chester Bland, businessman and president of Colt's Manufacturing Company between 1955 and 1958. The couple had three daughters. His oldest daughter, Emily Sonnenblick, is a radiologist at Mount Sinai Hospital in New York. She is married to cancer geneticist and oncologist Kenneth Offit. His youngest daughter, Charlotte Sonnenblick, is married to artist and author Adam Van Doren, grandson of Pulitzer Prize-winning poet, Mark Van Doren. Sonnenblick's middle daughter, Annie Sonnenblick, died of sepsis in 1984. Wesleyan University's annual Sonnenblick Lecture and Annie Sonnenblick Writing Award are named in her honor.

Sonnenblick was an enthusiastic sailor and owned a series of sailboats, which he would use regularly around Cape Anne and Cape Cod.

== Legacy ==
The idea that "the heart is a muscle" in a basic anatomical sense was not controversial in the early 1960s. What was very much unproven, and what Sonnenblick demonstrated, is that the heart behaves as a muscle, in the mechanical sense that Archibald Hill had established for skeletal muscle. Before Sonnenblick's studies, the dominant framework for understanding cardiac function was hemodynamic and hydraulic: the heart was understood as a pump, described by the Frank-Starling law. But there was no cellular mechanical explanation for what the law held. Sonnenblick showed that cardiac papillary muscle follows Hill's force-velocity equation, and that the Frank-Starling law is explained by exactly the same sarcomere-length and filament-overlap mechanism that governs skeletal muscle.

Sonnenblick had a long career but his scientific legacy rests on a foundational body of work completed largely before he turned thirty-five. The 1962 force-velocity paper and subsequent studies of sarcomere-length—what Braunwald described as his "two grand slam home runs"—are among the few scientific contributions of the 20th century that fundamentally reoriented cardiovascular science. By demonstrating that the contractile behavior of isolated cardiac muscle follows the same mechanical laws governing skeletal muscle—and by extending those findings to the intact ventricle—Sonnenblick supplied the physiological framework within which the modern concepts of preload, afterload, and contractility became clinically operational. His work supplied the theoretical justification for afterload reduction as a therapeutic strategy, which in turn laid the conceptual groundwork for the development and widespread adoption of ACE inhibitors in the treatment of heart failure and hypertension.
