= CNIB Chanchlani Global Vision Research Award =

The CNIB Chanchlani Global Vision Research Award is an annual global research award that promotes research to explore the causes of blindness and vision loss, as well as potential cures, treatments and preventions. The award of $25,000 is given to vision scientists around the world who have made a major, original contribution for advancement in above said fields.

The award was established in 2011 by Vasu and wife Jaya Chanchlani in collaboration with CNIB (Canadian National Institute for the Blind), the Toronto Netralya Lions Club and the Toronto Doctors Lions Club. The $500,000 endowment established with Mr. Chanchlani’s significant financial support, the awards promotes research of vision science and vision rehabilitation.

== Award recipients ==
- 2016 - Dr Robert Molday

Dr Molday is Professor of Biochemistry & Molecular Biology and Ophthalmology & Visual Sciences, University of British Columbia

- 2014 - Jayakrishna Ambati

Dr Ambati is Professor and Vice-Chair for Research of Ophthalmology and Founding Director of the Center for Advanced Vision Science at the University of Virginia.

- 2012 - Professor Hugh R. Taylor

Taylor is Melbourne Laureate Professor at the University of Melbourne and Chair of Indigenous Eye Health, where he was formerly Professor of Ophthalmology and department head and is founder of the Centre for Eye Research Australia. He is the Vice President of the International Agency for the Prevention of Blindness and Treasurer of the International Council of Ophthalmology.

== See also ==
- List of medicine awards
