= Journal of the American Medical Directors Association =

- Discipline: Geriatric medicine
- Language: English
- Edited by: Philip Sloane and Sheryl Zimmerman

Publication details
- History: 2000-present
- Publisher: Elsevier on behalf of the American Medical Directors Association
- Frequency: Monthly
- Impact factor: 7.802 (2021)

Standard abbreviations
- ISO 4: J. Am. Med. Dir. Assoc.

Indexing
- CODEN: JAMDC2
- ISSN: 1525-8610 (print); 1538-9375 (web)
- LCCN: 99008866 sn 99008866

Links
- Journal homepage; Online access; Online archive

The Journal of the American Medical Directors Association (JAMDA) is a peer-reviewed medical journal published by Elsevier twelve times a year as of January 2013 (9 times per year 2000–2012). It is the official journal of the American Medical Directors Association. The journal covers all aspects of long-term care and geriatrics. JAMDA's readership includes internists, family/general practitioners, nurses, rehabilitation therapists, researchers and persons interested in caring for older persons.

== Abstracting and indexing ==
The journal is abstracted and indexed in:

- Excerpta Medica
- MEDLINE/PubMed
- EMBASE
- Current Contents/Clinical Medicine
- CINAHL
- Science Citation Index Expanded

The Journal was placed as the most highly ranked of any of the clinical geriatric journals in 2012 with an impact factor of 5.302 and immediacy index of 1.343. The increase in the number of issues together with the online only publications has led to a major increase in the denominator for calculating the 2013 impact factor, which fell to 4.781 but still gave JAMDA the second highest impact factor of all the clinical geriatric journals. In 2013, JAMDA also had the highest immediacy index of 1.483 among all the clinical geriatric journals. In 2017, the journal's impact factor was 5.325.

== History ==
AMDA was established in 1978 by James Patee and herman Gruber near Hilton Head, Georgia. In 1988 it moved to Washington, DC. It has developed a Certified Medical Director program. It produces JAMDA (first known as the Annals of Long term Care, then renamed the Journal of the American Medical Directors Association in 2000. The first Editor-in-Chief was Dan Osterweil, MD. The 2nd Editor-in-Chief is John E. Morley, MB, BCh, Division of Geriatric Medicine, Saint Louis University School of Medicine, St. Louis, Missouri. The current Editors-in-Chief are Philip Sloane, MD, MPH and Sheryl Zimmerman, PhD, University of North Carolina, Chapel Hill, NC. The Journal has an international editorial board.

== Editors-in-Chief ==
- Dan Osterweil (2000-2006)
- John E. Morley (2007–2017)
- Philip Sloane and Sheryl Zimmerman (2018–Present)

Article Types JAMDA publishes the following types of articles and editorial content:

- Editorials
- Special Articles
- Updates from the AMDA Meeting
- Review Articles
- Original Study Articles
- Clinical Experience
- Brief Reports
- Quality Improvement in Long Term Care
- Long Term Care Around the Globe
- Controversies in Long Term Care
- Case Reports
- In the Trenches
- In Touch
- Letter to the Editor
- Book Reviews
