= Sarnoff Fellowship =

For medical students interested in cardiovascular research

The Sarnoff Cardiovascular Research Fellowship is a program for US medical students that offers one year of monetary support and a lifetime of academic support for those medical students interested in cardiovascular research. Stanley Sarnoff established the fellowship for medical students in 1979 and it would serve as a prototype for later programs such as the American Heart Association Student Research Scholarship program and the Howard Hughes Medical Institute NIH Research Scholars program, or cloisters program, which would not begin until 1984.

== Stanley Sarnoff ==
Dr. Sarnoff, a graduate of Princeton University and The Johns Hopkins University School of Medicine, was a scientist, entrepreneur and scholar who early in his career served as assistant professor of physiology at the Harvard University School of Public Health. For a decade he was Chief of the Laboratory of Cardiovascular Physiology at the National Heart Institute. He later founded Rodana Research Corporation and its successor, Survival Technology, Inc., a company today known as Meridian Medical Technologies, which manufactures medical devices. At Dr. Sarnoff's death in 1990, his will named The Sarnoff Foundation the principal beneficiary of his Estate, valued shortly after his death at nearly $30 million.

== Goals of the fellowship ==
Sarnoff based the program on his experience with Myron Weisfeldt, a young medical student in his lab, from which he established a set of simple rules for the fellowship: the medical student would leave school for one year, work in the laboratory of a prominent cardiovascular scientist conducting his own research and participate as if he were an independent researcher. At the conclusion of his year, the student would report his findings to his mentors. As the fellowship grew, students would attend a yearly meeting and present their findings to their peers and to the Sarnoff Cardiovascular research community of mentors, advisors and past fellows. A major emphasis of these meetings was on Dr Sarnoff's question, "Did you have fun?"

Sarnoff wanted the fellows to be caught up in the joys of scientific research and discovery. The year was intended to expose students to the rewards of scientific research but it was more than that; it was a way to encourage the students to examine other ways of thinking, other career paths. No project was a failure if the experiment failed because failure opened the way to other findings. If the student learned something about himself and his choices then he had succeeded.

== How the fellowship works ==
As a junior fellow, the student is given funding to conduct a year of cardiovascular research at a laboratory outside their home institution (which should be a medical school in the United States). This includes a stipend as well as funds for traveling to interview with laboratories across the country, for moving expenses, for health insurance and computer equipment, and for financial support to attend meetings and conferences.

The organization gives each junior fellow an established cardiovascular researcher to be their mentor. Mentors help students select and integrate into an appropriate lab; they will also monitor the student's research experience during the fellowship year. After completion of the research year, the student becomes a Senior Fellow and is funded to attend the Annual Scientific Meeting for the duration of their life. Career guidance and research mentorship continues to be available from the student's Sarnoff mentor, the Sarnoff scientific board and the greater Sarnoff Community. Additional research funding through the Scholars Program is available to Senior Fellows.

== Awardee Profile ==
Sarnoff Fellowships are awarded based upon the student's research interests and research proposal. Although many applicants have had a wide array of research experiences, the fellowship program is also interested in fostering students who have had none but who are interested in cardiovascular research.

Over 300 fellows and 30 scholars have completed the program, many of whom choose to pursue academic research or to pursue their research within industry or business. It remains a small and tight knit community linked by the members' interest in cardiovascular research. Of those fellows who choose to practice medicine, the majority refer to their time as a Sarnoff Fellow as some of the most rewarding of their training and the alumni organization exists "with sincere thanks to Stanley Sarnoff for his unconditional gift."

== Some Notable Alumni ==
- Myron Weisfeldt, MD (medical student who trained with Dr. Sarnoff; basis for establishment of Fellowship), Chair of Medicine, Johns Hopkins School of Medicine.
- John McVicar, MD (1980-81 Sarnoff Fellow), Director of Liver Transplantation, University of California, Davis Medical Center.
- Richard D. White, MD (1980-81 Sarnoff Fellow), chairman, Department of Radiology, Ohio State University.
- Thom Rooke, MD (1980-81 Sarnoff Fellow), Director, Gonda Vascular Center, Krehbiel Professor of Vascular Medicine, Mayo Clinic
- Richard Page, MD (1982-83 Sarnoff Fellow, 1987-1989 Sarnoff Scholar), Chair of Department of Medicine at the University of Wisconsin School of Medicine and Public Health. President-Elect of the Heart Rhythm Society.
- Baron Hamman, MD (1985-86 Sarnoff Fellow), Chairman of Cardiothoracic Surgery, Baylor University Medical Center.
- Geoffrey Gurtner, MD (1987-88 Sarnoff Fellow, 2000-2002 Sarnoff Scholar), Johnson & Johnson Professor of Plastic Surgery, Associate Chairman for Research, Dept of Surgery, Stanford University School of Medicine.
- Leslie Cooper, MD (1988-89 Sarnoff Fellow), chair, Cardiovascular Medicine, Mayo Clinic-Florida. President of Myocarditis Foundation.
- Andy Plump, MD, PhD (1989-90 Sarnoff Fellow, 1998-2000 Sarnoff Scholar), Chief Medical and Scientific Officer, Takeda Pharmaceutical Company.
- Michael Wallace, MD, MPH (1990-91 Sarnoff Fellow), Vice Chairman of Medicine, Mayo Clinic.
- James Chang, MD (1991-92 Sarnoff Fellow). Chief of Plastic and Reconstructive Surgery, Stanford University School of Medicine.

== See also ==
- List of medicine awards
