= Amda Seyon (disambiguation) =

Amda Seyon I was Emperor of Ethiopia from 1314 to 1344.

Amda Seyon ("Pillar of Zion") may also refer to:

- Amda Seyon II, Emperor of Ethiopia in 1494
- Amda Seyon (usurper), self-proclaimed as Emperor of Ethiopia in 1707
