= Vasu Chanchlani =

Co-founder of the Sigma Group of Companies, founding member of Canada India Foundation

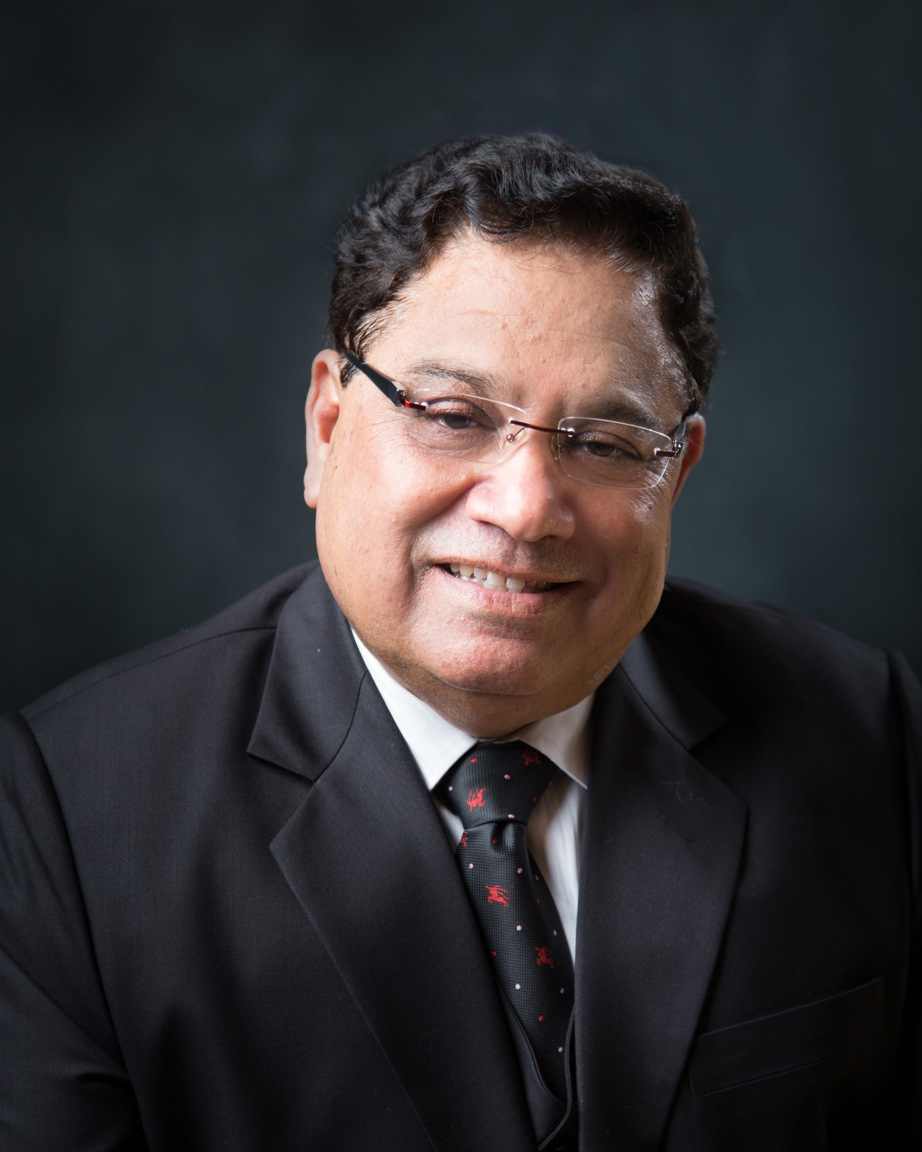
- Born: 10 July 1952; Bhopal, India
- Died: 7 September 2014 (aged 62); Toronto, Ontario, Canada
- Education: Indian Institute of Technology Kanpur; University of Toronto
- Known for: Entrepreneurship, philanthropy, transnationalism

Vasu Chanchlani (born July 1, 1952 – September 7, 2014) was an Indian-Canadian serial entrepreneur, philanthropist and trans-nations builder. He is co-founder of the Sigma Group of Companies and a founding member of the Canada India Foundation. He is also an investor in dozens of companies globally consisting of start-ups and turn-arounds. He is best known for his efforts towards improving Canada-India relations through his philanthropic activities and engagement with the Indian Diaspora to serve bilateral interests of both Canada and India. Most recently, Vasu was awarded the Top 25 Canadian Immigrants award by the Canadian Immigrant magazine (a Toronto Star Publication). On January 9, 2014, his excellency shri Pranab Mukherjee, President of the Republic of India, conferred the Pravasi Bharatiya Samman Award (PBSA), the highest honour bestowed on non-resident Indians, by the Government of India.

== Education and early life ==
Chanchlani was born in Bhopal (M.P), India, to an upper-middle-class family. After completing high school in Bhopal, he went on to receive degrees from the Indian Institute of Technology Kanpur (Masters in Industrial and Management Engineering), and an MBA from the Rotman School of Management, University of Toronto, Canada. He began his career with Tata Consultancy Services in India, and moved to Canada in 1979. He began working with Nortel, eventually becoming the Senior Manager of Information Services before starting his own business.

== Philanthropy ==
Vasu Chanchlani established his private Canadian charitable foundation, the Chanchlani Foundation in early 2000s. Chanchlani's philanthropic efforts are guided by the motto to "inspire people and reward global excellence". He has made serious financial contributions for supporting path-breaking health and public policy research as well as nurturing entrepreneurship and leveraging New Canadians’ success and influence for deeper and gainful engagement between Canada and India.

=== Canada India Foundation ===
Chanchlani has made an endowment of one million dollars to create the CIF Chanchlani Global Indian Award, an award that recognizes innovation and global leadership in the Indian diaspora. Past recipients of this honour include Ratan Tata and Sam Pitroda. Chanchlani also works with the foundation to enhance its engagement with Indian leaders such as former President A.P.J. Abdul Kalam, Minister of Human Resource Development Kapil Sibal, economic policy-maker Montek Singh Ahluwalia, and former Under-Secretary-General of the United Nations Dr. Shashi Tharoor.

=== The Centre of South Asian Civilization: University of Toronto ===
Chanchlanis have made a gift of $2 million to create the Centre for South Asian Civilization at the University of Toronto Mississauga to broaden the study of traditional subjects to enhance the understanding and include active engagement of South Asian communities.

=== University of Waterloo ===
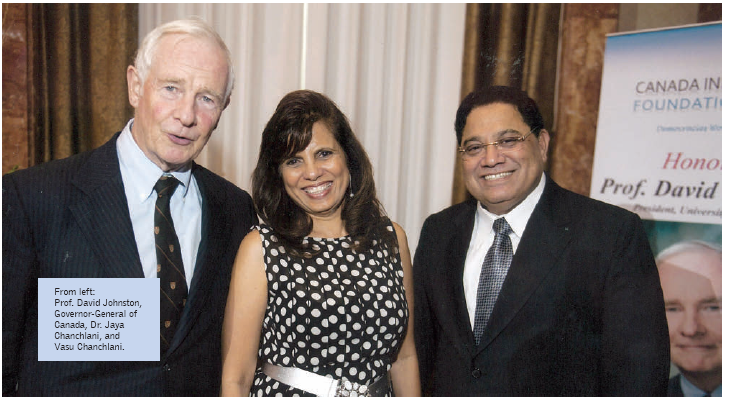
Chanchlani (right) and his wife with His Excellency Dr. David Johnston (President of University of Waterloo at the time) at a Canada India Foundation Luncheon

Vasu is a seed contributor to the ‘India Initiative’, a joint undertaking between The University of Waterloo and the Canada India Foundation for the advancement of Canada's research capacity in studying the politics, economy and social conditions of contemporary India, and the bilateral relationship between the countries. The initiative's planned $10 million endowment will fund endowed CIF Chairs for Waterloo faculty members, Visiting Chairs for India scholars, CIF Fellows, graduate student fellowships, and engagement with researchers and faculty at the Centre for International Governance Innovation and the Balsillie School of International Affairs. The initiative was made possible in collaboration with CIF's National Convenor Aditya Jha, Waterloo's Dean Ken Coates and others.

=== McMaster University ===
Vasu and his wife Dr. Jaya Chanchlani have set up a $10 million fund (through $1 million seed) to set up the Chanchlani Research Centre at McMaster University. This centre will encourage scientists to find environmental and genetic causes of cardio vascular diseases widely prevalent within South Asians and those of South Asian origin in Canada. He has also endowed $250,000 at McMaster to give every year Chanchlani Global Health Research Award along with $25,000 for the best global research for heart and diabetes among South Asians.

=== Saluting fallen Canadian Armed Forces ===
In September 2010, Chanchlani along with fellow businessmen Ajit Someshwar and Bhupinder Khalsa donated a maple-leaf-shaped monument to the Canadian Armed Forces for their exemplary service as global peace-keepers. The unveiling ceremony was attended by a large number of Canadian Armed Forces personnel in their ceremonial attire, as well as top leaders including defence minister Peter Mackay, opposition leader Michael Ignatieff, and finance minister Jim Flaherty.

=== The Canadian National Institute for the Blind ===
Chanchlani has set up the CNIB Chanchlani Global Vision Research Award to recognize the best researcher in the field of vision care and vision enablement, worldwide. The $100,000 endowment and award was announced at a special reception in Toronto on April 3, 2011.

=== Others ===
Vasu has sponsored a student home (through AIM For Seva) in Hoshangabad, India for poor students from surrounding 25 villages to stay there. According to the website, 149 children have benefited from this hostel.

== Awards and recognition ==
- Pravasi Bharatiya Samman Award, 2014
- Lifetime Achievement Award 2011, Global Indian Origin
- South Asian Person of the Year Award 2010 - Mid Week
- Entrepreneur of Year Award 2011 - Voice Weekly
- 30 most Influential Indo Canadians, Rediff India Abroad magazine's Power List (published September 2009)
- Winner, Top 25 Canadian Immigrants 2010
- Ernst & Young Entrepreneur of the Year - Finalist Award for 2001
- Indo-Canada Chamber of Commerce Technology Achievement Award for 2002
- Co-Founder & Board Member, Canada India Foundation
- Desi News Grant's Community Achievers Awards (2009)

== See also ==
- Indo-Canadians in Toronto
