= Joon Yun =

American physician (born 1967)

- Born: Anthony Joonkyoo Yun; 1967 (age 58–59); Seoul, South Korea
- Education: Harvard University (BA); Duke University (MD)
- Occupations: Physician; President of Palo Alto Investors; Founder of Palo Alto Institute
- Website: Official website

Anthony Joonkyoo "Joon" Yun (born 1967) is an American physician, hedge-fund manager and investor.

== Early life, education and early career ==
Yun was born in Seoul, South Korea. He attended St. Albans School, a private all-boys school in Washington, D.C. He went to Harvard College where he obtained a Bachelor of Arts degree in biology in 1990. He obtained his Doctor of Medicine degree from Duke University School of Medicine in 1994 and completed a fellowship and residency in radiology from Stanford Hospital in 2000. After his residency, he served on the clinical faculty at the same institution from 2000 until 2006.

== Career ==
Yun began his career as a healthcare analyst in 1998 at Palo Alto Investors, LLC, a hedge fund based in Palo Alto, California, with $1 billion assets under management invested in healthcare. Palo Alto Investors was founded in 1989 by William Edwards, the son of venture capitalist Bill Edwards, one of the original Silicon Valley venture capitalists. Yun has been responsible for healthcare investments for Palo Alto Investors since 1998 and in 2008 was elected president of the firm.

== Charities ==
Yun is also the creator and sponsor of the $1 Million Palo Alto Longevity Prize, which was launched in 2014, an incentive prize to encourage teams from all over the world to compete in an all-out effort to "hack the code" that regulates our health and lifespan. Joon Yun is the principal of Yun Family Foundation. In November 2019, the Yun Family Foundation started an initiative to target the growing attention inequality.
