= AMDA – The Society for Post-Acute and Long-Term Care Medicine =

AMDA – The Society for Post-Acute and Long-Term Care Medicine, commonly called AMDA and previously called AMDA – Dedicated to Long Term Care Medicine and American Medical Directors Association, is a medical specialty professional organization with a focus on providing long-term care.

== Work ==
The society publishes the Journal of the American Medical Directors Association.

An affiliate of AMDA – Dedicated to Long Term Care Medicine, (Note: "AMDA - Dedicated to Long Term Care Medicine" is the name adopted by the former American Medical Directors Association. Despite its appearance as a slogan, this is the group's official name.) the American Medical Directors Certification Program (AMDCP) accredits Certified Medical Directors (CMD) in long-term care. The AMDCP's mission is “to recognize and advance physician leadership and excellence in medical direction throughout the long-term care continuum through certification, thereby enhancing quality of care.” The presence of a CMD in nursing homes results in a 15% improvement in quality scores compared to those without CMDs. The AMDCP is the sole organization to accredit Certified Medical Directors in long-term care, and has certified more than 2,700 CMDs since the founding of the program in 1991.

== Certification process ==
Applications to the American Board of Post-Acute and Long-Term Care Medicine (formerly, American Medical Directors Certification Program) are reviewed twice annually. To begin the certification process applicants must be a physician medical director at a long-term care facility, and have completed a post-graduate training program accredited by the U.S. Accreditation Council for Graduate Medical Education or American Osteopathic Association, or a Canadian Royal College of Physicians and Surgeons or College of Family Physicians accredited post-graduate training program. Certification is earned with competence in clinical medicine and medical management in long-term care, after completing educational requirements. Continuing medical education in both clinical and leadership areas is a requirement to retain certification, as well as to recertify in the future. CMDs must recertify after six years.

Certified Medical Director is a certification offered by the American Board of Post-Acute and Long-Term Care Medicine (ABPLM), an affiliate of AMDA – the Society for Post-Acute and Long-Term Care Medicine (AMDA). (Note: "AMDA – the Society for Post-Acute and Long-Term Care Medicine" is the name adopted by the former American Medical Directors Association. Despite its appearance as a slogan, this is the group's official name.) The certification indicates a degree of expertise in long-term care, and is aimed at medical directors of nursing homes and similar long-term care facilities.

=== History ===
The AMDCP was started in 1991, following the release of Role and Responsibilities of the Medical Director in the Nursing Home, a document supported by the AMDA's House of Delegates. AMDA recognized the need for a certification program based on the Nursing Home Reform Act of 1987. Credentials of a Certified Medical Director include efficiently acting in clinical and managerial roles while overseeing the long-term care interdisciplinary team.

=== Impact ===
According to a 2009 study, nursing homes with AMDA certified CMDs have a 15% higher quality improvement score than those without CMDs. The AMDCP is the only organization to accredit Certified Medial Directors in Long Term Care, and has certified more than 2,700 CMDs since the founding of the program in 1991. The program is accredited by the Accreditation Council for Continuing Medical Education.

== Medical Director of the Year Award ==
The Medical Director of the Year Award (MDOY) is given annually by the AMDA Foundation, an affiliate of AMDA. Nominations are accepted annually and reviewed by a Selection Committee. Recipients are awarded at AMDA's annual symposium, Long Term Care Medicine.

Recipients include:

- 2012: Noel DeBacker, MD, CMD
- 2011: Sabine von Preyss-Friedman, MD, CMD
- 2010: Robert Schreiber, MD, CMD
- 2009: Rebecca L. Ferrini MD, MPH, CMD
- 2008: J. Kenneth Brubaker], MD, CMD
- 2007: Timothy Malloy, MD, CMD

== See also ==
- American Board of Post-Acute and Long-Term Care Medicine
- List of medicine awards
