= Canada India Foundation =

Non-profit organisation in Canada

- Established: 2007
- Headquarters: 5160 Explorer Drive, Unit #1, Mississauga, Ontario, L4W 4T7, Canada
- Location: Toronto, Vancouver, Ottawa, Canada
- Chairperson: Ritesh Malik
- National Convener: Pankaj Dave
- Co-convener: Sanjay Makkar
- Website: Canada India Foundation

The Canada India Foundation is a Canadian non-profit organisation established in 2007. The main stated objective of CIF comprises promoting Canada–India relations through their active intervention in public policy, which would cover domestic policies and bilateral issues affecting the Indo-Canadian community, including issues such as culture, education, trade and investment, immigration, diplomatic, political, and strategic relations.

== Origin ==
The idea of an organization that would harness the collective influence of the Indo-Canadian community and Canadian friends of India to promote the development of public policies aimed at stronger ties between Canada and India, was mooted by a number of prominent Indo-Canadians based in Greater Toronto Area (GTA), in 2007. The discussion resulted in the incorporation of Canada India Foundation, a non-profit corporation, whose membership would be based on invitation and include industrialists, business leaders, senior executives and top tier professionals, with track record of achievements as well as passion for Canada-India ties. Its first initiatives were the organization of a Gala with Canada's prime minister Stephen Harper and India's former president Dr. Abdul Kalam as chief guests and the creation of the CIF Global Indian Award. Initial members of the Foundation came from the Greater Toronto and Greater Vancouver areas, with the objective to have representation in all provinces of Canada, and also to have an Indian presence.

== Mandate ==
Canada India Foundation has taken a leadership role in fostering support for stronger bilateral relations between Canada and India, greater engagement of the Indo-Canadian community in Canadian politics and public policy and increasing awareness of the changing face of India.

1) CIF works to foster stronger bi-lateral relations between Canada and India. Through active participation in the public policy debate and active engagement with Parliamentarians, CIF positions the need for a strategic partnership between Canada and India as critical to Canada's future

2) CIF works towards raising the profile of Indo-Canadian community by facilitating:

       - Participation by qualified members of the community in the policy-making and the legislative process,
       - Engagement with federal and provincial legislators in areas such as immigration, professional accreditation and security
       - increased representation of the community within crown agencies, government boards and judicial and quasi-judicial tribunals

3) CIF takes an active role in increasing the awareness of Canadians about the changing face of India, and the promotion of Canada's interest in India.

== Governance ==
CIF is managed by an executive team that is selected by the board of governors. The governors appoint officers of the corporation, namely chair, vice-chair, national convener, treasurer and secretary. The chair and National Convener in consultation with the rest of the board are responsible for establishing the directions of the organizations and approving initiatives for any year. All operational aspects of the foundation are managed by the executive director, appointed by the board. The board is elected for a 2-year term. The Executive Team appointed in 2018 comprises Anil Shah (Chair), Satish Thakkar (National Convener), Pankaj Dave (Co-Convener), Rupesh Kapadia (Treasurer), and Vijay Sastry (Secretary).

The following is the list of chairs and national conveners who have served CIF since its inception:

2007-2009 Chair: Surjit Babra; National Convenor: Ajit Someshwar

2009-2011 Chair: Ramesh Chotai; National Convenor: Aditya Jha

2011-2013 Chair: Barj Dhahan; National Convenor: Rahul Shastri

2011-2015 Chair: V.I. "Lucky" Lakshmanan; National Convenor: Laj Prasher

2015-2018 Chair: Ajit Someshwar; National Convenor: Anil Shah

2018 -2020 Chair: Anil Shah; National Convenor: Satish Thakkar National Co-Convenor: Pankajkumar Dave

2020 - 2023 Chair: Satish Thakkar; National Convenor: Ritesh Malik National Co-Convenor: Sunita Vyas

2023 - 2024 Chair: Ritesh Malik; National Convenor: Sunita Vyas National Co-Convenor: Chetan Handa

2024 - Chair: Ritesh Malik; National Convenor: Pankaj Dave National Co-Convenor: Sanjay Makkar

== Initiatives ==
As a public policy organization, CIF has engaged in dialogue with leaders in the Government to understand the policy perspectives of the Government and to provide input where appropriate. CIF has met and held discussions with Canadian and Indian national and regional ministers, the Canada India Inter-parliamentary Friendship Group, High Commissioners of Canada in India and India in Canada and others in public and private sector. CIF was privileged to organize three visits by India's former president, Dr. A.P.J. Abdul Kalam, including a meeting with Canada's prime minister Stephen Harper. CIF Members have accompanied Prime Minister Harper on both his delegations to India, in 2009 and 2012.

CIF instituted the first Award of its kind to honour one individual of Indian origin, whose accomplishments make the entire Indian diaspora proud. The Canada India Foundation ("CIF") Global Indian Award, which carries a cash prize of $50,000 towards a charity of the recipient's choice, has been presented to Sam Pitroda, Tulsi Tanti, Ratan Tata, Deepak Chopra, N.R. Narayana Murthy and Stephen Harper. Both Canada's then Prime Minister Stephen Harper and India's then President Abdul Kalam were honoured guests at CIF's first Global Indian Award Gala. In addition, CIF and its Board of Governors members have helped establish and support India-focused studies in Canadian universities.

CIF organized two visits by Dr. Kalam to Canada, in 2008 and 2010. A compilation of his talks, titled "Prosperity and Peace for the Twenty-First Century", was published in 2012 by CIF.

== Canada India Forums ==
One of Canada India Foundation's main initiatives is the organization of theme based Canada India Forums, highlighting specific sectors of opportunity for Canada and India to collaborate, both in trade and in non-trade related areas such as research, social policies etc. To-date, Canada India Foundation has organized 4 Forums:

Canada India Energy Forum (2009) - Toronto, Canada

Canada India Mining Forum (2010) - Toronto, Canada

Canada India Agriculture and Food Processing Forum (2012) - Vancouver/Saskatoon, Canada

Canada India Infrastructure Forum (2014) - Ottawa/Toronto, Canada

Canada India Healthcare Summit (2015) - Toronto, Canada

Canada India Foundation Higher Education Forum (2018) - Toronto, Canada

Canada India Foundation Higher Education Forum And India Mission (2019) - New Delhi/Gandhinagar, India

Canada India Healthcare Summit (21 May 2021) - Toronto, Canada

The Forums bring senior public and private stakeholders from both Canada and India together to dialogue and make policy recommendations that can be implemented by the two countries for mutual benefit.

== CIF Global Indian Award ==
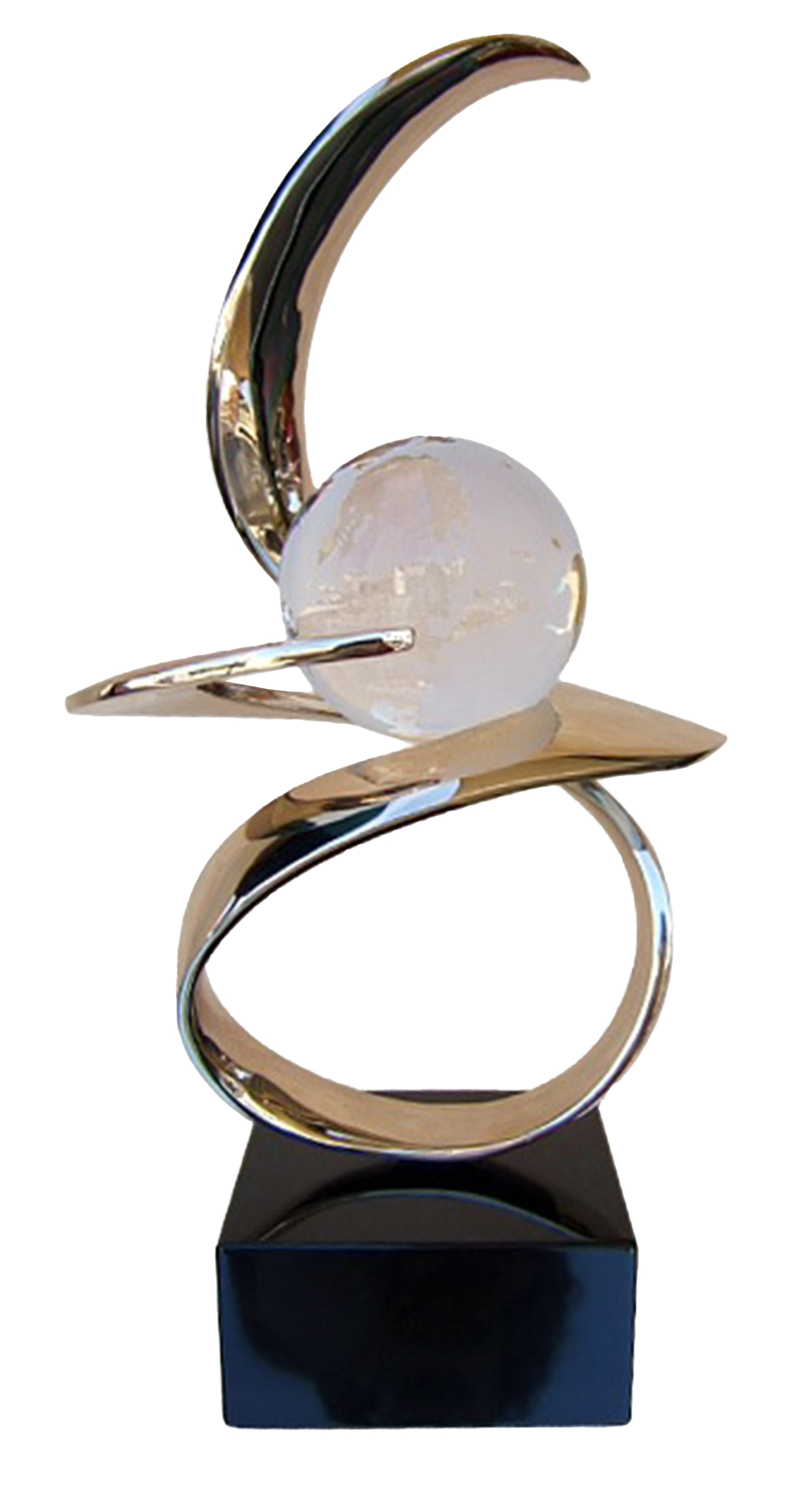
CIF Global Indian Award

The CIF Global Indian Award is an annual award for an Indian or person of Indian origin. It was established in 2008 by the Canada India Foundation to recognize excellence and celebrate achievement in the global Indian diaspora. The award is presented to a recipient who has demonstrated global leadership, vision and professional excellence that has made all people of Indian origin extremely proud of their Indian heritage. The award is in the form of a trophy accompanied with donations of $50,000.00 to approved charities in the name of the award recipient. Several members of Canada India Foundation also make contributions towards each year's Award amount.

=== Award recipients ===
- 2025 - Sadhguru, founder, Isha Foundation
- 2023 - Sudha Murty, chairman, Murty Trust
- 2022 - Anil Agarwal, chairman, Vedanta Group
- 2019 - Hon. Stephen Harper, former prime minister of Canada
- 2018 - Sparsh Shah, Child Prodigy - Rapper and motivational speaker
- 2017 - Swami Ramdev, Yoga Guru, founder - Patanjali Yogpeeth, Patanjali Ayurved
- 2016 - Subhash Chandra, chairman, Essel Group
- 2014 - Narayana Murthy, Co-founder and former chairman, Infosys
- 2012 - Deepak Chopra, Alternative medicine advocate, public speaker, writer
- 2010 - Ratan Tata, chairman, Tata Group
- 2009 - Tulsi Tanti, Founder & CEO, Suzlon
- 2008 - Sam Pitroda, chairman, India's National Knowledge Commission

Prime Minister of Canada Stephen Harper and former Indian president Dr. Abdul Kalam presented the inaugural CIF Global Indian Award in 2008.
