= Sarnoff =

Sarnoff is a surname. Notable people with the surname include:

- Ann Sarnoff (born c. 1962), American businesswoman
- Arthur Sarnoff (1912–2000), American artist
- David Sarnoff (1891–1971), Belarusian-born American radio and television technology pioneer and businessman
- Dorothy Sarnoff (1914–2008), American operatic soprano, musical theatre actress and image consultant
- Elizabeth Sarnoff, American television writer and producer
- Robert W. Sarnoff, American businessman
- Sarnoff A. Mednick (1928–2015)
- Stanley Sarnoff (died 1990), surgeon and inventor of medical devices
