= Stanley Sarnoff =

American cardiologist (1917–1990)

Stanley J. Sarnoff (April 5, 1917 – May 23, 1990) was an American doctor who produced over 200 papers and 60 patents during his long career. His work included the development of such widely used devices as the "auto-injector," which included the AtroPen, which was filled with Atropine Hydrochloride as an anti-nerve-gas antidote for military use; the LidoPen, which was filled with Lidocaine hydrochloride, for cardiac patients, the EpiPen, containing Epinephrine, for people whose allergies cause anaphylaxis, and the 24-hour cardiac monitor. In addition to his own work, he was devoted to philanthropy and, though the creation of The Stanley J Sarnoff Endowment for Cardiovascular Science, he has helped to inspire medical students and cardiology fellows from around the country to pursue cardiovascular research.

== Early life ==
A graduate of the Peddie School, Sarnoff received his undergraduate degree from Princeton University (1938) and his medical degree from Johns Hopkins University School of Medicine (1942). Although he was interested in research as a medical student, Sarnoff was strongly encouraged to become a cardiac surgeon by his father, Jacob Sarnoff, who was a prominent surgeon of the time. While Sarnoff was assisting his father in the operating room, he made observations which challenged conventional thoughts on cardiac physiology. The observations he made on that day became the foundation of his bench research and changed the way cardiology was practiced. After his residency, Sarnoff completed post graduate training at Bellevue Hospital (New York), Beth Israel Hospital (Boston), Mount Sinai Hospital (New York), and Harvard Medical School.

== Early career ==
After his training, Sarnoff spent a dozen years at the Harvard School of Public Health (1948–1960) as an assistant professor of physiology and he became chief of the cardiovascular physiology laboratory at the National Heart Institute (1954). At the NIH, Sarnoff published some of his most renowned papers in cardiac physiology. Sarnoff's first paper on ventricular function, published with Erik Berglund, was "Starling's Law of the Heart." After becoming chief of the cardiovascular physiology lab at NIH, he initiated a number of studies on valvular heart disease. A succession of prominent cardiac investigators work in Sarnoff's lab, including Eugene Braunwald, Joseph Gilmore, Jere Mitchell, William John Powell Jr, Edmund Sonnenblick, Andrew Wallace and Myron Weisfeldt. Sarnoff's experience mentoring Myron Weisfeldt, who was then a young medical student from Johns Hopkins, spurred him to begin his philanthropic efforts toward medical students.

After suffering a serious heart attack himself, Sarnoff left the NIH. He and his wife LoLo began Rodana Research Corporation followed by Survival Technology Inc (STI), a publicly traded company registered with NASDAQ. Survival Technology manufactured his auto-injectors. Although the auto-injectors were first developed for military use to administer a nerve gas antidote, Sarnoff used them to immediately treat heart attacks so that the patient could survive until a medical team could arrive.

== Founding the Sarnoff Fellowship Program ==
As STI prospered financially, Sarnoff was inspired to encourage young medical students to pursue cardiovascular research. He believed that a medical student could conduct his own research, defend his findings and participate in the work of the lab as a full-time scientist thereby allowing the student to yield great benefit from the lab environment. After discussions with Ellis Rolett, the chair of cardiology at Dartmouth, in 1979 Sarnoff agreed to meet four young medical students. He was so impressed by their enthusiasm that within one month Sarnoff writes a $10,000 check to Dartmouth to fund the first fellow.

It was a revolutionary action. At that time, there were no other well known fellowships for medical students. In fact, the Sarnoff fellowship would form the basis for programs such as the AHA Student Research Scholarship program and the Howard Hughes NIH Research Scholars program, or cloisters program, which would not begin until 1984. For Sarnoff, what began with a single medical student fellow in 1979 spread to hundreds more.

Based on his experience with Weisfeldt, Sarnoff established a set of simple rules for the fellowship: the medical student would leave school for one year, work in the laboratory of a prominent cardiovascular scientist conducting his own research and participate as if he were an independent researcher. At the conclusion of his year, the student would report his findings to his mentors. As the fellowship grew, students would attend a yearly meeting and present their findings to their peers and to the Sarnoff Cardiovascular research community of mentors, advisors and past fellows. A major emphasis of these meetings was on Dr Sarnoff's question, "Did you have fun?"

Sarnoff wanted the fellows to be caught up in the joys of scientific research and discovery. The year was intended to expose students to the rewards of scientific research but it was more than that; it was a way to encourage the students to examine other ways of thinking, other career paths. No project was a failure if the experiment failed because failure opened the way to other findings. If the student learned something about himself and his choices than he had succeeded. Alan Kono, the first Sarnoff Fellow, began a year study with Weisfeldt, who was one of Sarnoff's first students, at Johns Hopkins thus bringing the fellowship full circle.

== Growth of the Fellowship Program ==
As the fellowship grew, scientists with whom Stanley had collaborated suggested promising candidates and they were selected as Fellows. Early meetings were small gatherings at his home and at nearby hotels. The weekends were filled with students' presentations but also were informal gatherings and finished up with an afternoon of tennis at Stanley's home. The program was formalized in 1981 with the formation of The Stanley J. Sarnoff Endowment for Cardiovascular Science, Inc., a public charity. Many of the sponsors of the early Fellows were invited to serve on the Endowment's Board of Directors.

Over the next 10 years, endowment developed the existing research guidelines and practices. Through the remaining years of his life, Sarnoff and sponsors from a handful of medical schools reviewed and selected fellowship recipients. The endowment established a scientific board consisting of sponsors (researchers who submit students for the fellowship), preceptors (researchers who accept students into their lab), current and former students, and supporters of the Endowments mission from the academic community. Its primary charge is to select Fellows and to oversee the Fellow's year in the lab.

A scholarship program was established to fund the post-doctoral research careers of MD cardiovascular scientists. Over 300 fellows and 30 scholars have completed the program, many of whom choose to pursue academic research or to pursue their research within industry or business. Many who practice medicine, point to their days as a Sarnoff Fellow as their most rewarding years in training and the alumni organization exists "with sincere thanks to Stanley Sarnoff for his unconditional gift."

== Final years ==
Sarnoff died in 1990, awaiting a heart transplant. He was survived by his wife LoLo. At the last Annual Meeting during his lifetime, which was a few weeks prior to his death, many of the Fellows and their mentors gathered by the telephone to speak a few words to him and to thank him for the influence he had on their lives.

His will named The Sarnoff Foundation the principal beneficiary of his Estate, valued shortly after his death at nearly $30 million. The endowment continues to this day. Each year hundreds of people attend the Sarnoff Annual Meeting where a new set of young cardiovascular researchers is presented.
