= Foundation Fighting Blindness =

American research organization

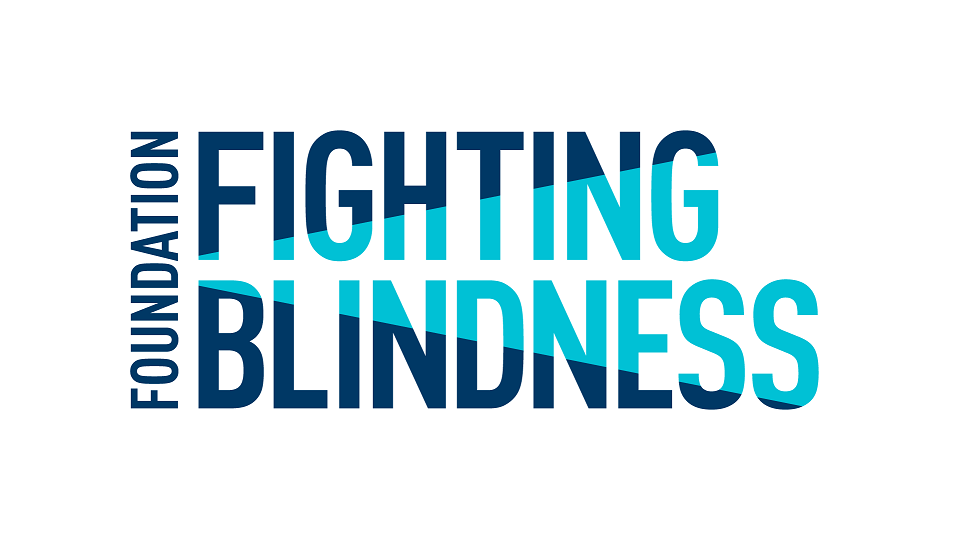
- Formation: 1971
- Type: Non-Profit
- Headquarters: Columbia, Maryland
- Website: fightblindness.org

The mission of the Foundation Fighting Blindness is to fund research that will lead to the prevention, treatment and cures for the entire spectrum of retinal degenerative diseases, including retinitis pigmentosa, macular degeneration, Usher syndrome, Stargardt disease and related conditions. These diseases, which affect more than 10 million Americans and millions more throughout the world, often lead to severe vision loss or complete blindness.

The Foundation Fighting Blindness was founded as the National Retinitis Pigmentosa Foundation in 1971 by Gordon and Lulie Gund, Bernard and Beverly Berman, and other dedicated leaders to find cures for retinal degenerations at a time when very little was known about those vision-robbing diseases. Blind from retinitis pigmentosa, Gund is Chairman of the Foundation Fighting Blindness and Chief Executive Officer and Chairman of Gund Investment Corporation. He is a former majority owner of the Cleveland Cavaliers (National Basketball Association) and was co-founder and part owner of the San Jose Sharks (National Hockey League). Berman died in 1996.

Through private individual contributions, corporate philanthropy and community-based fundraising activities, the Foundation has raised more than $500 million since its founding and is the largest non-governmental source of research funds for inherited retinal degenerative diseases.

== Diseases studied ==
Foundation-funded scientists at institutions throughout the world conduct research for the entire spectrum of retinal degenerative diseases including: retinitis pigmentosa, macular degeneration, Usher syndrome, Stargardt disease, Best disease, choroideremia, retinoschisis, Leber congenital amaurosis, Bardet–Biedl syndrome, cone dystrophy, cone-rod dystrophy, rod–cone dystrophy, achromatopsia, Refsum disease, and other rare retinal degenerative diseases.

== Research and clinical trials ==
The Foundation funds research in a number of scientific areas including: genetics, gene therapy, nutrition, stem cells, and pharmaceutical therapies.

After decades of Foundation-funded research, several promising treatments have moved into human clinical trials, including a landmark gene therapy human study for Leber congenital amaurosis, which has enabled more than 40 children and young adults who were virtually blind to read several lines on an eye chart and see in dimly lit settings. This success paved the way for the development of gene therapies now in clinical trials to treat a wide range of other retinal conditions, including Stargardt disease, Usher syndrome, and age-related macular degeneration.

Valproic acid, a drug that is FDA-approved to treat epilepsy, has shown promise for preserving vision in people with certain forms of retinitis pigmentosa. The Foundation has launched a human trial to test this drug and, if effective, move it quickly out to patients who need it.

Foundation-funded researchers are using stem cells derived from a variety of sources, including a person's own skin, to create healthy retinal cells that can potentially restore vision. Stem cell treatments hold great promise for people with advanced vision loss.

The Foundation is also funding clinical trials of a tiny innovative capsule that is inserted into the eye to slow vision loss from a variety of retinal degenerative diseases.

== Foundation Fighting Blindness Clinical Research Institute ==
The Foundation Fighting Blindness Clinical Research Institute works to accelerate the translation of laboratory-based research into clinical trials for treatments and cures of retinal degenerative diseases. As a support organization and the translational arm of the Foundation Fighting Blindness, it aims to develop a bridge between scientific, clinical, governmental, pharmaceutical and financial communities to advance clinical trials of sight-saving treatments and therapies. The FFB Clinical Research Institute invests funds to support Phase I and Phase II clinical trials to expedite the commercialization of treatments for conditions such as retinitis pigmentosa, macular degeneration, Usher syndrome and the entire spectrum of retinal diseases, and also provides assistance to the management of clinical trials and subsequent commercialization.

== Grants ==
The Foundation Fighting Blindness currently funds more than 120 grants, including the modules of 14 Centers. The research projects of these grants are conducted by research investigators at more than 70 Institutions, Eye Hospitals and Universities. In addition to funding researchers within the United States, Foundation funding extends internationally including laboratories in Canada, England, France, Germany, Italy, Israel, China, and the Netherlands.

== Fundraising and public education ==
The Foundation has nearly 50 volunteer-led chapters across the U.S. These volunteers raise funds for research, increase public awareness, and provide support to their communities. Through its communications and public health outreach programs, the Foundation educates individuals affected with retinal disease and their families about research developments, clinical trials, and coping with low vision.

In addition to grants and individual and corporate gifts, the Foundation hosts a series of fundraising events across the country, including VisionWalks, Dining in the Dark dinners, and Visionary Awards galas. As promising treatments move into critical human studies, the need for research funding is greater than ever before.

== VisionWalk ==
VisionWalk is the national signature fundraising event of the Foundation Fighting Blindness that also acts as a celebration of the Fighting Blindness community. Occurring every fall in 36 locations, participants join teams and fund raise in the month leading up to the event. The event itself is a 5k walk to fund raise for research sponsored by FFB, as well as to raise awareness of low vision and blind individuals. There is an emphasis on the ability and accomplishments of people impacted by lack of vision.

Since its inception in the spring of 2006, the program has raised over $55 million to fund sight-saving research with over 200,000 participants in the form of volunteers, team members and, sponsors.

Due to the COVID-19 virus, the FFB held the fall 2020 VisionWalk online, asking participants to take steps to support the virtual VisionWalk by using a treadmill, going on a socially distanced walk, or having a virtual meeting with teammates.

== Dining in the Dark ==
The Foundation Fighting Blindness hosts approximately 10 annual Dining in the Dark fundraising events in various cities around the U.S. Meant to increase awareness about the challenges of the visually impaired, Dining in the Dark is an event where participants dine in the dark. This idea of "dark dining" is not unique to the foundation, as it is also practised in other locations.

== Race to Cure Blindness ==
Race to Cure Blindness is a fundraising program where participants utilize any marathon, triathlon, bike race, or other racing event as a platform to raise money for the Foundation Fighting Blindness.

== VISIONS conference ==
VISIONS is the national conference of the Foundation Fighting Blindness. It is created solely for individuals and families who are affected by retinal diseases. It aims to provide easy access to information on the latest retinal research and clinical trials, the doctors performing the work, coping strategies, and other families from around the country living with the same diseases.

== Vision Seminar Series ==
The Foundation Fighting Blindness' Vision Seminar Series provides a supportive learning environment for people living with macular degeneration, retinitis pigmentosa, and other inherited retinal degenerative diseases. Held around the country, each half-day, free seminar offers patients a forum to hear from prominent doctors and scientists about the latest retinal degenerative disease research, new treatments, therapies, and clinical trials. Vision Seminars not only give affected individuals and their families critical information about research and treatments, but they also provide the hope necessary to cope with these debilitating diseases.

== Partners for Retinal Health ==
Through its Partners for Retinal Health program, the Foundation works with retinal specialists throughout the country to provide the information, resources and hope patients need upon being diagnosed with a retinal degenerative disease.

== See also ==
- Leber congenital amaurosis
- Macular degeneration
- Usher syndrome
- Retinitis pigmentosa
- Stargardt disease
