= National Association for Public Health Statistics and Information Systems =

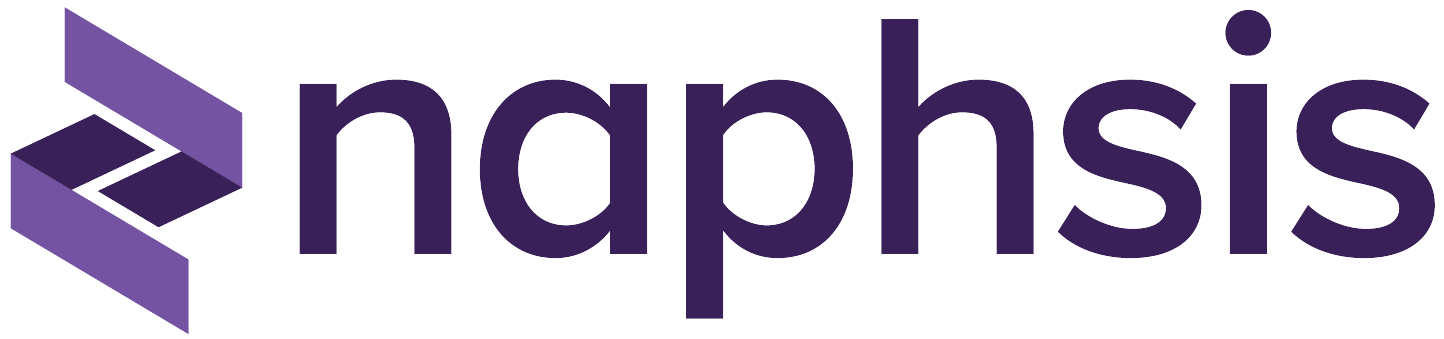
- Abbreviation: NAPHSIS
- Founded: 1933
- Tax ID no.: 52-2265888
- Legal status: 501(c)(3)
- Purpose: To provide national leadership for both vital records and related information systems in order to establish and protect individual identity and improve population health.
- Headquarters: Silver Spring, Maryland, U.S.
- Executive Director: Shae Sutton
- Revenue: $2,520,836 (2016)
- Expenses: $2,505,675 (2016)
- Employees: 11 (2024)
- Website: www.naphsis.org
- Formerly called: American Association of State and Provincial Registration Executives, American Association of Registration Executives, American Association for Vital Records and Public Health Statistics, Association for Vital Records and Health Statistics, Association for Public Health Statistics and Information Systems, National Association for Public Health Statistics and Information Systems

The National Association for Public Health Statistics and Information Systems (NAPHSIS) is a nonprofit national association whose members represent state and local vital records, health statistics and information system agencies. NAPHSIS is incorporated as a nonprofit corporation in the District of Columbia, with offices in Silver Spring, Maryland.

Formed in 1933, NAPHSIS brings together public health professionals from 57 jurisdictions representing all 50 states, the five U.S. territories, New York City, and the District of Columbia.

== History ==
First organized in 1933, NAPHSIS was originally known as the American Association of State Registration Executives. The organization has undergone many name changes since its inception, including

- American Association of State and Provincial Registration Executives, 1938
- American Association of Registration Executives (AARE), 1939
- American Association for Vital Records and Public Health Statistics (AAVR-PHS), 1958
- Association for Vital Records and Health Statistics (AVRHS), 1980
- Association for Public Health Statistics and Information Systems (APHSIS), 1995
- National Association for Public Health Statistics and Information Systems (NAPHSIS), 1996
