= Society for Maternal-Fetal Medicine =

U.S. non-profit organization

The Society for Maternal-Fetal Medicine was established in 1977 and is a not-for-profit organization of over 5,000 members that are dedicated to improving maternal and child outcomes. The organization's headquarters is located in Washington, D.C.

Board certified maternal-fetal medicine physicians have an additional two to three years training in maternal-fetal medicine (MFM) and are involved in the latest advancements in maternal and fetal care. Because of their additional training, MFM's are considered high-risk pregnancy experts. The Society's primary objectives are to promote and expand research and education in maternal-fetal medicine.

== Mission and vision ==
With feedback from the membership, the SMFM Board of Directors revised the vision, mission, and strategic plan of the organization in 2022. The new strategic plan focuses on three goal areas: advocacy and partnerships; member engagement and support; and knowledge, education, and research. Within each goal area, there are detailed strategies that will guide the organization's work for the next three years. Diversity, equity, and inclusion are central to all of SMFM's work, and these principles are intentionally included in each goal area.

=== Mission ===
SMFM supports the clinical practice of maternal-fetal medicine by providing education, promoting research, and engaging in advocacy to optimize equitable outcomes for all people who desire or experience pregnancy.

=== Vision ===
SMFM is dedicated to the advancement of optimal and equitable perinatal outcomes for all people who desire or experience pregnancy.

== Board of Directors, 2025–2026 ==
Current members of the Board:

- Cynthia Gyamfi-Bannerman, MD, MBA – Immediate Past President (San Diego, California)
- Sindhu Srinivas, MD, MSCE – President (Philadelphia, Pennsylvania)
- Alison Cahill, MD MSCI – President Elect (Austin, Texas)
- Joseph R. Biggio Jr., MD, MSHOS – Secretary-Treasurer (New Orleans, Louisiana)
- Blair Wylie, MD, MPH – Assistant Secretary-Treasurer (Boston, Massachusetts)
- Christina Wurster, MBA, CAE – Chief Executive Officer (Ex-Officio) (Washington, D.C.)
