= Lasker Award =

American medical science award

- Awarded for: Major contributions to medical science
- Sponsored by: Lasker Foundation
- Date: 1945
- Reward: $250,000

Highlights
- Basic (2024): Zhijian Chen
- Clinical (2024): Joel Habener, Lotte Bjerre Knudsen, Svetlana Mojsov
- Public Service (2024): Quarraisha Abdool Karim, Salim S. Abdool Karim
- Website: laskerfoundation.org

The Lasker Award is a medical award given annually to the living person considered to have made the greatest contribution to medical science, or who has demonstrated public service on behalf of medicine. It was created in 1945 by Albert Lasker and Mary Woodard Lasker and is administered by the Lasker Foundation.

Eighty-six Lasker laureates have subsequently received the Nobel Prize, including 32 in the last two decades. Claire Pomeroy is the current president of the Lasker Foundation.

== Award ==
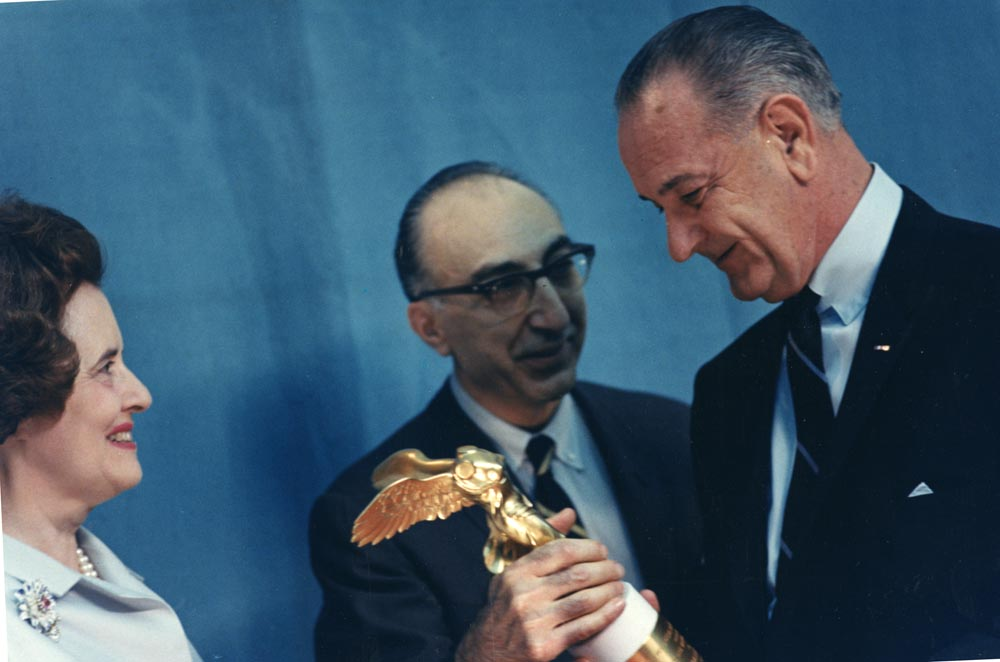
US President Lyndon Johnson was the given award in 1965.

The award is given in four branches of medical science:

1. Albert Lasker Basic Medical Research Award
2. Lasker–DeBakey Clinical Medical Research Award
3. Lasker–Bloomberg Public Service Award (Renamed in 2011 from Mary Woodard Lasker Public Service Award. Renamed in 2000 from Albert Lasker Public Service Award.)
4. Lasker–Koshland Special Achievement Award in Medical Science (1994– renamed to that name in 2008) (optional)

The awards carry an honorarium of $250,000 for each category.

A collection of papers from the Albert and Mary Lasker Foundation were donated to the National Library of Medicine by Mrs. Albert D. Lasker in April 1985.

In addition to the main awards, there are historical awards that are no longer awarded.

== Recent awards ==
Recent winners include the following:

Year	Award	Laureate(s)	Reason
2026	Basic	Emmanuel Mignot	For identification of orexin, a brain peptide that maintains wakefulness, and the discovery that orexin deficiency causes uncontrolled sleep in narcolepsy—revealing a key insight into the nature of sleep.
2026	Basic	Masashi Yanagisawa	For identification of orexin, a brain peptide that maintains wakefulness, and the discovery that orexin deficiency causes uncontrolled sleep in narcolepsy—revealing a key insight into the nature of sleep.
2026	Clinical	Kunihiro Hattori	For invention of a bispecific antibody that joins blood clotting Factors IX and X, restoring deficient Factor VIII activity in hemophilia A and preventing severe bleeding in this genetic disorder.
2026	Clinical	Takehisa Kitazawa	For invention of a bispecific antibody that joins blood clotting Factors IX and X, restoring deficient Factor VIII activity in hemophilia A and preventing severe bleeding in this genetic disorder.
2026	Clinical	Tomoyuki Igawa	For invention of a bispecific antibody that joins blood clotting Factors IX and X, restoring deficient Factor VIII activity in hemophilia A and preventing severe bleeding in this genetic disorder.
2026	Public Service	Michael J. Fox	For empowering patients’ voices and accelerating research to find improved therapies and a cure for Parkinson’s disease.
2025	Basic	Dirk Görlich	For discoveries that exposed the structures and functions of low-complexity domains within protein sequences, revealing new principles of intracellular transport and cellular organization.
2025	Basic	Steven L. McKnight	For discoveries that exposed the structures and functions of low-complexity domains within protein sequences, revealing new principles of intracellular transport and cellular organization.
2025	Clinical	Michael J. Welsh	For their key roles in developing a novel treatment for cystic fibrosis—a triple-drug combination that saves the lives of people with this lethal genetic disease.
2025	Clinical	Jesús Tito González	For their key roles in developing a novel treatment for cystic fibrosis—a triple-drug combination that saves the lives of people with this lethal genetic disease.
2025	Clinical	Paul A. Negulescu	For their key roles in developing a novel treatment for cystic fibrosis—a triple-drug combination that saves the lives of people with this lethal genetic disease.
2025	Special Achievement	Lucy Shapiro	For a 55-year career in biomedical science—honored for discovering how bacteria coordinate their genetic logic in time and space to generate distinct daughter cells; for founding Stanford's distinguished Department of Developmental Biology; and for exemplary leadership at the national level.
2024	Basic	Zhijian Chen	cGAS enzyme that senses self and foreign DNA
2024	Clinical	Joel Habener	GLP-1-based therapy for obesity
2024	Clinical	Lotte Bjerre Knudsen	GLP-1-based therapy for obesity
2024	Clinical	Svetlana Mojsov	GLP-1-based therapy for obesity
2024	Public Service	Quarraisha Abdool Karim	Innovations in HIV prevention, treatment, and advocacy
2024	Public Service	Salim S. Abdool Karim	Innovations in HIV prevention, treatment, and advocacy
2023	Basic	Demis Hassabis	Creating AlphaFold, artificial intelligence program for protein structure prediction.
2023	Basic	John M. Jumper	Creating AlphaFold, artificial intelligence program for protein structure prediction.
2023	Clinical	James G. Fujimoto	Inventing optical coherence tomography.
2023	Clinical	David Huang	Inventing optical coherence tomography.
2023	Clinical	Eric A. Swanson	Inventing optical coherence tomography.
2023	Special Achievement	Piet Borst	A scientific career spanning 50 years, mentorship, and leadership
2022	Basic	Richard O. Hynes	For discoveries concerning the integrins – key mediators of cell–matrix and cell–cell adhesion in physiology and disease.
2022	Basic	Erkki Ruoslahti	For discoveries concerning the integrins – key mediators of cell–matrix and cell–cell adhesion in physiology and disease.
2022	Basic	Timothy A. Springer	For discoveries concerning the integrins – key mediators of cell–matrix and cell–cell adhesion in physiology and disease.
2022	Clinical	Yuk Ming Dennis Lo	For the discovery of fetal DNA in maternal blood, leading to noninvasive prenatal testing for Down syndrome.
2022	Public Service	Lauren Gardner	For creating the COVID-19 Dashboard, which set a new standard for disseminating authoritative public health data in real time.
2021	Basic	Karl Deisseroth	For the discovery of light-sensitive microbial proteins that can activate or silence individual brain cells which was integral in developing optogenetics – a revolutionary technique for neuroscience.
2021	Basic	Peter Hegemann	For the discovery of light-sensitive microbial proteins that can activate or silence individual brain cells which was integral in developing optogenetics – a revolutionary technique for neuroscience.
2021	Basic	Dieter Oesterhelt	For the discovery of light-sensitive microbial proteins that can activate or silence individual brain cells which was integral in developing optogenetics – a revolutionary technique for neuroscience.
2021	Clinical	Katalin Karikó	For the discovery of a new therapeutic technology based on the modification of messenger RNA – enabling rapid development of highly effective COVID-19 vaccines.
2021	Clinical	Drew Weissman	For the discovery of a new therapeutic technology based on the modification of messenger RNA – enabling rapid development of highly effective COVID-19 vaccines.
2021	Special Achievement	David Baltimore	As one of the premier biomedical scientists of the last five decades, he is renowned for the breadth and beauty of his discoveries in virology, immunology, and cancer; for his academic leadership; for his mentorship of prominent scientists; and for his influence as a public advocate for science.
2019	Basic	Max Dale Cooper	For their discovery of the two distinct classes of lymphocytes, B cells and T cells – a monumental achievement that provided the organizing principle of the adaptive immune system and launched the course of modern immunology.
2019	Basic	Jacques Miller	For their discovery of the two distinct classes of lymphocytes, B cells and T cells – a monumental achievement that provided the organizing principle of the adaptive immune system and launched the course of modern immunology.
2019	Clinical	H. Michael Shepard	For their invention of Herceptin, the first monoclonal antibody that blocks HER2, a cancer-causing protein, and for its development as a life-saving therapy for women with breast cancer.
2019	Clinical	Dennis J. Slamon	For their invention of Herceptin, the first monoclonal antibody that blocks HER2, a cancer-causing protein, and for its development as a life-saving therapy for women with breast cancer.
2019	Clinical	Axel Ullrich	For their invention of Herceptin, the first monoclonal antibody that blocks HER2, a cancer-causing protein, and for its development as a life-saving therapy for women with breast cancer.
2019	Public Service	GAVI vaccination alliance	For providing sustained access to childhood vaccines around the globe, saving millions of lives, and for highlighting the power of immunization to prevent disease.
2018	Basic	C. David Allis	For discoveries elucidating how gene expression is influenced by chemical modification of histones – the proteins that package DNA within chromosomes.
2018	Basic	Michael Grunstein	For discoveries elucidating how gene expression is influenced by chemical modification of histones – the proteins that package DNA within chromosomes.
2018	Clinical	John B. Glen	For the discovery and development of propofol, a chemical whose rapid action and freedom from residual effects have made it the most widely used agent for induction of anesthesia in patients throughout the world.
2018	Special Achievement	Joan Argetsinger Steitz	For four decades of leadership in biomedical science – exemplified by pioneering discoveries in RNA biology, generous mentorship of budding scientists, and vigorous and passionate support of women in science.
2017	Basic	Michael N. Hall	For discoveries concerning the nutrient-activated TOR proteins and their central role in the metabolic control of cell growth.
2017	Clinical	Douglas R. Lowy	For technological advances that enabled development of HPV vaccines for prevention of cervical cancer and other tumors caused by human papillomaviruses.
2017	Clinical	John T. Schiller	For technological advances that enabled development of HPV vaccines for prevention of cervical cancer and other tumors caused by human papillomaviruses.
2017	Public Service	Planned Parenthood	For providing essential health services and reproductive care to millions of women for more than a century.
2016	Basic	William G. Kaelin Jr.	For the discovery of the pathway by which cells from humans and most animals sense and adapt to changes in oxygen availability – a process essential for survival.
2016	Basic	Peter J. Ratcliffe	For the discovery of the pathway by which cells from humans and most animals sense and adapt to changes in oxygen availability – a process essential for survival.
2016	Basic	Gregg L. Semenza	For the discovery of the pathway by which cells from humans and most animals sense and adapt to changes in oxygen availability – a process essential for survival.
2016	Clinical	Ralf F. W. Bartenschlager	For development of a system to study the replication of the virus that causes hepatitis C and for use of this system to revolutionize the treatment of this chronic, often lethal disease.
2016	Clinical	Charles M. Rice	For development of a system to study the replication of the virus that causes hepatitis C and for use of this system to revolutionize the treatment of this chronic, often lethal disease.
2016	Clinical	Michael J. Sofia	For development of a system to study the replication of the virus that causes hepatitis C and for use of this system to revolutionize the treatment of this chronic, often lethal disease.
2016	Special Achievement	Bruce M. Alberts	For fundamental discoveries in DNA replication and protein biochemistry; for visionary leadership in directing national and international scientific organizations to better people's lives; and for passionate dedication to improving education in science and mathematics.
2015	Basic	Stephen J. Elledge	For discoveries concerning the DNA-damage response – a fundamental mechanism that protects the genomes of all living organisms.
2015	Basic	Evelyn M. Witkin	For discoveries concerning the DNA-damage response – a fundamental mechanism that protects the genomes of all living organisms.
2015	Clinical	James P. Allison	For the discovery and development of a monoclonal antibody therapy that unleashes the immune system to combat cancer.
2015	Public Service	Médecins Sans Frontières	For bold leadership in responding to the recent Ebola outbreak in Africa and for sustained and effective frontline responses to health emergencies.
2014	Basic	Kazutoshi Mori	For discoveries concerning the unfolded protein response – an intracellular quality control system that detects harmful misfolded proteins in the endoplasmic reticulum and signals the nucleus to carry out corrective measures.
2014	Basic	Peter Walter	For discoveries concerning the unfolded protein response – an intracellular quality control system that detects harmful misfolded proteins in the endoplasmic reticulum and signals the nucleus to carry out corrective measures.
2014	Clinical	Alim-Louis Benabid	For the development of deep brain stimulation of the subthalamic nucleus, a surgical technique that reduces tremors and restores motor function in patients with advanced Parkinson's disease.
2014	Clinical	Mahlon R. DeLong	For the development of deep brain stimulation of the subthalamic nucleus, a surgical technique that reduces tremors and restores motor function in patients with advanced Parkinson's disease.
2014	Special Achievement	Mary-Claire King	For bold, imaginative, and diverse contributions to medical science and human rights – she discovered the BRCA1 gene locus that causes hereditary breast cancer and deployed DNA strategies that reunite missing persons or their remains with their families.
2013	Basic	Richard H. Scheller	For discoveries concerning the molecular machinery and regulatory mechanism that underlie the rapid release of neurotransmitters.
2013	Basic	Thomas C. Südhof	For discoveries concerning the molecular machinery and regulatory mechanism that underlie the rapid release of neurotransmitters.
2013	Clinical	Graeme M. Clark	For the development of the modern cochlear implant – a device that bestows hearing to individuals with profound deafness.
2013	Clinical	Ingeborg Hochmair	For the development of the modern cochlear implant – a device that bestows hearing to individuals with profound deafness.
2013	Clinical	Blake S. Wilson	For the development of the modern cochlear implant – a device that bestows hearing to individuals with profound deafness.
2013	Public Service	Bill Gates	For leading a historic transformation in the way we view the globe's most pressing health concerns and improving the lives of millions of the world's most vulnerable.
2013	Public Service	Melinda Gates	For leading a historic transformation in the way we view the globe's most pressing health concerns and improving the lives of millions of the world's most vulnerable.
2012	Basic	Michael Sheetz	For discoveries concerning cytoskeletal motor proteins, machines that move cargoes within cells, contract muscles, and enable cell movements.
2012	Basic	James Spudich	For discoveries concerning cytoskeletal motor proteins, machines that move cargoes within cells, contract muscles, and enable cell movements.
2012	Basic	Ronald Vale	For discoveries concerning cytoskeletal motor proteins, machines that move cargoes within cells, contract muscles, and enable cell movements.
2012	Clinical	Roy Calne	For the development of liver transplantation, which has restored normal life to thousands of patients with end-stage liver disease.
2012	Clinical	Thomas Starzl	For the development of liver transplantation, which has restored normal life to thousands of patients with end-stage liver disease.
2012	Special Achievement	Donald D. Brown	For exceptional leadership and citizenship in biomedical science – exemplified by fundamental discoveries concerning the nature of genes; by selfless commitment to young scientists; and by disseminating revolutionary technologies to the scientific community.
2012	Special Achievement	Tom Maniatis	For exceptional leadership and citizenship in biomedical science – exemplified by fundamental discoveries concerning the nature of genes; by selfless commitment to young scientists; and by disseminating revolutionary technologies to the scientific community.
2011	Basic	Franz-Ulrich Hartl	For discoveries concerning the cell's protein-folding machinery, exemplified by cage-like structures that convert newly made proteins into their biologically active forms.
2011	Basic	Arthur L. Horwich	For discoveries concerning the cell's protein-folding machinery, exemplified by cage-like structures that convert newly made proteins into their biologically active forms.
2011	Clinical	Tu Youyou	For the discovery of artemisinin, a drug therapy for malaria that has saved millions of lives across the globe, especially in the developing world.
2011	Public Service	National Institutes of Health Clinical Center	For serving, since its inception, as a model research hospital – providing innovative therapy and high-quality patient care, treating rare and severe diseases, and producing outstanding physician-scientists whose collective work has set a standard of excellence in biomedical research.
2010	Basic	Douglas L. Coleman	Discovery of leptin, a hormone that regulates appetite and body weight – a breakthrough that opened obesity research to molecular exploration.
2010	Basic	Jeffrey M. Friedman	Discovery of leptin, a hormone that regulates appetite and body weight – a breakthrough that opened obesity research to molecular exploration.
2010	Clinical	Napoleone Ferrara	Discovery of VEGF as a major mediator of angiogenesis and the development of an effective anti-VEGF therapy for wet macular degeneration, a leading cause of blindness in the elderly.
2010	Special Achievement	David Weatherall	For 50 years of international statesmanship in biomedical science – exemplified by discoveries concerning genetic diseases of the blood and for leadership in improving clinical care for thousands of children with thalassemia throughout the developing world.
2009	Basic	John Gurdon	Discoveries concerning nuclear reprogramming, the process that instructs specialized adult cells to form early stem cells – creating the potential to become any type of mature cell for experimental or therapeutic purposes.
2009	Basic	Shinya Yamanaka	Discoveries concerning nuclear reprogramming, the process that instructs specialized adult cells to form early stem cells – creating the potential to become any type of mature cell for experimental or therapeutic purposes.
2009	Clinical	Brian Druker	The development of molecularly-targeted treatments for chronic myeloid leukemia, converting a fatal cancer into a manageable chronic condition.
2009	Clinical	Nicholas Lydon	The development of molecularly-targeted treatments for chronic myeloid leukemia, converting a fatal cancer into a manageable chronic condition.
2009	Clinical	Charles Sawyers	The development of molecularly-targeted treatments for chronic myeloid leukemia, converting a fatal cancer into a manageable chronic condition.
2009	Public Service	Michael Bloomberg	Employing sound science in political decision making; setting a world standard for the public's health as an impetus for government action; leading the way to reduce the scourge of tobacco use; and advancing public health through enlightened philanthropy.
2008	Basic	Victor Ambros	Discoveries that revealed an unanticipated world of tiny RNAs that regulate gene function in plants and animals.
2008	Basic	David Baulcombe	Discoveries that revealed an unanticipated world of tiny RNAs that regulate gene function in plants and animals.
2008	Basic	Gary Ruvkun	Discoveries that revealed an unanticipated world of tiny RNAs that regulate gene function in plants and animals.
2008	Clinical	Akira Endo	The discovery of the statins – drugs with remarkable LDL-cholesterol-lowering properties that have revolutionized the prevention and treatment of coronary heart disease.
2008	Special Achievement	Stanley Falkow	A 51-year career as one of the great microbe hunters of all time – he discovered the molecular nature of antibiotic resistance, revolutionized the way we think about how pathogens cause disease, and mentored more than 100 students, many of whom are now distinguished leaders in the fields of microbiology and infectious diseases.
2007	Basic	Ralph Steinman	The discovery of dendritic cells – the preeminent component of the immune system that initiates and regulates the body's response to foreign antigens.
2007	Clinical	Alain Carpentier	The development of prosthetic mitral and aortic valves, which have prolonged and enhanced the lives of millions of people with heart disease.
2007	Clinical	Albert Starr	The development of prosthetic mitral and aortic valves, which have prolonged and enhanced the lives of millions of people with heart disease.
2007	Public Service	Anthony Fauci	For his role as the principal architect of two major U.S. governmental programs, one aimed at AIDS and the other at biodefense.
2006	Basic	Elizabeth Blackburn	The prediction and discovery of telomerase, a remarkable RNA-containing enzyme that synthesizes the ends of chromosomes, protecting them and maintaining the integrity of the genome
2006	Basic	Carol Greider	The prediction and discovery of telomerase, a remarkable RNA-containing enzyme that synthesizes the ends of chromosomes, protecting them and maintaining the integrity of the genome
2006	Basic	Jack Szostak	The prediction and discovery of telomerase, a remarkable RNA-containing enzyme that synthesizes the ends of chromosomes, protecting them and maintaining the integrity of the genome
2006	Clinical	Aaron Beck	The development of cognitive therapy, which has transformed the understanding and treatment of many psychiatric conditions, including depression, suicidal behavior, generalized anxiety, panic attacks, and eating disorders.
2006	Special Achievement	Joseph Gall	A distinguished 57-year-career as a founder of modern cell biology and the field of chromosome structure and function; bold experimentalist; inventor of in situ hybridization; and early champion of women in science.
2005	Basic	Ernest McCulloch	Ingenious experiments that first identified a stem cell – the blood-forming stem cell – which set the stage for all current research on adult and embryonic stem cells.
2005	Basic	James Till	Ingenious experiments that first identified a stem cell – the blood-forming stem cell – which set the stage for all current research on adult and embryonic stem cells.
2005	Clinical	Alec John Jeffreys	Development of two powerful technologies – Southern hybridization and DNA fingerprinting – that together revolutionized human genetics and forensic diagnostics.
2005	Clinical	Edwin Mellor Southern	Development of two powerful technologies – Southern hybridization and DNA fingerprinting – that together revolutionized human genetics and forensic diagnostics.
2005	Public Service	Nancy Brinker	For creating one of the world's great foundations devoted to curing breast cancer and for dramatically increasing public awareness about this devastating disease.
2004	Basic	Pierre Chambon	For the discovery of the superfamily of nuclear hormone receptors and elucidation of a unifying mechanism that regulates embryonic development and diverse metabolic pathways.
2004	Basic	Ronald M. Evans	For the discovery of the superfamily of nuclear hormone receptors and elucidation of a unifying mechanism that regulates embryonic development and diverse metabolic pathways.
2004	Basic	Elwood V. Jensen	For the discovery of the superfamily of nuclear hormone receptors and elucidation of a unifying mechanism that regulates embryonic development and diverse metabolic pathways.
2004	Clinical	Charles Kelman	For revolutionizing the surgical removal of cataracts, turning a 10-day hospital stay into an outpatient procedure, and dramatically reducing complications.
2004	Special Achievement	Matthew Meselson	For a lifetime career that combines penetrating discovery in molecular biology with creative leadership in the public policy of chemical and biological weapons.
2003	Basic	Robert G. Roeder	Pioneering studies on eukaryotic RNA polymerases and the general transcriptional machinery, which opened gene expression in animal cells to biochemical analysis.
2003	Clinical	Marc Feldmann	Discovery of anti-TNF therapy as an effective treatment for rheumatoid arthritis and other autoimmune diseases.
2003	Clinical	Ravinder N. Maini	Discovery of anti-TNF therapy as an effective treatment for rheumatoid arthritis and other autoimmune diseases.
2003	Public Service	Christopher Reeve	Perceptive, sustained, and heroic advocacy for medical research in general, and victims of disability in particular.
2002	Basic	James E. Rothman	Discoveries revealing the universal molecular machinery that orchestrates the budding and fusion of membrane vesicles – a process essential to organelle formation, nutrient uptake, and secretion of hormones and neurotransmitters.
2002	Basic	Randy W. Schekman	Discoveries revealing the universal molecular machinery that orchestrates the budding and fusion of membrane vesicles – a process essential to organelle formation, nutrient uptake, and secretion of hormones and neurotransmitters.
2002	Clinical	Willem J. Kolff	Development of renal hemodialysis, which changed kidney failure from a fatal to a treatable disease, prolonging the useful lives of millions of patients.
2002	Clinical	Belding H. Scribner	Development of renal hemodialysis, which changed kidney failure from a fatal to a treatable disease, prolonging the useful lives of millions of patients.
2002	Special Achievement	James E. Darnell Jr.	For an exceptional career in biomedical science during which he opened two fields in biology – RNA processing and cytokine signaling – and fostered the development of many creative scientists.
2001	Basic	Mario R. Capecchi	Development of a powerful technology for manipulating the mouse genome with exquisite precision, which allows the creation of animal models of human disease.
2001	Basic	Martin J. Evans	Development of a powerful technology for manipulating the mouse genome with exquisite precision, which allows the creation of animal models of human disease.
2001	Basic	Oliver Smithies	Development of a powerful technology for manipulating the mouse genome with exquisite precision, which allows the creation of animal models of human disease.
2001	Clinical	Robert G. Edwards	Development of in vitro fertilization, a technological advance that has revolutionized the treatment of human infertility.
2001	Public Service	William H. Foege	For courageous leadership in improving worldwide public health, and his prominent role in the eradication of smallpox.
2000	Basic	Aaron Ciechanover	For the discovery and recognition of the broad significance of the ubiquitin system of regulated protein degradation, a fundamental process that influences vital cellular events, including the cell cycle, malignant transformation, and responses to inflammation and immunity.
2000	Basic	Avram Hershko	For the discovery and recognition of the broad significance of the ubiquitin system of regulated protein degradation, a fundamental process that influences vital cellular events, including the cell cycle, malignant transformation, and responses to inflammation and immunity.
2000	Basic	Alexander Varshavsky	For the discovery and recognition of the broad significance of the ubiquitin system of regulated protein degradation, a fundamental process that influences vital cellular events, including the cell cycle, malignant transformation, and responses to inflammation and immunity.
2000	Clinical	Harvey J. Alter	Discovery of the virus that causes hepatitis C and the development of screening methods that reduced the risk of blood transfusion-associated hepatitis in the U.S. from 30% in 1970 to virtually zero in 2000.
2000	Clinical	Michael Houghton	Discovery of the virus that causes hepatitis C and the development of screening methods that reduced the risk of blood transfusion-associated hepatitis in the U.S. from 30% in 1970 to virtually zero in 2000.
2000	Special Achievement	Sydney Brenner	For 50 years of brilliant creativity in biomedical science – exemplified by his legendary work on the genetic code; his daring introduction of the roundworm Caenorhabditis elegans as a system for tracing the birth and death of every cell in a living animal; his rational voice in the debate on recombinant DNA; and his trenchant wit.

== Historical awards ==
Awards no longer made include Special Public Health Awards, Special Awards, Group Awards, and Lasker Awards made by the International Society for the Rehabilitation of the Disabled, the National Committee Against Mental Illness, and Planned Parenthood – World Population. Awards were also presented for medical journalism.

=== Special Public Health awards ===
- 1975 – Merck Sharp and Dohme Research Laboratories: Karl H. Beyer Jr., James M. Sprague, John E. Baer, Frederick C. Novello
- 1980 – National Heart, Lung, and Blood Institute
- 1984 – Dorothy T. Krieger, Kevin McLaughlin Jr.
- 1987 – Centennial Salute to the National Institutes of Health

=== Special awards ===
- 1947 – Thomas Parran Jr.
- 1949 – Haven Emerson
- 1952 – Charles-Edward Amory Winslow
- 1956 – Alan Gregg
- 1959 – J. Lister Hill and John E. Fogarty

=== Group awards ===
- 1946 – National Institutes of Health; National Regional Research Laboratory of the US Department of Agriculture; Board for the Coordination of Malarial Studies; Bureau of Entomology and Plant Quarantine of the US Department of Agriculture; Army Epidemiological Board
- 1947 – British Ministry of Health and Ministry of Food; United States Committee on Joint Causes of Death
- 1948 – Veterans Administration's Department of Medicine and Surgery
- 1949 – American Academy of Pediatrics; Life Insurance Medical Research Fund
- 1950 – International Health Division of The Rockefeller Foundation
- 1951 – Health Insurance Plan of Greater New York; Alcoholics Anonymous
- 1953 – Division of Research Grants of the National Institutes of Health; University Laboratory of Physical Chemistry Related to Medicine at Harvard University
- 1954 – Streptococcal Disease Laboratory, Armed Forces Epidemiological Board, Francis E. Warren Air Force Base: Charles H. Rammelkamp Jr., Director
- 1956 – Food and Drug Administration; Medical Care Program, Welfare and Retirement Fund of the United Mine Workers of America
- 1960 – Crippled Children's Program of the Children's Bureau; Chronic Disease Program of the California State Department of Public Health (Lester Breslow)

=== International Society for the Rehabilitation of the Disabled ===
- 1954 – Henry H. Kessler, Juan Farill, Viscount Nuffield
- 1957 – Howard A. Rusk, Fabian W. G. Langenskiold, World Veterans Federation
- 1960 – Mary E. Switzer, Gudmund Harlem, Paul W. Brand
- 1963 – Renato de Costa Bomfim, Kurt Jansson, Leonard W. Mayo
- 1966 – Poul Stochholm, Wiktor Dega, Eugene J. Taylor
- 1969 – Gustav Gringas, Mr and Mrs Raden Soeharso, Andre Trannoy, International Labour Organization
- 1972 – James F. Garrett, Kamala V. Nimbkar, Jean Regniers

=== National Committee Against Mental Illness ===
- 1944 – William C. Menninger
- 1945 – G. Brock Chisholm, John Rawlings Rees
- 1946 – W. Horsley Gantt, Jules H. Masserman, Walter Lerch, Douglass Rice Sharpe, Lawrence K. Frank
- 1947 – Catherine MacKenzie
- 1948 – C. Anderson Aldrich, Mike Gorman, Al Ostrow
- 1949 – Mildred C. Scoville, Albert Deutsch

=== Planned Parenthood – World Population ===
- 1945 – John McLeod, Felix J. Underwood
- 1946 – Robert Latou Dickinson, Irl Cephas Riggin
- 1947 – Alan F. Guttmacher, Abraham Stone
- 1948 – John Rock, Richard N. Pierson
- 1949 – George M. Cooper, Carl G. Hartman
- 1950 – Margaret Sanger, Bessie L. Moses
- 1951 – Guy Irving Burch, William Vogt
- 1952 – John William Roy Norton, Herbert Thoms, Eleanor Bellows Pillsbury
- 1953 – Harry Emerson Fosdick, Elise Ottesen-Jensen
- 1954 – Dhanvanthi Rama Rau, M. C. Chang, Howard C. Taylor
- 1955 – Warren O. Nelson, Robert Carter Cook
- 1958 – Harrison S. Brown
- 1959 – Julian Huxley
- 1960 – Gregory Pincus
- 1961 – John D. Rockefeller, III
- 1964 – Cass Canfield
- 1965 – C. Lee Buxton, Estelle T. Griswold

== See also ==
- List of medicine awards
