= Nuclear Receptor Signaling Atlas =

The Nuclear Receptor Signaling Atlas (NURSA) was a United States National Institutes of Health-funded research consortium focused on nuclear receptors and nuclear receptor coregulators. Its co-principal investigators were Bert O'Malley and Neil McKenna of Baylor College of Medicine and Ron Evans of the Salk Institute. NURSA has now been retired and replaced by the Signaling Pathways Project (SPP).
