= L. Royal Christensen =

American epidemiologist

L. Royal Christensen (1915 – 22 March 1997) was an American epidemiologist who, along with André Cournand and William S. Tillett, won the 1949 Lasker Award for their work in showing that the enzymes streptokinase and streptodornase can be used to treat disease. Christensen was born in Everson, Washington. He did his undergraduate work at University of Washington and received a PhD from St. Louis University in 1941. He then taught microbiology at New York University School of Medicine-Bellevue Medical.

His work involving both the enzyme streptokinase, which can help dissolve blood clots, and purifying the enzyme streptodornase, which can be used to "dissolve secretions from infections" showed that they can be used to prevent the necessity of surgical removal of infections, was recognized by the Albert Lasker Award for Basic Medical Research in 1949. Described as thrombolytic therapy, this treatment was named as one of the top ten discoveries in cardiology in the 20th century.

In 1953 he became director of Berg Institute for Experimental Physiology.

He moved to Toronto in 1967 and began working for the Division of Laboratory Animal Science at the University of Toronto. He founded the American Association of Laboratory Animal Science, serving first president.
