= Ronald M. Evans =

American biologist

- Born: April 17, 1949; Los Angeles, California, United States
- Education: UCLA
- Awards: Albert Lasker Award for Basic Medical Research(2004); Wolf Prize in Medicine(2012); Louisa Gross Horwitz Prize(2018)
- Scientific career
- Workplaces: Salk Institute for Biological Studies

Ronald Mark Evans (born April 17, 1949, in Los Angeles, California) is an American Biologist, Professor and Head of the Salk's Gene Expression Laboratory, and the March of Dimes Chair in Molecular and Developmental Biology at the Salk Institute for Biological Studies in La Jolla, California and a Howard Hughes Medical Institute Investigator. Dr. Ronald M. Evans is known for his original discoveries of nuclear hormone receptors (NR), a special class of transcriptional factor, and the elucidation of their universal mechanism of action, a process that governs how lipophilic hormones and drugs regulate virtually every developmental and metabolic pathway in animals and humans. Nowadays, NRs are among the most widely investigated group of pharmaceutical targets in the world, already yielding benefits in drug discovery for cancer, muscular dystrophies, osteoporosis, type II diabetes, obesity, and cardiovascular diseases. His current research focuses on the function of nuclear hormone signaling and their function in metabolism and cancer.

He received his Bachelor of Science and PhD (1974) from UCLA, followed by a postdoctoral training at Rockefeller University with James E. Darnell. He became a faculty member at the Salk Institute in 1978 and an adjunct professor in biology, Biomedical Sciences, Neuroscience at UCSD (1985, 1989, 1995). He was named March of Dimes Chair in Molecular and Developmental Neurobiology at the Salk Institute in 1998.

His work on nuclear receptors was well recognized, thus he is a recipient of more than 40 nationally or internationally acclaimed awards and honors. In 2003 he was awarded the March of Dimes Prize in Developmental Biology. He received the Albert Lasker Award for Basic Medical Research (2004). He is also recipient of the Harvey Prize (2006), the Gairdner Foundation International Award (2006), the Albany Medical Center Prize (2007), the Wolf Prize in Medicine (2012) and the Louisa Gross Horwitz Prize (2018). He is a member of the National Academy of Sciences since 1989, a member of American Society for Microbiology since 1993, a member of American Academy of Arts and Sciences since 1997, a member of the National Academy of Medicine since 2003, a member of European Molecular Biology Organization since 2006, a member of the American Philosophical Society since 2007, an elected fellow of the American Association for Cancer Research in 2014, named AAAS fellow in 2018 and a member of the National Academy of Inventors in 2018. Consistent with the broad impact of his work, he is listed by the Institute of Scientific Information as one of the most cited scientists of the past decade.

== Research ==
Members of the nuclear receptor (NR) superfamily of ligand-regulated transcription factors play important roles in reproduction, development, and physiology. In humans, genetic mutations in NRs are causes of rare diseases, while hormones and drugs that target NRs are in widespread therapeutic use. In 80s, Dr. Evans successfully cloned the first nuclear hormone receptor, the human glucocorticoid receptor. This action led to the finding of a superfamily of nuclear hormone receptors, all with similar molecular and genetic structures. Other of his pioneering studies include investigating hormones’ normal activities and their roles in disease, including a major discovery of nuclear hormone receptors, which respond to steroid hormones, vitamin A, vitamin D, thyroid hormones, and bile acids. By targeting genes these receptors help control sugar, salt, calcium, cholesterol, and fat metabolism. They are primary targets in breast, prostate, and pancreatic cancers and leukemia treatment and have therapeutic roles in chronic inflammation, osteoporosis, type 2 diabetes, and asthma. His muscle metabolism studies led to the discovery of exercise mimetics, which promote the benefits of fitness without training and may help battle the obesity epidemic, diabetes, heart disease, and frailty.

== Awards ==
- 2021 The Asan Award in Medicine
- 2018 The Louisa Gross Horwitz Prize(Columbia University) (shared with Pierre Chambon and Bert W. O’Malley)
- 2012 The Wolf Prize in Medicine
- 2007 The Albany Medical Center Prize (shared with Solomon H. Snyder and Robert J. Lefkowitz)
- 2006 The Harvey Prize:"Discovery of a super-family of genes encoding nuclear hormone receptors and the elucidation of their universal ability to affect gene expression and thereby virtually every developmental and metabolic pathway."
- 2006 The Gairdner Foundation International Award
- 2005 The Grande Médaille D'Or (Grand Gold Medal)
- 2005 The Glenn T. Seaborg Medal
- 2004 The Albert Lasker Award for Basic Medical Research (shared with Pierre Chambon and Elwood V. Jensen)
- 2003 The Keio Medical Science Prize
- 1999 The Fred Conrad Koch award
- 1995 The Dickson Prize
- 1994 California Scientist of the Year
- 1993 The Edwin B. Astwood Lecture award
