= Susan McConnell =

American neuroscientist

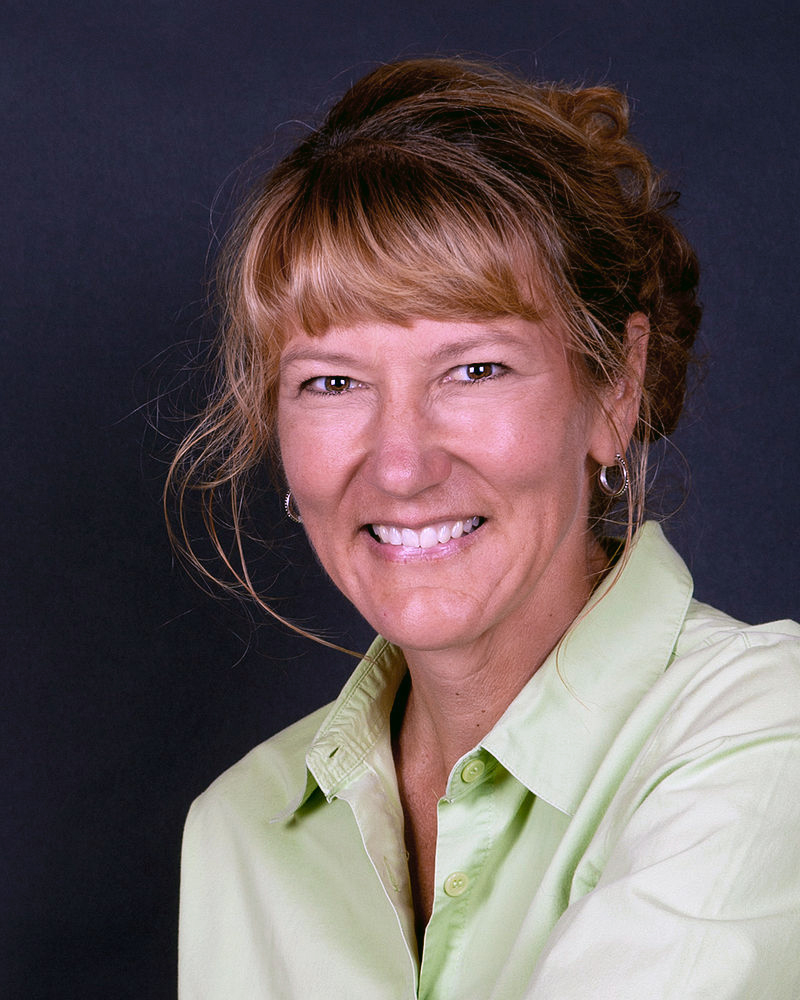
- Born: 1958 (age 67–68); Gary, Indiana
- Education: Harvard University
- Known for: Neural development
- Scientific career
- Fields: Neurobiology
- Workplaces: Stanford University
- Doctoral advisor: Simon LeVay

Susan McConnell is a neurobiologist who studies the development of neural circuits in the mammalian cerebral cortex. She is a professor in the Department of Biology at Stanford University, where she is the Susan B. Ford Professor of Humanities and Sciences, a Bass University Fellow, and a Howard Hughes Medical Institute Professor. She is an elected member of the National Academy of Sciences and the American Academy of Arts and Sciences.

== Education ==
McConnell graduated with a joint A.B. degree from Harvard College and Radcliffe College in 1980. She did her doctoral work in the research group of Simon LeVay and received her PhD in neurobiology from Harvard University in 1987. She was a postdoctoral fellow in the laboratory of Carla J. Shatz at Stanford University.

== Research ==
McConnell's research focuses on understanding how neurons in the developing cerebral cortex are produced, differentiated, and connected to form functional circuits.

McConnell's research showed that progression through the cell cycle plays a key role in determining the final differentiated state of a neural progenitor cell. McConnell also confirmed the hypothesis that asymmetric cell division, as determined by the orientation of the dividing progenitor's cleavage plane, regulates cortical development. Her work elucidated the first molecular mechanism for this process, showing that asymmetrically inherited Notch proteins determine whether a new daughter cell will differentiate into a neuron or remain a neural progenitor.

Her work also showed that developing cortical neurons use a variety of different migratory paths as they move from their birthplace to their final destination in the cortex. This work stood in contrast to a prevailing theory at the time, that all neuronal migration in the cortex was dependent upon radial glia.

McConnell's recent work has continued to outline the molecular mechanisms underlying neural differentiation, neuronal migration and axon guidance.

== Teaching ==
Stanford University has recognized McConnell with its two highest teaching honors, the Hoagland Prize for Undergraduate Teaching and the Walter J. Gores Award for Excellence in Teaching. She has taught undergraduate courses on neural development since joining Stanford's faculty in 1989.

From 2010 to 2012, McConnell co-chaired a university-wide commission that evaluated undergraduate education at Stanford. The commission's recommendations encouraged students and teachers "to reconsider what they do, how they do it, and why it matters", and urged reforms to the university's general education programs.

In addition, Dr. McConnell and author Andrew Todhunter were the principal force behind the creation of Stanford's Senior Reflection in Biology, a capstone course for senior undergraduates where life-science students undertake creative projects synthesizing the arts and sciences.

== Conservation photography ==
In addition to her career in research and teaching, McConnell is an accomplished wildlife photographer. After photographing animals during a trip to the Svalbard archipelago in Norway, she developed an interest in using photography to tell stories about animal behavior. She teaches undergraduate classes on conservation photography at Stanford. Her photos have been featured in various publications including Smithsonian and National Geographic.

McConnell was the first non-art Stanford faculty member to have a show in the Stanford Art Gallery. Her show was called On the Shoulders of Giants and focused on elephants, their poaching, and the crisis of the ivory trade.

== Personal life ==
McConnell is married to Richard Scheller, former chief scientific officer and head of therapeutics at 23andMe and the former executive vice president of research and early development at Genentech.

== Awards and honors ==
McConnell is a member of the National Academy of Sciences and the American Academy of Arts and Sciences, and is a Howard Hughes Medical Institute Professor. She has received many other awards and honors, including:

- Krieg Cortical Discoverer, awarded by the Cajal Club (2011)
- MERIT Award, National Institute of Mental Health (2008)
- McKnight Investigator (1997–1999)
- Hoagland Prize for Undergraduate Teaching (1997)
- Society for Neuroscience Young Investigator Award (1995)
- McKnight Scholar (1993–1996)
- National Science Foundation Presidential Faculty Fellow (1993–1996)
- National Science Foundation Presidential Young Investigator (1991–1993)
- Alfred P. Sloan Research Fellow (1991–1993)
- Marcus Singer Award (1990)
- Pew Scholar in the Biomedical Sciences (1989–1994 )
- National Research Service Award, National Eye Institute (1987–1989)
- National Science Foundation Graduate Research Fellowship (1981–1984)
