= Jules T. Freund =

American immunologist

Jules Freund (June 24, 1890 – April 22, 1960) was a Hungarian born American immunologist, most famous for the Freund's adjuvant.

According to the Journal of Immunology, "Jules (Julius) Freund studied in Budapest at the Royal Hungarian University. After receiving the degree of M.D. at the age of 23, he served as Medical Interne in the Austrian Army (1913–1914) and was attached to the Department of Hygiene at the University as Assistant. Following the outbreak of war in 1914, he saw service in the Austrian Army and returned to the University in Budapest as Commissioner for Hygiene in the army. He held the post of assistant professor in Preventive Medicine, earning the Certificate of Public Health in 1920. In 1922 he went to Hamburg, working in the Department of Hygiene at the Medical School."

In 1942, Jules Freund and Katherine McDermott published a paper on their experiments on immunization of guinea pigs with horse serum containing killed tubercle bacilli and adjuvant. Their paper is generally considered to be a landmark in immunology.

Freund shared the 1959 Albert Lasker Award for Basic Medical Research with Albert Coons for research done independently.

== See also ==
- Freund's adjuvant
