= Catherine MacKenzie =

Canadian-born journalist (1894 –1949)

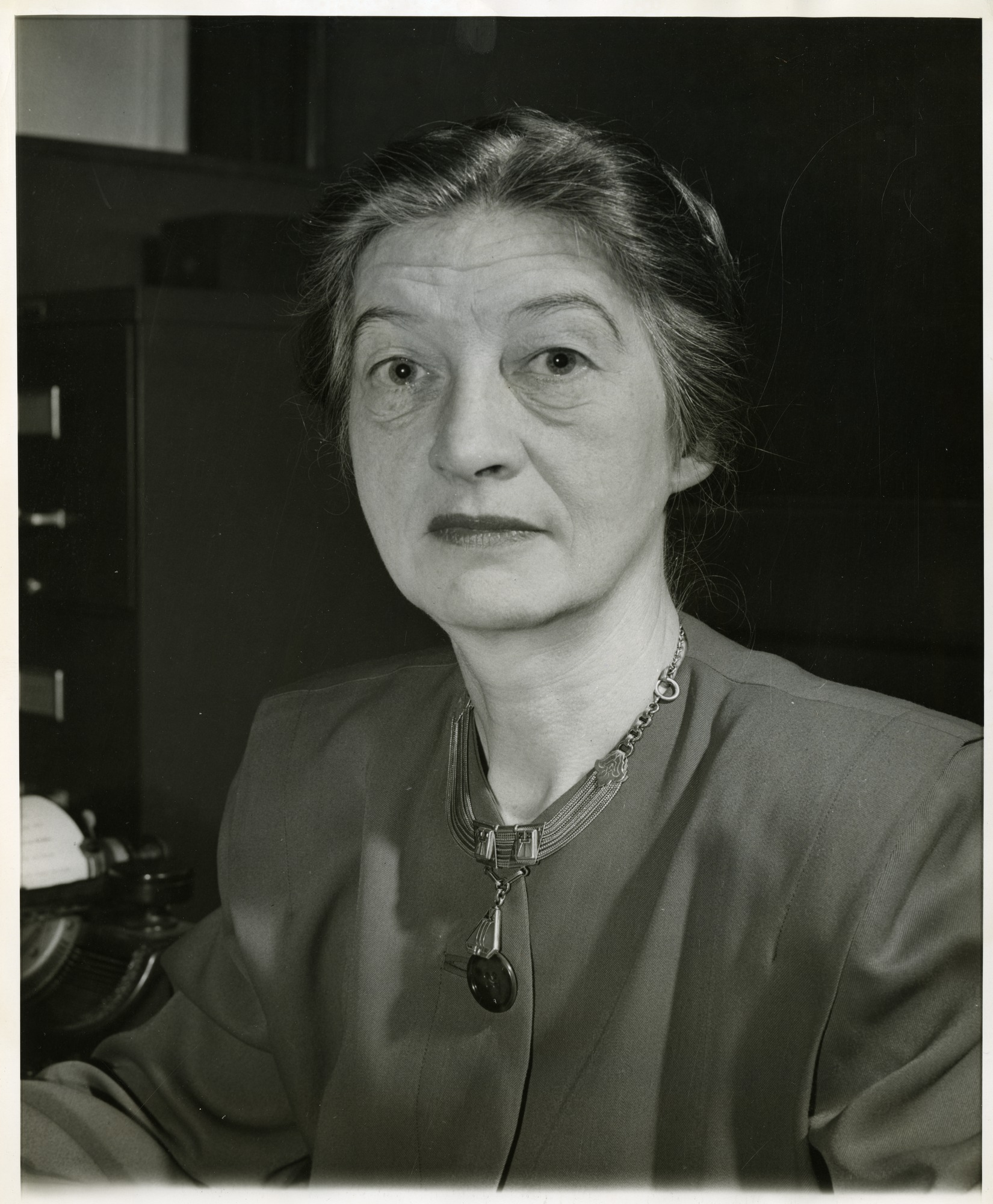
- MacKenzie photographed at The New York Times in 1947
- Born: 1894; Baddeck, Cape Breton, Nova Scotia, Canada
- Died: 24 October 1949 (aged 54–55); New York, New York, United States
- Other name: Catherine Bierstadt
- Occupation: Journalist

Catherine Dunlop MacKenzie (c. 1894 – 24 October 1949) was a Canadian-born journalist who worked in New York City.

== Biography ==
MacKenzie was born in the small town of Baddeck, Nova Scotia, around 1894. Baddeck was the site of Alexander Graham Bell's summer home, and towards the end of his life he spent increasing time there conducting experiments. For the eight years preceding Bell's 1922 death, MacKenzie worked as his personal secretary and research assistant. In 1928 she published a biography of Bell entitled Alexander Graham Bell: The Man Who Contracted Space.

By 1929, MacKenzie had moved to New York City where she initially found work writing a series of newspaper and magazine articles about her home province of Nova Scotia, which were paid for by the provincial government. She later became the parent/child editor of The New York Times, a position she held until her death. In 1947, she received the Lasker Award for her work on mental illness, in relation to her regular "Parent and Child" column.

MacKenzie married the New York writer Edward Hale Bierstadt in 1926.
