= Mildred Clare Scoville =

Psychiatric social worker

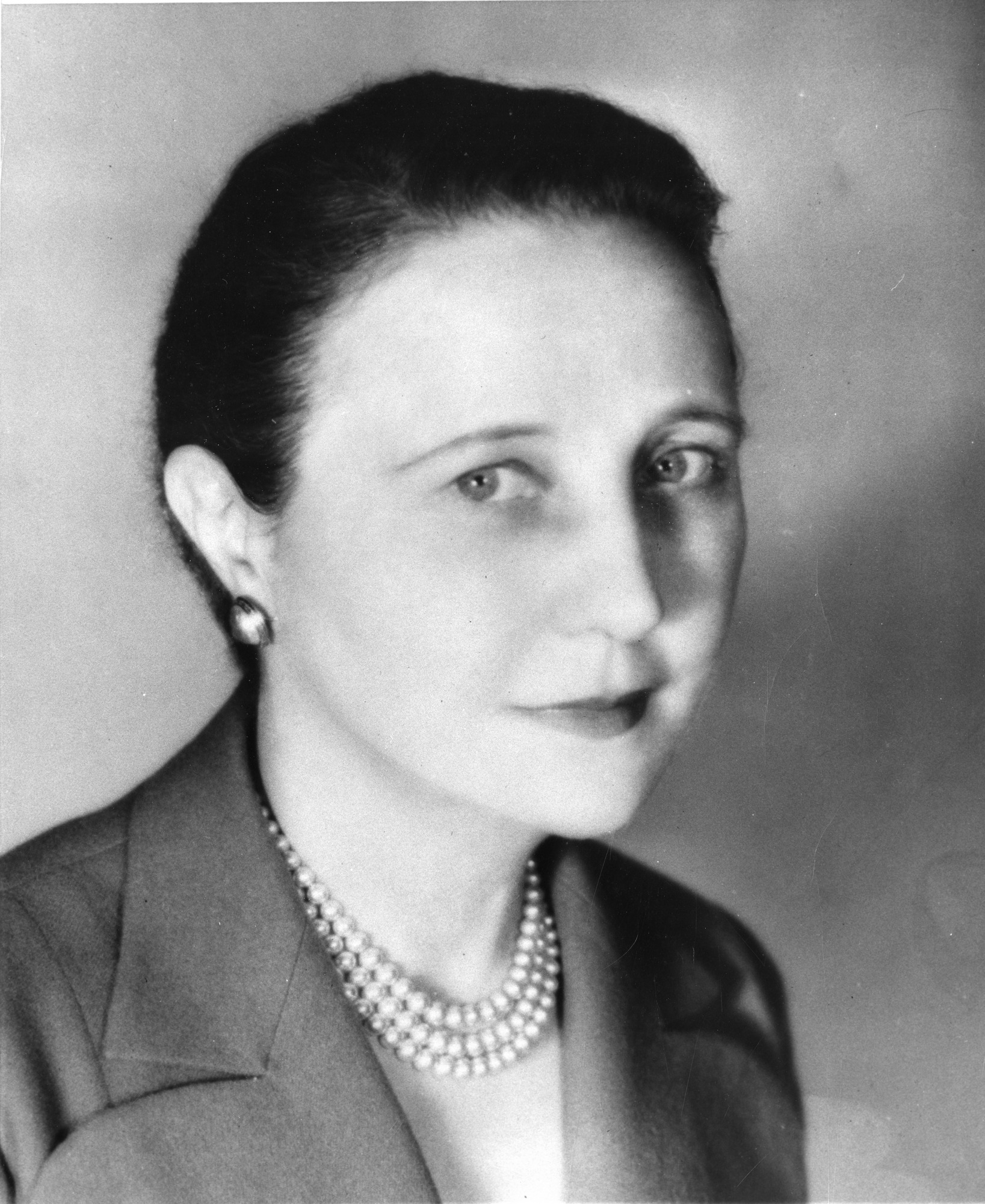
- Education: University of Nebraska

Mildred Clare Scoville (1892–1969) was a psychiatric social worker who won a Lasker Award in 1949. She is known for her work on mental hygiene.

== Early life ==
She was born in 1892 in Hartington, Nebraska and graduated from the University of Nebraska.

== Career ==
Scoville joined the Commonwealth Fund of America in 1923 and later retired as executive associate director in 1954. In 1927, she moved to England because the Commonwealth Fund of America requested her to do an experiment to work on clinics for children. She later led leading positions in developing mental health services back in the United States. In 1931, she wrote “An Inquiry into the Status of Psychiatric Social Work”.

In 1950, she was named to the National Advisory Mental Health Council, thereby becoming the first person to serve on the council.

Scoville died in 1969.

== Selected publications ==
- Scoville, Mildred C. (1931). "An inquiry into the status of psychiatric social work". American Journal of Orthopsychiatry. 1 (2): 145–151. doi:10.1111/j.1939-0025.1931.tb04808.x. ISSN 1939-0025.
- SCOVILLE, MILDRED C. (1942). "Wartime tasks of psychiatric social workers in Great Britain". American Journal of Psychiatry. 99 (3): 358–363. doi:10.1176/ajp.99.3.358. hdl:10654/44094. ISSN 0002-953X.

== Awards and honors ==
Scoville was one of two recipients of the 1949 Lasker Award. She received the Lasker Award for “recognition of her outstanding contribution to the integration of mental health concepts in medical education and practice”.
