= Herbert Thoms =

Herbert Thoms in 1910

Herbert Thoms (1885-1972) was an obstetrician and gynecologist who was an early advocate for natural childbirth and birth control. Thoms was chairman of the medical advisory council of the Connecticut Planned Parenthood League in 1961, when the league started a legal battle against state laws that restricted access to birth control.

== Career ==
Herbert King Thoms was born in Waterbury, Connecticut on January 6, 1885. His early education was acquired at the Vermont Academy and the Waterbury High School. Thoms came to the Yale School of Medicine directly from high school, as was common at the time, and obtained his M.D. in 1910. He interned at Memorial Hospital in New London, CT and at the Backus Hospital in Norwich. He then served as an assistant resident at the Sloane Hospital for Women in New York. In 1914, he did postgraduate work in obstetrics at Johns Hopkins in Baltimore, where he worked under John Whitridge Williams.

Returning to New Haven in 1915, Thoms joined the Yale School of Medicine and served in 1916 as an assistant in the school's pathology department. He became a member of the New Haven County Medical Association in 1915, becoming its president in 1923. In 1920, he was one of the founders of the Beaumont Medical Club at Yale and gave the first paper presented before it. In 1927, Thoms became an associate professor and in 1945 he was named a full professor and chairman of the Department of Obstetrics and Gynecology, a position he held until his retirement in 1953. He became professor emeritus at Yale in 1952.

== Contributions ==
Thoms made many important contributions in his field. He devised a technique to accurately measure the pelvic inlet using x-ray pelvimetry, which previously was limited by the inability to bring the incline of the pelvic brim parallel to the horizontal x-ray plate. His view of the pelvis set the standard of his time. Thoms founded the Yale‐New Haven Infertility Clinic, the first infertility clinic in Connecticut, which was devoted to treating couples who desired but were unable to achieve conception. He was a national advocate of natural childbirth. In conjunction with Edith Jackson and members of the Department of Pediatrics, he launched a prepared-childbirth center at Grace New Haven Hospital and published scientific studies on its success. One study found that 19.3 percent of 156 women who were coached for natural childbirth did not use any drugs at all. Thoms noted that the method provided "increased safety to mother and child" and also led him to understand that husbands had an important role to play in natural childbirth. At Grace New Haven, he sponsored the plan for infant “rooming-in” with the mother, rather than in a nursery, after delivery. Thoms served as a medical advisor to the Connecticut Planned Parenthood League and was at the forefront in the successful legal fight to change Connecticut state laws that prohibited the dissemination of birth control information.

Thoms served as editor of several professional medical journals and was a prolific author of books and articles. He wrote several articles on pelvimetry. He also wrote and published widely on the early history of medicine in Connecticut. He served as an officer of the New Haven Colony Historical Society. As a teacher, he was influential in bringing to the attention of his students the importance of a humanistic approach to medicine.

He produced art in various media, especially dry points. His prints are held in many Connecticut collections.

He won the Lasker Award in 1953 for his contributions in obstetrics, marriage counseling and treatment for infertility.

== Selected publications ==
- Thoms, H., & Yale University. (1967). Yale men and landmarks in old Connecticut (1701-1815). New Haven, Conn: Yale University.
- Thoms, H. (1960). Our obstetric heritage: The story of safe childbirth. Hamden, Conn: Shoe String Press.
- Thoms, H. (1935). Classical contributions to obstetrics and gynecology. Springfield, Ill., Baltimore, Md: C.C. Thomas.
- Thoms, H. (1950). Training for childbirth: A program of natural childbirth with rooming-in. New York: McGraw-Hill.
- Thoms, H. (1962). Childbirth with understanding: A prepared childbirth program with rooming-in.
- Thoms, H. (1960). The doctors of Yale College, 1702-1815: And the founding of the Medical Institution. Hamden, Conn: Shoe String Press.
- Thoms, H. (1958). The Doctors Jared of Connecticut: Jared Eliot, Jared Potter, Jared Kirtland. Hamden, Conn: Shoe String Press.
- Thoms, H. (1942). The heritage of Connecticut medicine. New Haven: Printed by the Whaples-Bullis Company.
- Thoms, H. (1956). Pelvimetry. New York: Hoeber-Harper.
- Thoms, H. (1963). Samuel Seabury: Priest and physician, bishop of Connecticut. Hamden, Conn., London: Shoe String Press.
- Thoms, H., & Roth, L. G. (1950). Understanding natural childbirth: A book for the expectant mother. New York: McGraw-Hill.
- Thoms, H. (1961). Chapters in American obstetrics. Springfield, Ill: Thomas.
- Thoms, H. (1955). Training for childbirth: A program of natural childbirth with rooming-in. 28 minutes, silent, color (restricted to professional organizations). Association of American Medical Colleges.
