= Albert Lasker Award for Basic Medical Research =

Annual science award

The Albert Lasker Award for Basic Medical Research is one of the prizes awarded by the Lasker Foundation for a fundamental discovery that opens up a new area of biomedical science. The award frequently precedes a Nobel Prize in Medicine; almost 50% of the winners have gone on to win one.

== List of recipients ==
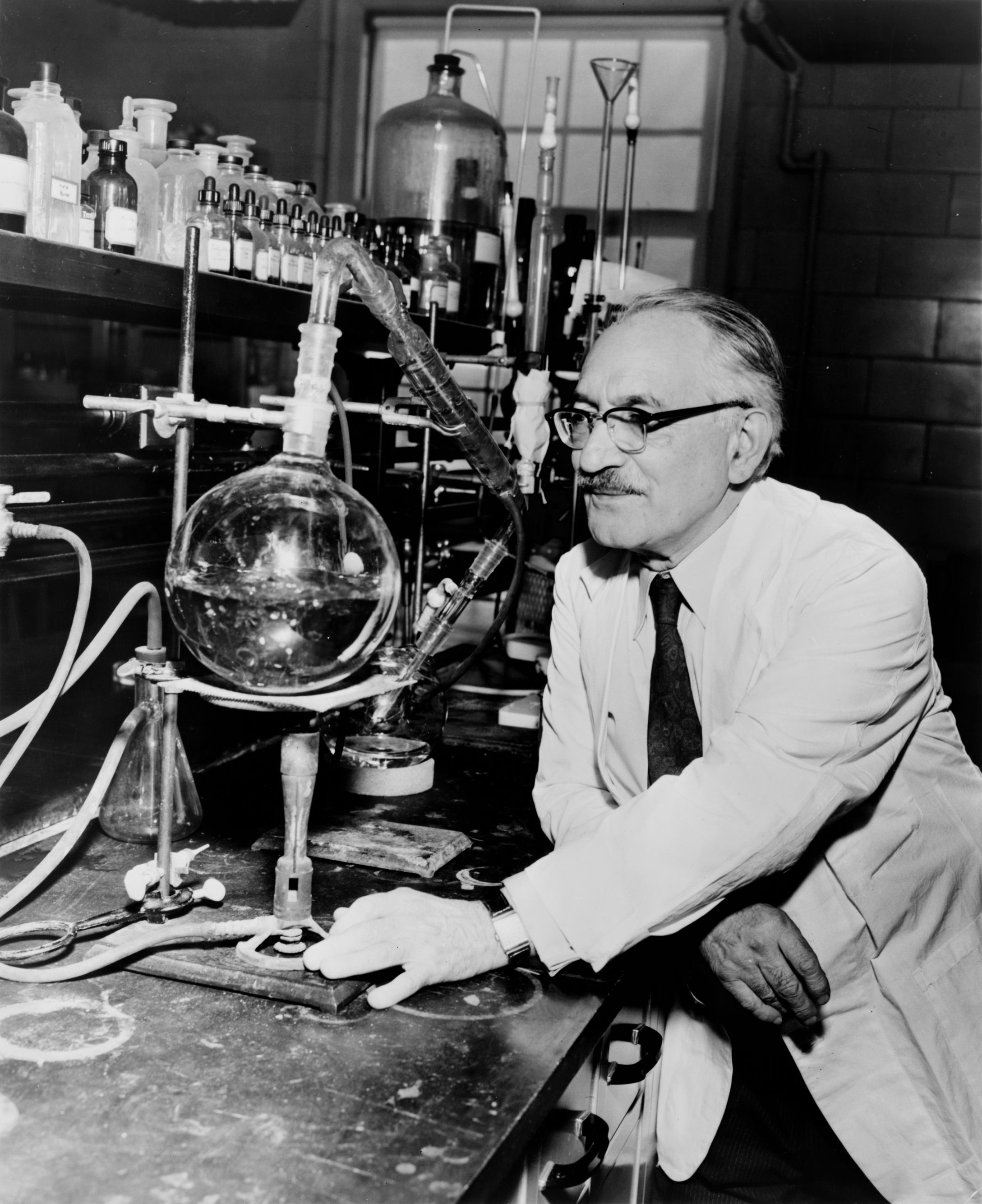
Selman Waksman

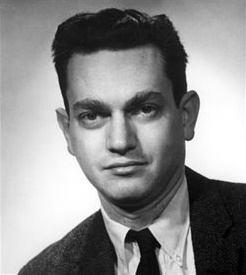
Marshall W. Nirenberg

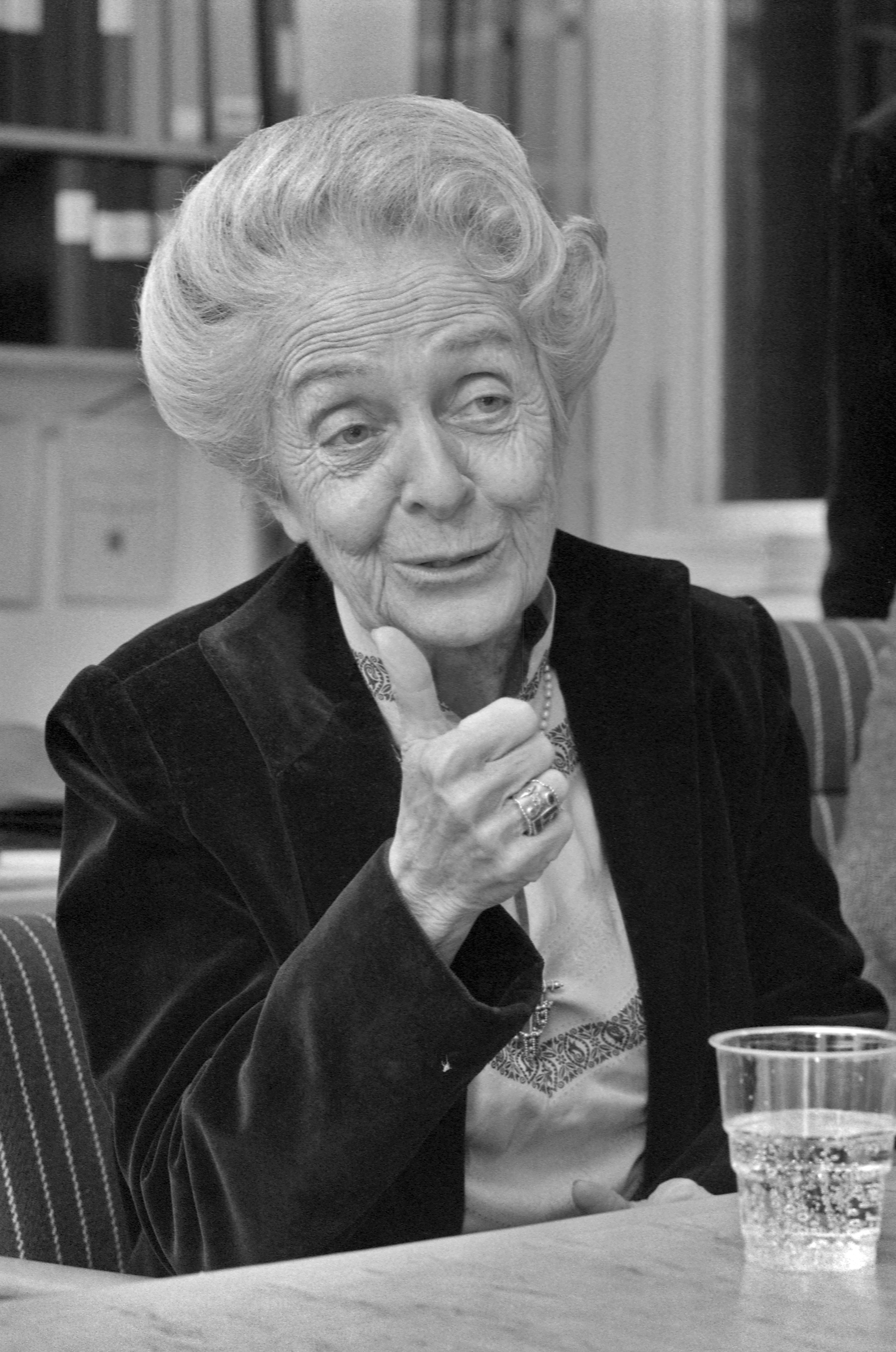
Rita Levi-Montalcini

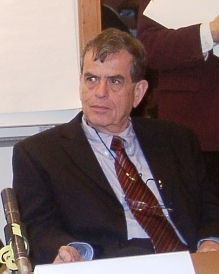
Aaron Ciechanover

2000–present
Year	Recipient
2026	Emmanuel Mignot
2026	Masashi Yanagisawa
2025	Dirk Görlich
2025	Steven L. McKnight
2024	Zhijian Chen
2023	Demis Hassabis
2023	John M. Jumper
2022	Richard O. Hynes
2022	Erkki Ruoslahti
2022	Timothy A. Springer
2021	Karl Deisseroth
2021	Peter Hegemann
2021	Dieter Oesterhelt
2020	not awarded
2019	Max Dale Cooper
2019	Jacques Miller
2018	C. David Allis
2018	Michael Grunstein
2017	Michael N. Hall
2016	William Kaelin Jr.
2016	Peter J. Ratcliffe
2016	Gregg L. Semenza
2015	Stephen J. Elledge
2015	Evelyn M. Witkin
2014	Kazutoshi Mori
2014	Peter Walter
2013	Richard H. Scheller
2013	Thomas C. Südhof
2012	Michael Sheetz
2012	James Spudich
2012	Ronald Vale
2011	Franz-Ulrich Hartl
2011	Arthur L. Horwich
2010	Douglas L. Coleman
2010	Jeffrey M. Friedman
2009	John Gurdon
2009	Shinya Yamanaka
2008	Victor R. Ambros
2008	David C. Baulcombe
2008	Gary B. Ruvkun
2007	Ralph M. Steinman
2006	Elizabeth Blackburn
2006	Carol W. Greider
2006	Jack Szostak
2005	Ernest McCulloch
2005	James Till
2004	Pierre Chambon
2004	Ronald M. Evans
2004	Elwood V. Jensen
2003	Robert G. Roeder
2002	James E. Rothman
2002	Randy W. Schekman
2001	Mario Capecchi
2001	Martin Evans
2001	Oliver Smithies
2000	Aaron Ciechanover
2000	Avram Hershko
2000	Alexander Varshavsky

1980–1999
Year	Recipient
1999	Clay Armstrong
1999	Bertil Hille
1999	Roderick MacKinnon
1998	Leland H. Hartwell
1998	Yoshio Masui
1998	Paul Nurse
1997	Mark S. Ptashne
1996	Robert F. Furchgott
1996	Ferid Murad
1995	Peter C. Doherty
1995	Jack L. Strominger
1995	Emil R. Unanue
1995	Don C. Wiley
1995	Rolf M. Zinkernagel
1994	Stanley B. Prusiner
1993	Günter Blobel
1992	not awarded
1991	Edward B. Lewis
1991	Christiane Nüsslein-Volhard
1990	not awarded
1989	Michael J. Berridge
1989	Alfred G. Gilman
1989	Edwin G. Krebs
1989	Yasutomi Nishizuka
1988	Thomas R. Cech
1988	Phillip A. Sharp
1987	Leroy Hood
1987	Philip Leder
1987	Susumu Tonegawa
1986	Rita Levi-Montalcini
1986	Stanley Cohen
1985	Michael S. Brown
1985	Joseph L. Goldstein
1984	Michael Potter
1984	Georges J. F. Köhler
1984	César Milstein
1983	Eric R. Kandel
1983	Vernon B. Mountcastle
1982	J. Michael Bishop
1982	Raymond L. Erikson
1982	Hidesaburo Hanafusa
1982	Harold E. Varmus
1982	Robert C. Gallo
1981	Barbara McClintock
1980	Paul Berg
1980	Herbert W. Boyer
1980	Stanley N. Cohen
1980	A. Dale Kaiser

1960–1979
Year	Recipient
1979	Walter Gilbert
1979	Frederick Sanger
1979	Roger Wolcott Sperry
1978	Hans W. Kosterlitz
1978	John Hughes
1978	Solomon H. Snyder
1977	K. Sune D. Bergström
1977	Bengt Samuelsson
1977	John R. Vane
1976	Rosalyn S. Yalow
1975	Roger C.L. Guillemin
1975	Andrew V. Schally
1975	Frank J. Dixon
1975	Henry G. Kunkel
1974	Ludwik Gross
1974	Howard E. Skipper
1974	Sol Spiegelman
1974	Howard M. Temin
1973	not awarded
1972	not awarded
1971	Seymour Benzer
1971	Sydney Brenner
1971	Charles Yanofsky
1970	Earl W. Sutherland
1969	Bruce Merrifield
1968	Marshall W. Nirenberg
1968	H. Gobind Khorana
1968	William F. Windle
1967	Bernard B. Brodie
1966	George E. Palade
1965	Robert W. Holley
1964	Renato Dulbecco
1964	Harry Rubin (de)
1963	Lyman C. Craig
1962	Choh H. Li
1961	not awarded
1960	M.H.F. Wilkins
1960	F.H.C. Crick
1960	James D. Watson
1960	James V. Neel
1960	L.S. Penrose
1960	Ernst Ruska
1960	James Hillier

1946–1959
Year	Recipient
1959	Albert Coons
1959	Jules Freund
1958	Peyton Rous
1958	Theodore Puck
1958	Alfred D. Hershey
1958	Gerhard Schramm (de)
1958	Heinz Fraenkel-Conrat
1958	Irvine H. Page
1957	Isaac Starr
1956	Karl Meyer
1956	Francis O. Schmitt
1955	Karl Paul Link
1955	Carl J. Wiggers
1954	Edwin B. Astwood
1954	John Franklin Enders
1954	Albert Szent-Györgyi
1953	Hans A. Krebs
1953	Michael Heidelberger
1953	George Wald
1952	Frank Macfarlane Burnet
1951	Karl Friedrich Meyer
1950	George Wells Beadle
1949	André Cournand
1949	William S. Tillett
1949	L. Royal Christensen
1948	Vincent du Vigneaud
1948	Selman Waksman
1948	René J. Dubos
1947	Oswald T. Avery
1947	Homer Smith
1946	Carl Ferdinand Cori

== See also ==
- List of biomedical science awards
