= ELife =

Open-access scientific journal

eLife
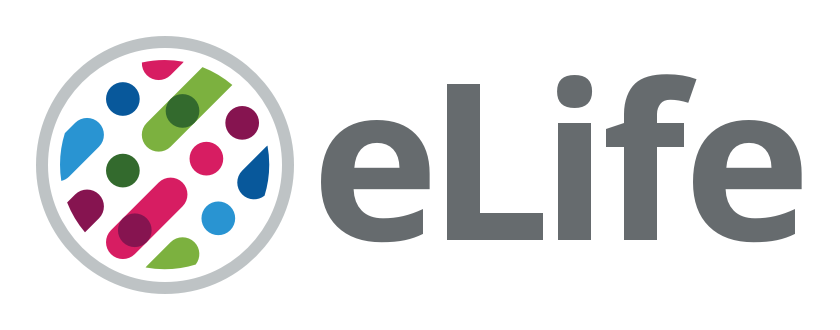
- Discipline: Biomedicine, life sciences
- Language: English
- Edited by: Tim Behrens

Publication details
- History: 2012–present
- Publisher: eLife Sciences Publications Ltd
- Frequency: Continuous
- Open access: Yes
- License: CC BY 3.0, CC BY 4.0, and CC0
- Impact factor: N/A (2024)

Standard abbreviations
- ISO 4: eLife

Indexing
- CODEN: ELIFA8
- ISSN: 2050-084X
- OCLC no.: 813236730

Links
- Journal homepage

eLife is a not-for-profit, peer-reviewed, open access, science publisher for the biomedical and life sciences. It was established at the end of 2012 by the Howard Hughes Medical Institute, Max Planck Society, and Wellcome Trust, following a workshop held in 2010 at the Janelia Farm Research Campus. Together, these organizations provided the initial funding to support the business and publishing operations. In 2016, the organizations committed US$26 million to continue publication of the journal.

Editorial decisions are made largely by senior editors and members of the board of reviewing editors, all of whom are active scientists working in fields ranging from human genetics and neuroscience to biophysics, epidemiology, and ecology.

In October 2023, eLife controversially fired chief editor Michael Eisen for retweeting a piece from satirical newspaper The Onion satirizing the Israel-Hamas conflict.

== Business model ==
eLife is a non-profit organisation, but for long-term sustainability of the service, the journal asks for an article processing charge of US$3,750 for papers accepted for publication. Authors with insufficient funding are eligible for a fee waiver.

== Abstracting and indexing ==
The journal is abstracted and indexed in Medline, BIOSIS Previews, Chemical Abstracts Service, Science Citation Index Expanded, and (for pre-2024 publications) Scopus. According to the Journal Citation Reports, the journal had a 2023 impact factor of 6.4. The journal opposes the over-reliance on the impact factor by the scientific community. In October 2024, Web of Science put its indexing of eLife in Science Citation Index Expanded on hold, citing the journal's recently-adopted publishing model as a reason for the suspension. In December 2024, Scopus announced all eLife papers published in 2024 and after would be indexed in its preprint collection, which is not included in its journal metrics.

In a 2015 interview, Howard Hughes Medical Institute then-President Robert Tjian reflected on eLife and noted, "The other big thing is, we want to kill the journal impact factor. We tried to prevent people who do the impact factors from giving us one. They gave us one anyway a year earlier than they should have. Don't ask me what it is because I truly don't want to know and don't care."

== eLife digests ==
Most research articles published in the journal include an "eLife digest", a non-technical summary of the research findings designed for a general audience. Since December 2014, the journal has been sharing a selection of the digests on the blog publishing platform Medium. eLife also publishes commentary articles called "Insights", which are also written in plainer terms than the research article, but focus more on the context of the research.

== Reviewing process ==
Randy Schekman (the first editor-in-chief) criticized Nature, Science and Cell as "luxury journals" in 2013, comparing their low acceptance levels and high impact factors with high-end "fashion designers" who deliberately inflated demand for their brand due to scarcity. During the peer review process, eLife encourages the reviewers to discuss a manuscript and agree on a common recommendation. At the time, the acceptance rate of eLife was 15.4% (2015).

In June 2018, eLife announced that it would try an innovative peer review model (for some 300 submissions) where the editorial decision to send a manuscript out for review is tantamount to offering publication to that manuscript, thereby putting the authors in control of publication after editorial screening has been passed.

In December 2020, eLife announced a new "publish, then review" model of publishing; from July 2021 the journal will only review manuscripts already available as preprints.

On October 20, 2022, eLife announced, "From next year, eLife is eliminating accept/reject decisions after peer review, instead focusing on public reviews and assessments of preprints." All papers invited for peer-review will be published on the eLife website as Reviewed Preprints, accompanied by an eLife assessment and public reviews.

== Controversial decisions ==
Following the Oct 20, 2022 announcement of the new reviewing model, some editors (including former editor-in-chief Randy Schekman) complained that the transition to the new model was too fast, and asked for compromise, threatening to resign if their concerns were not met. Other editors expressed support for the new model, and suggested that the complaints came from a small minority.

Michael Eisen (University of California, Berkeley) was the editor-in-chief, but was fired in October 2023 after tweeting a story by The Onion with the headline: "Dying Gazans Criticized For Not Using Last Words To Condemn Hamas." Eisen said "The Onion speaks with more courage, insight and moral clarity than the leaders of every academic institution put together. I wish there were a @TheOnion university". At least five of eLife's editors resigned and other scientists said they would stop participating in eLife events in solidarity with Eisen. A petition letter was organised to protest against Eisen's firing. The petition, which was signed by over 2,000 scientists, academics and researchers, said eLife 's action is having a "chilling effect" on freedom of expression in academia.

Deputy Editors Detlef Weigel and Tim Behrens were invited by the eLife Board of Directors to serve as co-Editors-in-Chief until the end of 2024. Behrens is now the chief editor.

== Other partners ==
In April 2017, eLife was one of the founding partners in the Initiative for Open Citations.

== See also ==
- List of open access journals
