= William S. Tillett =

American health science researcher

William Smith Tillett (July 10, 1892 in Charlotte, North Carolina – April 4, 1974) was an American internist and microbiologist. He is best known for the discovery of C-reactive protein and the streptokinase. He was also a professor of medicine at the New York University School of Medicine.

== Early life ==
William was born in 1892 in Charlotte, North Carolina. He earned his A. B. from the University of North Carolina in 1913 and later received his M. D. from the Johns Hopkins Medical School in 1917.

William started his academic career on the Johns Hopkins faculty. In 1937, he was designated as professor of bacteriology at N.Y.U.

== Awards ==
- 1942 Honorary degree from the University of North Carolina
- 1949 Albert Lasker Award for Basic Medical Research, together with André Cournand and L. Royal Christensen
- 1951 Member of the National Academy of Sciences
- 1951 Honorary Doctorate from the University of Chicago
- 1952 Borden Award
- 1959 Honorary Doctorate of Northwestern University
