= Dorothy T. Krieger =

Dorothy T. Krieger was an American academic and endocrine researcher who served as a professor and director of the Mount Sinai School of Medicine. Her major contribution was her discovery of treatment for Cushing's Disease.

== Early life and career ==
Kreiger was born in Brooklyn, New York. At the age of 18, she graduated with a degree from the Barnard College. In 1949, she received a medical degree from Columbia University's College of Physicians and Surgeons.

In April 1984, she received a special award, Albert Lasker Special Public Health Award, by the Albert D. and Mary Lasker Foundation.

== Personal life ==
She was married to C. Wayne Bardin and has two children.

== Awards ==
- Lasker Award (1984)
