= Freund's adjuvant =

Antigen solution emulsified in mineral oil

Freund's adjuvant is a solution of antigen emulsified in mineral oil and used as an immunopotentiator (booster). The complete form, Freund's Complete Adjuvant (FCA or CFA) is composed of inactivated and dried mycobacteria (usually M. tuberculosis), whereas the incomplete form (FIA or IFA) lacks the mycobacterial components (hence just the water in oil emulsion). It is named after Jules T. Freund.

== Regulation ==
Freund's complete adjuvant is effective in stimulating cell-mediated immunity and leads to potentiation of T helper cells that leads to the production of certain immunoglobulins and effector T cells. Its use in humans is forbidden by regulatory authorities, due to its toxicity. In animal research there are also strict guidelines associated with its use, due to its potential for pain and tissue damage. Injections of FCA should be subcutaneous or intraperitoneal, because intradermal injections may cause skin ulceration and necrosis; intramuscular injections may lead to temporary or permanent muscle lesion, and intravenous injections may produce pulmonary lipid embolism.

== Effects ==
When administered to diabetes prone non-obese diabetic (NOD) mice, Freund's complete adjuvant (FCA) prevented juvenile-onset diabetes. When combined with spleen cells, FCA was said to have reversed diabetes. In 2006, these claims were confirmed that even without spleen cells FCA can restore insulin producing beta cells in pancreas of NOD mice. Although newspapers have described the 2006 findings as confirming the earlier experiments, a report from NIH was released on November 23, 2006, in Science confirming the participation of spleen cells in reversing end-stage diabetes.

It has also been investigated in an animal model of Parkinson's disease, or as well used in emulsion with Myelin oligodendrocyte glycoprotein (MOG), a peptide inducing Experimental autoimmune encephalomyelitis (EAE) in animal studies for efficacy testing of multiple sclerosis treatments.

=== Mechanism ===
FCA is known to stimulate production of tumor necrosis factor, which is thought to kill the T-cells responsible for the autoimmune destruction of the pancreatic beta cells. Still in question is whether the regrowth of functional insulin-producing cells occurs due to differentiation and proliferation of existing pancreatic stem cells, or whether the injected spleen cells re-differentiate to an insulin-producing form. Denise Faustman, whose work has been central to developing the protocol, has suggested that both mechanisms may play a role. However, in experiments to verify and examine her work, Suri reported that DNA-based evidence yielded no sign that spleen cells were needed in pancreatic islet beta cells regeneration after the FCA treatment. In pancreatic islets the β-cells regenerate following Freund's adjuvant treatment. This is related to the induction of Th17 cells by adjuvant treatment and these cells produce Interleukin-22 (IL-22). Pancreatic islets express high levels of IL-22 receptor and IL-22 has been shown to induce islet beta cell regeneration.

== See also ==
- Immunologic adjuvant
