= Lu Chen (scientist) =

Chinese American neuroscientist

- Chinese: 陈路
- Born: 1972 (age 53–54); China
- Education: University of Southern California
- Spouse: Thomas C. Südhof
- Awards: MacArthur Fellows Program, Beckman Young Investigators Award
- Scientific career
- Fields: neuroscientist
- Workplaces: Stanford University, University of California, Berkeley
- Doctoral advisor: Richard F. Thompson

Lu Chen (Chinese: 陈路) is a Chinese-born American neuroscientist, who is a Professor of Neurosurgery, and of Psychiatry and Behavioral Sciences at Stanford University, and is a member of the Stanford Neurosciences Institute. She is a member of the editorial board of PLOS One and Frontiers in Synaptic Neuroscience, and also a former associate editor of The Journal of Neuroscience. She was previously an Associate Professor of Neurobiology and a member of the Helen Wills Neuroscience Institute at the University of California, Berkeley.

== Life ==
She was born and raised in Wuxi, Jiangsu, China. She graduated from the University of Southern California with a PhD in Neurobiology in 1998. She studied with Richard F. Thompson.

Her husband is Thomas C. Südhof, a Nobel laureate in physiology and medicine and a professor at Stanford University. Her former husband, Shaowen Bao, is a professor of neuroscience.

== Research ==
The long-term goal of Chen's research is to understand the cellular and molecular mechanisms that underlie synapse function during behavior in the developing and mature brain, and how synapse function is altered during intellectual disability. Chen discovered an important role of retinoic acid in synaptic scaling.

== Awards ==
- 2005 MacArthur Fellows Program
- 2004 Beckman Young Investigators Award
