= Claire Pomeroy =

Claire Pomeroy is the president and chief executive officer of the Albert and Mary Lasker Foundation. She is a professor emeritus at the University of California, Davis. During her academic career, her research focused on HIV/AIDS.

== Education ==
Pomeroy received her B.S. and M.D. degrees from the University of Michigan. She then did a residency in internal medicine and a fellowship in infectious diseases at the University of Minnesota. She earned an MBA from the University of Kentucky.

== Career ==
Pomeroy is currently the president and chief executive officer of the Lasker Foundation. She is also a member of the board of trustees for Morehouse School of Medicine, a member of the board of directors of the Science Philanthropy Alliance, and a member of the National Institutes of Health's Advisory Committee on Research on Women's Health.

Pomeroy joined the faculty at UC Davis in 2003 as executive associate dean. She then served as vice chancellor and dean of the UC Davis School of Medicine from 2005 to her retirement in 2013. In June 2013, she became president of the Lasker Foundation.

Pomeroy was elected to the Institute of Medicine in 2011. The University of Massachusetts Medical School awarded her an honorary doctorate of science in 2016. She was elected as a fellow of the American Association for the Advancement of Science in 2019.

Pomeroy has published more than 100 articles and book chapters.
