= Thomas C. Südhof =

German-American biochemist

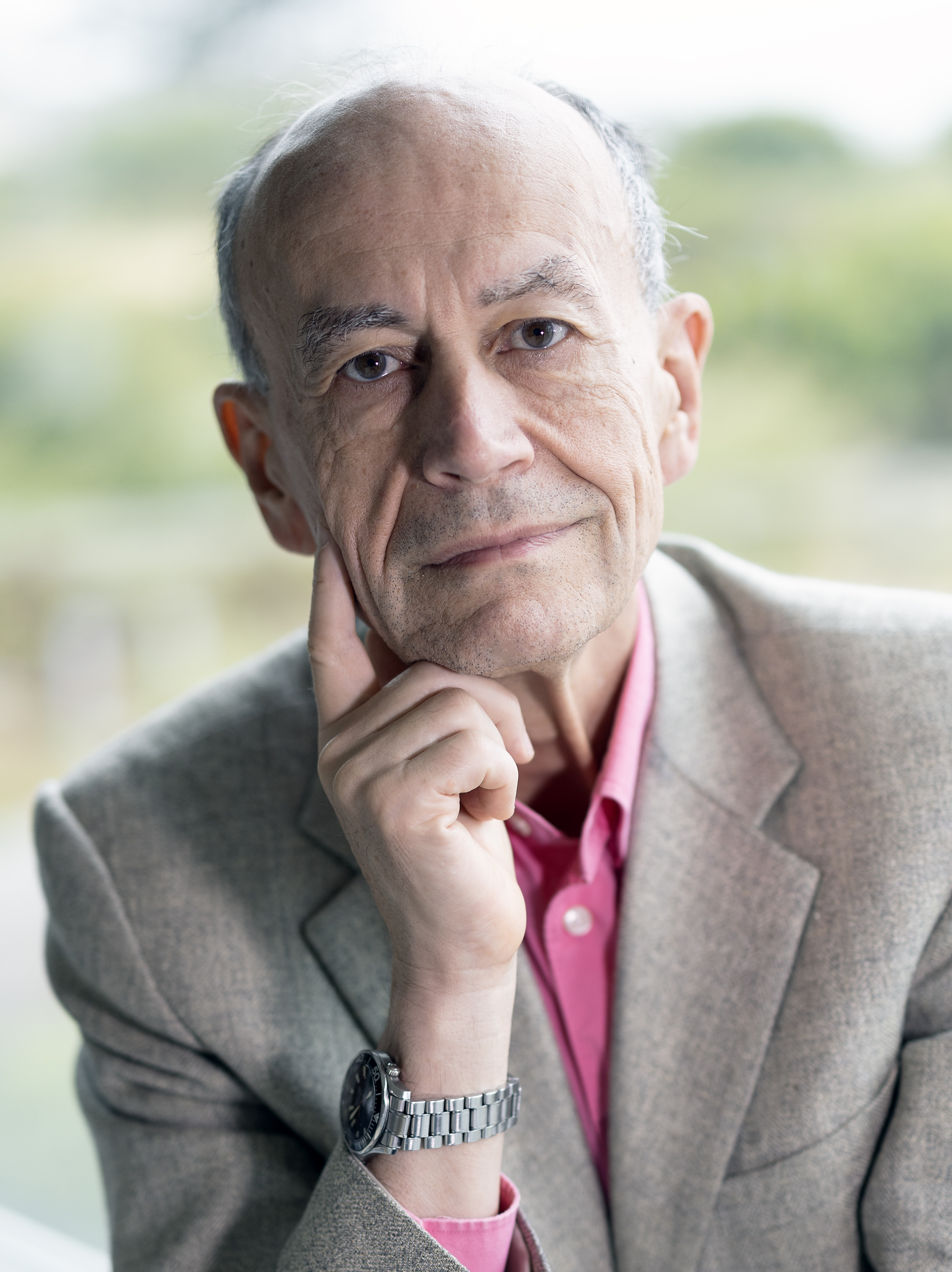
- Südhof in 2024
- Born: Thomas Christian Südhof; December 22, 1955 (age 70); Göttingen, West Germany
- Education: RWTH Aachen University; University of Göttingen (PhD)
- Known for: Presynaptic Neuron; Synaptic Transmission
- Spouse: Lu Chen
- Awards: W. Alden Spencer Award (1993); Lasker Award (2013); Nobel Prize (2013); ForMemRS (2017)
- Scientific career
- Fields: Biology
- Workplaces: Stanford University; University of Texas Southwestern Medical Center
- Thesis: Die biophysikalische Struktur der chromaffinen Granula im Lichte ihres Osmometerverhaltens und ihrer osmotischen Lyse (1982)
- Doctoral advisor: Victor P. Whittaker
- Website: hhmi.org/scientists/thomas-c-sudhof; med.stanford.edu/sudhoflab/about-thomas-sudhof.html

Thomas Christian Südhof (German pronunciation: [ˈtoːmas ˈzyːtˌhoːf]; born December 22, 1955), is a German-American biochemist known for his study of synaptic transmission. Currently, he is a professor in the school of medicine in the department of molecular and cellular physiology, and by courtesy in neurology, and in psychiatry and behavioral sciences at Stanford University.

Südhof, James Rothman and Randy Schekman are the 2013 Nobel Prize in Physiology or Medicine laureates for their work on vesicle trafficking.

== Early life and education ==
A German native, Südhof was born in Göttingen in 1955. He spent his childhood in Göttingen and Hannover. He studied music in his youth, specifically the bassoon, and has credited his bassoon instructor, Herbert Tauscher, as his "most influential teacher". He was a graduate from the Hannover Waldorf School in 1975. Südhof studied medicine at the RWTH Aachen University, Harvard University, and then the University of Göttingen. In Göttingen Südhof worked on his doctoral thesis, in which he described the structure and function of chromaffin cells, at the Max Planck Institute for Biophysical Chemistry in the lab of Victor P. Whittaker. In 1982, he received his MD in medical science (Dr.med.) from the University of Göttingen.

He was born in an anthroposophical family, but has left anthroposophy since his youth.

== Career and research ==
After a brief postdoctoral fellowship in Whittaker's lab, Südhof moved to the United States in 1983, where he began postdoctoral training in the department of molecular genetics at the University of Texas Health Science Center (now the UT Southwestern Medical Center) in Dallas, Texas, under the supervision of Michael Stuart Brown and Joseph L. Goldstein.

During his postdoctoral research fellowship, Südhof worked to describe the role of the LDL receptor in cholesterol metabolism, for which Brown and Goldstein were awarded the Nobel Prize in Physiology or Medicine in 1985. Südhof finished his postdoctoral training in 1986 and was elected to be an investigator of the Howard Hughes Medical Institute. He then established his own laboratory at UT Southwestern Medical Center where he focused on the molecular and cellular neurosciences centered on synapses for over 20 years.

In 2008, Südhof moved to Stanford University and is currently the Avram Goldstein Professor in the School of Medicine as well as a Professor of Molecular & Cellular Physiology, Psychiatry, and Neurology.

Südhof laid the foundations for his scientific career studying the synapse early while studying the mechanisms of neurotransmitter dependent hormone release from neuroendocrine cells for his doctoral thesis at the Max Planck Institute for Biophysical Chemistry. Südhof described the structure and function of chromaffin cells which are responsible for the release of epinephrine, norepinephrine and endorphins from the medulla of the adrenal gland. Innervated by sympathetic nervous system, chromaffin cells are important in the initiation of the fight-or-flight response of animals when exposed to threatening stimuli.

After completing his thesis in 1983, Südhof moved to UT Southwestern Medical Center for his postdoctoral training where he began researching in the department of molecular genetics under the supervision of Joseph L. Goldstein and Michael Stuart Brown. While a postdoctoral fellow, Südhof cloned the gene for the low-density lipoprotein receptor and, soon after, was able to explain its transcriptional regulation by cholesterol. When LDL receptors, found concentrated in the liver, bind specific free blood cholesterol, low-density lipoprotein, they are internalized and recycled removing the cholesterol from circulation. This process is a primary source of blood cholesterol regulation and variations in its efficiency were shown to be present in familial hypercholesterolemia. As a result of the discovery, LDL receptor function had also elucidated the principle of receptor-mediated endocytosis—a now universally understood process in cell biology. Goldstein and Brown were awarded the Nobel Prize in Physiology or Medicine for the discovery in 1985.

After finishing postdoctoral training, Südhof started his own laboratory at UT Southwestern in 1986. Briefly continuing work with Goldstein and Brown, Südhof helped identify a DNA element in the LDL gene that produced sterol mediated end-product repression when inserted in a viral promoter. This domain, known as a sterol regulatory sequence, directly participates in the regulation of sterol biosynthesis. Sterols are a major class of biomolecule and critical for life. Important sterols in humans include cholesterol and steroid hormones. Discovery of sterol regulatory elements and LDL receptor function led to the subsequent development of statin derived cholesterol medications such as atorvastatin (Lipitor)—the top-selling branded pharmaceutical drug in the world in 2008.

Südhof started his independent research career in neuroscience since 1986 and open the field of molecular neuroscience for synaptic transmission especially from the presynaptic nerve terminal perspective. Until Südhof began his work, majority of neuroscience research was aimed at the postsynaptic neuron and its role in learning and memory. Indeed, Thomas Südhof is credited with discovering much of the machinery mediating neurotransmitter release and presynaptic plasticity in his 21 years at UT Southwestern. Südhof began with the discovery of synaptotagmins and their role in neurotransmitter release from the presynaptic neuron. Synaptotagmin, a transmembrane protein found in neurosecretory vesicles, functions as a calcium sensor triggering vesicle fusion and neurotransmitter release. Stimulation of a neuron results in an increase in intracellular calcium concentration. After binding calcium ion to a region in its cytosolic domain, vesicular synaptotagmin promotes quick or slow neurotransmitter release from the presynaptic neuron via interaction with regulatory and fusion related proteins such as members of the SNARE complex. Südhof also discovered RIMs and Muncs (most notably Munc13 and Munc18), soluble proteins which aid in the fusion of neurotransmitter vesicles to the nerve cell membrane and play an important role in synaptic plasticity. In addition, Südhof's research uncovered the role of many other proteins facilitating vesicle binding, fusion, and resultant neurotransmitter release from the presynaptic neuron, including members of the SNARE complex: synaptobrevin, in the vesicular membrane, syntaxin, in the cell membrane, and SNAP25, which is tethered to the cytosolic side of the cell membrane via cysteine-linked palmitoyl chains and holds the complex of four helices together. Südhof was also responsible for elucidating the action of tetanus and botulinum toxins, which selectively cleave synaptobrevin and SNAP25, respectively, inhibiting vesicle fusion with the presynaptic membrane.

A second influential contribution of Südhof is on synapse formation and specifications. Südhof discovered a number of key molecules in this process such as neurexins, present on presynaptic neurons, and neuroligins, present on postsynaptic neurons, that come together to form a physical protein bridge across the synapse. The diversity in types of neurexins and neuroligins allows for a variety of unique binding opportunities between neurons and impart a specificity to synaptic connections. Additionally he also discovered or elucidated the important functions of SynCAM, Latrophilins etc. in synapse formation. In additional studies, Südhof identified mutations in these proteins as a factor in inherited autism. Südhof is striving to elucidate the mechanism by which neurexins and neuroligins locate each other to form the synapse, their transcriptional regulation, and control of their variability.

Südhof currently continues his work on synapse formation, maintenance as well as synaptic releases in his laboratory at Stanford University. Additionally, together with Marius Wernig at Stanford University, Südhof developed induced neuronal cell technology where they can use human neuronal cells derived from patients or genetically engineered with defined mutations that linked to neuropsychiatric disorders or neurodevelopmental disorders. Südhof's research has not only given the scientific community a great understanding of the processes underlying synaptic transmission and synapse formation, but has also advanced medical knowledge of mechanisms behind poorly understood diseases such as Alzheimer's, Schizophrenia, and Autism. He is currently working with a diverse group of researchers at the Howard Hughes Medical Institute to develop mouse models for mutants of synaptic genes. The project aims to drastically advance our understanding of neurological disorders. He also serves on the Research Consortium of Cure Alzheimer's Fund.

=== Science Integrity and PubPeer ===
Südhof’s work has been scrutinized extensively on PubPeer, where commenters have criticized more than 30 of Südhof papers. These posts "draw attention to potential image manipulation, data duplication, and mislabeling of figures, and question the statistical significance of results". Südhof maintains that nearly all criticisms were unfounded or allege trivial errors with no impact on scientific conclusions and that publicly available raw data fully support the conclusions because technical details were unresolvable.

Südhof has retracted two papers, a 2017 paper in Neuron and a 2023 paper in the Proceedings of the National Academy of Science.

Motivated by the intense scrutiny of his work and the realization that over the decades, his lab committed several mistakes, Südhof has initiated a general discussion on science integrity. A key question emerging is whether there is a need to publicly expose and formally correct errors in older papers if such errors have no implications for the conclusions of a paper. A broader issue is whether retractions of papers are really warranted if the overall conclusions of a paper are correct.

=== Science and policy ===
Südhof recently also engages in scientific ethics as exemplified by his recent work at PLOS Biology Truth in Science Publishing: A personal Perspective and various interviews including his discussion about music, policy and medicine with The Lancet. In 2017, he published an article in The Washington Post on basic research vs. drug development.

== Other activities ==
In 2023, Südhof was appointed by United Nations Secretary General António Guterres to the United Nations' Scientific Advisory Board.

== Awards and honors ==
- 1993 W. Alden Spencer Award from Columbia University (shared with Richard Scheller)
- 1994 Wilhelm Feldberg Award
- 1997 Roger Eckert Award Lecture, Göttingen
- 1997 U.S. National Academy Award in Molecular Biology (shared with Richard Scheller)
- 2002 Elected to the National Academy of Sciences of the U.S.A.
- 2003 Metlife Foundation Award for Medical Research in Alzheimer's Disease (shared with Roberto Malinow)
- 2004 Bristol-Myers Squibb Award for Distinguished Achievement in Neuroscience Research
- 2004 Ulf von Euler Award Lecture, Karolinska Institute
- 2007 Elected to the Institute of Medicine
- 2008 Bernhard Katz Award, Biophysical Society (shared with Reinhard Jahn)
- 2008 Passano Foundation Award
- 2010 Kavli Prize (shared with Richard Scheller and James Rothman)
- 2013 Albert Lasker Award for Basic Medical Research (shared with Richard Scheller)
- 2013 Nobel Prize in Physiology or Medicine - shared with Randy Schekman and James Rothman
- 2014 Golden Plate Award of the American Academy of Achievement
- 2017 Elected a Foreign Member of the Royal Society (ForMemRS)
- 2023 Awarded Joseph Carrier C.S.C. Science Medal from the University of Notre Dame.

== Personal life ==
Südhof is married to Lu Chen, a professor of neurosurgery and of psychiatry and behavioral sciences at Stanford University. The couple have three children. Südhof has four more children from his previous marriage with Annette Südhof.
