= Richard Scheller =

American neuroscientist

Richard H. Scheller
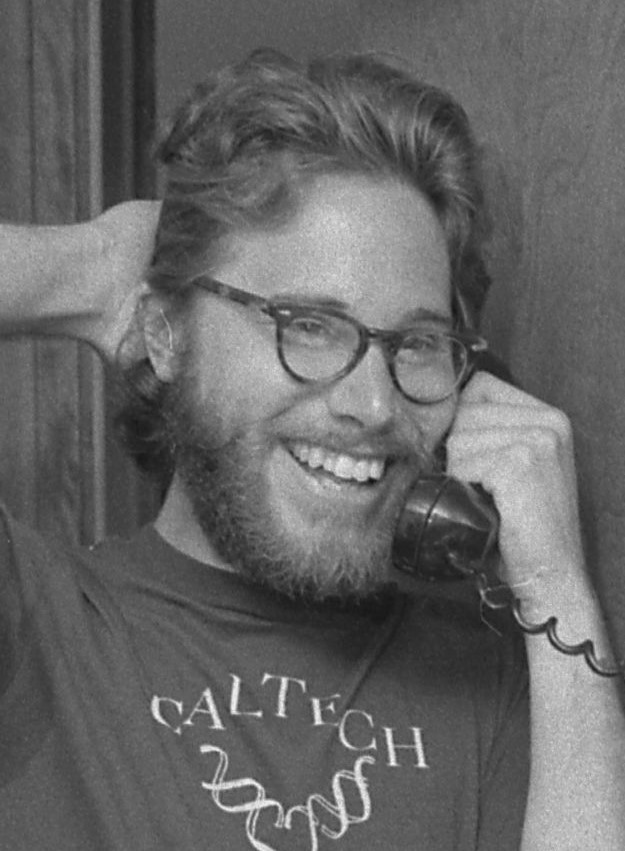
- Scheller in 1980
- Born: October 30, 1953 (age 72); Milwaukee, Wisconsin, US
- Education: University of Wisconsin–Madison, California Institute of Technology, Columbia University
- Known for: Head of gRED
- Awards: NAS Award in Molecular Biology (1997); Kavli Prize (2010); Albert Lasker Award for Basic Medical Research (2013)
- Scientific career
- Fields: Neuroscience
- Workplaces: Genentech, University of California San Francisco
- Doctoral advisor: Eric H. Davidson
- Other academic advisors: Eric Kandel, Richard Axel

Richard H. Scheller (born 30 October 1953) is the former chief science officer and head of therapeutics at 23andMe and the former executive vice president of research and early development at Genentech. He was a professor at Stanford University from 1982 to 2001 before joining Genentech. He has been awarded the Alan T. Waterman Award in 1989, the W. Alden Spencer Award in 1993 and the NAS Award in Molecular Biology in 1997, won the 2010 Kavli Prize in Neuroscience with Thomas C. Südhof and James E. Rothman, and won the 2013 Albert Lasker Award for Basic Medical Research with Thomas Südhof. He was also given the Life Sciences Distinguished Alumni Award from University of Wisconsin–Madison. He is a Fellow of the American Academy of Arts and Sciences and a Member of the National Academy of Sciences.

== Biography ==
He earned his B.S. in biochemistry from the University of Wisconsin–Madison and his Ph.D. in chemistry from the California Institute of Technology under the guidance of Eric H. Davidson. While a graduate student, he worked with Keiichi Itakura and Arthur Riggs to help synthesize Somatostatin for Herb Boyer at Genentech. After finishing his graduate studies, he did a brief postdoc with Davidson and later with Eric Kandel and Richard Axel at Columbia University. While at Columbia, he extended his previous work with recombinant DNA to identify the egg-laying hormone (ELH) gene family of neuropeptides.

Scheller joined the Stanford University faculty in the Department of Biological Sciences in 1982 and later the Department of Molecular and Cellular Physiology. He was an investigator with the Howard Hughes Medical Institute from 1990 to 2001. While at Stanford, he cloned and identified the proteins that control neurotransmitter release notably those in the Syntaxin family of transport proteins, Rab GTPases, and SNAREs.

In 2001, he was recruited from Stanford to join Genentech as a senior vice president and chief research officer, replacing Dennis Henner. In 2008, was named the chief scientific officer and executive vice president of research. After the acquisition of Genentech by Hoffmann-La Roche, he was appointed the head of Genentech research and early development and a member of the enlarged Roche Corporate Executive Committee. He is concurrently an adjunct professor in the Department of Biochemistry and Biophysics at the University of California San Francisco.

In March 2015, Scheller joined 23andMe as the chief scientific officer and head of therapeutics, creating and leading their therapeutics team, which translates genetic data into discovery and development of new drug therapies.

Scheller is also known as an expert and enthusiastic collector of traditional and historical African art, since the 1980s. An article about his passion for African art appeared in Tribal Arts Magazine, and some of his extensive collection was exhibited and published with the 2015 show entitled "Embodiments" at the De Young Museum in San Francisco.

== Awards ==
- 1989 – Alan T. Waterman Award
- 1993 – W. Alden Spencer Award
- 1997 – NAS Award in Molecular Biology
- Life Sciences Distinguished Alumni Award from University of Wisconsin-Madison
- 2010 – Kavli Prize in Neuroscience
- 2013 – Albert Lasker Award for Basic Medical Research
- 2014 – Distinguished Alumni Award from California Institute of Technology
- 2015 – National Academies of Science
- Fellow of the Norwegian Academy of Science and Letters

== Personal life ==
He is married to Susan McConnell, a professor in the Department of Biology at Stanford University, and lives on Stanford Campus.
