= James Rothman =

American biologist and Nobel laureate

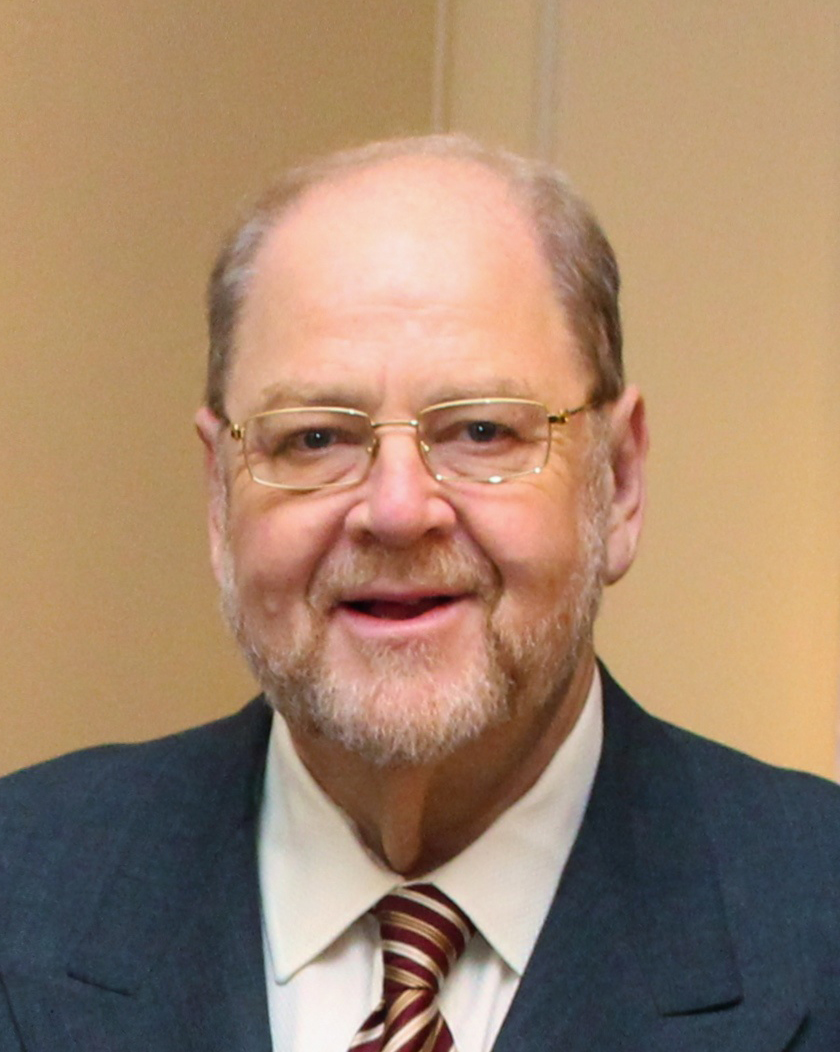
- Rothman in 2013
- Born: James Edward Rothman; November 3, 1950 (age 75); Haverhill, Massachusetts, U.S.
- Education: Yale University (BA); Harvard University (PhD)
- Awards: Heinrich Wieland Prize (1990); Rosenstiel Award (1993); Richard Lounsbery Award (1997); Louisa Gross Horwitz Prize (2002); Albert Lasker award (2002); E. B. Wilson Medal (2010); Nobel Prize in Physiology or Medicine (2013)
- Scientific career
- Fields: Cell biology
- Workplaces: Yale University; Columbia University; University College London; Memorial Sloan Kettering Cancer Center; Princeton University; Stanford University
- Thesis: Transbilayer asymmetry and its maintenance in biological membranes (1976)
- Academic advisors: Harvey Lodish
- Website: medicine.yale.edu/profile/james-rothman/

James Edward Rothman (born November 3, 1950) is an American biochemist. He is the Fergus F. Wallace Professor of Biomedical Sciences at Yale University, the chairman of the Department of Cell Biology at Yale School of Medicine, and the director of the Nanobiology Institute at the Yale West Campus. Rothman also concurrently serves as adjunct professor of physiology and cellular biophysics at Columbia University and a research professor at the UCL Queen Square Institute of Neurology, University College London.

Rothman was awarded the 2013 Nobel Prize in Physiology or Medicine, for his work on vesicle trafficking (shared with Randy Schekman and Thomas C. Südhof). He received many other honors including the King Faisal International Prize in 1996, the Louisa Gross Horwitz Prize from Columbia University and the Albert Lasker Award for Basic Medical Research both in 2002.

== Education ==
Rothman earned his high school diploma from Pomfret School in 1967, then received his B.A. in physics at Yale University in 1971 and his Ph.D. in biological chemistry at Harvard in 1976 working with Eugene Patrick Kennedy.

== Career and research ==
Following his Ph.D., Rothman did postdoctoral research with Harvey Lodish at Massachusetts Institute of Technology working on glycosylation of membrane proteins. He moved to the Department of Biochemistry at Stanford University in 1978. He was at Princeton University, from 1988 to 1991, before coming to New York to found the Department of Cellular Biochemistry and Biophysics at Memorial Sloan-Kettering Cancer Center, where he also served as vice-chairman of Sloan-Kettering Institute. In 2003, he left Sloan-Kettering to become a professor of physiology at Columbia University's College of Physicians and Surgeons and the head of Columbia's Center for Chemical Biology. He moved from Columbia to Yale in 2008, retaining a part-time appointment at Columbia. Since 2013 he is also holding a position as Distinguished Professor-in-Residence at the Shanghai Institute for Advanced Immunochemical Studies of ShanghaiTech University.

In 1995, Rothman joined the Amersham plc scientific advisory board. When Amersham was acquired by GE Healthcare in 2003, Rothman was appointed as the Chief Science Advisor to GE Healthcare.

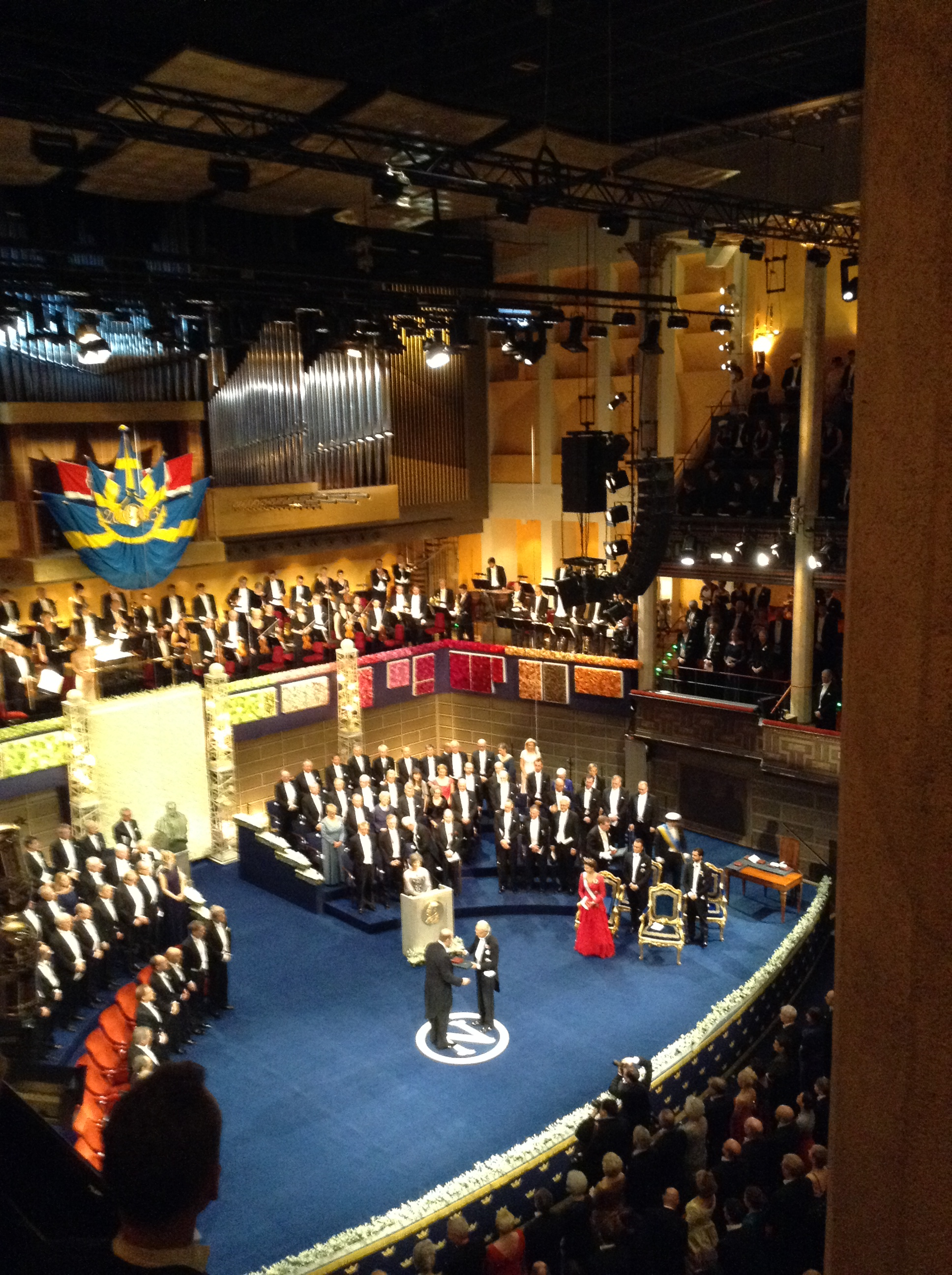
Nobel Prize Ceremony: James Rothman receives his award from king of Sweden.

Rothman's research details how vesicles—tiny sac-like structures that transport hormones, growth factors, and other molecules within cells—know how to reach their correct destination and where and when to release their contents. This cellular trafficking underlies many critical physiological functions, including the propagation of the cell itself in division, communication between nerve cells in the brain, secretion of insulin and other hormones in the body, and nutrient uptake. Defects in this process lead to a wide variety of conditions, including diabetes and botulism.

His former postdoctoral students include Gero Miesenböck (postdoc) and Suzanne Pfeffer.

=== Awards and honors ===
Rothman was awarded the 2010 Kavli Prize Neuroscience together with Richard Scheller and Thomas C. Südhof for "discovering the molecular basis of neurotransmitters release".

Rothman was awarded the 2013 Nobel Prize in Physiology or Medicine together with Randy Schekman and Thomas C. Südhof for "their discoveries of machinery regulating vesicle traffic, a major transport system in our cells."

Rothman is a Member of the National Academy of Sciences and its Institute of Medicine.

== Personal life ==
He is the son of Martin Rothman, a pediatrician, and Gloria Hartnick, both Jewish.

== See also ==
- List of Jewish Nobel laureates
