= Randy Schekman =

American cell biologist

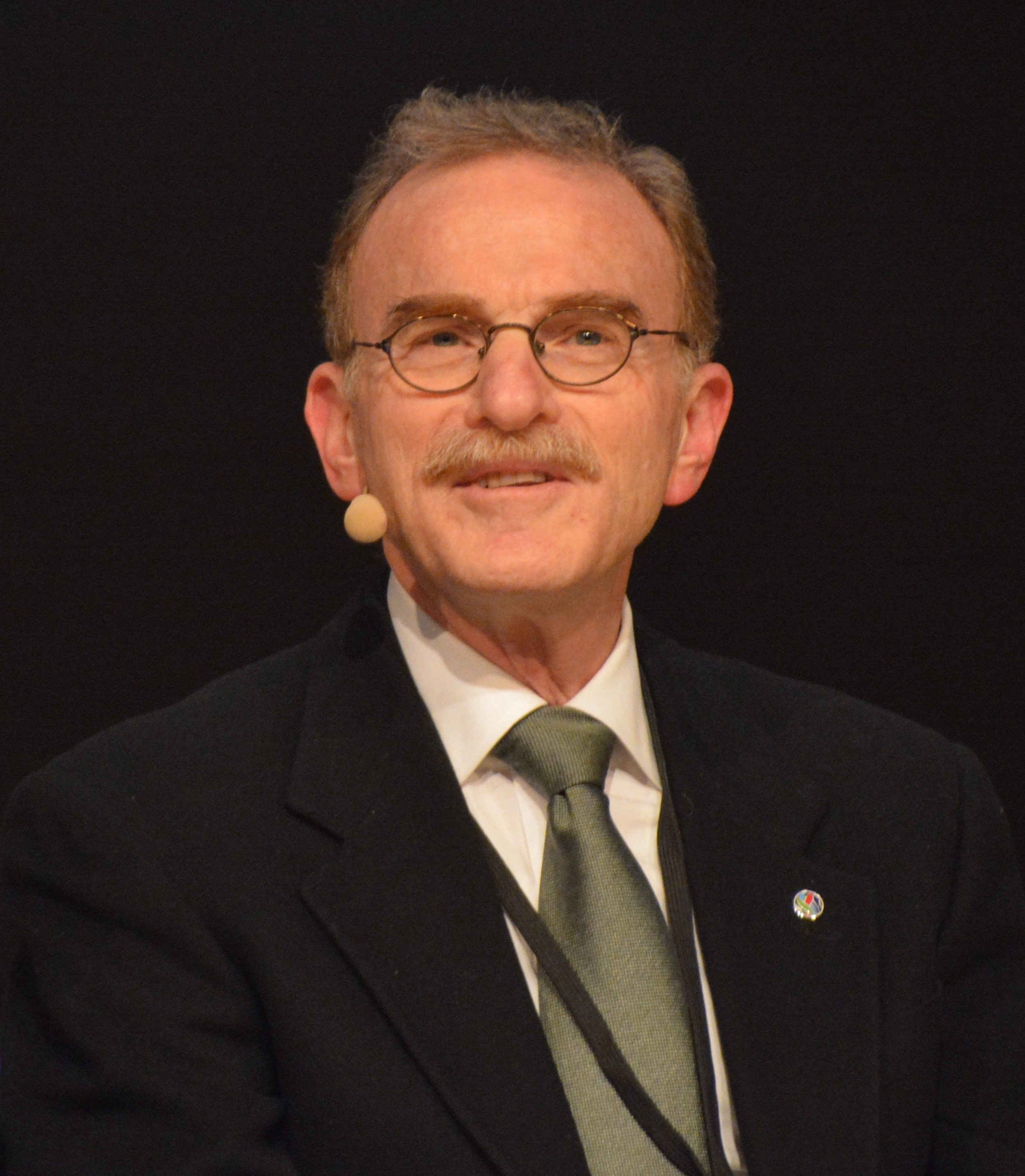
- Schekman in 2015
- Born: Randy Wayne Schekman; December 30, 1948 (age 77); Saint Paul, Minnesota, U.S.
- Education: University of California, Los Angeles (BA); Stanford University (PhD)
- Known for: Editor-in-chief of PNAS and eLife
- Awards: Member of the National Academy of Sciences (1992); Rosenstiel Award (1993); Gairdner Foundation International Award (1996); Lasker award (2002); Louisa Gross Horwitz Prize (2002); Massry Prize (2010); E. B. Wilson Medal (2010); ForMemRS (2013); Nobel Prize in Physiology or Medicine (2013)
- Scientific career
- Workplaces: University of California, Berkeley; UCLA; Howard Hughes Medical Institute; Stanford University
- Thesis: Resolution and reconstruction of a multienzyme DNA replication reaction (1975)
- Doctoral advisor: Arthur Kornberg
- Doctoral students: David Julius; David Baker
- Website: mcb.berkeley.edu/labs/schekman royalsociety.org/people/randy-schekman

Randy Wayne Schekman (born December 30, 1948) is an American cell biologist at the University of California, Berkeley, former editor-in-chief of Proceedings of the National Academy of Sciences and former editor of Annual Review of Cell and Developmental Biology. In 2011, he was announced as the editor of eLife, a new high-profile open-access journal published by the Howard Hughes Medical Institute, the Max Planck Society and the Wellcome Trust, launching in 2012. He was elected to the National Academy of Sciences in 1992. Schekman shared the 2013 Nobel Prize for Physiology or Medicine with James Rothman and Thomas C. Südhof for their ground-breaking work on cell membrane vesicle trafficking.

== Early life and education ==
Schekman was born in Saint Paul, Minnesota, to Alfred Schekman, an electrical engineer and computer software designer and Esther (Bader) Schekman. His family were Jewish emigrants from Russia and Bessarabia. In the late 1950s his family moved to the new suburban community of Rossmoor, located in Orange County next to Long Beach.

He graduated from Western High School in Anaheim, California, in 1966. He received a BA in molecular biology from the University of California, Los Angeles (UCLA), in 1971. He spent his third year at the University of Edinburgh in Scotland, as an exchange student. He received a PhD in 1975 from Stanford University for research on DNA replication, working with Arthur Kornberg. After joining the faculty at University of California Berkeley, he was promoted to associate professor in 1981, and professor in 1984. Schekman was married to Nancy Walls, now deceased.

== Research and career ==
Since 1991, Schekman has been a Howard Hughes Medical Institute Investigator, Division of Biochemistry and Molecular Biology, Department of Molecular and Cell Biology, at the University of California, Berkeley. The Schekman Lab at that university carries out research into molecular descriptions of the process of membrane assembly and vesicular traffic in eukaryotic cells including yeast. Before that, he was a faculty member with the now disbanded Department of Biochemistry at the same university.

=== Awards and honors ===
In 1987 Schekman received the Eli Lilly Award in Microbiology. In 1992, he was elected a Member of the National Academy of Sciences. In 2002, Schekman received the Albert Lasker Award for Basic Medical Research and Louisa Gross Horwitz Prize of Columbia University, along with James Rothman, for their discovery of cellular membrane trafficking, a process that cells use to organize their activities and communicate with their environment. In 2008, he was named the first Miller Senior Fellow of the Miller Institute at the University of California Berkeley. That same year, he was elected to the American Philosophical Society. He was awarded the Massry Prize by the Keck School of Medicine, University of Southern California, in 2010. Schekman serves as a member of the Selection Committee and then as chair of Life Science and Medicine which chooses winners of the Shaw Prize.

Schekman was elected a Foreign Member of the Royal Society (ForMemRS) in 2013. His nomination reads:

Using a brilliantly conceived genetic screen, Schekman isolated sec mutants that accumulate secretory pathway intermediates, he cloned the corresponding genes and he established biochemical reactions that faithfully reproduced specific secretory pathway events. These studies transformed the secretion field, previously descriptive and morphological, into a molecular and mechanistic one. The cell-free reactions that Schekman established led to his isolation of the Sec61 translocation complex, the (COPII) vesicle coat complex, and the first purified inter-organelle transport vesicles. The Sec proteins are strikingly conserved and the trafficking mechanisms that Schekman discovered are at the heart of neurotransmission, hormone secretion, cholesterol homeostasis and metabolic regulation.

Schekman, Thomas C. Südhof, and James Rothman were awarded the 2013 Nobel Prize for Physiology or Medicine "for their discoveries of machinery regulating vesicle traffic, a major transport system in our cells". Schekman donated his share of the prize money, $400,000, to create an endowment for the Esther and Wendy Schekman Chair in Basic Cancer Biology at UC Berkeley. Schekman's mother and sister, for whom the post is named, both died of cancer.

In 2017, Schekman received the Golden Plate Award of the American Academy of Achievement.

In 2021, Schekman was elected honorary member of the Academy of Sciences of Moldova, with which he has been collaborating since 2019.

In 2023, he was awarded the title of Doctor Honoris Causa at Nicolae Testemitanu State University of Medicine and Pharmacy of the Republic of Moldova.

== Open-access science ==
In December 2013, Schekman called for academic journal publishing reform and open access science publication by announcing that his lab at the University of California, Berkeley would no longer submit to the prestigious closed-access journals Nature, Cell, and Science, citing their self-serving and deleterious effects on science. He has criticized these journals for artificially restricting the number of publications accepted to drive up demand. In addition, Schekman says the journals accept papers that will be cited often, increasing the prestige of the journal, rather than those which demonstrate important results. He has said the prestige and difficulty of publishing in these journals sometimes cause scientists to cut corners or pursue trends, rather than conduct research on important questions. Schekman is the former editor of eLife, an open access journal and competitor to Nature, Cell, and Science. Papers are accepted into eLife based on review by working scientists. Access to accepted papers is free.

== Parkinson's disease ==
In the fall of 2017, Schekman's wife, Nancy Walls, died after a 20-year struggle with Parkinson's disease. Near the end of this period, Schekman was enlisted to serve as the scientific director of a new effort called ASAP, aimed at organizing an international program of collaborative research on the origins and mechanisms of progression of Parkinson's disease. In cooperation with The Michael J. Fox Foundation and major philanthropic support, ASAP had grown by 2022 to involve 35 teams across 165 laboratories around the world. The goal of ASAP is bridge the talents of hundreds of scientists to develop novel insights leading to more effective treatments of this disease.

== See also ==
- List of Jewish Nobel laureates

Academic offices
Preceded by Elizabeth Blackburn	ASCB Presidents; 1999	Succeeded by Richard Hynes
Preceded by Nicholas R. Cozzarelli	PNAS editor-in-chief 2006–2011	Succeeded by Inder Verma
Preceded by —	eLife editor-in-chief 2012–2019	Succeeded by Michael Eisen
