= Pierre Chambon =

French molecular biologist (1931–2026)

- Born: 7 February 1931; Mulhouse, France
- Died: 5 May 2026 (aged 95); Strasbourg, France
- Known for: Nuclear hormone receptors
- Awards: Member of the European Molecular Biology Organization (1975); Member of the Academia Europaea (1988); CNRS Gold Medal (1979); Louisa Gross Horwitz Prize (1999 and 2018); Commander of the Legion of Honor; Commander of the National Order of Merit; Grand Officer of the National Order of Merit
- Scientific career
- Workplaces: Institute for Genetics and Cellular and Molecular Biology

Pierre Chambon (French pronunciation: [pjɛʁ ʃɑ̃bɔ̃]; 7 February 1931 – 5 May 2026) was a French molecular biologist who the founder of the Institute for Genetics and Cellular and Molecular Biology in Strasbourg, France. He was one of the leading molecular biologists who utilized gene cloning and sequencing technology to first decipher the structure of eukaryotic genes and their modes of regulation. Chambon published over 1,000 scientific articles. His major contributions to science include the identification of RNA polymerase II (B) (Note: Chambon named his three polymerases A, B, C. The now-more-common designations I, II, III were the nomenclature used by Robert G. Roeder and William J. Rutter.), the identification of transcriptional control elements, the cloning and dissection of nuclear hormone receptors and the revealing of their structure and demonstrating how they contribute to human physiology. His group was also one of the first to demonstrate, biochemically and electron-microscopically, that the nucleosome is the smallest unit of chromatin (Cell, Vol. 4, 281–300, 1975). He accomplished much of his work from the 1970s to the 1990s.

== Important discoveries ==
1. Discovery of a new polynucleotide, polyADP-ribose (1963)
2. Discovery of the multiplicity of RNA polymerases in eukaryotes (1969)
3. Contribution to the elucidation of the structure of active and inactive chromatin (the nucleosome) (1975)
4. Discovery that histones are responsible for the supercoiling of DNA in chromatin (1975)
5. Discovery of split genes in animal genomes (1977)
6. Characterization of promoter elements of eukaryotic protein-coding genes and discovery of the "enhancer" element (1980–1987)
7. Cloning of estrogen and progesterone receptors; elucidation of the mechanism of action of steroid hormones at the level of gene expression (1985–1990)
8. Discovery of nuclear receptors for retinoids (1987–)
9. Discovery of the nuclear receptor superfamily, their three-dimensional structure, molecular mechanism of action, and their physiological and pathophysiological functions at the cellular and organismal levels (1987–)
10. Discovery of a method allowing somatic mutations to be induced in mice at a chosen time and in a specific tissue or cell type.

== Honors and memberships ==
Chambon was elected a Foreign Associate of the US National Academy of Sciences and to the French Académie des Sciences in 1985, a foreign member of the Royal Swedish Academy of Sciences in 1987. He was awarded the Louisa Gross Horwitz Prize from Columbia University in 1999 and a second time in 2018. In 2003 he was awarded the March of Dimes Prize in Developmental Biology. He received the Albert Lasker Award for Basic Medical Research in 2004 for his work in the field. In 2010, Chambon was awarded the Gairdner Foundation International Award "for the elucidation of fundamental mechanisms of transcription in animal cells and to the discovery of the nuclear receptor superfamily". He was a founding member of the University of Strasbourg Institute for Advanced Study (USIAS), where he held the permanent Chair of Molecular Genetics and Biology.

== Life ==
Chambon was born in Mulhouse, France, in 1931.

He co-founded Transgene S.A., one of the first biotechnology companies in France, in 1979.

Chambon died in Strasbourg on 5 May 2026, at the age of 95.
