= Bert W. O'Malley =

American endocrinologist (1936–2025)

- Born: December 9, 1936; Pittsburgh, Pennsylvania, U.S.
- Died: November 2025 (aged 88)
- Education: University of Pittsburgh (BSc, MD), Duke University (Residency in Internal Medicine), National Institutes of Health (Research Training)
- Known for: Discovery of coactivators in gene expression regulation, Advances in understanding hormone action at the molecular level, Development of therapeutic strategies for cancer and metabolic diseases
- Awards: National Medal of Science (2008), Elected member of the National Academies of Sciences, Medicine, and Inventors, Over 65 honors and major awards
- Scientific career
- Fields: Molecular Endocrinology, Gene Regulation, Steroid Receptor-Coactivator Action
- Workplaces: Vanderbilt University, Baylor College of Medicine

Bert W. O'Malley (December 9, 1936 – November 11, 2025) was an American endocrinologist. He was born in 1936 in the Garfield section of Pittsburgh, Pennsylvania. He received his early education at Catholic primary schools and Central Catholic High School, before pursuing higher education at the University of Pittsburgh, where he completed both his undergraduate and medical studies, graduating first in his class. It was here that he met Sally, who would become his wife and lifelong partner. The couple went on to have four children.

After completing his medical degree, O'Malley moved to Duke University for residency training in Internal Medicine, followed by advanced clinical endocrine and research training at the National Institutes of Health's National Cancer Institute (NIH-NCI). During his time at NIH, O'Malley made significant contributions to endocrinology by utilizing the chick oviduct as a model to study how female sex steroids induce the synthesis of ovalbumin and avidin proteins, thus advancing the understanding of hormone regulation in endocrine organs.

In 1969, O'Malley joined Vanderbilt University as the Lucious Birch Professor. His research during the 1960s, a time of various competing theories on hormone function in cells, led him to be the first to demonstrate in 1972 that hormones act on DNA to induce changes in gene expression and specific mRNAs, which in turn direct all target cell functions and growth. This ground-breaking work provided clarity in the field and set the stage for future research on hormone action mediated gene expression and pharmaceutical development.

O'Malley's career took another significant turn in 1972 when he moved to Baylor College of Medicine in Houston, taking on the role of the Tom Thompson Distinguished Leadership Professor and Chair of Molecular and Cellular Biology. In 2019, he assumed the position of Chancellor at Baylor College of Medicine, marking a distinguished career in medical research and education. Throughout his career, O'Malley's contributions have been instrumental in advancing the understanding of hormone action at the molecular level, impacting both basic sciences and clinical practices.

== Middle scientific career ==
In his research, he proposed that nuclear receptors function as transcription factors that regulate mRNA production in target cells in response to intracellular hormones. This hypothesis led him to uncover the detailed mechanisms activating steroid nuclear receptors (NRs) through the discovery of previously unidentified coactivators necessary for receptor-dependent gene transcription. In 1995, he successfully cloned the first coactivator, SRC-1, marking a significant advancement in the field. His identification of coactivators as critical elements in the regulation of the mammalian genome has significantly enhanced our molecular understanding of hormone action, including the effects of agonist and antagonist ligands and selective estrogen receptor modulators (SERMs).

Over the course of more than 300 subsequent scholarly articles, his work underscored the crucial role of coactivators in a wide range of physiological processes and diseases, including genetics, reproduction, metabolism, inflammation, cardiovascular and central nervous system (CNS) functions, with a particular emphasis on cancer research. His laboratory's publication of the first structures of full-length estrogen receptor (ER)/SRC3/p300, androgen receptor (AR)/SRC2/p300, and progesterone receptor (PR)/SRC3/p300 complexes bound to DNA are considered landmark contributions to the field. Following these discoveries, he further explored the potential of coactivator- targeted approaches in medicine.

== Later career ==
Bert O'Malley's early research greatly advanced the understanding of nuclear coactivator proteins and their role in the dysfunction of transcription processes associated with metabolic diseases, degeneration of the heart and brain, and notably, cancers. His work elucidated the structure and function of mammalian coregulator complexes, revealing their critical roles in transcription, oncogenic diseases, and tissue repair. This research paved the way for exploring coactivator-dependent therapies, with his laboratory discovering small molecule drugs aimed at regulating coactivators to address conditions such as cancer, metabolic diseases, stroke, and heart failure.

Further investigations led O'Malley to identify a crucial function of the SRC-3 coactivator in immune T-regulatory cells, which play a protective role against autoimmunity but can also suppress the immune system's ability to kill cancer cells. His team developed a mouse model with the SRC-3 gene specifically deleted in T-regulatory cells, finding that this modification allowed T-conventional attack cells to effectively eliminate tumors. His lab's breakthrough demonstrated that these genetically modified animals exhibited a remarkable resistance to major cancers throughout their lifespan. O'Malley's group went on to pioneer a coactivator-centric adoptive cell transfer technique aimed at cancer treatment, showing that a single injection of SRC-3-deleted T-regulatory cells could permanently eliminate existing cancers without detectable toxicity. This method has been patented and will be developed by CoRegen-BCM for clinical application.

Until his death, O'Malley led the Baylor Center for Coregulator Research, along with Drs. David Lonard, Sang-Jun Han, and Clifford Dacso. His contributions to the field of Endocrinology earned him recognition as the Father of Molecular Endocrinology.

He was an elected member of the National Academies: of Sciences, of Medicine, and of Inventors. O'Malley received over 65 honors and major awards, including the National Medal of Science in 2008. Throughout his career, he mentored more than 220 scientists, published over 750 papers, and held 33 patents related to gene regulation, molecular endocrinology, steroid receptor-coactivator action, and molecular and cell-based medical therapies.

== Death ==
O'Malley's death at the age of 88 was announced on November 11, 2025.

== Publications ==
Early career

- Chan, Lawrence; Means, Anthony R.; O'Malley, Bert W. (June 1973). "Rates of Induction of Specific Translatable Messenger RNAs for Ovalbumin and Avidin by Steroid Hormones". Proceedings of the National Academy of Sciences. 70 (6): 1870–1874. Bibcode:1973PNAS...70.1870C. doi:10.1073/pnas.70.6.1870. ISSN 0027-8424. PMC 433615. PMID 4515943.
- Yi, P.; Wang, Z.; Feng, Q.; Pintilie, G. D.; Foulds, C. E.; Lanz, R. B.; Ludtke, S. J.; Schmid, M. F.; Chiu, W.; O'Malley, B. W. (2015). "Structure of a Biologically Active Estrogen Receptor-Coactivator Complex on DNA". Molecular Cell. 57 (6): 1047–1058. doi:10.1016/j.molcel.2015.01.025. PMC 4369429. PMID 25728767.

Middle career

- Yi, P.; Wang, Z.; Feng, Q.; Pintilie, G. D.; Foulds, C. E.; Lanz, R. B.; Ludtke, S. J.; Schmid, M. F.; Chiu, W.; O'Malley, B. W. (2015). "Structure of a Biologically Active Estrogen Receptor-Coactivator Complex on DNA". Molecular Cell. 57 (6): 1047–1058. doi:10.1016/j.molcel.2015.01.025. PMC 4369429. PMID 25728767.
- Song, X.; Chen, H.; Zhang, C.; Yu, Y.; Chen, Z.; Liang, H.; Van Buren g, I. I.; McElhany, A. L.; Fisher, W. E.; Lonard, D. M.; O'Malley, B. W.; Wang, J. (2018). "SRC-3 inhibition blocks tumor growth of pancreatic ductal adenocarcinoma". Cancer Letters. 442: 310–319. doi:10.1016/j.canlet.2018.11.012. PMC 6311429. PMID 30423406.

Later career

- McClendon, Lisa K.; Garcia, Roberto L.; Lazaro, Tyler; Robledo, Ariadna; Vasandani, Viren; Luna, Zean Aaron Evan; Rao, Abhijit S.; Srivatsan, Aditya; Lonard, David M.; Dacso, Clifford C.; Kan, Peter; O'Malley, Bert W. (December 1, 2022). "A steroid receptor coactivator small molecule "stimulator" attenuates post-stroke ischemic brain injury". Frontiers in Molecular Neuroscience. 15. doi:10.3389/fnmol.2022.1055295. ISSN 1662-5099. PMC 9751323. PMID 36533127.
- Han, Sang Jun; Jain, Prashi; Gilad, Yosef; Xia, Yan; Sung, Nuri; Park, Mi Jin; Dean, Adam M.; Lanz, Rainer B.; Xu, Jianming; Dacso, Clifford C.; Lonard, David M.; O'Malley, Bert W. (June 6, 2023). "Steroid receptor coactivator 3 is a key modulator of regulatory T cell–mediated tumor evasion". Proceedings of the National Academy of Sciences. 120 (23) e2221707120. Bibcode:2023PNAS..12021707H. doi:10.1073/pnas.2221707120. ISSN 0027-8424. PMC 10266015. PMID 37253006.
