= Elwood V. Jensen =

American biologist (1920–2012)

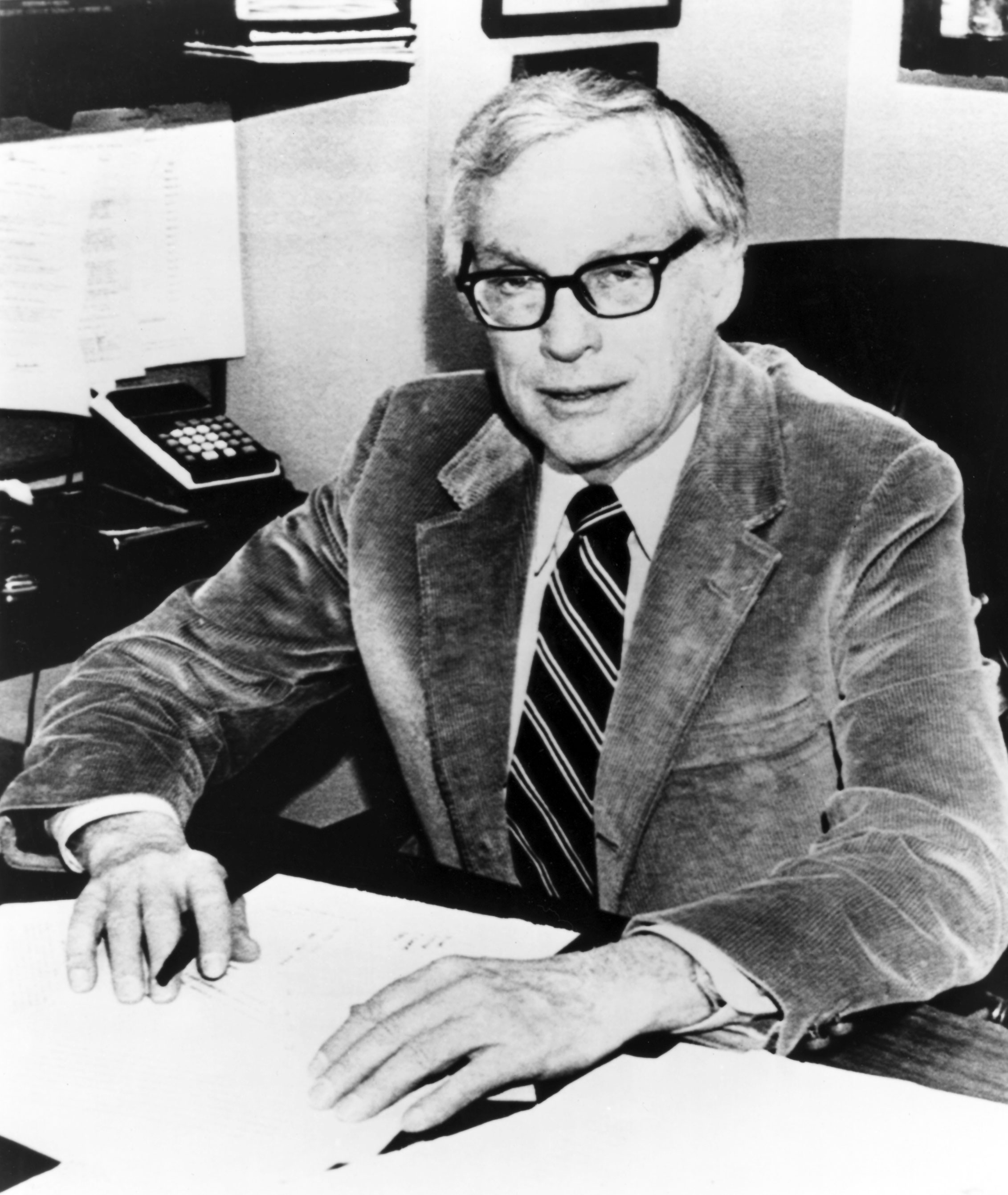
- Born: Elwood Vernon Jensen; January 13, 1920; Fargo, North Dakota, U.S.
- Died: December 16, 2012 (aged 92); Cincinnati, Ohio, U.S.
- Known for: cancer research
- Awards: Brinker International Award (2004); Albert Lasker Award for Basic Medical Research (2004)
- Scientific career
- Workplaces: University of Chicago; University of Cincinnati

Elwood Vernon Jensen (January 13, 1920 – December 16, 2012) was a Distinguished University Professor, George and Elizabeth Wile Chair in Cancer Research at the University of Cincinnati College of Medicine's Vontz Center for Molecular Studies. In 2004 he received the Albert Lasker Award for Basic Medical Research for his research on estrogen receptors. He is considered the father of the field of hormone action.

== Life ==
Jensen was born in Fargo, North Dakota, in the United States, received his bachelor's degree from Wittenberg University in 1940 and PhD in organic chemistry from the University of Chicago in 1944. From 1947 Jensen studied steroid hormones at Chicago, where he isolated estrogen receptors and discovered their importance in breast cancer.

Jensen worked closely with Nobel laureate Charles Huggins; he joined the research team at the Ben May Laboratory for Cancer (now the Ben May Department of Cancer Research) in 1951 and became director after Huggins retired. Jensen first described the estrogen receptor in 1958 and subsequently discovered the superfamily of nuclear hormone receptors along with a unifying mechanism that regulates embryonic development and diverse metabolic pathways.

At the University of Chicago, Professor Jensen was the Charles B. Huggins Distinguished Service Professor Emeritus in the Ben May Department for Cancer Research and the Department of Biochemistry and Molecular Biology at the University of Chicago.

He began work at the University of Cincinnati in 2002, and continued there until 2011.

He died aged 92 of pneumonia at Cincinnati in 2012.

== Awards ==
- 1963, Honorary DSc, Wittenberg College
- 1974, member of the National Academy of Sciences
- 1980, Golden Plate Award, American Academy of Achievement
- 2002, Brinker International Award
- 2004, Albert Lasker Award for Basic Medical Research
- 2005, Honorary MD, University of Athens
