= Michael N. Hall =

American-Swiss molecular biologist

Michael Nip Hall
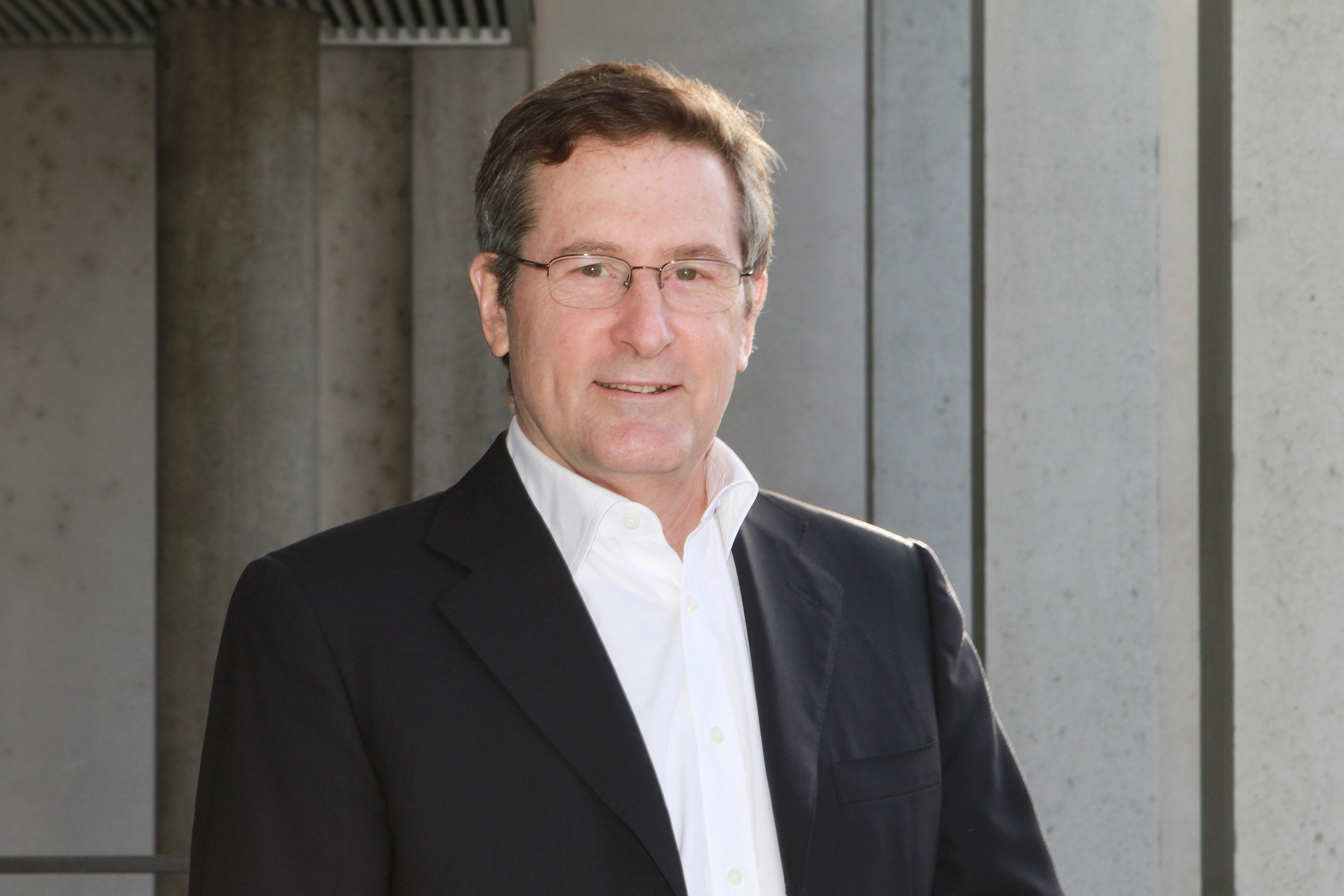
- Michael N. Hall in 2014
- Born: June 12, 1953 (age 73); Puerto Rico
- Education: University of North Carolina at Chapel Hill (BS); Harvard University (PhD)
- Known for: Discovery and research of TOR
- Awards: Balzan Prize; Sjöberg Prize; Albert Lasker Award for Basic Medical Research; Szent-Györgyi Prize; Canada Gairdner International Award; Breakthrough Prize in Life Sciences; Sir Hans Krebs Medal; Marcel Benoist Prize; Louis-Jeantet Prize for Medicine
- Scientific career
- Fields: Molecular biology
- Workplaces: University of Basel; University of California, San Francisco; Pasteur Institute
- Thesis: Genetic studies on the regulation of the major outer membrane porin proteins of Escherichia coli K-12 (1981)
- Doctoral advisor: Thomas J. Silhavy

Michael Nip Hall (born 12 June 1953) is an American-Swiss molecular biologist and Professor at the Biozentrum of the University of Basel, Switzerland. He is known for his research on the TOR protein.

== Early life and education ==
Hall was born in Puerto Rico. His family moved to Peru when he was 3, and relocated to Venezuela shortly after. He moved to the United States at age 13 and attended St. Mark's School in Southborough, Massachusetts.

Hall entered the University of North Carolina at Chapel Hill as an arts major before switching to zoology to pursue medicine. He earned his BSc in 1976. Following clinical experience at a local hospital, he shifted to academic research, completing his undergraduate honors thesis in a molecular genetics laboratory. Hall obtained his PhD from Harvard University in 1981.

== Career ==
Hall worked at the Pasteur Institute in Paris as a research fellow for 8 months in 1981, studying the bacterial genetics research of François Jacob and Jacques Monod. He then joined Ira Herskowitz's group at the University of California, San Francisco as a Helen Hay Whitney Fellow. He became a principal investigator in 1984.

Moving to Basel, Switzerland, in 1987, Hall joined the Division of Biochemistry of the Biozentrum, University of Basel, as an Assistant Professor. He received a promotion to Professor in 1992. He accepted a position as Distinguished Principal Investigator at the Institute of Human Biology of Hoffmann-La Roche, Basel, in 2023.

Hall served as Vice Director of the Biozentrum from 2002 to 2009 and again from 2013 to 2016. He chaired the European Molecular Biology Organization Council from 2021 to 2022, having previously served on the Council from 2017 to 2019 and 2020 to 2022. He serves on the board of trustees of the Louis-Jeantet Foundation.

== Research ==
Hall researches the PI3K/AKT/mTOR pathway and cell growth control. He identified the protein kinase Tor (also known as mTOR). In 1991, Hall identified two genes in yeast that, when mutated, stopped rapamycin from inhibiting cell growth. He named the genes TOR1 and TOR2 for "Target of Rapamycin". His group sequenced these genes, characterizing them as homologous kinases.

Stuart Schreiber identified the mammalian counterpart of TOR 3 years later and named it "mammalian target of rapamycin" (mTOR). The protein was later renamed "mechanistic target of rapamycin", retaining the mTOR abbreviation; both mTOR and TOR are now used to describe the protein across all organisms.

The TOR (or mTOR) gene encodes a protein kinase activated by growth factors like insulin, available nutrients, and cellular energy in the form of ATP, functioning to control cell growth and metabolism. TOR protein dysregulation is implicated in aging and pathologies including cancer, obesity, diabetes, and cardiovascular disease.

Hall studies TOR/mTOR regulation in yeasts and humans. His laboratory discovered that TOR proteins form two functionally and compositionally distinct protein complexes (TORC1 and TORC2). They demonstrated the mammalian counterpart of TORC2 (mTORC2) resists rapamycin inhibition and regulates a signaling pathway distinct from mTORC1.

Hall's research group identified distinct functions for TORC1 and TORC2. mTORC1 activates nucleotide synthesis and is stimulated by glutamine breakdown; mTORC2 promotes lipid synthesis and tumorigenesis. Hall collaborated with Nenad Ban and Timm Maier to report the structures of mTORC1 in 2016 and mTORC2 in 2018.

== Awards and honors ==
- 1995 - Member of the European Molecular Biology Organization
- 2003 – Cloëtta Prize
- 2009 – Fellow of the American Association for the Advancement of Science
- 2009 – Louis-Jeantet Prize for Medicine
- 2012 – Marcel Benoist Prize
- 2013 – Member of the Swiss Academy of Medical Sciences
- 2014 – Sir Hans Krebs Medal
- 2014 – Breakthrough Prize in Life Sciences
- 2014 – Member of the National Academy of Sciences
- 2015 – Canada Gairdner International Award
- 2016 – Debrecen Award for Molecular Medicine
- 2017 – Szent-Györgyi Prize
- 2017 – Albert Lasker Award for Basic Medical Research
- 2019 – HFSP Nakasone Award
- 2019 – BBVA Foundation Frontiers of Knowledge Award
- 2020 – Sjöberg Prize
- 2023 – Grande Médaille, French Academy of Sciences.
- 2024 – Balzan Prize for Biological Mechanisms of Ageing.
