= List of fellows of the Royal Society elected in 1999 =

Fellows of the Royal Society elected in 1999.

== Fellows ==
1. Frances Mary Ashcroft, geneticist
2. Anthony Gerard Martin Barrett, chemist
3. Rosa Susan Penelope Beddington (1956–2001), biologist
4. Derek Ernest Gilmor Briggs, Irish palaeontologist and taphonomist
5. Simon Fraser Campbell, chemist
6. Ian Stuart Edward Carmichael (1930–2011), igneous petrologist and volcanologist
7. Lorna Casselton, biologist
8. John Brian Clegg, molecular biologist
9. David John Hugh Cockayne (1942–2010), materials scientist
10. David Thomas Delpy, bioengineer
11. Derek Ashworth Denton, Australian biochemist
12. Raymond Alan Dixon, microbiologist
13. Athene Donald, physicist
14. Philip Christopher England, geophysicist
15. Douglas Thomas Fearon, medical immunologist
16. Gary William Gibbons, theoretical physicist
17. William Timothy Gowers, mathematician
18. Ronald Ernest Grigg, chemist
19. Alan Hall (1952–2015), cell biologist
20. Sir Peter Leonard Knight, physicist
21. John Paul Maier, chemist
22. Barry James Marshall, Australian physician
23. Iain William Mattaj, molecular biologist
24. Ernest A McCulloch (1926–2011), cell biologist
25. John Graham McWhirter, mathematician
26. John Dixon Mollon, neuroscientist
27. John Richard Ockendon, applied mathematician
28. John Bernard Pethica, material scientist
29. Dolph Schluter, Canadian evolutionary biologist
30. John Graham Shepherd, earth scientist
31. Joseph Ivor Silk, astrophysicist
32. William James Stirling, particle physicist
33. Alfred Geoffrey Sykes (1934–2007), inorganic chemist
34. Janet M Thornton, biochemist
35. John Francis Toland, mathematical scientist
36. Anthony James Trewavas, molecular biologist
37. Alan Walker, paleoanthropologist
38. Graham Barry Warren, biochemist
39. Dennis Lawrence Weaire, Irish physicist
40. Sir Peter Michael Williams, physicist
41. Robert Williamson, Australian molecular geneticist
42. Sir Magdi Habib Yacoub, cardiothoracic surgeon

== Foreign members ==
1. Robert Huber, German biochemist
2. Marc W Kirschner, American cell biologist
3. George Ledyard Stebbins (1906–2000), American geneticist
4. Gilbert Stork, American organic chemist
5. Edward Witten, American theoretical physicist
6. Richard Neil Zare, American physical chemist
