= Alan Hall =

British cell biologist

Alan Hall, Chairman of the Cell Biology Program in the Sloan Kettering Institute

Alan Hall FRS (19 May 1952 – 3 May 2015) was a British cell biologist and a biology professor at the Sloan-Kettering Institute, where he was chair of the Cell Biology program. Hall was elected a Fellow of the Royal Society in 1999.

== Early life and education ==
Hall was born in Barnsley in Yorkshire. He earned his BA in chemistry from Oxford University. He began his studies for a PhD at Oxford, but after two months he followed his major professor Jeremy R. Knowles to Harvard University, where he earned a PhD in biochemistry in 1977. He then took postdoctoral fellowships in molecular biology at the University of Edinburgh and the University of Zurich.

== Career and research ==
Hall's PhD with Knowles was on the enzymology of β-lactamase, which led to his first paper being published in Nature in 1976. He used strains of E. coli with mutated β-lactamase, an antibiotic resistance enzyme, and assayed their activity in the presence of benzylpenicillin and cephalosporin C. Direct selection on these mutants allowed catalytic properties of β-lactamase to be identified and allowed structure-function relationships of the enzyme to be researched further. As a PhD student, Hall also published a paper on triosephosphate isomerase (TIM), which is a key enzyme in glycolysis. Specifically, he characterized the uncatalyzed interconversion of the two TIM substrates: dihydroxyacetone phosphate and glyceraldehyde 3-phosphate. But as was later noted by John P. Richard, Hall's analysis was compromised because he did not take into account the overriding β-elimination of inorganic phosphate from the enediol intermediate in the uncatalyzed reaction (unlike in the TIM-catalyzed reaction), forming methylglyoxal.

In 1981, Hall went to work at Institute for Cancer Research in London, where he stayed for 12 years. His work, in collaboration with his colleague and close friend Christopher Marshall, made seminal contributions to our understanding of cell signalling in animal cells, in particular the role of Rho and Ras small GTPases in regulating a variety of cellular functions such as proliferation, morphology and migration. In 1982, Hall helped identify transforming sequences in human sarcoma cell lines at the Institute for Cancer Research in London. DNA from a rhabdomyosarcoma cell line and a fibrosarcoma cell line transformed an NIH/3T3 mouse fibroblast cell line. After injection into mice, tumors started to form in as little as 10 days. Next, the transforming activities of the rhabdomyosarcoma and fibrosarcoma cell lines were measured after being digested with an array of endonucleases. Further DNA testing showed that the transforming sequences in the two cancer cell lines were the same, and the gene was later characterised as N-ras, a member of the Ras gene family.

In 1986, Hall helped uncover properties of the human p21 protein, which is encoded by N-ras. GTPase activity of different mutant forms of p21, one cloned from a patient with myeloblastic leukaemia and one derived from in vitro mutagenesis, was measured. Results showed no correlation between the wild-type or mutant N-ras p21's GTPase activity and transforming potential. These findings were published in Molecular and Cellular Biology (MCB).

Alan Hall showed the specificity of Rho in the stimulation of focal adhesions and stress fibre formation in fibroblasts in the presence of extracellular factors in 1992. He first realised that the addition of bovine fetal calf serum (FCS) to Swiss 3T3 cells increased the polymerisation of actin and assembly of stress fibres. The immunofluorescence following the increase of vinculin and talin, two cytoskeletal proteins, at the intracellular face of the plasma membrane with Val14rhoA microinjection showed the association of focal adhesions with the end of the new stress fibres. After size fractionation of FCS and analysis of the lipids that bound to serum albumin, the lysophosphatidic acid (LPA) was found to be responsible for the serum activity that induced stress fibre formation. The inhibition of Rho by C3 transferase ribosylation resulted in an inhibition of focal adhesion and stress fibre assembly, but had no effect on membrane ruffling. These findings were published in Cell and cited over 4000 times. In parallel with this experiment, Hall showed that the presence of Rac, another Ras-related GTP-binding protein, is implicated in the regulation of the actin organisation in presence of extracellular growth factors. Immunofluorescence and antibody techniques were used to localise the mutant V12rac1 protein after being microinjected into the cytoplasm of confluent serum-starved Swiss 3T3 cells. The comparison with the normal cells showed that Rac1 stimulates actin filament production at the membrane, pinocytosis, and membrane ruffling. The inhibition of endogenous Rac function by mutants N17rac and V12rac1 prevented growth factor-induced membrane ruffling. In addition, the inactivation of Rho protein by ADP-ribosylation in Rac1 microinjection reduced the formation of actin stress fibres. Hall concluded that Rac and Rho are complementary for polymerised actin organisation. Indeed, Rho-dependent response is stimulated by the action of growth factors on Rac protein.

In 1993 he moved to University College London, where he helped to create a MRC Cell Biology Unit, within the Laboratory for Molecular Cell Biology (LMCB). In 2000, he became director of the MRC Laboratory for Molecular Cell Biology.

In 2002, Alan Hall discerned the role of G_{aq} in Rho signalling pathways. Prior to this publication, there were conflicting reports as to the role of G_{aq} in cell signalling via Rho; some said that it was not able to induce Rho activation, and some said that it could. Using immunoblotting techniques, Hall showed that activation of endogenous G_{aq} via G protein-coupled receptors (GCPRs) could in fact induce activation of Rho, and had similar results when directly expressing activated G_{aq}. It was already known that other G_{a} proteins could induce Rho activation (i.e. G_{a}13 activates p115 Rho GEF, which in turn activates Rho), but it was also known that G_{aq} does not activate p115 Rho GEF, and therefore must act via an alternate, unknown mechanism. Two years later, he moved to Memorial Sloan Kettering Cancer Center as chair of the cell biology program.

In 2005, there was an abundance of activators and targets of the Rho pathway that had been identified, yet very little investigation into the way in which specificity of the pathway is maintained. It was known at this point that several identified Rho targets were structurally similar to scaffold proteins, which have been shown in the past to mediate interaction specificity in other pathways. Hall used immunoprecipitation assays to show that CNK1, a scaffold protein-like target of Rho, interacts with two Rho-specific GEFs (Net1 and p115RhoGEF) and two kinases of the JNK MAP kinase pathway (MLK2 and MKK7). He then determined that CNK1 acts together with these four targets to activate the JNK MAP kinase pathway, but not other Rho-activated pathways. This led to the conclusion that CNK1 couples specific Rho exchange factors to the JNK MAP kinase pathway, providing specificity. In the same year, Hall investigated the role of the small GTPase Ral in neurite branching. After microinjection of cortical and sympathetic neurons with active and dominant-negative Ral, the staining of the cells with antibodies showed that the increases in neurite branching was directly linked to the presence of active Ral. Further evidence of the importance of Ral was provided when cortical neurons were depleted of endogenous RalA and RalB isoforms by RNA interference (RNAi) and showed a decrease in the branching. By plating SCG on plastic dishes in the presence of different substrates, Hall realised that Ral was activated by laminin to induce this branching. In fact, Ral-dependent branching implicated the phosphorylation of growth-associated protein GAP-43. Finally, Ral mutants unable to bind to their specific effector proteins showed that RalA and RalB isoforms promote branching through exocyst complex and phospholipase D respectively.

In 2010, Hall analysed a number of Rho signalling pathways, which regulate the formation of apical junctions in human bronchial epithelial (HBE) cells. Downregulation of RhoA in the HBE cell lines using siRNAs showed a lack of apical junction formation in contrast with the controls. The siRNAs that targeted RhoA had no effect on other members of the Rho family. Further analysis showed that PRK2, a direct target of Rho, is required for the formation of apical junctions. Mutational variants of PRK2 were used to discover that although initial formation of pre-apical junctions isn't blocked, the maturation process into true apical junctions is prevented.

Hall's research has had wide implications across human health and disease, particularly cancer. In addition, a generation of cell biologists was educated and trained under his supervision across two continents.

== Honours and awards ==
In 1993, Hall was awarded the Feldberg Foundation Prize for his work on the role GTP-binding proteins played on signal transduction pathways. He was elected a Fellow of the Academy of Medical Sciences in 2005. His work in 2005 on the regulation of adhesion, migration and polarity of the cell cytoskeleton was awarded the Louis-Jeantet Prize for Medicine. Later that year he won the Novartis Medal for his work with Rho GTPases role in cell behaviour. The Canada Gairdner International Award (2006) was awarded to him for the discovery of Rho GTPases that play a role in cytoskeleton arrangement and cell migration and its application to cancerous cells.

== Bibliography ==
- Sloan-Kettering page
- another article on Hall
- a tribute to Hall
