= Ribbeck =

Ribbeck is a German surname. Notable people with the surname include:

- Erich Ribbeck (born 1937), German football player and manager
- Otto Ribbeck (1827–1898), German classical scholar
- Katharina Ribbeck, German-American biologist

== See also ==
- Herr von Ribbeck auf Ribbeck im Havelland, German poem
- Ribbeck (Meteorite)
