= Luigi Naldini =

Italian physician (born 1959)

Luigi Naldini (born 1959 in Turin) is an Italian gene therapist, professor of cell and tissue biology and of gene and cell therapy at Vita-Salute San Raffaele University, and the director of San Raffaele Telethon Institute for Gene Therapy in Milan, Italy. Often considered as "the father of the lentivirus gene therapy", he is globally known as the pioneer of "the development and applications of lentiviral vectors for gene transfer" that allowed the gene therapy treatment of several genetic diseases. He is also a scientific co-founder of three biotech start-up companies, Genenta in Milan and New York, Chroma Medicine in Milan and Boston, Genespire in Milan. He is also the former president of European Society of Gene and Cell Therapy (ESGCT) and an elected member of European Molecular Biology Organization (EMBO). In 2019, he was awarded Louis-Jeantet Prize for Medicine "for taking gene therapy from the bench to the bedside".

== Education and career ==
He graduated in 1983 with an M.D. from the University of Turin and in 1987 with a Ph.D. in cell and tissue biology from the Sapienza University of Rome. His doctoral advisor was Paolo M. Comoglio. As a postdoc from 1987 to 1989, Naldini was supervised by Joseph Schlessinger in Rockville, Maryland. From 1990 to 1996 Naldini was an assistant professor in the University of Turin's department of biomedical sciences and oncology. From 1994 to 1996 he was a visiting scientist at the Salk Institute in La Jolla, California. From 1996 to 1998 Naldini worked in biotechnology in Foster City, California as a visiting scientist and director at Cell Genesys (which was taken over by BioSante Pharmaceuticals in 2009). From 1998 to 2002 he was an associate professor at the University of Turin's Medical School. At the Vita-Salute San Raffaele University's School of Medicine, he is since 2003 a full professor of cell and tissue biology. At Milan's San Raffaele Telethon Institute for Gene Therapy (SR-Tiget), he was from 2003 to 2008 the co-director and is since 2008 the director. Over the last 25 years, he has made significant contribution to the field of gene therapy, from its development to its huge application in the clinic. His research also advanced the "use of artificial nucleases for targeted genome editing in cell and gene therapy." He also serves the Committee on Human Genome Editing of three national academies of United States, National Academy of Sciences, National Academy of Engineering, and National Academy of Medicine.

== Awards and accolades ==
- 2019: Grand Officer of the Order for Merit of the Italian Republic ("Grande Ufficiale" dell'Ordine "Al Merito della Repubblica Italiana"), from the President and the Prime Minister of the Republic of Italy, on December 27
- 2019: The Global Health Pioneer Award, Dubai, United Arab Emirates
- 2019: Louis-Jeantet Prize for Medicine, Lausanne, Switzerland
- 2017: Ernest Beutler Lecture and Prize, American Society of Hematology(ASH), United States
- 2016: The Captains of the Year Award ("Premio Capitani"), Sala del Grechetto of Palazzo Sormani, Milan, Italy
- 2015: Outstanding Achievement Award, European Society of Gene and Cell Therapy (ESGCT)
- 2015: The Jimenez Diaz Prize, La Fundación Conchita Rábago, Madrid, Spain
- 2015: Honorary doctorate, Vrije Universiteit Brussel, Belgium
- 2014: Gili Agostinelli Award ("Premio Gili Agostinelli"), Accademia delle Scienze di Torino, Turin, Italy
- 2014: Outstanding Achievement Award, American Society of Gene and Cell Therapy, United States
- 2009: Advanced Investigator Grant, European Research Council (ERC)
- 2008: Elected Member, European Molecular Biology Organization (EMBO)
