= Iain Mattaj =

British scientist

Iain Mattaj FRS FRSE
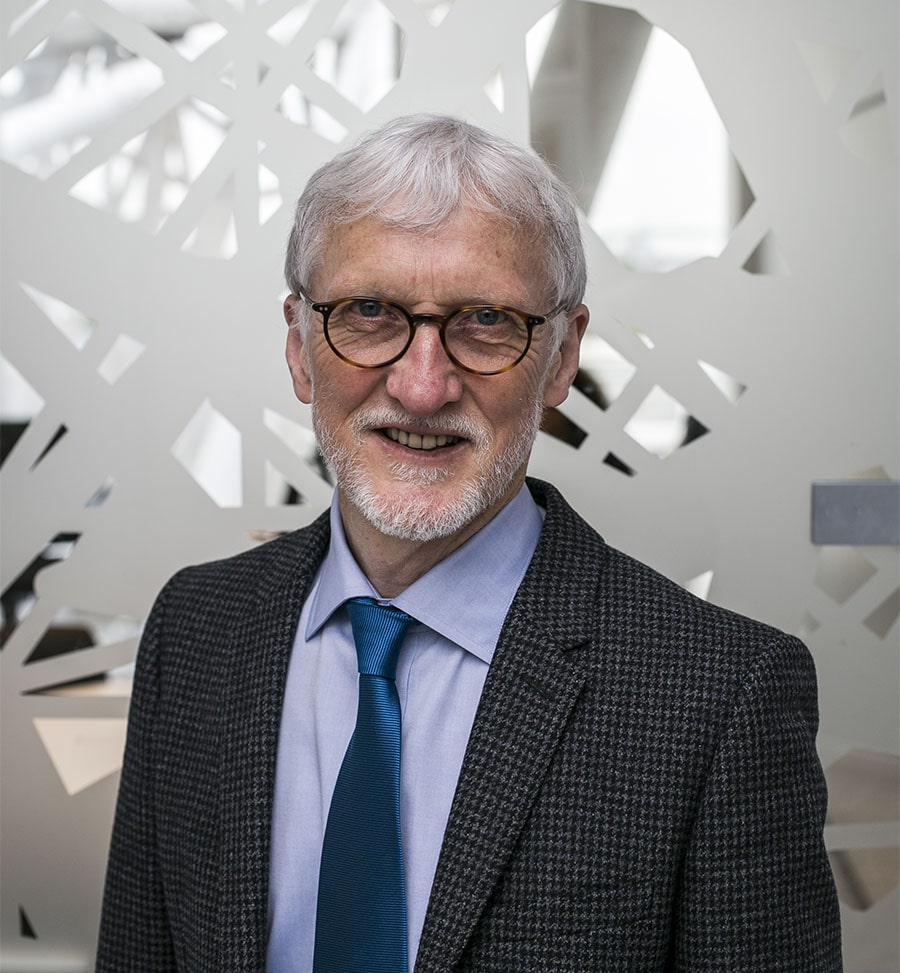
- Mattaj in 2019
- Born: 5 October 1952 (age 73); St Andrews, Scotland
- Education: University of Edinburgh; University of Leeds
- Awards: Louis-Jeantet Prize for Medicine (2001), Verdienstkreuz (2021)
- Scientific career
- Fields: Biochemistry, Molecular Cell Biology
- Workplaces: Human Technopole, European Molecular Biology Laboratory
- Thesis: Studies on cloned GDH genes (1980)
- Doctoral advisor: John Wooton
- Notable students: Elisa Izaurralde, postdoctoral researcher (1990-1996), Martin Hetzer, postdoctoral researcher (1998-2003), Katharina Ribbeck (2003-2006), Tobias Walther (1998-2002)
- Website: humantechnopole.it/en/people/iain-mattaj/

Iain William Mattaj (born 5 October 1952 in St Andrews, Scotland, UK) FRS FRSE is a British scientist and Honorary Professor at Heidelberg University in Germany. From 2005 to 2018 he was Director General of the European Molecular Biology Laboratory (EMBL). He stepped down from the position at the end of 2018 following his appointment to Human Technopole. In January 2019 he took office as the first Director of Human Technopole, the new Italian institute for life sciences in Milan, Italy.

== Education ==
Prof. Mattaj has a degree in biochemistry from the University of Edinburgh (BSc) and he obtained a PhD from the University of Leeds in 1980 for research on cloned Glutamate dehydrogenase (GDH) genes supervised by John Wooton.

He carried out his postdoctoral research at the Friedrich Miescher Institute (CH) and then at the Biocentre, University of Basel. There he worked in the laboratory of Eddy De Robertis and established the research areas he would continue to pursue. In 1985 he moved to EMBL where he took up the position of Group Leader at the Heidelberg Laboratory. In the following years he became Coordinator of the Gene Expression Unit (1990) and then Scientific Director of EMBL (1999) until his appointment as Director General of EMBL (2005).

== Research ==
Mattaj has made a number of important contributions to our knowledge concerning how RNA and proteins are transported between the cell nucleus and cytoplasm. These findings stemmed from his early work on the import and export of ribonucleoproteins — RNA–protein complexes — to and from the cell nucleus.

Prof. Mattaj subsequently uncovered the role of enzymes known as GTPases in the regulation of mitosis — the division of the cell nucleus into two daughter nuclei. Under the influence of Ran, a GTPase signaling protein, the cell cytoskeleton remodels to form the mitotic spindle — a crucial structure in mitosis. Ran also has an important role in nuclear envelope assembly at the end of mitosis. By dissecting Ran's role in facilitating mitosis, Iain is enabling researchers to create improved cell-regeneration therapies.

== Awards and honours ==
Mattaj was elected a Fellow of the Royal Society (FRS) in 1999, a Fellow of Academia Europaea in 1999, a Fellow of the Royal Society of Edinburgh in 2000, a Fellow of the American Academy of Arts and Sciences in 2001, a Fellow of the Deutsche Akademie der Naturforscher Leopoldina in 2005, a Fellow of the Academy of Medical Sciences FMedSci in 2016 and a Foreign Associate of the National Academy of Sciences (USA) in 2017. In 2001 he was awarded the Louis-Jeantet Prize for Medicine. Over the years he has received Honorary Doctorates from the University of Edinburgh, the University of Dundee, Umea University and the University of Leeds. He was Editor of EMBO Journal from 1991-2004 and since 2017 he is Chair of the Board of Trustees of the Darwin Trust. In September 2021, during a ceremony at EMBL Heidelberg, Prof Mattaj received the Verdienstkreuz for his commitment to science. In the same month he was also elected as a member of the Royal Swedish Academy of Sciences to the class for Biosciences.
