= Barry Marshall =

Australian physician (born 1951)

Barry Marshall AC FRACP FRS FAA
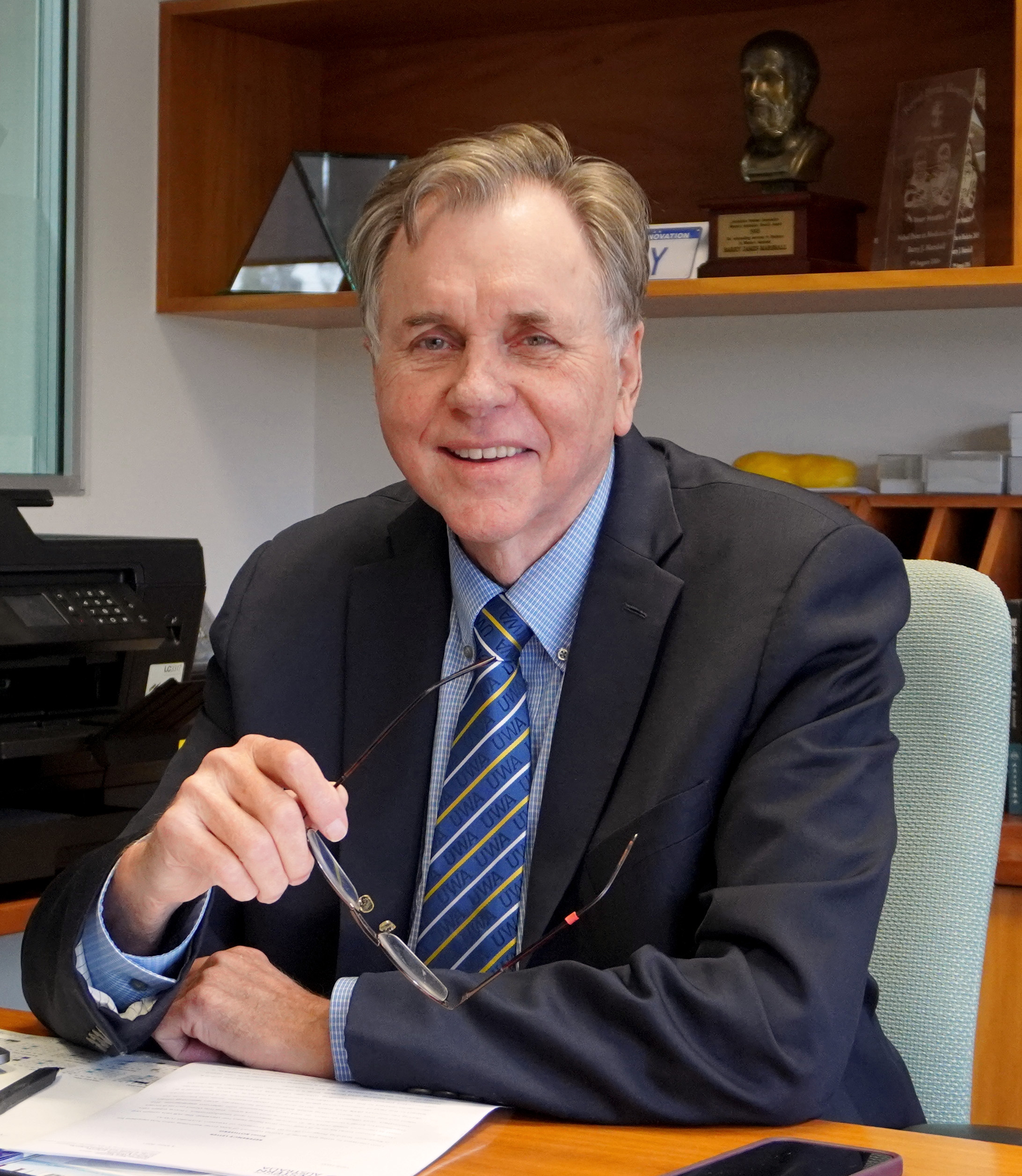
- Marshall in 2021
- Born: Barry James Marshall; 30 September 1951 (age 75); Kalgoorlie, Western Australia
- Education: University of Western Australia (MBBS)
- Known for: Helicobacter pylori
- Spouse: Adrienne Joyce Feldman (m. 1972)
- Children: 4
- Awards: Lasker Award (1995); Paul Ehrlich and Ludwig Darmstaedter Prize (1997); Buchanan Medal (1998); Prince Mahidol Award (2001); Keio Medical Science Prize (2002); Nobel Prize in Physiology (2005); Western Australian of the Year Awards (2006); Companion of the Order of Australia (2007)
- Scientific career
- Fields: Medicine; Microbiology
- Workplaces: University of Western Australia; University of Virginia; Zhengzhou University; Shenzhen University
- Website: www.uwa.edu.au/marshall-centre

Barry James Marshall (born 30 September 1951) is an Australian physician, Nobel Laureate in Physiology or Medicine, Professor of Clinical Microbiology and Co-Director of the Marshall Centre at the University of Western Australia. Marshall and Robin Warren showed that the bacterium Helicobacter pylori (H. pylori) plays a major role in causing many peptic ulcers, challenging decades of medical doctrine holding that ulcers were caused primarily by stress, spicy foods, and too much acid. This discovery has allowed for a breakthrough in understanding a causative link between Helicobacter pylori infection and stomach cancer.

He is a prominent example, in the tradition of John Scott Haldane, JBS Haldane and, much later, Jonas Salk, of testing a medical hypothesis by self-administration.

== Early life and education ==
Marshall was born in Kalgoorlie, Western Australia and lived in Kalgoorlie and Carnarvon until moving to Perth at the age of eight. His father held various jobs, and his mother was a nurse. He is the eldest of four siblings. He attended Marist College, Churchlands for his secondary education and the University of Western Australia School of Medicine, where he received a Bachelor of Medicine, Bachelor of Surgery (MBBS) in 1974. He married his wife Adrienne in 1972 and has four children, a son and three daughters.

== Career and research ==
In 1979, Marshall was appointed Registrar in Medicine at the Royal Perth Hospital. He met Dr. Robin Warren, a pathologist interested in gastritis, during internal medicine fellowship training at Royal Perth Hospital in 1981. Together, they both studied the presence of spiral bacteria in association with gastritis. In 1982, they performed the initial culture of H. pylori and developed their hypothesis on the bacterial cause of peptic ulcers and gastric cancer. It has been claimed that the H. pylori theory was ridiculed by established scientists and doctors, who did not believe that any bacteria could live in the acidic environment of the stomach. Marshall was quoted as saying in 1998 that "everyone was against me, but I knew I was right." On the other hand, it has also been argued that medical researchers showed a proper degree of scientific scepticism until the H. pylori hypothesis could be supported by evidence.

In 1982, Marshall and Warren obtained funding for one year of research. The first 30 out of 100 samples showed no support for their hypothesis. However, it was discovered that the lab technicians had been throwing out the cultures after two days. This was standard practice for throat swabs where other organisms in the mouth rendered cultures unusable after two days. Due to other hospital work, the lab technicians did not have time to immediately throw out the 31st test on the second day, and so it stayed from Thursday through to the following Monday. In that sample, they discovered the presence of H. pylori. They later found out that H. pylori grows more slowly than the conventional two days required by other mucosal bacteria, and that stomach cultures were not contaminated by other organisms.

In 1983, they submitted their findings thus far to the Gastroenterological Society of Australia, but the reviewers turned their paper down, rating it in the bottom 10% of those they received that year.

After failed attempts to infect piglets in 1984, Marshall had a baseline endoscopy done before drinking a broth containing cultured H. pylori, with the expectation of developing an ulcer as many as years later. He was surprised when, in just three days, he began to develop vague nausea and halitosis, due to the achlorhydria—there was not enough acid to kill bacteria in the stomach and their waste products manifested as bad breath, noticed by his wife. On days 5–8, he developed achlorhydric vomiting. On day eight, he had another endoscopy, which showed massive inflammation (gastritis), and a biopsy from which H. pylori was cultured, showing it had colonised his stomach. On the fourteenth day after ingestion, a third endoscopy was done, and Marshall began to take antibiotics. Marshall did not develop antibodies to H. pylori, suggesting that innate immunity can sometimes eradicate acute H. pylori infection. Marshall's illness and recovery, based on a culture of organisms extracted from a patient, fulfilled Koch's postulates for H. pylori and gastritis, but not for peptic ulcers. This experiment was published in 1985 in the Medical Journal of Australia and is among the most cited articles from the journal.

After his work at Fremantle Hospital, Marshall did research at Royal Perth Hospital (1985–86) and at the University of Virginia, USA (1986–present), before returning to Australia while remaining on the faculty of the University of Virginia. He held a Burnet Fellowship at the University of Western Australia (UWA) from 1998 to 2003. Marshall continues research related to H. pylori and runs the H. pylori Research Laboratory at UWA.

In 2007, Marshall was appointed Co-Director of The Marshall Centre for Infectious Diseases Research and Training, founded in his honour. In addition to Helicobacter pylori research, the Centre conducted varied research into infectious disease identification and surveillance, diagnostics and drug design, and transformative discovery. His research group expanded to embrace new technologies, including Next-Generation Sequencing and genomic analysis. Marshall also accepted a part-time appointment at the Pennsylvania State University that same year. He established the Noisy Guts Project in 2017 – a research team dedicated to investigating new diagnostics and treatments for irritable bowel syndrome. This resulted in a spin-out company, Noisy Guts Pty Ltd, which develops functional food products. In August 2020, Marshall, along with Simon J. Thorpe, accepted a position at the scientific advisory board of Brainchip INC, a computer chip company.

== Awards and honours ==
In 2005, the Karolinska Institute in Stockholm awarded the Nobel Prize in Physiology or Medicine to Marshall and Robin Warren, his long-time collaborator, "for their discovery of the bacterium Helicobacter pylori and its role in gastritis and peptic ulcer disease".

Marshall also received the Warren Alpert Prize in 1994; the Australian Medical Association Award and the Albert Lasker Award for Clinical Medical Research in 1995; the Gairdner Foundation International Award in 1996; the Paul Ehrlich and Ludwig Darmstaedter Prize in 1997; the Golden Plate Award of the American Academy of Achievement, the Dr A.H. Heineken Prize for Medicine, the Florey Medal, and the Buchanan Medal of the Royal Society in 1998.

He was elected a Fellow of the Royal Society (FRS) in 1999. His certificate of election to the Royal Society reads:

Barry Marshall, together with Robin Warren, discovered spiral bacteria in the stomachs of almost all patients with active chronic gastritis, or duodenal or gastric ulcers, and proposed that the bacteria were an important factor in the aetiology of these diseases. In 1985, Marshall showed by self-administration that this bacterium, now called Helicobacter pylori, causes acute gastritis and suggested that chronic colonisation directly leads to peptic ulceration. These results were a major challenge to the prevailing view that gastric disorders had a physiological basis, rather than being infectious diseases. Marshall showed that antibiotic and bismuth salt regimens that killed H. pylori resulted in the cure of duodenal ulcers. The view that gastric disorders are infectious diseases is now firmly established and there is increasing evidence for a role of H. pylori infection in gastric cancers. The work of Marshall has produced one of the most radical and important changes in medical perception in the last 50 years. Barry Marshall was awarded the Albert Lasker Award for Clinical Science in 1995 and the Buchanan Medal in 1998.

Marshall was awarded the Benjamin Franklin Medal for Life Sciences in 1999; the Keio Medical Science Prize in 2002; and the Australian Centenary Medal and Macfarlane Burnet Medal and Lecture in 2003.

Marshall was appointed a Companion of the Order of Australia in 2007.

Marshall was elected Fellow of the Australian Academy of Health and Medical Sciences (FAHMS) in 2015.

Marshall was awarded the honour of Western Australian of the Year in 2006. He was also awarded the Australian of the Year for Western Australia, alongside Warren, in 2007.

Marshall was awarded the University of Oxford honorary Doctor of Science degree in 2009.

In 2015, Marshall's Alma mater, UWA, renamed the science library building into Barry J Marshall Library.

Marshall is the Ambassador for Life Sciences for Western Australia.

== See also ==
- Timeline of peptic ulcer disease and Helicobacter pylori
