= Elisa Izaurralde =

Uruguayan biochemist and molecular biologist

- Born: 20 September 1959; Montevideo, Uruguay
- Died: 30 April 2018 (aged 58); Tübingen, Germany
- Education: University of Geneva, Switzerland, Biochemistry (1979–1985); University of Geneva, Switzerland, Molecular Biology, PhD, (1985–1989)
- Known for: RNA transport, RNA metabolism, RNA silencing
- Awards: Gottfried Wilhelm Leibniz Prize, 2008
- Scientific career
- Fields: Biochemistry, molecular biology
- Workplaces: Max Planck Institute for Developmental Biology, Tübingen, Germany; EMBL, Heidelberg, Germany
- Doctoral advisor: Ulrich Laemmli

Elisa Izaurralde (20 September 1959 in Montevideo, Uruguay – 30 April 2018 in Tübingen, Germany) was an Uruguayan biochemist and molecular biologist. She served as Director and Scientific Member of the Department of Biochemistry at the Max Planck Institute for Developmental Biology in Tübingen from 2005 until her death in 2018. In 2008, she was awarded the Gottfried Wilhelm Leibniz Prize, shared with Elena Conti, for "fundamental new insights into intracellular RNA transport and RNA metabolism". Together with Conti, she helped characterize proteins important for exporting mRNA out of the nucleus and later in her career she helped elucidate mechanisms of mRNA silencing, translational repression, and mRNA decay.

== Early life and education ==
Elisa Izaurralde was born in Montevideo, Uruguay on 20 September 1959. At the age of 17 she left Uruguay to pursue an education at Geneva University in Switzerland. After undergraduate training in biochemistry, she went on to receive a PhD in molecular biology in 1989, for work on chromatin organization she performed under the guidance of Ulrich Laemmli.

== Career ==
After receiving her PhD, Izaurralde stayed on in Laemmli's lab for an additional year as a postdoctoral researcher before starting a second postdoctoral position at the European Molecular Biology Laboratory (EMBL) in Heidelberg in 1990, working with Iain Mattaj. It was here that she switched her focus from DNA to RNA and met biophysicist Elena Conti, with whom she would share the 2008 Leibniz Prize.

In 1996, she returned to Geneva University, where she led her first work group as a junior research group leader in the Department of Molecular Biology. In this position, she researched the mRNA export factor TAP-p15, before returning to EMBL in 1999, where she extended this line of research together with Elena Conti.

Izaurralde worked as a group leader and later a senior scientist at EMBL before becoming Director of the Biochemistry Department at the Max Planck Institute for Developmental Biology in Tübingen in 2005.

She co-organized numerous meetings and conferences including multiple meetings on translational control and non-coding RNA at Cold Spring Harbor Laboratory, EMBO/EMBL Symposia on "The non-coding genome," and the 2010 RNA society meeting. She also served as an editor for a number of scientific journals including the FEBS Journal and PLOS Biology. She was elected to the Board of Directors of the RNA Society in 2004. Beginning in 2020, the RNA Society began awarding the "Elisa Izaurralde Award for Innovation in Research, Teaching, and Service″ with the first awardee being Lori Passmore.

== Research ==
In order to make a protein, genetic information in DNA is copied (transcribed) into messenger RNA (mRNA) in the nucleus and then exported into the cytoplasm, where it is translated into a protein. Much of Izaurralde's early career focused on elucidating how this export occurs at a molecular level.

Later in her career, Izaurralde shifted her focus to a different aspect of RNA biology: RNA metabolism – particularly how mRNA molecules are selectively silenced. Her research in this area included studying mRNA silencing, in which microRNA (miRNA) molecules with sequences complementary to sites in the mRNA direct silencing machinery to the mRNA, as well as more general mRNA decay and transcriptional repression mechanisms, and how these processes are interconnected. She discovered a family of scaffolding proteins called GW182 that is important for helping the effector molecule carrying the miRNA (a member of the Argonaute family of proteins) recruit additional silencing co-factors including deadenylase complexes.

== Awards and honors ==
- Friedrich Miescher Award, Swiss Society for Biochemistry, 1999
- European Life Scientist Organization (ELSO) Young Scientist Award, 2000
- Elected member of the European Molecular Biology Organization (EMBO), 2000
- Gottfried Wilhelm Leibniz Prize, German Research Foundation, 2008
- Elected member of the German Academy of Sciences Leopoldina, 2009
- Ernst Jung Prize for Medicine, Jung Foundation for Science and Research, 2012

== Selected publications ==
- Behm-Ansmant, Isabelle; Rehwinkel, Jan; Doerks, Tobias; Stark, Alexander; Bork, Peer; Izaurralde, Elisa (15 July 2006). "mRNA degradation by miRNAs and GW182 requires both CCR4:NOT deadenylase and DCP1:DCP2 decapping complexes". Genes & Development. 20 (14): 1885–1898. doi:10.1101/gad.1424106. ISSN 0890-9369. PMC 1522082. PMID 16815998.
- Hir, Hervé Le; Gatfield, David; Izaurralde, Elisa; Moore, Melissa J. (3 September 2001). "The exon–exon junction complex provides a binding platform for factors involved in mRNA export and nonsense-mediated mRNA decay". The EMBO Journal. 20 (17): 4987–4997. doi:10.1093/emboj/20.17.4987. ISSN 0261-4189. PMC 125616. PMID 11532962.
- Eulalio, Ana; Huntzinger, Eric; Izaurralde, Elisa (16 March 2008). "GW182 interaction with Argonaute is essential for miRNA-mediated translational repression and mRNA decay". Nature Structural & Molecular Biology. 15 (4): 346–353. doi:10.1038/nsmb.1405. ISSN 1545-9993. PMID 18345015. S2CID 12608927.
- Grüter, Patric; Tabernero, Carlos; von Kobbe, Cayetano; Schmitt, Christel; Saavedra, Claudio; Bachi, Angela; Wilm, Matthias; Felber, Barbara K; Izaurralde, Elisa (April 1998). "TAP, the Human Homolog of Mex67p, Mediates CTE-Dependent RNA Export from the Nucleus". Molecular Cell. 1 (5): 649–659. doi:10.1016/s1097-2765(00)80065-9. ISSN 1097-2765. PMID 9660949.
