= Louis-Jeantet Prize for Medicine =

Swiss medicine award

Louis‑Jeantet Prizes
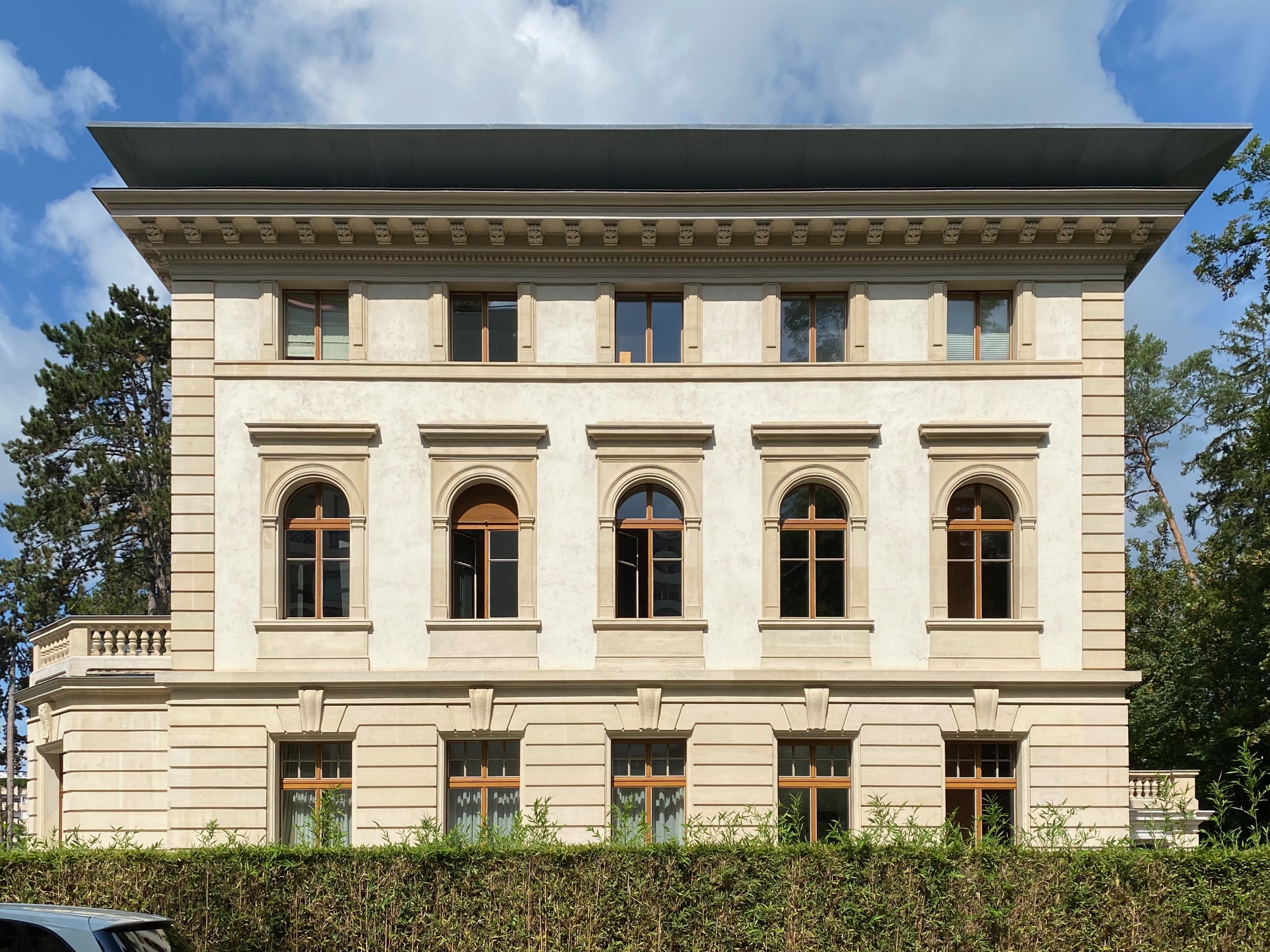
- The Louis‑Jeantet Foundation, Geneva, Switzerland
- Awarded for: Distinguished and innovative biomedical research
- Location: Geneva, Switzerland 46°11′33″N 6°09′54″E
- Country: Switzerland
- Presented by: Fondation Louis-Jeantet
- Rewards: 1.4 million CHF total; 500,000 CHF per laureate
- First award: 1986
- Website: www.jeantet.ch/en/prizes-louis-jeantet/prizes-presentation/

Established in 1986, the Louis-Jeantet Prizes are funded by the Fondation Louis-Jeantet and awarded each year to experienced researchers who have distinguished themselves in the field of biomedical research in one of the member states of the Council of Europe. They are not intended solely as the recognition of work that has been completed, but also to encourage the continuation of innovative research projects. The prizes are awarded to fully active researchers whose scientific efforts are focused on biomedical research. When the research being recognised is close to practical applications for combating illnesses affecting humankind, one of the Louis-Jeantet Prizes converts into a Jeantet-Collen Prize for Translational Medicine, supported by generous donations from the Désiré Collen Stichting.

The particular research domains in which prizes have been awarded are physiology, biophysics, structural biology, biochemistry, cellular and molecular biology, developmental biology and genetics; prize-winners have worked in immunology, virology, bacteriology, neurobiology, clinical epidemiology and structural biochemistry.

The Prize is endowed with 1.4 million Swiss francs. The sum available to each prize-winner amounts to 500'000 francs, of which 450'000 francs are to be used for financing ongoing research and 50'000 francs are given to the researcher personally.

== Prize winners ==
List of winners:

- 1986: Luc Montagnier, Michael Berridge, Désiré Collen
- 1987: Sydney Brenner, Walter Gehring, Dominique Stehelin
- 1988: Rolf Zinkernagel, John Skehel, Bert Sakmann
- 1989: Roberto Poljak, Walter Schaffner, Greg Winter
- 1990: Nicole Le Douarin, Harald von Boehmer, Gottfried Schatz
- 1991: Pierre Chambon, Frank Grosveld, Hugh Pelham
- 1992: Paul Nurse, Christiane Nüsslein-Volhard, Alain Townsend
- 1993: Jean-Pierre Changeux, Richard Henderson, Kurt Wüthrich
- 1994: Thierry Boon, Jan Holmgren, Philippe Sansonetti
- 1995: Dirk Bootsma and Jan Hoeijmakers, Peter Goodfellow and Robin Lovell-Badge, Peter Gruss
- 1996: Björn Dahlbäck, Ulrich K. Laemmli, Nigel Unwin
- 1997: Philip Cohen, Kim Nasmyth, Richard Peto
- 1998: Denis Duboule, Walter Keller, Ronald Laskey
- 1999: Adrian P. Bird, Herbert Jäckle, Jean-Louis Mandel
- 2000: Konrad Basler, Thomas J. Jentsch, Ueli Schibler
- 2001: Alain Fischer, Iain W. Mattaj, Alfred Wittinghofer
- 2002: Timothy J. Richmond, Richard Treisman, Karl Tryggvason
- 2003: Wolfgang Baumeister, Riitta Hari, Nikos K. Logothetis
- 2004: Hans Clevers, Alec J. Jeffreys
- 2005: Alan Hall, Svante Pääbo
- 2006: Kari Alitalo, Christine Petit
- 2007: Venkatraman Ramakrishnan, Stephen C. West
- 2008: Pascale Cossart, Jürg Tschopp
- 2009: Michael N. Hall, Peter J Ratcliffe
- 2010: Michel Haïssaguerre, Austin Smith
- 2011: Stefan Jentsch, Edvard Moser, May-Britt Moser
- 2012: Matthias Mann, Fiona Powrie
- 2013: Michael Stratton, Peter Hegemann, Georg Nagel
- 2014: Elena Conti, Denis Le Bihan
- 2015: Emmanuelle Charpentier, Rudolf Zechner
- 2016: Andrea Ballabio, John F. X. Diffley
- 2017: Silvia Arber, Caetano Reis e Sousa
- 2018: Christer Betsholtz, Antonio Lanzavecchia
- 2019: Luigi Naldini, Botond Roska
- 2020: Erin Schuman, Michele De Luca, Graziella Pellegrini
- 2021: Patrick Cramer, Jérôme Galon, Ton Schumacher
- 2022: Carol V. Robinson, Uğur Şahin, Özlem Türeci, Katalin Karikó
- 2023: Dario Alessi, Ivan Đikić, Brenda Schulman
- 2024: Dirk Görlich, Charles Swanton
- 2025: Veit Hornung, Gilles Laurent
- 2026: Fiona Doetsch, Yasmine Belkaid

== See also ==
- Latsis Foundation
- List of medicine awards
- Louis-Jeantet Foundation
- Marcel Benoist Prize
- Prizes named after people
