= Frank Grosveld =

Dutch molecular biologist

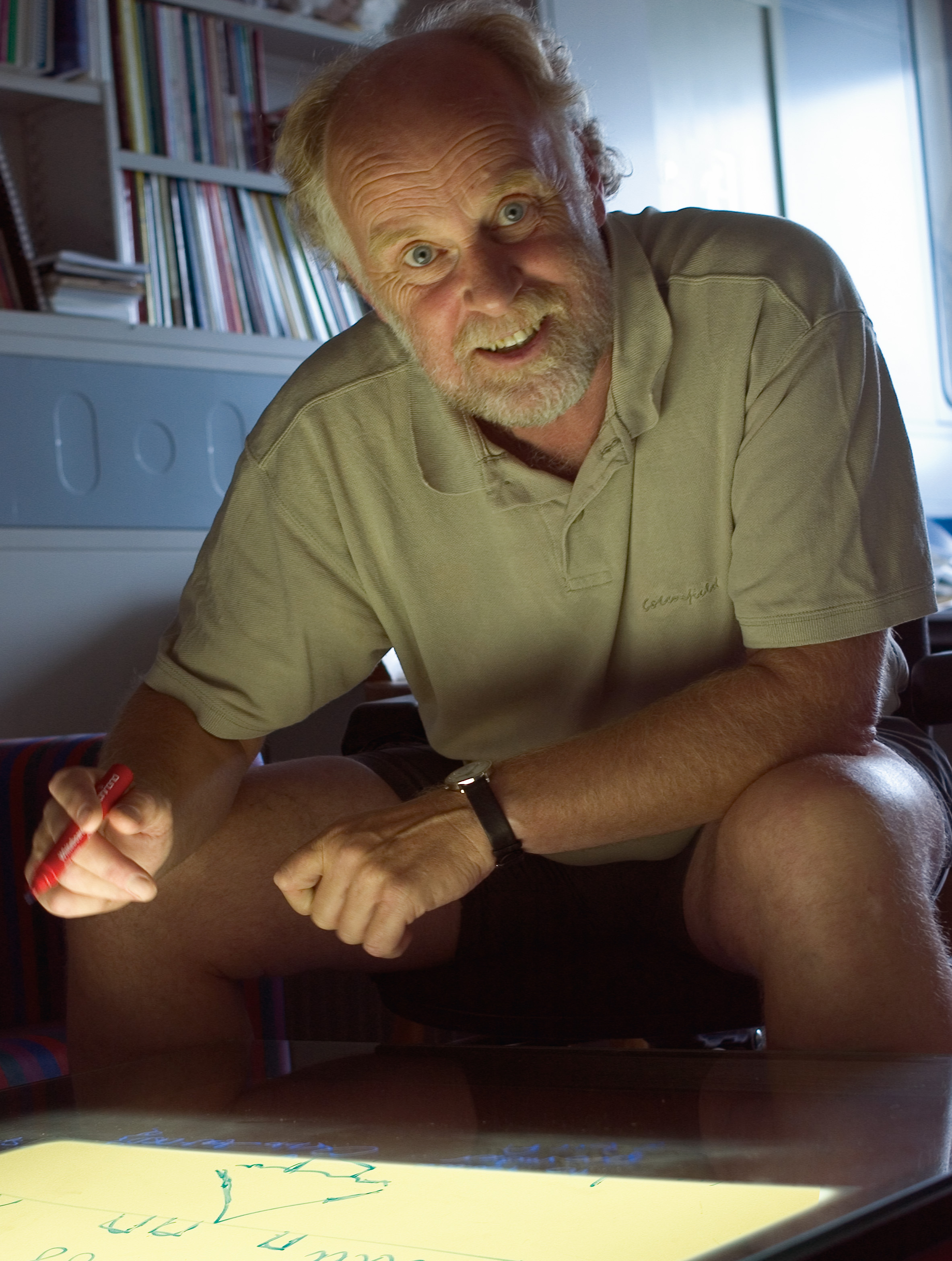
- Born: 18 August 1948 (age 78)
- Education: University of Amsterdam; McGill University
- Awards: Louis-Jeantet Prize for Medicine (1991); Spinoza Prize (1995)
- Scientific career
- Fields: Molecular biology
- Workplaces: Erasmus University Rotterdam

Franklin Gerardus "Frank" Grosveld, FRS (born 18 August 1948, died 25 June 2026) was a Dutch molecular biologist whose research interests are in the regulation of transcription during development with a particular emphasis on mammalian erythroid differentiation. He is a professor and former Head of the Department of Cell Biology at the Erasmus MC, Rotterdam.

== Biography ==
He obtained his PhD degree from McGill University, Montreal and after completing two postdoctoral periods with Charles Weissmann (Zurich) and Richard Flavell (Amsterdam and London) he started his own research group at the National Institute for Medical Research, Mill Hill.

Grosveld has been conducting research on the regulation of gene expression over thirty years. In his post-doctoral research he constructed the first reliable method for cloning human DNA cosmids - at the time an extremely difficult but rewarding accomplishment that has since been adopted by many other laboratories. By using the globin gene cluster he made the ground-breaking discovery of a locus control region located upstream of the gene itself and governing overall control of globin gene expression. After this first report, locus control regions have now been identified for many genes and have permitted for example the ectopic expression of genes in transgenic mice. In further studies he identified chromatin loops and the hubs that hold the loops together. His more recent excursions into erythroid differentiation have made the key identification of the transcription factor GATA1, a major and unique advance into understanding erythroid cell development. Along with major research advances he has also developed new technologies, such as 4C technology (a modification of the 3C technology invented previously by others) that makes possible examination of chromatin conformation on a chip and constructed a number of spin off companies. He has mentored a large number of PhDs and postdocs, many of whom have gone on to academic positions all over the world and are now eminent scientists leading groups of their own.

Grosveld's research on the control of globin gene expression has been selected as one of the top ten achievements of Medical Research Council (UK) (MRC) in the 20th century by Higher Education and Research Opportunities in the UK. He was awarded the Louis-Jeantet Prize for Medicine (1991) and the Spinozapremie (Spinoza Prize) (1995). He was selected as academy professor of Royal Netherlands Academy of Arts and Sciences in 2008.

He was a Fellow of the Royal Society (FRS) and Member of the Royal Netherlands Academy of Arts and Sciences since 1994.
