= Elena Conti =

Italian biochemist

- Born: 14 February 1967 (age 59); Varese, Italy
- Education: Imperial College, London (PhD 1996); University of Pavia (Chemistry, 1991)
- Known for: RNA transport, RNA metabolism
- Awards: Gottfried Wilhelm Leibniz Prize (2008); Sir Hans Krebs Medal (2011); Louis-Jeantet Prize for Medicine (2014)
- Scientific career
- Fields: structural biology, biophysics, molecular biology, crystallography, chemistry
- Workplaces: Max Planck Institute of Biochemistry; Rockefeller University; EMBL; Heidelberg

Elena Conti (born 14 February 1967 in Varese, Italy) is an Italian biochemist and molecular biologist. She serves as Director and Scientific Member of the Max Planck Institute of Biochemistry in Martinsried, Germany, where she uses structural biology and biophysical techniques to study RNA transport and RNA metabolism. Together with Elisa Izaurralde, she helped characterize proteins important for exporting mRNA out of the nucleus.

== Early life and education ==
After graduating in chemistry at the University of Pavia in 1991, Conti achieved a PhD on protein crystallography at the Imperial College in London in 1996, with a thesis on the crystal structure of firefly luciferase". From 1997 to 1999 she worked as a postdoctoral fellow at the Rockefeller University in New York City; her postdoc advisor was John Kuriyan.

== Career ==
She worked as a group leader at the European Molecular Biology Laboratory in Heidelberg, Germany from 1999 until January 2006, when she became director and scientific member at the Max Planck Institute of Biochemistry in Martinsried, Germany as a part of Structural Cell Biology department. Her research focuses on the regulation of gene expression in eukaryotic cells, particularly trying to discover the mechanism behind RNA recognition, metabolism and degradation, which is coupled to the translation machinery.

She is also an honorary professor at LMU Munich in Germany since 2007.

== Awards and honors ==
In 2008, Conti was awarded the Gottfried Wilhelm Leibniz Prize, the most prestigious prize awarded to the researchers in Germany. The prize was shared with Elisa Izaurralde and awarded for "fundamental new insights into intracellular RNA transport and RNA metabolism." In 2014 she received the Louis-Jeantet Prize for Medicine for her important contributions to understanding the mechanisms governing RNA quality, transport and degradation. In 2018, she received the Bijvoet Medal of the Bijvoet Center for Biomolecular Research of Utrecht University. She is an elected member of European Molecular Biology Organization and of the Academy of Sciences Leopoldina.
