= Jan Hoeijmakers =

Dutch biologist, biochemist and geneticist

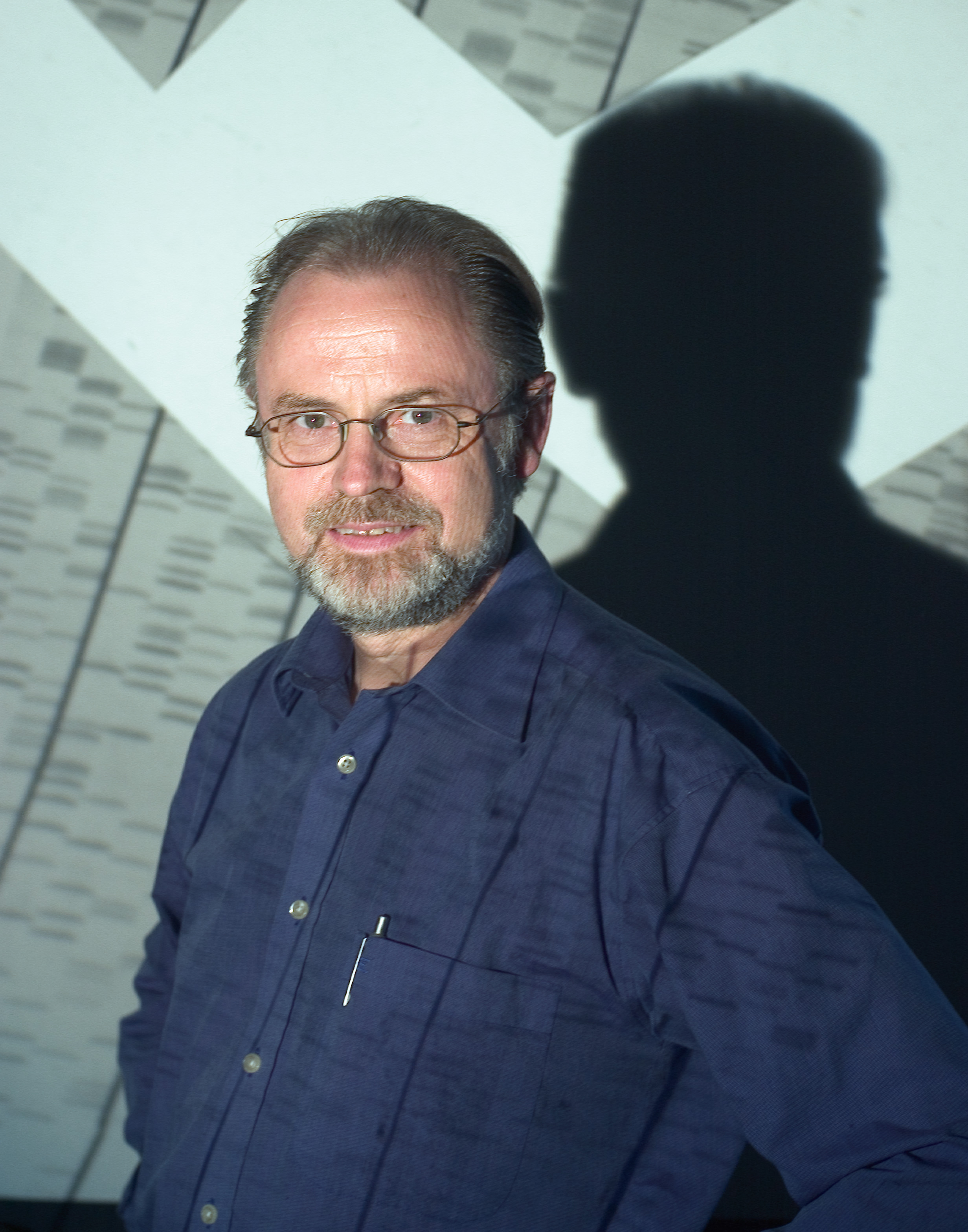
- Hoeijmakers in 1998
- Born: Jan Hendrik Jozef Hoeijmakers; 15 March in 1951; Sevenum
- Occupations: Molecular biologist, biochemist, and molecular geneticist

Jan Hendrik Jozef Hoeijmakers (born 15 March in 1951 in Sevenum) is a Dutch molecular biologist, biochemist, and molecular geneticist.

== Education and career ==
Hoeijmakers studied biology from 1969 at the Radboud University Nijmegen with receiving his MSc degree in molecular biology in 1975 (with a focus on biochemistry and genetics). At the University of Amsterdam he performed his doctoral research from 1975 to 1979 and then was a lecturer at the department of microbiology from 1979 to 1981. He obtained a PhD in molecular medicine in 1981 from the University of Amsterdam under Piet Borst with dissertation Trypanosomes: Kinetoplast DNA and Antigenic Variation. At Erasmus University Rotterdam, as a member of Dirk Bootsma's group in the Institute of Genetics, Hoeijmakers was, in the department of cell biology and genetics, a senior scientist from 1981 to 1985, an associate professor from 1985 to 1993, and a professor of molecular genetics from 1993 to the present. The Royal Netherlands Academy of Arts and Sciences sponsored him as an Academy Professor from 2011 to 2016. He is the author or co-author of over 490 scientific publications. He has served on the editorial boards of five scientific journals.

In 1983 he received the Harold-Quintus-Bosz Prize for his dissertation, in which he clarified the molecular mechanism of the antigen variation of trypanosomes. He uncovered the structure and main function of the network mitochondrial DNA of the parasite. He also clarified the complex genetic mechanism by which trypanosomes constantly change their surface antigens in order to escape the immune system.

In Rotterdam in the early 1980s he achieved the first cloning of human genes responsible for DNA repair and discovered a strong evolutionary stability of the DNA repair system. He clarified the mechanism of nucleotide excision repair (NER) and associated hereditary diseases (xeroderma pigmentosum, Cockayne syndrome, trichothiodystrophy). He found with Jean-Marc Egly that Transcription Factor II H (TF_{II}H) opens the DNA for the start of the NER.

Hoeijmakers was elected in 2000 a member of the Royal Netherlands Academy of Arts and Sciences (section ‘Medicine’, dept. ‘Physics’). In 2013 he was appointed a Knight in the Order of the Netherlands Lion for important research in cancer and aging.

He received in 1986 the Snoo van t’Hoogerhuys Prize (for the isolation of the first human gene for DNA repair) and in 1995 the Louis-Jeantet Prize for Medicine (jointly with Dirk Bootsma for their research on DNA repair). In 1995 Hoeijmakers was elected a member of the European Molecular Biology Organization (EMBO). He received in 1998 the Spinoza Prize, the highest Dutch science award. He received in 2000 both the Van Gogh award from the Nederlandse Organisatie voor Wetenschappelijk Onderzoek (NWO) (i.e. Dutch Organization for Science) and the Descartes-Huygens award for French-Dutch scientific collaborations and in 2001 the Josephine Nefkens Prize for Cancer Research. In 2008 the European Research Council awarded him an Advanced Grant. In 2011 he received the Queen Wilhelmina Research Award from the Dutch Society for Cancer Research and, with Bert Vogelstein, the Charles Rodolphe Brupbacher Prize for Cancer Research for research on genome stability and its role in aging and cancer. In 2017 Hoeijmakers received the International Prize of the Olav Thon Foundation.
