= Roberto Poljak =

Argentine biophysicist and immunologist (1932–2019)

Roberto Juan Poljak (17 September 1932, Buenos Aires; – 30 May 2019, Baltimore County) was an Argentine biophysicist and immunologist.

== Biography ==
Poljak graduated in 1949 with a bachelor's degree from the Colegio Nacional de Quilmes and in 1954 with a master's degree from the Facultad de Ciencias Naturales of the University of Buenos Aires. In 1956 he received his doctoral degree from the National University of La Plata and married Mabel Amelia Iglesias (1929–2020). As a postdoc, he was from 1958 to 1960 at Massachusetts Institute of Technology (MIT) and from 1960 to 1962 at the Royal Institution's Davy-Faraday Research Laboratory. Poljak was a biophysics professor from 1962 to 1981 (and from 1972 a full professor) at the Johns Hopkins School of Medicine. He was from 1981 to 1992 a professor at the Pasteur Institute, where he led a group doing research on molecular structures in immunology. From 1992 until his retirement as professor emeritus, Poljak was a full professor at the University of Maryland and the director of Center for Advanced Research in Biotechnology (CARB) in Rockville, Maryland. (CARB was established in 1984 as a joint venture of the University of Maryland's Biotechnology Institute and the National Institute of Standards and Technology.)

In the early 1970s at Johns Hopkins University, Poljak as the team leader with 3 other researchers "determined the first 3-D structure of an antibody". In 1986 at the Pasteur Institute, he with 3 colleagues determined the 3-dimensional structure of an antigen-antibody complex, thus elucidating "how antibodies link with antigens".

Poljak was in 1986 was made an honorary professor of the University of Buenos Aires. He received in 1989 in Geneva, Switzerland the Louis-Jeantet Prize for Medicine and in 1991 in Madrid, Spain the Premio Lección Conmemorativa Jiménez Díaz.

Upon his death he was survived by his widow, a son, a daughter, three grandchildren, and one great-grandchild.
