= Katharina Ribbeck =

German-American biochemist and biophysicist

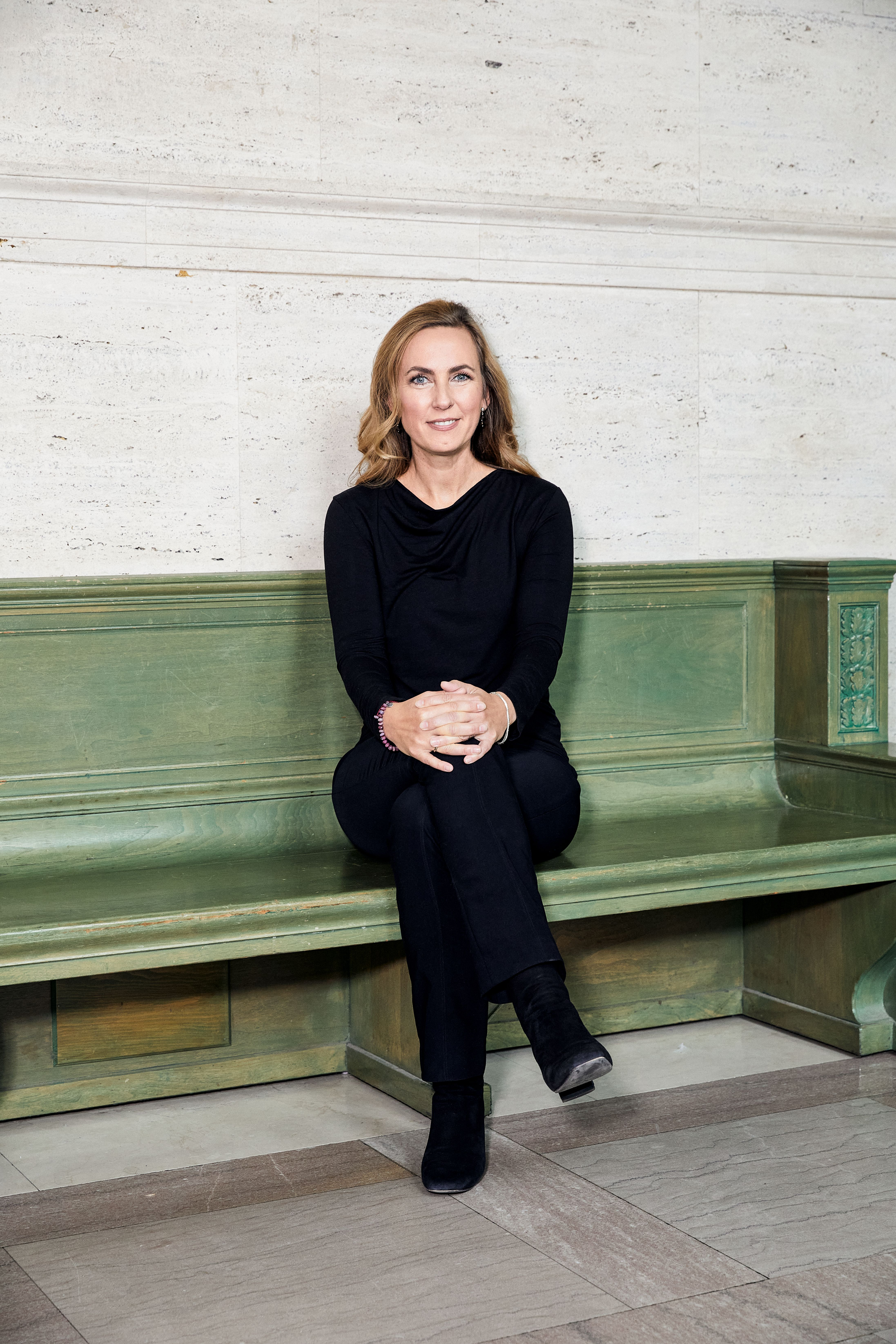
- Born: Darmstadt, Germany
- Education: University of Heidelberg, Germany
- Known for: Studies on the role of mucus in human health, mucus' influence on the behavior of harmful pathogens, and the development of synthetic mucin materials to promote mucus barrier function
- Scientific career
- Fields: Biological engineering
- Workplaces: Massachusetts Institute of Technology; Harvard University
- Thesis: Mechanistic analysis of transport through the nuclear pore complex (2001)
- Academic advisors: Dirk Görlich, Tim Mitchison, Iain Mattaj, Andrew W. Murray, Jan Ellenberg

Videos and articles
- TED-Ed: How mucus keeps us healthy
- New York Times: Mucus: It's snot what you think
- GEO: Misunderstood hero: How mucus keeps us healthy and protects us from pathogens
- Science Friday: It's snot what you think
- STAT News: Why mucus is the ‘unsung hero’ of the human body
- WIRED: How the sugars in spit tame the body’s unruly fungi
- MIT Technology Review: The science of slime
- MIT Spectrum: A slippery viral defense

Katharina Ribbeck is a German-American biologist. She is the Andrew (1956) and Erna Viterbi Professor of Biological Engineering at the Massachusetts Institute of Technology. Known as one of the first researchers to study how mucus impacts microbial behavior, Ribbeck investigates both the function of mucus as a barrier to pathogens such as fungi, bacteria, and viruses and how mucus can be leveraged for therapeutic purposes without promoting antimicrobial resistance. She has also studied changes that cervical mucus undergoes before birth, informing potential diagnostic tools for assessing the risk of preterm birth. Building on this work, Ribbeck co-founded Tulip Biosciences, a platform company focused on the development of mucus-inspired biomaterials to support healthy functioning of the mucus barrier.

== Education ==
Ribbeck received her B.S. in biology from the University of Heidelberg in 1998. During her senior year, she attended the University of California, San Diego, to study neurobiology for her diploma thesis. She earned her Ph.D. in biology, also from the University of Heidelberg, in 2001.

== Career ==
Upon completing her Ph.D., Ribbeck continued her research as a postdoctoral scientist at the European Molecular Biology Laboratory in Heidelberg, Germany, and then Harvard Medical School. After her postdoctoral research, she moved to Harvard University as an independent Bauer Fellow in 2007, where she began to investigate how particles and bacteria move through mucus barriers.

In 2010, Ribbeck moved to the Department of Biological Engineering at the Massachusetts Institute of Technology as an assistant professor. She attained tenure as a full professor in 2017.

In 2025, Ribbeck co-founded Tulip Biosciences, a biotechnology research company that develops and produces mucin-mimetic biomaterials to restore the natural mucus barrier, focusing on vaginal health and antibiotic resistance.

=== Research on nuclear pore complexes ===
During her Ph.D. work, Ribbeck investigated the selective transport of molecules through the nuclear pore complex, which is partly mediated by a hydrogel barrier. With her Ph.D. advisor, Dirk Görlich, Ribbeck developed a selective phase model for molecular transport through the nuclear pore barrier. Görlich and Ribbeck also showed that molecular transport through nuclear pore complexes may be facilitated by hydrophobic interactions.

=== Research on mitotic spindles ===
As a postdoctoral researcher at the European Molecular Biology Laboratory, Ribbeck studied proteins involved in the organization of the mitotic spindle, a dynamic bundle consisting of proteins and molecules that aids in chromosome segregation during cell division. Her research contributed to the discovery of a novel protein (NuSAP) that plays a crucial role in mitotic spindle organization.

=== Research on functions of mucus ===
In 2007, Ribbeck's research returned to hydrogels, with a specific focus on mucus, i.e., a large natural hydrogel that is closely related to the polymer network she and Görlich had proposed to exist within nuclear pore complexes. Her work has elucidated the role of mucins, a primary component of mucus, in human health. Ribbeck is known for her pioneering work in this field, which has shown that mucus plays an active role in protecting against harmful pathogens, including fungi, bacteria, and viruses. Specifically, her research has shown that mucins and their associated sugar chains (glycans) can "tame" pathogens by inhibiting virulence traits such as biofilm formation, cell adhesion, and toxin secretion, without inducing antimicrobial resistance.

She has shown that mucins prevent bacteria such as Pseudomonas aeruginosa and Streptococcus mutans, the bacteria that cause tooth decay, from forming biofilms, which make them difficult to eradicate. Ribbeck demonstrated that mucin glycans can reduce the virulence of pathogens such as Pseudomonas aeruginosa, a bacterium that can cause illness in individuals with cystic fibrosis or compromised immune systems, and Streptococcus pneumoniae, a pathogen that causes pneumonia and meningitis, by inhibiting the cell-cell communication, toxin secretion, and biofilm formation ability of these bacteria.

Ribbeck's work has also demonstrated the role of mucus in protecting against fungal infections. Her studies have shown that mucins and specific mucin glycans induce a morphological change, accompanied by a reduction in biofilm formation and cell adhesion, in Candida albicans, a fungal pathogen that causes a variety of diseases in humans. Her work has also shown that mucins found in multiple types of mucus, including human spit, can prevent fungal pathogens from causing disease in healthy humans.

Ribbeck identified a correlation between the properties of mucus in the cervix in pregnant women and the likelihood of preterm birth and has developed probes to test mucus permeability as a step towards diagnosing the risk for premature birth.

Ribbeck has extensively investigated the biophysical properties of mucus and other hydrogels and the mechanisms by which some particles and molecules, including viruses such as SARS-CoV-2, selectively pass through the barrier. Ribbeck has also studied hydrogels produced by pathogens and has found that the extracellular matrix formed by the pathogenic bacterium Pseudomonas aeruginosa protects the bacterium against antibiotics.

=== Research on synthetic mucus ===
Ribbeck has investigated approaches for engineering synthetic mucins and mucus-inspired biomaterials, with the aim of potentially influencing the population of bacteria in the human body. For example, her lab has generated silk-based mucin-mimetic polymers that can prevent the virulent biofilm formation of Streptococcus mutans and Streptococcus sanguinis and mucus-inspired self-healing hydrogels that can protect underlying cells against viral infection. Additionally, to mimic the glycans within mucus, Ribbeck has developed carbohydrate polymers that assemble into nanomaterials displaying a dense network of carbohydrate ligands; Ribbeck’s lab demonstrated that this mucin-mimetic material can influence the morphology of Candida albicans, similar to the effect of mucus.

In collaboration with others, Ribbeck demonstrated that synthetic mucins can block toxins produced by Vibrio cholerae, the bacteria that causes cholera. She has also shown that purified foreign mucins can prevent viruses from infecting cells and suggested that they could be used to supplement the anti-viral activity of native mucins. More recently, Ribbeck's work has shown that synthetic mucins can function as prebiotics, with the potential to promote probiotic bacteria and healthy gut function.

== Outreach and media ==
Ribbeck has given presentations about her work on mucus at the MIT Museum and the Boston Museum of Science. Regarding the importance of educating others on the role of mucus in human health, she has stated:

"The intention here is to really introduce a field to the generations to come, so they grow up understanding that mucus is not a waste product. It's an integral part of our physiology and a really important piece of our health. If we understand it, it can really give us a lot of information that will help us stay healthy and possibly treat diseases."

In 2015, Ribbeck and her team produced a TED-Ed lesson to provide basic education about mucus and its role in human health. Ribbeck has been interviewed on NPR, STAT news, and Scientific American and has been featured in articles in The New York Times, GEO, WIRED, and MIT News.

== Awards and recognitions ==
- 2003: Ruprecht-Karls Prize (Heidelberg University)
- 2007: Award for Genome-Related Research (Merck)
- 2013: John Kendrew Award (EMBL).
- 2014: Popular Science, "Brilliant 10"
- 2015: NSF CAREER award
- 2015: Junior Bose Award for Excellence in Teaching (MIT)
- 2016: Harold E. Edgerton Faculty Achievement Award (MIT)
- 2018: Professor Amar G. Bose Research Grant (MIT), given for "work that is unorthodox, and potentially world-changing"
- 2024: Elected to the College of Fellows of the American Institute for Medical and Biological Engineering (AIMBE) for "pioneering contributions in mucus biology and advancing biomaterials for therapeutic purposes"
