= Dirk Bootsma =

Dutch geneticist (1936–2020)

- Born: 23 May 1936
- Died: 5 October 2020 (aged 84)
- Education: Utrecht University
- Known for: Discovering cause of chronic myelogenous leukemia
- Awards: Louis-Jeantet Prize for Medicine (1995)
- Scientific career
- Workplaces: Erasmus University Rotterdam
- Thesis: De invloed van röntgenstraling op de delingscyclus van in vitro gekweekte cellen (1965)
- Doctoral advisor: Jacob A. Cohen

Dirk Bootsma (23 May 1936 – 5 October 2020) was a Dutch geneticist. He was a professor at Erasmus University Rotterdam from 1969 and 2002. He and his research group discovered the cause of chronic myelogenous leukemia and furthered the understanding of the nucleotide excision repair.

== Career ==
Bootsma was born on 23 May 1936. He began studying biology at Utrecht University in September 1953. He conducted his first DNA research under Professor Winkler. In 1965, he earned his PhD under Jacob A. Cohen from Leiden University with a thesis titled: "De invloed van röntgenstraling op de delingscyclus van in vitro gekweekte cellen". In the late 1960s, Bootsma performed his compulsory military service at the Medical-Biological Laboratory of the Netherlands Organisation for Applied Scientific Research (TNO) where he researched the influence of X-radiation on chromosomes in living cells.

After completing his PhD, Bootsma joined the newly founded Department of Cell Biology and Genetics at Erasmus University Rotterdam. In 1969, he became a professor of genetics. With the advent of recombinant DNA, Bootsma and his department utilised this innovation. In 1974, he organized the second Human Gene Mapping Conference in Noordwijkerhout. Later, Bootsma shifted his focus from gene mapping to cancer research, building on his earlier experiences at TNO. He invested mechanisms of DNA repair, particularly in rare forms of skin cancer, and discovered several proteins in this field. Bootsma had a special interest in chromosome 22, which was recently implicated in chronic myelogenous leukemia. In 1982, the Bootsma's research team discovered the cause of this specific type of blood cancer: two broken chromosomes (9 and 22) which were attached mistakenly reattached to the other, leading to the Philadelphia chromosome.

Another topic on which Bootsma furthered research from his time at TNO was DNA repair. He set up research into genetic disorders, especially xeroderma pigmentosum (XP). For this research, Bootsma used human cells, being one of the first in the Netherlands to do so. With the developing of technology, especially the possibility to insert foreign DNA into humans and the discovery of recombinant DNA, Bootsma was able to further his study of XP. In 1984, his group was able to clone the repair gene ERCC1. When ERCC3 was also cloned, this led to a solution for DNA repair in XP-patients by inserting them in their fibroblasts, leading to an overall furthered understanding of the nucleotide excision repair.

Bootsma retired in October 2002 and was succeeded as group research leader by Jan Hoeijmakers.

Bootsma died on 5 October 2020, aged 84.

== Honours and distinctions ==
Bootsma was elected a member of the European Molecular Biology Organization in 1976. He was elected a member of the Royal Netherlands Academy of Arts and Sciences in 1983. Bootsma was elected a member of the Academia Europaea in 1991.

Bootsma and Jan Hoeijmakers won the 1995 Louis-Jeantet Prize for Medicine. In 1996, Bootsma held the Rogier Soher Lecture of the International Agency for Research on Cancer. In 2000, he won the Mauro Baschirotto Award of the European Society of Human Genetics. In 2009, Bootsma's discovery of the relation between chronic myelogenous leukemia and the Philadelphia chromosome was incorporated in the Dutch canon of medicine.
