= Human Technopole =

Research institute in Milan, Italy

- Abbreviation: HT
- Founded: 2018
- Type: Public research foundation
- Headquarters: Milan, Italy
- President: Gianmario Verona
- Director: Marino Zerial
- Employees: ~500 (2025)

Human Technopole (HT) is an Italian life sciences research institute based in Milan, Italy. Established in 2018 by the Italian government, the institute is located in the MIND Milano Innovation District on the site of Expo 2015. Human Technopole conducts research in genomics, structural biology, computational biology, and related areas of biomedical science.

The institute was established with the goal of creating a research center intended to promote international collaboration in the life sciences.

== History ==
The Human Technopole Foundation was established under the Italian budget law No. 232 of 11 December 2016. Its founding members include the Ministry of Economy and Finance, the Ministry of Health, and the Ministry of Education, University and Research, which oversee the foundation.

Renovation work on Palazzo Italia began in September 2017. In March 2018, the foundation’s statute was approved by decree of the President of the Council of Ministers.

In May 2018, the first members of the supervisory board were appointed, including the first president, Marco Simoni. In June 2018, the supervisory board appointed the institute’s first director, Iain Mattaj.

In May 2021, the former Cardo of Expo Milano 2015 was named after Rita Levi-Montalcini, Nobel Prize laureate in Physiology or Medicine.

That year the institute reached its first 100 employees and installed cryo-electron microscopy facilities.

Since 2024, Human Technopole has made five national research platforms available to the Italian scientific community, providing access, training, and technological development to provide shared technological infrastructure and services for the Italian research community.

== Campus ==
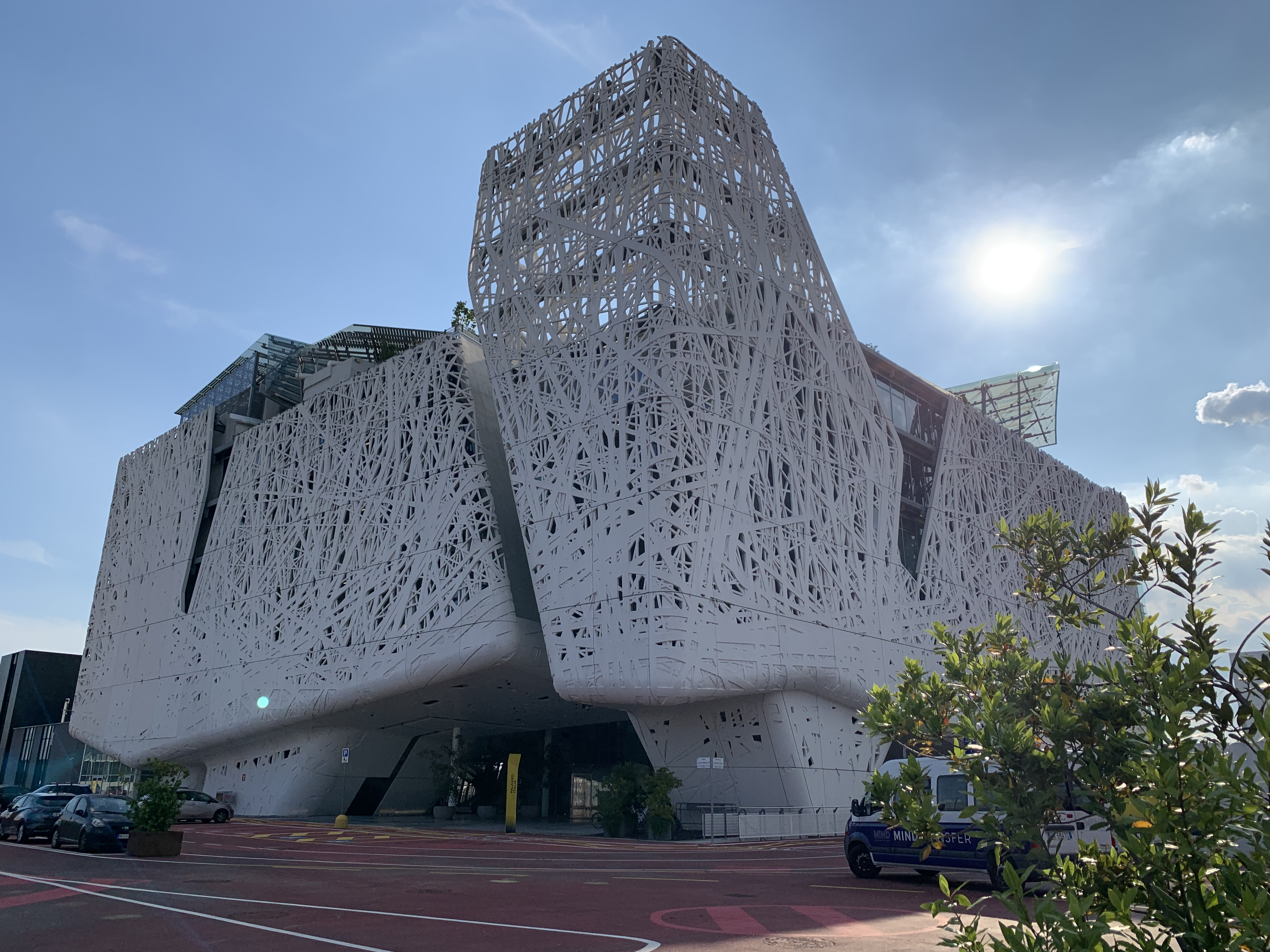
Palazzo Italia, headquarters of Human Technopole

Human Technopole is headquartered in Palazzo Italia, the former Italian pavilion of Expo 2015 located in the MIND Milano Innovation District in Milan.

Covering approximately 30,000 square meters, the campus consists of five main buildings:

- Palazzo Italia – headquarters of Human Technopole
- Incubator Labs – laboratory buildings and cryo-electron microscopy support facilities
- North Pavilion – imaging facilities including cryo-electron microscopy and optical microscopy
- South Pavilion – experimental research laboratories and genome engineering facilities
- South Building – a major new building currently under construction that will host laboratories for about 800 scientists as well as offices and training spaces.

== Research ==
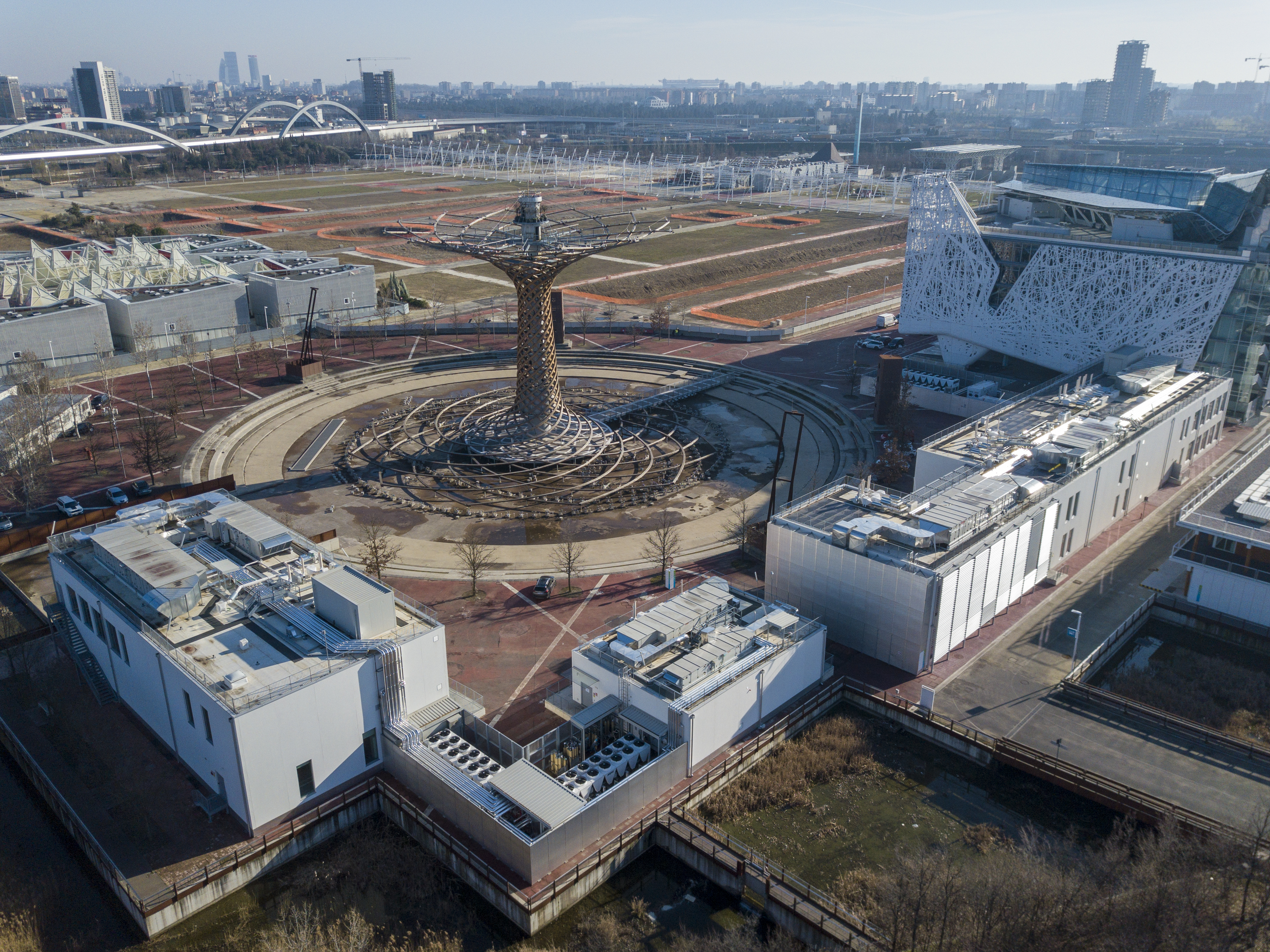
HT Campus

Human Technopole focuses on research in human biology with the aim of improving understanding of human health and disease.

Research at the institute aims develop new therapeutic strategies for several groups of diseases, including:

- cancer and cardiovascular diseases
- neurodegenerative and neurodevelopmental disorders such as autism and intellectual disabilities
- rare and orphan diseases such as primary ciliary dyskinesia
- respiratory diseases such as cystic fibrosis.

The institute combines fundamental research with translational research aimed at improving medical understanding and treatment of disease. Its research focuses on the biological mechanisms that regulate human physiology and disease, with the goal of developing new therapeutic strategies.

== National Facilities ==
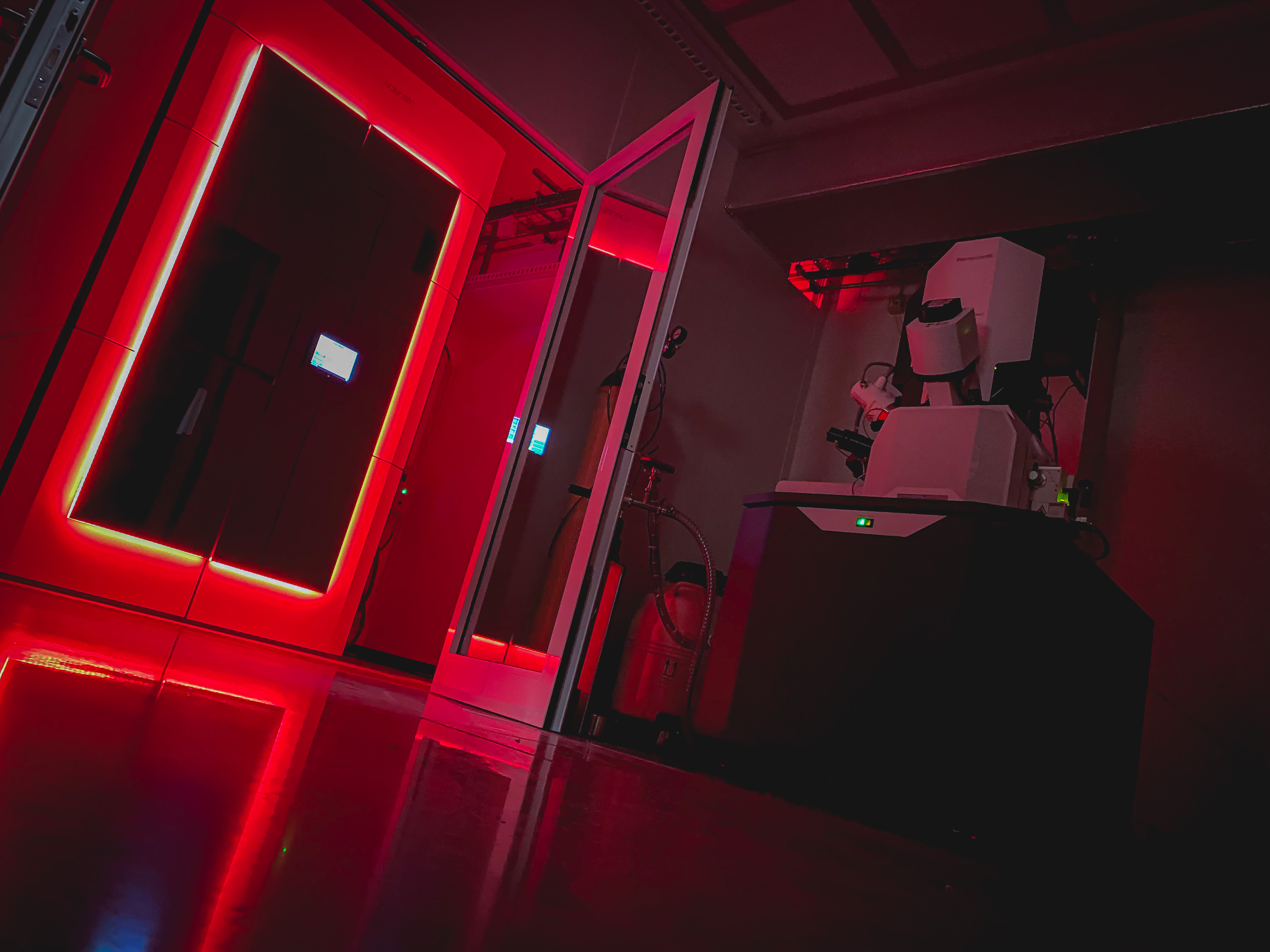
Cryo-electron microscope available through the national structural biology platform

Following a consultation process and under Italian Law 160/2019, the Human Technopole supervisory board approved the creation of five national technological facilities to support the Italian research community.

These facilities include:

- National Facility for Genomics
- National Facility for Genome Engineering & Disease Modelling
- National Facility for Structural Biology
- National Facility for Light Imaging
- National Facility for Data Handling & Analysis

The first call for access to these platforms, launched in 2024, supported hundreds of research projects across Italy.

== See also ==
- Genomics
- Computational biology
- Neuroscience
- Scientific research
