= Robert Huber =

German biochemist and Nobel laureate (born 1937)

Robert Huber ForMemRS
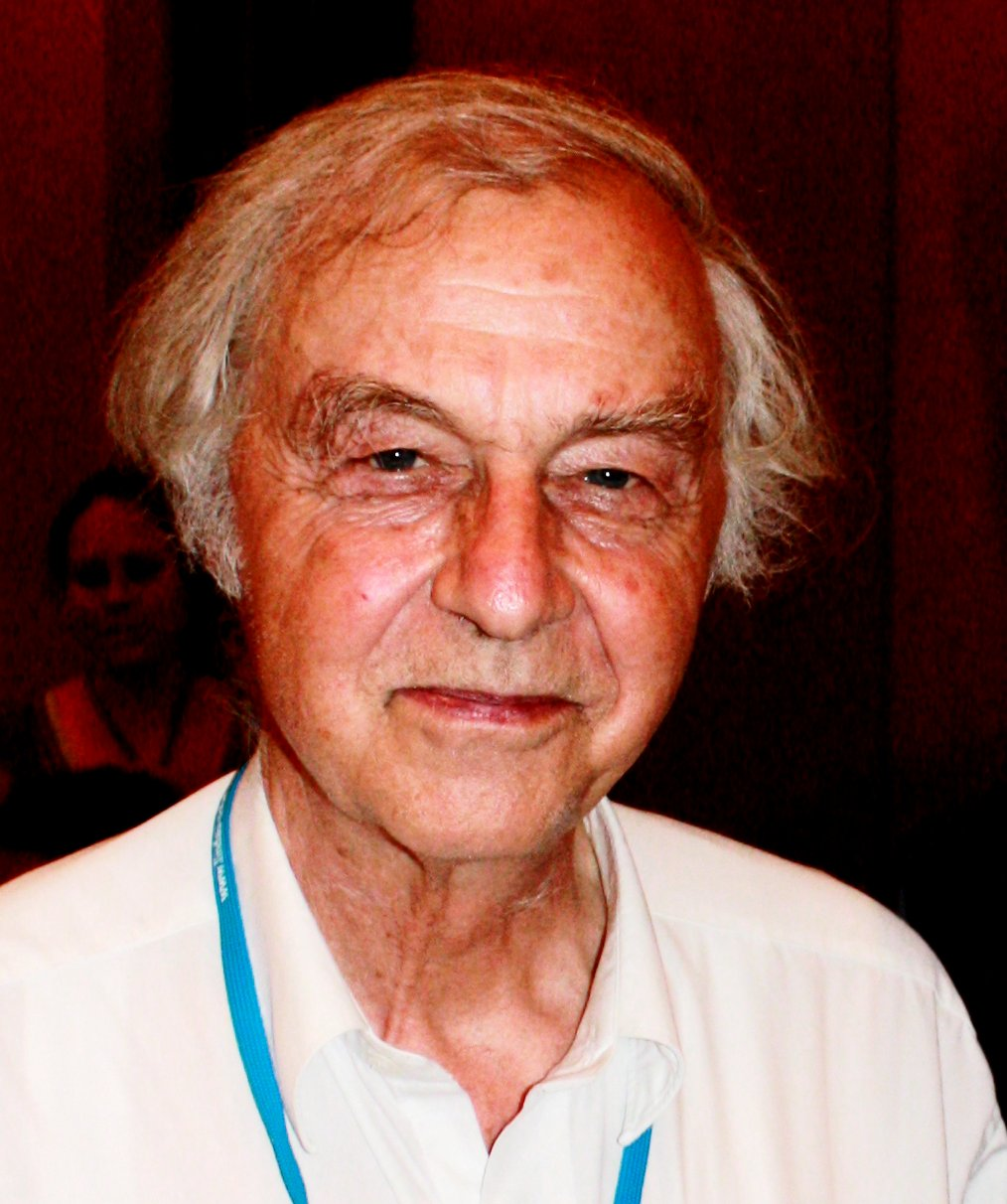
- Robert Huber in 2010
- Born: 20 February 1937 (age 89); Munich
- Education: Technical University of Munich
- Known for: Cyanobacteria Crystallography
- Awards: Nobel Prize in Chemistry (1988)
- Scientific career
- Fields: Biochemist
- Doctoral students: Nediljko Budisa
- Other notable students: Peter Colman (postdoc)
- Website: www.biochem.mpg.de/en/eg/huber

Robert Huber (German pronunciation: [ˈʁoːbɛʁt ˈhuːbɐ]; born 20 February 1937) is a German biochemist and Nobel laureate. known for his work crystallizing an intramembrane protein important in photosynthesis and subsequently applying X-ray crystallography to elucidate the protein's structure.

== Early life and education ==
He was born on 20 February 1937 in Munich, where his father, Sebastian, was a bank cashier. He was educated at the Humanistisches Karls-Gymnasium from 1947 to 1956 and then studied chemistry at the Technische Hochschule, receiving his diploma in 1960. He stayed and did research into using crystallography to elucidate the structure of organic compounds.

== Career ==
In 1971, he became a director at the Max Planck Institute for Biochemistry, where his team developed methods for the crystallography of proteins.

In 1988, he received the Nobel Prize for Chemistry jointly with Johann Deisenhofer and Hartmut Michel. The trio were recognized for their work in first crystallizing an intramembrane protein important in photosynthesis in purple bacteria, and subsequently applying X-ray crystallography to elucidate the protein's structure. The information provided the first insight into the structural bodies that performed the integral function of photosynthesis. This insight could be translated to understand the more complex analogue of photosynthesis in cyanobacteria which is essentially the same as that in chloroplasts of higher plants.

In 2006, he took up a post at the Cardiff University to spearhead the development of Structural Biology at the university on a part-time basis.

Since 2005, he has been doing research at the Centre for Medical Biotechnology of the University of Duisburg-Essen.

Huber was one of the original editors of the Encyclopedia of Analytical Chemistry.

== Awards and honours ==
In 1977 Huber was awarded the Otto Warburg Medal. In 1988 he was awarded the Nobel Prize and in 1992 the Sir Hans Krebs Medal. Huber was elected a member of Pour le Mérite for Sciences and Arts, in 1993 and Foreign Member of the Royal Society (ForMemRS) in 1999. His certificate of election reads:

Huber has built up, led and still leads the most productive protein crystallography laboratory in Europe. His own contributions to crystallography, made over a period of some 25 years, are prodigious. For his PhD thesis he solved the chemical formula of the important insect hormone edtyson which had eluded the chemists. He then demonstrated that the tertiary fold of the polypeptide chain in the haemoglobin of the fly larva chironomus closely resembled that in Kendrew's sperm whale myoglobin, indicating for the first time that this fold had been preserved throughout evolution.

Huber's next achievement was the solution of the structure of trypsin inhibitor and the demonstration that in its complex with trypsin it mimicked the tetrahedral transition state of the enzyme's substrate. Since then he has determined the structures of many other proteinases, their inactive precursors and their inhibitors, and has established himself as the world authority in this field. Outstanding structures are those of procarboxypeptidase, which led to the discovery of the remarkable activation mechanism of this enzyme, and of the complex of thrombin with hirudin, which showed the molecular mechanism of inhibition of blood clotting by this leech toxin.

In parallel with this work, Huber solved the structures of several immunoglobulin fragments. He was the first to determine the structure of the complement-activating F-fragment, which was also the first variable and the first constant domains in Fab-fragments.

Huber's structure of citrate synthase revealed a striking example of a conformational change undergone by an enzyme on combination with its substrate by a process of induced fit. Huber shared the Nobel Prize for Chemistry in 1988 with Michel and Deisenhofer for their determination of the remarkable and supremely important structures of the photochemical reaction centre of Rhodopseudomonas viridis and of phycocyanin, the light harvesting protein of the blue-green alga Mastiglocadus laminosus. This protein binds linear tetrapyrroles in a tertiary fold reminiscent of the globins, which brought Huber back full circle to his first structure, erythrocruerin, Huber has also determined the structures of several copper-containing electron-transfer proteins, including that of ascorbate oxidase, and of other metallo-enzymes. These studies have thrown new light on electron-transfer systems and on zinc coordination in proteins. He has also solved the structure of an important class of calcium binding proteins – the annexins. Finally his very accurate structures have provided important insights into the different degrees of mobility within protein molecules.

Huber has published some 400 papers.

== Personal life ==
Huber is married and has four children.
