= European Society of Gene and Cell Therapy =

European Society of Gene & Cell Therapy (ESGCT) formerly European Society of Gene Therapy (ESGT) is a legally registered professional body which emerged from a small working group in 1992 that focused on human gene therapy.

The objectives of the ESGT include the following:

- promote basic and clinical research in gene therapy;
- facilitate education (and the exchange of information and technologies) related to gene transfer and therapy;
- serve as a professional adviser to the gene therapy community and various regulatory bodies in Europe.

The official journal of the ESGT is The Journal of Gene Medicine.

== Collaborations ==
The ESGT works with other entities in the scientific communities in the event that an adverse effect to a specific gene therapy is discovered. Investigations the ESGT has been involved with include the adverse effects discovered during the French X-SCID gene therapy trial. The ESGT hosted a forum of 500 researchers from various facilities around the world, including representatives from the Stanford University and the Sloan Kettering Cancer Research Center.
