= Louis-Jeantet Foundation =

Swiss foundation

The Louis-Jeantet Foundation was set up in Geneva in 1982 according to the wish of the Geneva-resident French businessman Louis Jeantet, having been endowed with his fortune upon his death from cancer in 1981. The Foundation commenced activities in 1983.

It funds the Louis-Jeantet Prize, and a number of professorships at the Faculty of Medicine of the University of Geneva.

Inspired from the luxurious Italian houses and built in the early XXth century, the Louis-Jeantet Villa is part of the architectural heritage of the Geneva landscape. Classified as an historic building in 1983, the Villa was abandoned for a long period of time before the Louis-Jeantet Foundation decided to establish its headquarters in this unique place and to totally restore the Villa.
Located in the residential area of Florissant, the Louis-Jeantet Centre opened its doors in 1998. The Centre offers both the distinction of a patrician Neo-renaissance residence and the sobriety of a contemporary Auditorium.

The grounds of Geneva's Fondation Louis-Jeantet contain a 15 by 15 sq. m. courtyard within a sunken hortus conclusus (i.e. an enclosed garden) with an area of about 1300 sq. m.

In 1904 Aimée Wexel, princess Franceschi, commissioned the so-called « Helios » villa, built in the neo-renaissance style very popular in Italy at the end of the 19th century. The land was formerly part of the Rieu estate.
The mansion’s name is linked to the last proprietor, Dr Henri Enach Edelstein. After his death, its conservation was the object of heated debate. It nearly burnt down in 1984, but was salvaged from demolition and entirely restored for the « Fondation Louis-Jeantet de Médecine » at the end of the 20th century. The Domino architects bureau and TER landscape designers oversaw the restoration.
The mansion now houses a modern auditorium in the basement, graced by a garden excavated from the rock. These elements, invisible from the road (route de Florissant), offer a secluded area inspired by Mogol gardens of Rajasthan.
