= Membrane ruffling =

Within molecular and cell biology membrane ruffling (also known as cell ruffling) is the formation of a motile cell surface that contains a meshwork of newly polymerized actin filaments. It can also be regarded as one of the earliest structural changes observed in the cell. The GTP-binding protein Rac is the regulator of this membrane ruffling. Changes in the Polyphosphoinositide metabolism and changes in Ca^{2+} level of the cell may also play an important role. A number of actin-binding and organizing proteins localize to membrane ruffles and potentially target to transducing molecules.

== Characteristic feature of migrating cells ==
Membrane ruffling is a characteristic feature of many actively migrating cells. When the membrane is unable to attach to the substrate, the membrane protrusion is recycled back into the cell. The ruffling of membranes is thought to be controlled by a group of enzymes known as Rho GTPases, specifically RhoA, Rac1 and cdc42.

== Bacterial infection ==
Some bacteria such as enteropathogenic E. coli and enterohemorrhagic E. coli can induce membrane ruffling by secreting toxins via the type three secretion system and modifying the host cytoskeleton. Such toxins include EspT, Map, and SopE, which mimic RhoGEF and activate endogenous Rho GTPases to manipulate actin polymerisation in the infected cell.

== See also ==
- Filopodia
- Lamellipodia
