= Journal of Gene Medicine =

Medical journal

- Subject: Gene therapy
- Language: English
- Edited by: Gening Jiang

Publication details
- History: 1999–present
- Publisher: John Wiley & Sons
- Frequency: Monthly
- Impact factor: 4.565 (2020)

Standard abbreviations
- ISO 4: J. Gene Med.

Indexing
- CODEN: JGMEFG
- ISSN: 1099-498X (print); 1521-2254 (web)
- LCCN: sn98002340
- OCLC no.: 1064505351

Links
- Journal homepage; Online access; Online archive

The Journal of Gene Medicine is a monthly peer-reviewed medical journal covering gene therapy and other uses of genetic technologies for medical purposes. It was established in 1999 and is published by John Wiley & Sons. The editors-in-chief is Gening Jiang (Tongji University). According to the Journal Citation Reports, the journal has a 2020 impact factor of 4.565, ranking it 43rd out of 160 journals in the category "Biotechnology & Applied Microbiology".
