= Ulrich K. Laemmli =

Swiss biochemist

- Born: 1940 (age 85–86); Schaffhausen, Switzerland
- Known for: SDS-PAGE
- Awards: Louis-Jeantet Prize for Medicine (1996); Marcel Benoist Prize (1988)
- Scientific career
- Fields: Biochemistry
- Workplaces: University of Geneva

Ulrich K. Laemmli (born 1940), real name Lämmli, is a Professor in the biochemistry and molecular biology departments at University of Geneva. He is known for the refinement of SDS-PAGE, a widely used method for separating proteins based on their electrophoretic mobility. His paper describing the method is among the most cited scholarly journal articles of all time. His current research involves studying the structural organization of nuclei and chromatin within the cell.

== Career ==
Laemmli received a PhD in 1969 at the University of Geneva under Eduard Kellenberger. His thesis was titled "The assembly of the head of bacteriophage T4". He conducted a postdoctoral fellowship at the MRC Laboratory of Molecular Biology under Aaron Klug.

== Major scientific contributions ==
Although electrophoresis was used to separate proteins before Laemmli's work, he made significant improvements to the method. The term "Laemmli buffer" is often used to describe an SDS-containing buffer that is used to prepare (denature) samples for SDS-PAGE.

== Awards and honors ==
- Louis-Jeantet Prize for Medicine – 1996
- Elected fellow of the American Association for the Advancement of Science – 2006
