= Dirk Görlich =

German biochemist

Dirk Görlich, born October 18, 1966, in Halle (Saale) of Germany, is a German biochemist. He is now director at the Max Planck Institute for Multidisciplinary Sciences in Göttingen.

His research focuses on cellular logistics, the transport mechanism of proteins in cells between the nucleus and the cytoplasm. Görlich became a member of the German National Academy of Sciences Leopoldina in 2005. He is also a member of the European Molecular Biology Organization.

In 2022, Görlich won the inaugural WLA Prize in Life Science or Medicine, “for key discoveries elucidating the mechanism and selectivity of protein transport between the cytoplasm and nucleus.”

== Education and career ==
Dirk Görlich went to the Martin Luther University Halle-Wittenberg (Halle/Saale) in 1985 and received his Master's Degree in Biochemistry here in 1989. From 1990 to 1993, he worked as a research assistant in the laboratory of Tom Rapoport. In 1993, he received his Ph.D. from the Humboldt University of Berlin.

From 1993 to 1995, Görlich finished his postdoctoral research in R.A Laskey's lab in Cambridge. From 1996 to 2007, he worked as the research group leader at the Center for Molecular Biology at the University of Heidelberg. Since 2001, he started to work as a professor of Molecular Biology at the University of Heidelberg, until 2007.

Görlich assumed the role of Director at the Max Planck Institute of Biophysical Chemistry in 2005, which later was merged as the Max Planck Institute for Multidisciplinary Sciences with Max Planck Institute for Experimental Medicine on January 1, 2022.

== Honors and awards ==
1993 - Karl Lohmann Prize of German Society for Biological Chemistry

1994 - Falcon Prize of German Society for Cell Biology

1997 - EMBO Gold Medal of European Molecular Biology Organization

1997 - Elected member of EMBO

1997 - Heinz Maier-Leibnitz Prize of German Research Foundation

2001 - Alfried Krupp Sponsorship Award, Alfried Krupp von Bohlen und Halbach Foundation

2005 - Elected member of the German National Academy of Sciences Leopoldina

2018 - Animal Welfare Research Prize by German's Federal Ministry of Food and Agriculture, together with Tino Pleiner,

2022 - WLA Prize in Life Science or Medicine,

2024 - Louis-Jeantet Prize for Medicine.

2025 - Albert Lasker Award for Basic Medical Research.
