= BrainChip =

Neuromorphic tech company

BrainChip Holdings Ltd.
- Company type: Public
- Traded as: ASX: BRN; OTCQX: BRCHF
- Industry: Artificial Intelligence hardware and software provider Semiconductor Design & Manufacturing
- Founded: 2004
- Founder: Peter van der Made
- Headquarters: Sydney, NSW, Australia
- Area served: Worldwide
- Key people: Sean Hehir (CEO) Peter van der Made (Founder and Member of the BoD and SAB) Tony Lewis (CTO, Chairman of the SAB) Anil Mankar (Co-founder, Retired) Ken Scarince (Chief Financial Officer) Steven Brightfield (Chief Marketing Officer) Steve Thorne (Vice President of Worldwide Sales) Jonathan Tapson (Vice President of Engineering) Professor Dr. Jason K. Eshraghian, (Member of the SAB) Professor Dr. André van Schaik (Member of the SAB)
- Website: https://brainchip.com/

BrainChip (ASX:BRN, OTCQX:BRCHF) is an Australia-based technology company, founded in 2004 by Peter Van Der Made, that specializes in developing advanced artificial intelligence (AI) and machine learning (ML) hardware. The company's primary products are the MetaTF development environment, which allows the training and deployment of spiking neural networks (SNN), and the AKD1000 neuromorphic processor, a hardware implementation of their spiking neural network system. BrainChip's technology is based on a neuromorphic computing architecture, which attempts to mimic the way the human brain works. The company is a member of Intel Foundry Services and Arm AI partnership.

== History ==
Australian mining company Aziana acquired BrainChip in March 2015. Later, via a reverse merger of the now dormant Aziana in September 2015 BrainChip was put on the Australian Stock Exchange (ASX), and van der Made started commercializing his original idea for artificial intelligence processor hardware. In 2016, the company appointed former Exar CEO Louis Di Nardo as CEO; Van Der Made then took the position of CTO. In October 2021, the company announced that it was taking orders for its Akida AI Processor Development Kits, and in January 2022, that it was taking orders for its Akida AI Processor PCIe boards. In April 2022, BrainChip partnered with NVISO to provide collaboration with applications and technologies. In November 2022, BrainChip added the Rochester Institute of Technology to its University AI accelerator program. The next month, BrainChip was a part of Intel Foundry Services. In January 2023, Edge Impulse announced support for BrainChip's AKD processor.

== MetaTF ==
The MetaTF software is designed to work with a variety of image, video, and sensor data, and is intended to be implemented in a range of applications, including security, surveillance, autonomous vehicles, and industrial automation. The software uses Python to create spiking neural networks (or convert other neural networks to SNNs) for use on the AKD processor hardware. The software is also capable of SNN deployment on normal processors.

== The AKD processor ==
The Akida 1000 processor is an event-based neural processing device with 1.2 million artificial neurons and 10 billion artificial synapses. Utilizing event-based processing, it analyzes essential inputs at specific points. Results are stored in the on-chip memory units.

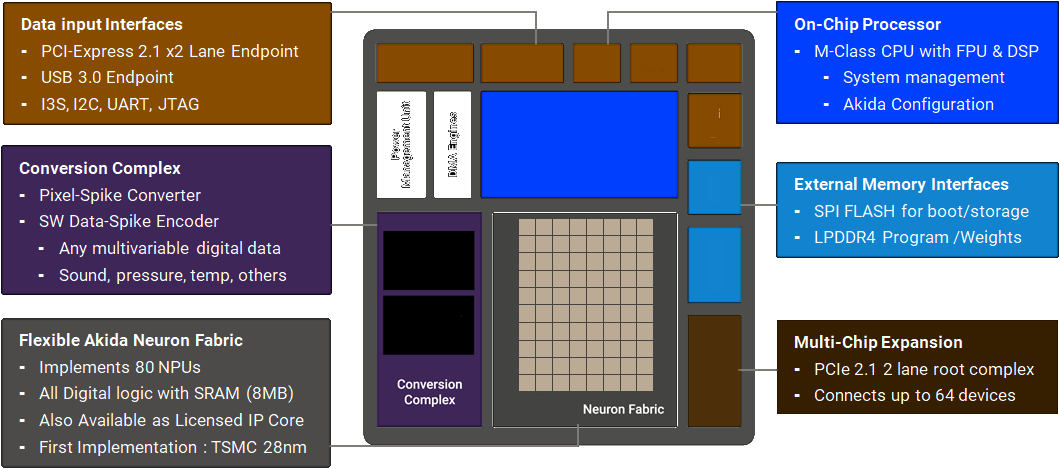
AKD1000 processor block diagram

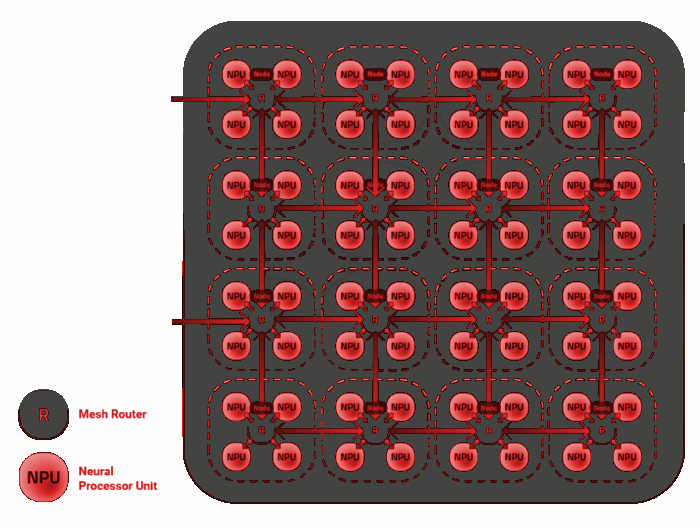
BrainChip NPU Mesh

The processor contains 80 nodes that communicate over a mesh network. Each node consists of four either convolutional or fully connected Neural Processing Units (NPUs), coupled with individual memory units. Akida runs an entire neural network executing all neuron layers in parallel. The design elements are meant to allow inference and incremental learning on edge devices with lower power consumption.

On 29 January 2023, BrainChip announced that it has completed the design of its AKD1500 reference chip. On March 6, 2023, BrainChip announced the second generation of its Akida platform. BrainChip added support for 8-bit weights and activations, Vision Transformer (ViT) engine, and hardware support for a Temporal Event-Based Neural Net (TENN).

On 12 March 2023, BrainChip announced that the Akida processor family integrates with the Arm® Cortex®-M85 processor.

== See also ==
- Cognitive computer
- Spiking neural network
- S&P/ASX 200
- Neuromorphic engineering
