= Tobias Walther =

American cell biologist

Tobias C. Walther is the chair of the cell biology program at the Sloan Kettering Institute in New York City and a professor at Weill Cornell School of Medicine, where he co-directs the Farese and Walther lab. He has been a Howard Hughes Medical Institute investigator since 2015. His primary responsibilities are to provide leadership in research and teaching in the scientific fields of metabolism, membrane biology and lipids.

Walther's laboratory research seeks to understand the mechanisms that regulate lipid metabolism, lipid storage, and lipid function in membranes or as signaling molecules. Walther's research is focused on the mechanisms by which cells regulate their lipid content and the impact of intracellular lipids on cellular functioning. The laboratory also investigates lipid metabolism in human pathologies, such as cancer and neurodegenerative disease.

Walther was an associate professor of cell biology at the Yale School of Medicine. While at Yale, Walther positioned his laboratory at the forefront of the rapidly growing field of lipid droplet biology. His group extensively studied proteins required to adjust lipid droplet size and composition according to the cellular state. Additionally, his research focused on organelle biogenesis and membrane biology. At Yale, Walther also oversaw the High Throughput Cell Biology Center at Yale's West Campus. Moving to Harvard, Walther is working in a scientific partnership with Robert V. Farese, Jr., on the biochemistry, cell biology, and genetics of lipid metabolism and homeostasis. For their research, Farese and Walther have been using a variety of state-of-the systems biology approaches, such as mass spectrometry-based proteomics and high-content screening.

From 2014 to 2022, Walther was a professor at Harvard and the Executive Director of the Harvard Chan School Analytics Center and Director of the Harvard Chan Research Center on Causes and Prevention of Cardiovascular Disease.

Walther was selected as an American Society for Cell Biology Fellow in 2020. He also is the recipient of the 2021 ASBMB-Merck Award for outstanding contributions in biochemistry and molecular biology (together with Robert Farese, Jr.)

== Education ==
Walther received his PhD in biology from the European Molecular Biology Laboratory and LMU Munich in 2002. Walther then joined the Department of Biochemistry and Biophysics at the University of California, San Francisco, to complete his postdoctoral studies. After completion of his postdoctoral training, Walther became group leader at the Max Planck Institute of Biochemistry in Martinsried, Germany. In 2010, Walther relocated his lab from Germany to the United States and was appointed as an associate professor of Cell Biology at the Yale School of Medicine, and in 2014 to Harvard Cell Biology and Harvard Molecular Metabolism.
