= John P. Richard =

American chemist and academic

- Occupations: Chemist and academic

Academic background
- Education: B.S., Biochemistry (1974); Ph.D., Chemistry (1979)
- Alma mater: Ohio State University

John P. Richard is a chemist and academic. He is a SUNY Distinguished Professor at the University at Buffalo.

Richard has studied problems related to the mechanisms for organic reactions and their catalysis by enzymes, and has worked to test different theories to explain how enzymes achieve their rate accelerations. He has edited or co-edited 17 books and has published more than 250 articles and book chapters on his research. He is the recipient of the numerous awards, including UB Sustained Achievement Award, Jacob Schoellkopf Medal, and NIH MIRA Award.

Richard is a Fellow of the American Chemical Society (ACS), and was Secretary of the ACS Division of Biological Chemistry from 2003 to 2008.

== Education and early career ==
Richard earned his B.S. degree in biochemistry from The Ohio State University in 1974. He pursued his graduate studies at the same university, working with Perry A. Frey. Following this, he served as a Postdoctoral Fellow with William Jencks at Brandeis University from 1979 to 1982.

== Career ==
Richard began his academic career in 1985 as an assistant professor in the University of Kentucky, where he was promoted to associate professor in 1990. In 1993, he joined the University at Buffalo, SUNY as an associate professor. He was promoted to Professor in 1995 and to SUNY Distinguished Professor in 2019.

Richard served as the co-chair for GRC on Enzymes, Coenzymes & Metabolic Pathways in 2006, the Chair of the GRC on Isotopes in Biological & Chemical Sciences in 2010, and the co-chair of the Winter Enzyme Mechanisms Conference in 2011. He was a member of the Organizing Committee for Reaction Mechanisms VII (2005), the 12th Kyushu International Symposium on Physical Organic Chemistry (2009), and the Winter Enzyme Mechanisms Conferences in 2015 and 2017.

== Research ==
Richard has conducted parallel studies on the mechanisms for organic reactions in aqueous solution and at enzyme active sites in order to define the root causes for enzymatic rate accelerations. The focus of many of these studies has been on the characterization of the lifetimes and thermodynamic stability for carbocation and carbanion intermediates of organic reactions in water and the determination of the mechanisms for their stabilization by enzyme catalysts.

=== Formation and stability of carbocations and carbanions in water ===
Richard's postdoctoral work described the use of an azide anion clock to determine the lifetimes of carbocation intermediates of solvolysis reactions. He showed that these lifetimes sometimes enforce the mechanisms for nucleophilic substitution at aliphatic carbon. Richard and Amyes next reported novel methods for determination of the pK_{a}s of weak carbon acids in water, and their application in the determination of the effect of a spectrum of organic functional groups on carbon acid pK_{a}. His work has focused on creating a model to rationalize the large effects of resonance electron-donating or accepting substituents on the lifetimes of carbocation and carbanion intermediates of organic reactions.

=== Formation and stability of carbocations and carbanions at enzyme active sites ===
Richard has worked to draw comparisons between the mechanisms for the formation of carbocations and carbanions in water and at enzyme active sites. His application of the azide ion clock to the characterization of the oxocarbocation intermediate of ß-galactosidase-catalyzed hydrolysis of lactose showed that the intermediate is stabilized by interactions with the protein catalyst. His comparison of the pKas for the weakly acidic C-6 hydrogen of uridine monophosphate in water and at the active site of orotidine 5'-monophosphate decarboxylate demonstrated that there is a large stabilization of the UMP carbanion reaction intermediate by interactions with the protein catalyst. This was one key result from studies to characterize the mechanism of action of an enzyme that operates at peak catalytic efficiency. His investigations on the glycolytic enzyme triosephosphate isomerase revealed the mechanism by which the catalyst operates to increase the driving force for proton transfer from the enzyme-bound carbon acid to the protein.

=== Bioorganic and bioinorganic reaction mechanisms ===
Richard's investigations on the nonenzymatic isomerization and elimination reactions of triosephosphates have shed light on the origin of cellular methylglyoxal, a toxic compound that is neutralized by the action of glyoxalase I and II. His work has led to the identification of novel nonenzymatic Claisen and aldol condensation reactions of pyridoxal cofactor analogs, and results from collaborative studies with Crugeiras and Rios provide a characterization of the kinetics and thermodynamics for proton transfer reactions at pyridoxal-amino acid adducts. In collaboration with Richard Nagorski, it was demonstrated that Zn^{2+} catalyzes aldose-ketose isomerization through competing proton and hydride transfer mechanisms. This finding was predicted because the two mechanisms are followed by enzymes such as triosephosphate isomerase (proton transfer) and xylose isomerase (hydride transfer). Alongside Janet Morrow, Richard investigated small molecule metal-ion catalysts of phosphate diester hydrolysis in work that characterized cooperativity in catalysis by binuclear complexes and demonstrated that these complexes achieve enzyme-like rate accelerations.

=== Role of substrate-driven conformational changes in enzyme catalysis ===
Richard and Amyes discovered that many enzyme-catalyzed reactions of phosphodianion truncated substrates are activated by phosphite dianion. These enzymes utilize binding energy of the substrate phosphodianion to drive a change in protein conformation that traps the substrate at an active-site cage; this is equivalent to the substrate-induced fits first described by Daniel Koshand. The activating substrate-driven enzyme conformational changes result in the differential binding of enzymatic ground and transition states that is a required property of the most proficient enzyme catalysts. This model has provided a simple rationalization for the activation of adenylate kinase-catalyzed phosphoryl group transfer from adenosine triphosphate to phosphite dianion by the substrate fragment adenosine, as well as for the activation of formate dehydrogenase-catalyzed hydride transfer from formate to nicotinamide riboside by the substrate fragment ADP. The latter finding confirmed a proposal by W. P. Jencks that evolution has produced cofactors composed of small reactive functionalities connected to larger nonreactive fragments that provide large intrinsic binding energies for stabilization of enzymatic transition states.

== Awards and honors ==
- 2003 – Walton Visitor Fellow, University College, Dublin, Ireland
- 2009 – Jacob Schoellkopf Medal, ACS Western New York Section
- 2014 – Fellow, American Chemical Society
- 2020 – MIRA Award, NIH

=== Selected publications ===
- Richard, J. P. (1993). Mechanism for the formation of methylglyoxal from triosephosphates. Biochemical Society Transactions, 21(2), 549–553.
- Iranzo, O., Kovalevsky, A. Y., Morrow, J. R., & Richard, J. P. (2003). Physical and kinetic analysis of the cooperative role of metal ions in catalysis of phosphodiester cleavage by a dinuclear Zn (II) complex. Journal of the American Chemical Society, 125(7), 1988–1993.
- Amyes, T. L., Diver, S. T., Richard, J. P., Rivas, F. M., & Toth, K. (2004). Formation and stability of N-heterocyclic carbenes in water: the carbon acid p K a of imidazolium cations in aqueous solution. Journal of the American Chemical Society, 126(13), 4366–4374.
- Richard, J. P. (2019). Protein flexibility and stiffness enable efficient enzymatic catalysis. Journal of the American Chemical Society, 141(8), 3320–3331.
- Richard, J. P. (2022). Enabling role of ligand-driven conformational changes in enzyme evolution. Biochemistry, 61(15), 1533–1542.
