= Nobuyo Maeda =

Japanese geneticist

- Born: Early 1950s Sendai, Miyagi Prefecture, Japan
- Education: Tohoku University
- Occupation: Robert H. Wagner Distinguished Professor
- Years active: 1978-
- Known for: Creating the first mouse model for atherosclerosis
- Medical career
- Institutions: University of North Carolina at Chapel Hill
- Sub-specialties: Genetics, medical research
- Awards: Method to Extend Research in Time (MERIT) Award of the National Heart, Lung, and Blood Institute

Nobuyo N. Maeda is a Japanese geneticist and medical researcher, who works on complex human diseases including atherosclerosis, diabetes and high blood pressure, and is particularly known for creating the first mouse model for atherosclerosis. Maeda has worked in the United States since 1978; as of 2017, she is the Robert H. Wagner Distinguished Professor at the University of North Carolina at Chapel Hill.

== Early life and education ==
Maeda was born in Sendai, Miyagi Prefecture, Japan in the early 1950s, the second of three sisters. Her father was a chemical engineering professor. She attended Tohoku University in Sendai, where she received a BSc in chemistry (1972) and an MSc in bio-organic chemistry (1974), followed by a PhD in the same subject in 1977; her thesis was entitled "Isolation and characterization of neurotoxins from the venoms of sea snakes, and the use of amino acid sequences in taxonomy".

== Career and awards ==
Maeda first briefly worked in the laboratory of Nobuo Tamiya at the Department of Chemistry of Tohoku University. In 1978, she left Japan for the United States, and worked for a decade at the University of Wisconsin–Madison. She held post-doctoral positions in the laboratories of Walter M. Fitch (Department of Physiological Chemistry; 1978–81) and Oliver Smithies (Laboratory of Genetics; 1981–83), and then worked in the Laboratory of Genetics as an assistant and then associate scientist.

She moved to the Department of Pathology of the University of North Carolina at Chapel Hill in 1988, with her collaborator (and later husband) Smithies, where she held successively positions as associate professor (1988) and professor (1996), and was appointed the Robert H. Wagner Distinguished Professor at the Department of Pathology and Laboratory Medicine in 2003. She is also an adjunct professor in the Department of Nutrition (from 2000) and has directed the university's pre-doctoral training program in vascular biology since 2002.

She was awarded the Method to Extend Research in Time (MERIT) Award of the National Heart, Lung, and Blood Institute (1998).

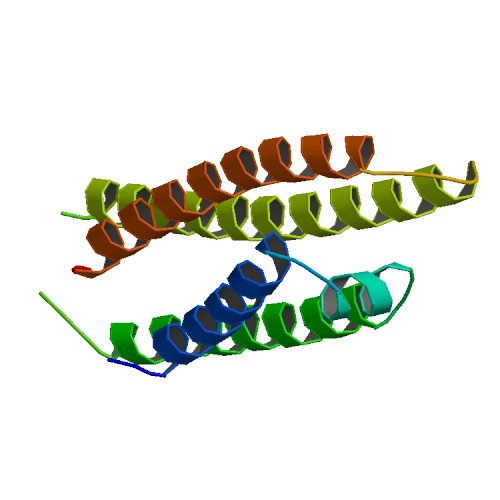
Human apolipoprotein E

== Research ==
Maeda's early work on sea snake venoms led to an interest in molecular evolution, which she pursued in Fitch's laboratory. She published in the 1980s on molecular evolution in higher primates such as chimpanzees and humans. Her work focused on the large mutational effects of recombination between members of multigene families, particularly in the human haptoglobin gene cluster.

In 1987, Maeda, Smithies and coworkers used the novel technique of gene targeting – a method of replacing single mouse genes using homologous recombination developed by Smithies, Mario Capecchi and others – to correct the hypoxanthine-guanine phosphoribosyltransferase gene responsible for Lesch–Nyhan syndrome in mouse cells in vitro. This was the second successful use of the technique to be published. Maeda then started to apply gene targeting to elucidate the function of lipoproteins, which had been shown by Jan and Judith Rapacz to be associated with atherosclerosis in domestic pigs. She was one of the first to apply gene-targeting methods to a complex, multifactorial disease, rather than single-gene disorders such as cystic fibrosis and Lesch–Nyhan syndrome. Maeda and her coworkers found that deleting the mouse gene for apolipoprotein E (ApoE) – a component of very low-density lipoprotein – caused the animals to develop elevated blood cholesterol levels and atherosclerosis within around 6 months, on a normal diet. The results were published in 1992, in a highly cited paper in Science. (Note: According to Google Scholar, as of 16 January 2017, the paper had been cited 2105 times.) The ApoE knockout (apoe^{−/−}) was the earliest mouse model of the disease, and has been widely used in atherosclerosis research. (Note: A group led by Jan L. Breslow at the Rockefeller University in New York also independently created ApoE knockouts that developed atherosclerosis in 1992.)

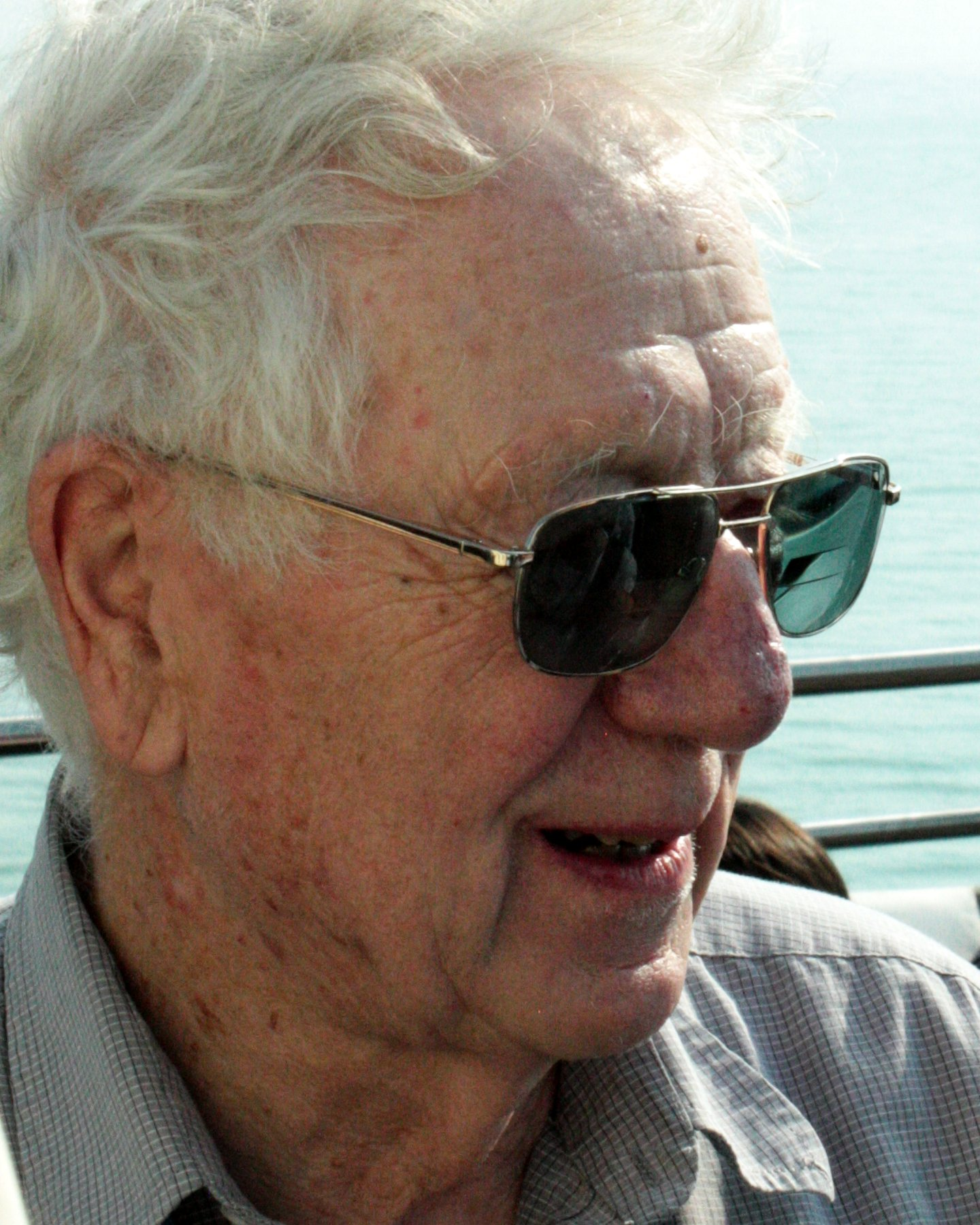
Oliver Smithies, Maeda's husband and long-term collaborator

Maeda's group subsequently carried out other gene-targeting experiments, including replacing the mouse gene for ApoE with common variants of the human gene. As of 2017, her research continues to focus on atherosclerosis, and encompasses molecular pathology as well as genetics. She also researches other multifactorial diseases, including diabetes and high blood pressure.

== Personal life ==
Maeda was married to the British-born geneticist Oliver Smithies (1925–2017).

== Selected publications ==
- Zhang, Sunny H.; Reddick, Robert L.; Piedrahita, Jorge A.; Maeda, Nobuyo (1992). "Spontaneous hypercholesterolemia and arterial lesions in mice lacking apolipoprotein E". Science. 258 (5081): 468–71. Bibcode:1992Sci...258..468Z. doi:10.1126/science.1411543. PMID 1411543.
- Piedrahita, J. A.; Zhang, S. H.; Hagaman, J. R.; Oliver, P. M.; Maeda, N. (1992). "Generation of mice carrying a mutant apolipoprotein E gene inactivated by gene targeting in embryonic stem cells". Proceedings of the National Academy of Sciences USA. 89 (10): 4471–75. Bibcode:1992PNAS...89.4471P. doi:10.1073/pnas.89.10.4471. PMC 49104. PMID 1584779.
- Doetschman, Thomas; Gregg, Ronald G.; Maeda, Nobuyo; Hooper, Martin L.; Melton, David W.; Thompson, Simon; Smithies, Oliver (1987). "Targetted correction of a mutant HPRT gene in mouse embryonic stem cells". Nature. 330 (6148): 576–78. Bibcode:1987Natur.330..576D. doi:10.1038/330576a0. PMID 3683574. S2CID 4350881.
