= Embryonic stem cell =

Type of pluripotent blastocystic stem cell

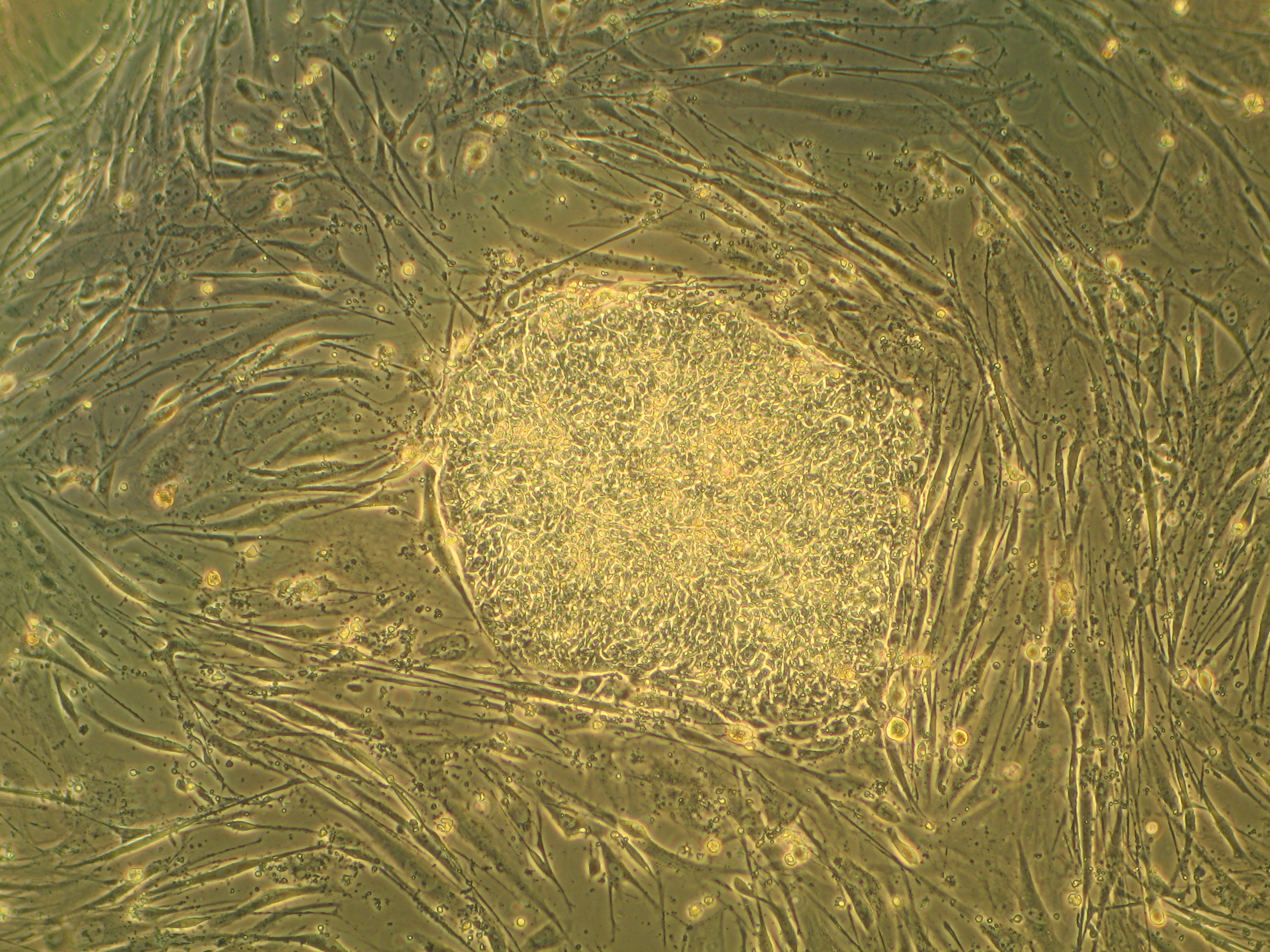
Human embryonic stem cells in cell culture

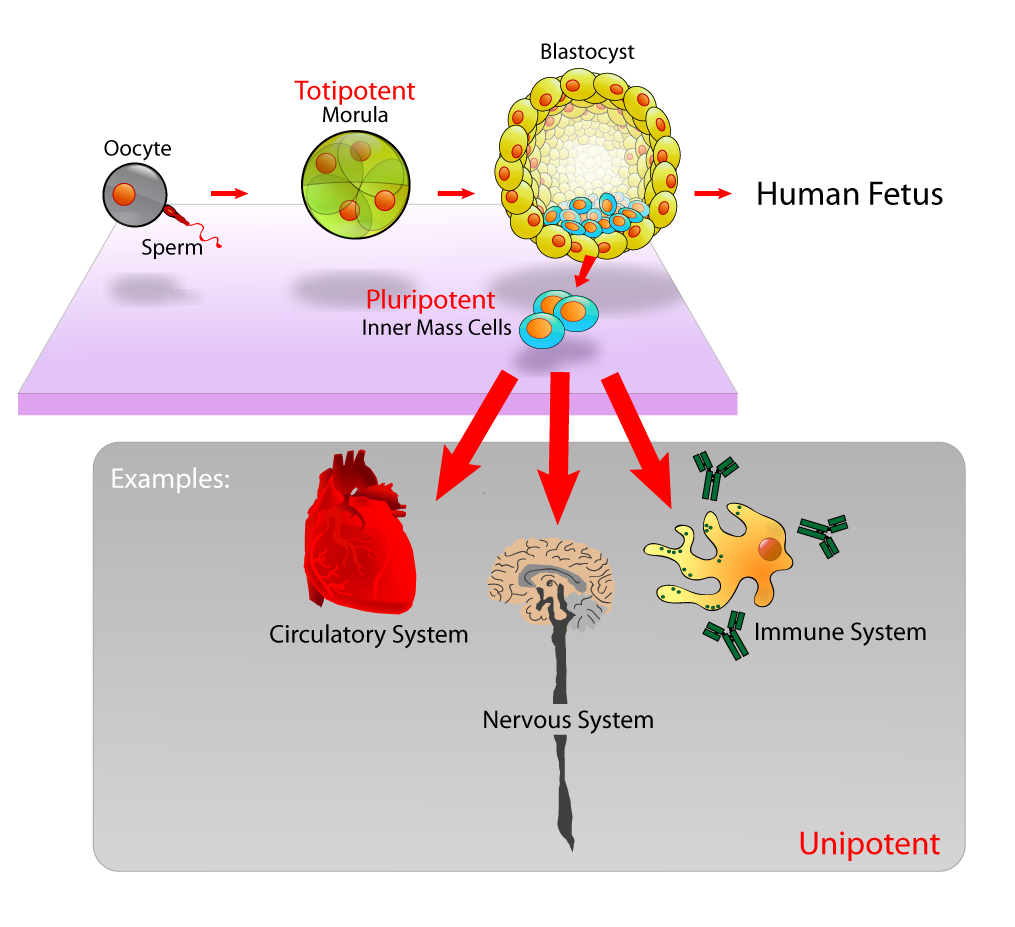
Pluripotent: Embryonic stem cells are able to develop into any type of cell, excepting those of the placenta. Only embryonic stem cells of the morula are totipotent: to develop into any type of cell, including those of the placenta.

Embryonic stem cells (ESCs) are pluripotent stem cells derived from the inner cell mass of a blastocyst, an early-stage pre-implantation embryo. Human embryos reach the blastocyst stage 4–5 days post fertilization, at which time they consist of 50–150 cells. Isolating the inner cell mass (embryoblast) using immunosurgery results in destruction of the blastocyst, a process which raises ethical issues, including whether or not embryos at the pre-implantation stage have the same moral considerations as embryos in the post-implantation stage of development.

Researchers focus heavily on the therapeutic potential of embryonic stem cells, with clinical use being the goal for many laboratories. Potential uses include the treatment of diabetes and heart disease. The cells are studied to be used as clinical therapies, models of genetic disorders, and cellular/DNA repair. However, adverse effects in the research and clinical processes such as tumors and unwanted immune responses have also been reported.

== Properties ==
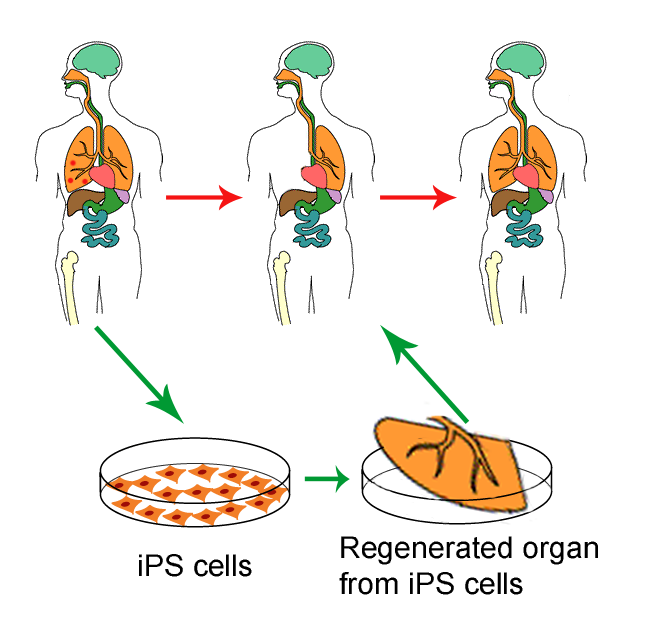
IPS Cell

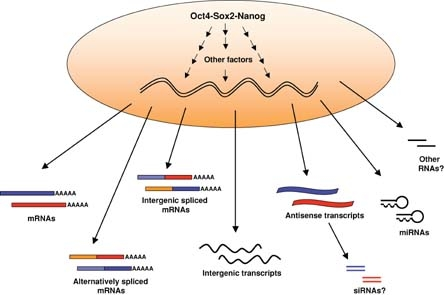
The transcriptome of embryonic stem cells

Embryonic stem cells (ESCs), derived from the blastocyst stage of early mammalian embryos, are distinguished by their ability to differentiate into any embryonic cell type and by their ability to self-renew. It is these traits that makes them valuable in the scientific and medical fields. ESCs have a normal karyotype, maintain high telomerase activity, and exhibit remarkable long-term proliferative potential.

=== Pluripotent ===
Embryonic stem cells of the inner cell mass are pluripotent, meaning they are able to differentiate to generate primitive ectoderm, which ultimately differentiates during gastrulation into all derivatives of the three primary germ layers: ectoderm, endoderm, and mesoderm. These germ layers generate each of the more than 220 cell types in the adult human body. When provided with the appropriate signals, ESCs initially form precursor cells that in subsequently differentiate into the desired cell types. Pluripotency distinguishes embryonic stem cells from adult stem cells, which are multipotent and can only produce a limited number of cell types.

=== Self renewal and repair of structure ===
Under defined conditions, embryonic stem cells are capable of self-renewing indefinitely in an undifferentiated state. Self-renewal conditions must prevent the cells from clumping and maintain an environment that supports an unspecialized state. Typically this is done in the lab with media containing serum and leukemia inhibitory factor or serum-free media supplements with two inhibitory drugs ("2i"), the MEK inhibitor PD03259010 and GSK-3 inhibitor CHIR99021.

=== Growth ===
ESCs divide very frequently due to a shortened G1 phase in their cell cycle. Rapid cell division allows the cells to quickly grow in number, but not size, which is important for early embryo development. In ESCs, cyclin A and cyclin E proteins involved in the G1/S transition are always expressed at high levels. Cyclin-dependent kinases such as CDK2 that promote cell cycle progression are overactive, in part due to downregulation of their inhibitors. Retinoblastoma proteins that inhibit the transcription factor E2F until the cell is ready to enter S phase are hyperphosphorylated and inactivated in ESCs, leading to continual expression of proliferation genes. These changes result in accelerated cycles of cell division. Although high expression levels of pro-proliferative proteins and a shortened G1 phase have been linked to maintenance of pluripotency, ESCs grown in serum-free 2i conditions do express hypo-phosphorylated active Retinoblastoma proteins and have an elongated G1 phase. Despite this difference in the cell cycle when compared to ESCs grown in media containing serum these cells have similar pluripotent characteristics. Pluripotency factors Oct4 and Nanog play a role in transcriptionally regulating the embryonic stem cell cycle.

=== Uses ===
Due to their plasticity and potentially unlimited capacity for self-renewal, embryonic stem cell therapies have been proposed for regenerative medicine and tissue replacement after injury or disease. Pluripotent stem cells have shown promise in treating a number of varying conditions, including but not limited to: spinal cord injuries, age related macular degeneration, diabetes, neurodegenerative disorders (such as Parkinson's disease), AIDS, etc. In addition to their potential in regenerative medicine, embryonic stem cells provide a possible alternative source of tissue/organs which serves as a possible solution to the donor shortage dilemma. However, there are ethical controversies surrounding this (see Ethical debate section below). Aside from these uses, ESCs can also be used for research on early human development, certain genetic disease, and in vitro toxicology testing.

== Utilizations ==
According to a 2002 article in PNAS, "Human embryonic stem cells have the potential to differentiate into various cell types, and, thus, may be useful as a source of cells for transplantation or tissue engineering."

=== Tissue engineering ===
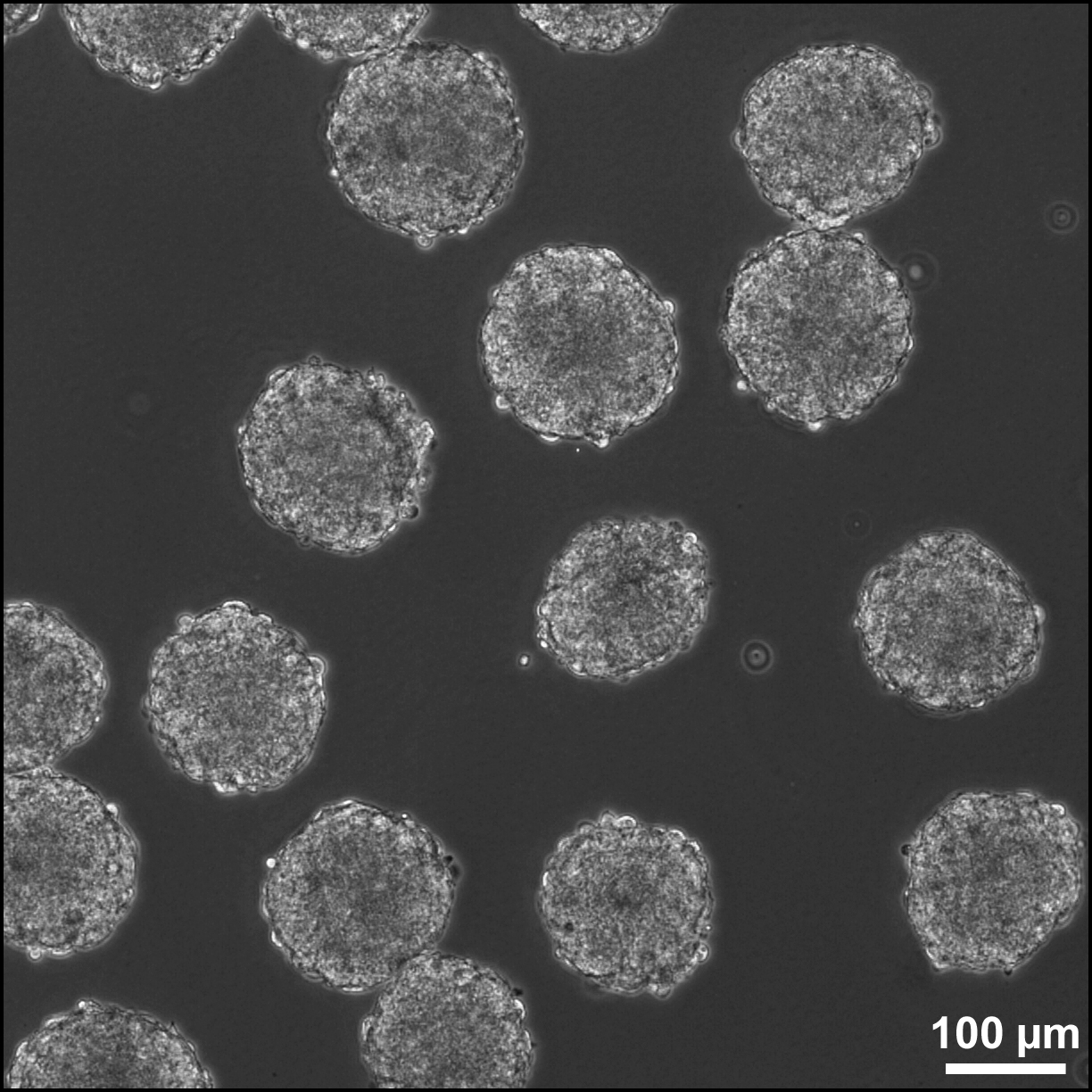
Embryoid bodies 24 hours after formation.

In tissue engineering, the use of stem cells are known to be of importance. In order to successfully engineer a tissue, the cells used must be able to perform specific biological functions such as secretion of cytokines, signaling molecules, interacting with neighboring cells, and producing an extracellular matrix in the correct organization. Stem cells demonstrates these specific biological functions along with being able to self-renew and differentiate into one or more types of specialized cells. Embryonic stem cells is one of the sources that are being considered for the use of tissue engineering. The use of human embryonic stem cells have opened many new possibilities for tissue engineering, however, there are many hurdles that must be made before human embryonic stem cell can even be utilized. It is theorized that if embryonic stem cells can be altered to not evoke the immune response when implanted into the patient then this would be a revolutionary step in tissue engineering. Embryonic stem cells are not limited to tissue engineering.

=== Cell replacement therapies ===
Research has focused on differentiating ESCs into a variety of cell types for eventual use as cell replacement therapies. Some of the cell types that have or are currently being developed include cardiomyocytes, neurons, hepatocytes, bone marrow cells, islet cells and endothelial cells. However, the derivation of such cell types from ESCs is not without obstacles, therefore research has focused on overcoming these barriers. For example, studies are underway to differentiate ESCs into tissue specific cardiomyocytes and to eradicate their immature properties that distinguish them from adult cardiomyocytes.

=== Clinical potential ===
- Researchers have differentiated ESCs into dopamine-producing cells with the hope that these neurons could be used in the treatment of Parkinson's disease.
- ESCs have been differentiated to natural killer cells and bone tissue.
- Studies involving ESCs are underway to provide an alternative treatment for diabetes. For example ESCs have been differentiated into insulin-producing cells, and researchers at Harvard University were able to produce large quantities of pancreatic beta cells from ESCs.
- An article published in the European Heart Journal describes a translational process of generating human embryonic stem cell-derived cardiac progenitor cells to be used in clinical trials of patients with severe heart failure.

=== Drug discovery ===
Besides becoming an important alternative to organ transplants, ESCs are also being used in the field of toxicology, and as cellular screens to uncover new chemical entities that can be developed as small-molecule drugs. Studies have shown that cardiomyocytes derived from ESCs are validated in vitro models to test drug responses and predict toxicity profiles. ESC derived cardiomyocytes have been shown to respond to pharmacological stimuli and hence can be used to assess cardiotoxicity such as torsades de pointes.

ESC-derived hepatocytes are also useful models that could be used in the preclinical stages of drug discovery. However, the development of hepatocytes from ESCs has proven to be challenging and this hinders the ability to test drug metabolism. Therefore, research has focused on establishing fully functional ESC-derived hepatocytes with stable phase I and II enzyme activity.

=== Models of genetic disorder ===
Several new studies have started to address the concept of modeling genetic disorders with embryonic stem cells. Either by genetically manipulating the cells, or more recently, by deriving diseased cell lines identified by prenatal genetic diagnosis (PGD), modeling genetic disorders is something that has been accomplished with stem cells. This approach may very well prove valuable at studying disorders such as Fragile-X syndrome, Cystic fibrosis, and other genetic maladies that have no reliable model system.

Yury Verlinsky, a Russian-American medical researcher who specialized in embryo and cellular genetics (genetic cytology), developed prenatal diagnosis testing methods to determine genetic and chromosomal disorders a month and a half earlier than standard amniocentesis. The techniques are now used by many pregnant women and prospective parents, especially couples who have a history of genetic abnormalities or where the woman is over the age of 35 (when the risk of genetically related disorders is higher). In addition, by allowing parents to select an embryo without genetic disorders, they have the potential of saving the lives of siblings that already had similar disorders and diseases using cells from the disease free offspring.

=== Repair of DNA damage ===
Differentiated somatic cells and ES cells use different strategies for dealing with DNA damage. For instance, human foreskin fibroblasts, one type of somatic cell, use non-homologous end joining (NHEJ), an error prone DNA repair process, as the primary pathway for repairing double-strand breaks (DSBs) during all cell cycle stages. Because of its error-prone nature, NHEJ tends to produce mutations in a cell's clonal descendants.

ES cells use a different strategy to deal with DSBs. Because ES cells give rise to all of the cell types of an organism including the cells of the germ line, mutations arising in ES cells due to faulty DNA repair are a more serious problem than in differentiated somatic cells. Consequently, robust mechanisms are needed in ES cells to repair DNA damages accurately, and if repair fails, to remove those cells with un-repaired DNA damages. Thus, mouse ES cells predominantly use high fidelity homologous recombinational repair (HRR) to repair DSBs. This type of repair depends on the interaction of the two sister chromosomes formed during S phase and present together during the G2 phase of the cell cycle. HRR can accurately repair DSBs in one sister chromosome by using intact information from the other sister chromosome. Cells in the G1 phase of the cell cycle (i.e. after metaphase/cell division but prior the next round of replication) have only one copy of each chromosome (i.e. sister chromosomes aren't present). Mouse ES cells lack a G1 checkpoint and do not undergo cell cycle arrest upon acquiring DNA damage. Rather they undergo programmed cell death (apoptosis) in response to DNA damage. Apoptosis can be used as a fail-safe strategy to remove cells with un-repaired DNA damages in order to avoid mutation and progression to cancer. Consistent with this strategy, mouse ES stem cells have a mutation frequency about 100-fold lower than that of isogenic mouse somatic cells.

=== Clinical trial ===
On January 23, 2009, Phase I clinical trials for transplantation of oligodendrocytes (a cell type of the brain and spinal cord) derived from human ESCs into spinal cord-injured individuals received approval from the U.S. Food and Drug Administration (FDA), marking it the world's first human ESC human trial. The study leading to this scientific advancement was conducted by Hans Keirstead and colleagues at the University of California, Irvine and supported by Geron Corporation of Menlo Park, CA, founded by Michael D. West, PhD. A previous experiment had shown an improvement in locomotor recovery in spinal cord-injured rats after a 7-day delayed transplantation of human ESCs that had been pushed into an oligodendrocytic lineage. The phase I clinical study was designed to enroll about eight to ten paraplegics who have had their injuries no longer than two weeks before the trial begins, since the cells must be injected before scar tissue is able to form. The researchers emphasized that the injections were not expected to fully cure the patients and restore all mobility. Based on the results of the rodent trials, researchers speculated that restoration of myelin sheathes and an increase in mobility might occur. This first trial was primarily designed to test the safety of these procedures and if everything went well, it was hoped that it would lead to future studies that involve people with more severe disabilities. The trial was put on hold in August 2009 due to FDA concerns regarding a small number of microscopic cysts found in several treated rat models but the hold was lifted on July 30, 2010.

In October 2010 researchers enrolled and administered ESCs to the first patient at Shepherd Center in Atlanta. The makers of the stem cell therapy, Geron Corporation, estimated that it would take several months for the stem cells to replicate and for the GRNOPC1 therapy to be evaluated for success or failure.

In November 2011 Geron announced it was halting the trial and dropping out of stem cell research for financial reasons, but would continue to monitor existing patients, and was attempting to find a partner that could continue their research. In 2013 BioTime, led by CEO Dr. Michael D. West, acquired all of Geron's stem cell assets, with the stated intention of restarting Geron's embryonic stem cell-based clinical trial for spinal cord injury research.

BioTime company Asterias Biotherapeutics (NYSE MKT: AST) was granted a $14.3 million Strategic Partnership Award by the California Institute for Regenerative Medicine (CIRM) to re-initiate the world's first embryonic stem cell-based human clinical trial, for spinal cord injury. Supported by California public funds, CIRM is the largest funder of stem cell-related research and development in the world.

The award provides funding for Asterias to reinitiate clinical development of AST-OPC1 in subjects with spinal cord injury and to expand clinical testing of escalating doses in the target population intended for future pivotal trials.

AST-OPC1 is a population of cells derived from human embryonic stem cells (hESCs) that contains oligodendrocyte progenitor cells (OPCs). OPCs and their mature derivatives called oligodendrocytes provide critical functional support for nerve cells in the spinal cord and brain. Asterias recently presented the results from phase 1 clinical trial testing of a low dose of AST-OPC1 in patients with neurologically complete thoracic spinal cord injury. The results showed that AST-OPC1 was successfully delivered to the injured spinal cord site. Patients followed 2–3 years after AST-OPC1 administration showed no evidence of serious adverse events associated with the cells in detailed follow-up assessments including frequent neurological exams and MRIs. Immune monitoring of subjects through one year post-transplantation showed no evidence of antibody-based or cellular immune responses to AST-OPC1. In four of the five subjects, serial MRI scans performed throughout the 2–3 year follow-up period indicate that reduced spinal cord cavitation may have occurred and that AST-OPC1 may have had some positive effects in reducing spinal cord tissue deterioration. There was no unexpected neurological degeneration or improvement in the five subjects in the trial as evaluated by the International Standards for Neurological Classification of Spinal Cord Injury (ISNCSCI) exam.

The Strategic Partnership III grant from CIRM will provide funding to Asterias to support the next clinical trial of AST-OPC1 in subjects with spinal cord injury, and for Asterias' product development efforts to refine and scale manufacturing methods to support later-stage trials and eventually commercialization. CIRM funding will be conditional on FDA approval for the trial, completion of a definitive agreement between Asterias and CIRM, and Asterias' continued progress toward the achievement of certain pre-defined project milestones.

== Concern and controversy ==
=== Adverse effects ===
The major concern with the possible transplantation of ESCs into patients as therapies is their ability to form tumors including teratomas. Safety issues prompted the FDA to place a hold on the first ESC clinical trial, however no tumors were observed.

The main strategy to enhance the safety of ESCs for potential clinical use is to differentiate the ESCs into specific cell types (e.g. neurons, muscle, liver cells) that have reduced or eliminated ability to cause tumors. Following differentiation, the cells are subjected to sorting by flow cytometry for further purification. ESCs are predicted to be inherently safer than iPS cells created with genetically integrating viral vectors because they are not genetically modified with genes such as c-Myc that are linked to cancer. Nonetheless, ESCs express very high levels of the iPS inducing genes and these genes including Myc are essential for ESC self-renewal and pluripotency, and potential strategies to improve safety by eliminating c-Myc expression are unlikely to preserve the cells' "stemness". However, N-myc and L-myc have been identified to induce iPS cells instead of c-myc with similar efficiency. Later protocols to induce pluripotency bypass these problems completely by using non-integrating RNA viral vectors such as sendai virus or mRNA transfection.

=== Ethical debate ===
Due to the nature of embryonic stem cell research, there are a lot of controversial opinions on the topic. Since harvesting embryonic stem cells usually necessitates destroying the embryo from which those cells are obtained, the moral status of the embryo comes into question. Some people claim that the embryo is too young to achieve personhood or that the embryo, if donated from an IVF clinic (where labs typically acquire embryos), would otherwise go to medical waste anyway. Opponents of ESC research claim that an embryo is a human life, therefore destroying it is murder and the embryo must be protected under the same ethical view as a more developed human being.

== History ==
- 1964: Lewis Kleinsmith and G. Barry Pierce Jr. isolated a single type of cell from a teratocarcinoma, a tumor now known from a germ cell. These cells were isolated from the teratocarcinoma replicated and grew in cell culture as a stem cell and are now known as embryonal carcinoma (EC) cells. Although similarities in morphology and differentiating potential (pluripotency) led to the use of EC cells as the in vitro model for early mouse development, EC cells harbor genetic mutations and often abnormal karyotypes that accumulated during the development of the teratocarcinoma. These genetic aberrations further emphasized the need to be able to culture pluripotent cells directly from the inner cell mass.

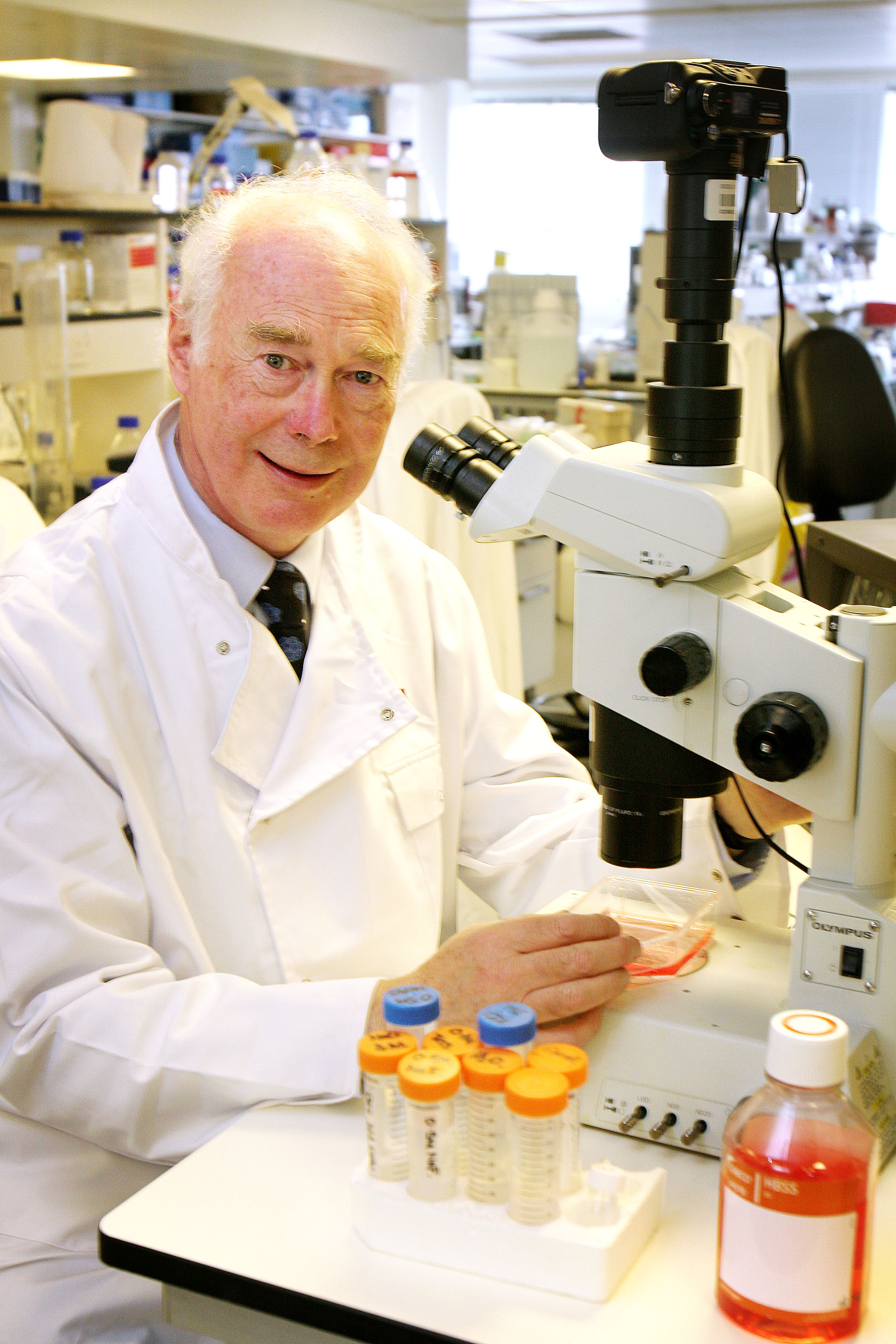
Martin Evans revealed a new technique for culturing the mouse embryos in the uterus to allow for the derivation of ES cells from these embryos.

- 1981: Embryonic stem cells (ES cells) were independently first derived from a mouse embryos by two groups. Martin Evans and Matthew Kaufman from the Department of Genetics, University of Cambridge published first in July, revealing a new technique for culturing the mouse embryos in the uterus to allow for an increase in cell number, allowing for the derivation of ES cell from these embryos. Gail R. Martin, from the Department of Anatomy, University of California, San Francisco, published her paper in December and coined the term "Embryonic Stem Cell". She showed that embryos could be cultured in vitro and that ES cells could be derived from these embryos.
- 1989: Mario R. Cappechi, Martin J. Evans, and Oliver Smithies publish their research that details their isolation and genetic modifications of embryonic stem cells, creating the first "knockout mice". In creating knockout mice, this publication provided scientists with an entirely new way to study disease.
- Dolly the sheep cell differentiation
  1996: Dolly, was the first mammal cloned from an adult cell by the Roslin Institute of the University of Edinburgh. This experiment instituted the proposition that specialized adult cells obtain the genetic makeup to perform a specific task; which established a basis for further research within a variety of cloning techniques. The Dolly experiment was performed by obtaining the mammalian udder cells from a sheep (Dolly) and differentiating these cells until division was concluded. An egg cell was then procured from a different sheep host and the nucleus was removed. An udder cell was placed next to the egg cell and connected by electricity causing this cell to share DNA. This egg cell differentiated into an embryo and the embryo was inserted into a third sheep which gave birth to the clone version of Dolly.
- 1998: A team from the University of Wisconsin, Madison (James A. Thomson, Joseph Itskovitz-Eldor, Sander S. Shapiro, Michelle A. Waknitz, Jennifer J. Swiergiel, Vivienne S. Marshall, and Jeffrey M. Jones) publish a paper titled "Embryonic Stem Cell Lines Derived From Human Blastocysts". The researchers behind this study not only created the first embryonic stem cells, but recognized their pluripotency, as well as their capacity for self-renewal. The abstract of the paper notes the significance of the discovery with regards to the fields of developmental biology and drug discovery.
- 2001: President George W. Bush allows federal funding to support research on roughly 60—at this time, already existing—lines of embryonic stem cells. Seeing as the limited lines that Bush allowed research on had already been established, this law supported embryonic stem cell research without raising any ethical questions that could arise with the creation of new lines under federal budget.
- 2006: Japanese scientists Shinya Yamanaka and Kazutoshi Takashi publish a paper describing the induction of pluripotent stem cells from cultures of adult mouse fibroblasts. Induced pluripotent stem cells (iPSCs) are a huge discovery, as they are seemingly identical to embryonic stem cells and could be used without sparking the same moral controversy.
- January, 2009: The US Food and Drug Administration (FDA) provides approval for Geron Corporation's phase I trial of their human embryonic stem cell-derived treatment for spinal cord injuries. The announcement was met with excitement from the scientific community, but also with wariness from stem cell opposers. The treatment cells were, however, derived from the cell lines approved under George W. Bush's ESC policy.
- March, 2009: Executive Order 13505 is signed by President Barack Obama, removing the restrictions put in place on federal funding for human stem cells by the previous presidential administration. This would allow the National Institutes of Health (NIH) to provide funding for hESC research. The document also states that the NIH must provide revised federal funding guidelines within 120 days of the order's signing.

== Techniques and conditions for derivation and culture ==
=== Derivation from humans ===
In vitro fertilization generates multiple embryos. The surplus of embryos is not clinically used or is unsuitable for implantation into the patient, and therefore may be donated by the donor with consent. Human embryonic stem cells can be derived from these donated embryos or additionally they can also be extracted from cloned embryos created using a cell from a patient and a donated egg through the process of somatic cell nuclear transfer. The inner cell mass (cells of interest), from the blastocyst stage of the embryo, is separated from the trophectoderm, the cells that would differentiate into extra-embryonic tissue. Immunosurgery, the process in which antibodies are bound to the trophectoderm and removed by another solution, and mechanical dissection are performed to achieve separation. The resulting inner cell mass cells are plated onto cells that will supply support. The inner cell mass cells attach and expand further to form a human embryonic cell line, which are undifferentiated. These cells are fed daily and are enzymatically or mechanically separated every four to seven days. For differentiation to occur, the human embryonic stem cell line is removed from the supporting cells to form embryoid bodies, is co-cultured with a serum containing necessary signals, or is grafted in a three-dimensional scaffold to result.

=== Derivation from other animals ===
Embryonic stem cells are derived from the inner cell mass of the early embryo, which are harvested from the donor mother animal. Martin Evans and Matthew Kaufman reported a technique that delays embryo implantation, allowing the inner cell mass to increase. This process includes removing the donor mother's ovaries and dosing her with progesterone, changing the hormone environment, which causes the embryos to remain free in the uterus. After 4–6 days of this intrauterine culture, the embryos are harvested and grown in in vitro culture until the inner cell mass forms "egg cylinder-like structures," which are dissociated into single cells, and plated on fibroblasts treated with mitomycin-c (to prevent fibroblast mitosis). Clonal cell lines are created by growing up a single cell. Evans and Kaufman showed that the cells grown out from these cultures could form teratomas and embryoid bodies, and differentiate in vitro, all of which indicating that the cells are pluripotent.

Gail Martin derived and cultured her ES cells differently. She removed the embryos from the donor mother at approximately 76 hours after copulation and cultured them overnight in a medium containing serum. The following day, she removed the inner cell mass from the late blastocyst using microsurgery. The extracted inner cell mass was cultured on fibroblasts treated with mitomycin-c in a medium containing serum and conditioned by ES cells. After approximately one week, colonies of cells grew out. These cells grew in culture and demonstrated pluripotent characteristics, as demonstrated by the ability to form teratomas, differentiate in vitro, and form embryoid bodies. Martin referred to these cells as ES cells.

It is now known that the feeder cells provide leukemia inhibitory factor (LIF) and serum provides bone morphogenetic proteins (BMPs) that are necessary to prevent ES cells from differentiating. These factors are extremely important for the efficiency of deriving ES cells. Furthermore, it has been demonstrated that different mouse strains have different efficiencies for isolating ES cells. Current uses for mouse ES cells include the generation of transgenic mice, including knockout mice. For human treatment, there is a need for patient specific pluripotent cells. Generation of human ES cells is more difficult and faces ethical issues. So, in addition to human ES cell research, many groups are focused on the generation of induced pluripotent stem cells (iPS cells).

=== Potential methods for new cell line derivation ===
On August 23, 2006, the online edition of Nature scientific journal published a letter by Dr. Robert Lanza (medical director of Advanced Cell Technology in Worcester, MA) stating that his team had found a way to extract embryonic stem cells without destroying the actual embryo. This technical achievement would potentially enable scientists to work with new lines of embryonic stem cells derived using public funding in the US, where federal funding was at the time limited to research using embryonic stem cell lines derived prior to August 2001. In March, 2009, the limitation was lifted.

Human embryonic stem cells have also been derived by somatic cell nuclear transfer (SCNT). This approach has also sometimes been referred to as "therapeutic cloning" because SCNT bears similarity to other kinds of cloning in that nuclei are transferred from a somatic cell into an enucleated zygote. However, in this case SCNT was used to produce embryonic stem cell lines in a lab, not living organisms via a pregnancy. The "therapeutic" part of the name is included because of the hope that SCNT produced embryonic stem cells could have clinical utility.

=== Induced pluripotent stem cells ===
The iPS cell technology was pioneered by Shinya Yamanaka's lab in Kyoto, Japan, who showed in 2006 that the introduction of four specific genes encoding transcription factors could convert adult cells into pluripotent stem cells. He was awarded the 2012 Nobel Prize along with Sir John Gurdon "for the discovery that mature cells can be reprogrammed to become pluripotent."

In 2007, it was shown that pluripotent stem cells, highly similar to embryonic stem cells, can be induced by the delivery of four factors (Oct3/4, Sox2, c-Myc, and Klf4) to differentiated cells. Utilizing the four genes previously listed, the differentiated cells are "reprogrammed" into pluripotent stem cells, allowing for the generation of pluripotent/embryonic stem cells without the embryo. The morphology and growth factors of these lab induced pluripotent cells, are equivalent to embryonic stem cells, leading these cells to be known as induced pluripotent stem cells (iPS cells). This observation was observed in mouse pluripotent stem cells, originally, but now can be performed in human adult fibroblasts using the same four genes.

Because ethical concerns regarding embryonic stem cells typically are about their derivation from terminated embryos, it is believed that reprogramming to these iPS cells may be less controversial.

This may enable the generation of patient specific ES cell lines that could potentially be used for cell replacement therapies. In addition, this will allow the generation of ES cell lines from patients with a variety of genetic diseases and will provide invaluable models to study those diseases.

However, as a first indication that the iPS cell technology can in rapid succession lead to new cures, it was used by a research team headed by Rudolf Jaenisch of the Whitehead Institute for Biomedical Research in Cambridge, Massachusetts, to cure mice of sickle cell anemia, as reported by Science journal's online edition on December 6, 2007.

On January 16, 2008, a California-based company, Stemagen, announced that they had created the first mature cloned human embryos from single skin cells taken from adults. These embryos can be harvested for patient matching embryonic stem cells.

=== Contamination by reagents used in cell culture ===
The online edition of Nature Medicine published a study on January 24, 2005, which stated that the human embryonic stem cells available for federally funded research are contaminated with non-human molecules from the culture medium used to grow the cells. It is a common technique to use mouse cells and other animal cells to maintain the pluripotency of actively dividing stem cells. The problem was discovered when non-human sialic acid in the growth medium was found to compromise the potential uses of the embryonic stem cells in humans, according to scientists at the University of California, San Diego.

However, a study published in the online edition of Lancet Medical Journal on March 8, 2005, detailed information about a new stem cell line that was derived from human embryos under completely cell- and serum-free conditions. After more than 6 months of undifferentiated proliferation, these cells demonstrated the potential to form derivatives of all three embryonic germ layers both in vitro and in teratomas. These properties were also successfully maintained (for more than 30 passages) with the established stem cell lines.

=== Muse cells ===
Muse cells (Multi-lineage differentiating stress enduring cell) are non-cancerous pluripotent stem cell found in adults. They were discovered in 2010 by Mari Dezawa and her research group. Muse cells reside in the connective tissue of nearly every organ including the umbilical cord, bone marrow and peripheral blood. They are collectable from commercially obtainable mesenchymal cells such as human fibroblasts, bone marrow-mesenchymal stem cells and adipose-derived stem cells. Muse cells are able to generate cells representative of all three germ layers from a single cell both spontaneously and under cytokine induction. Expression of pluripotency genes and triploblastic differentiation are self-renewable over generations. Muse cells do not undergo teratoma formation when transplanted into a host environment in vivo, eradicating the risk of tumorigenesis through unbridled cell proliferation.

== See also ==
- Embryoid body
- Embryonic Stem Cell Research Oversight Committees
- Fetal tissue implant
- Induced stem cells
- KOSR (KnockOut Serum Replacement)
- Stem cell controversy
