= Immunosurgery =

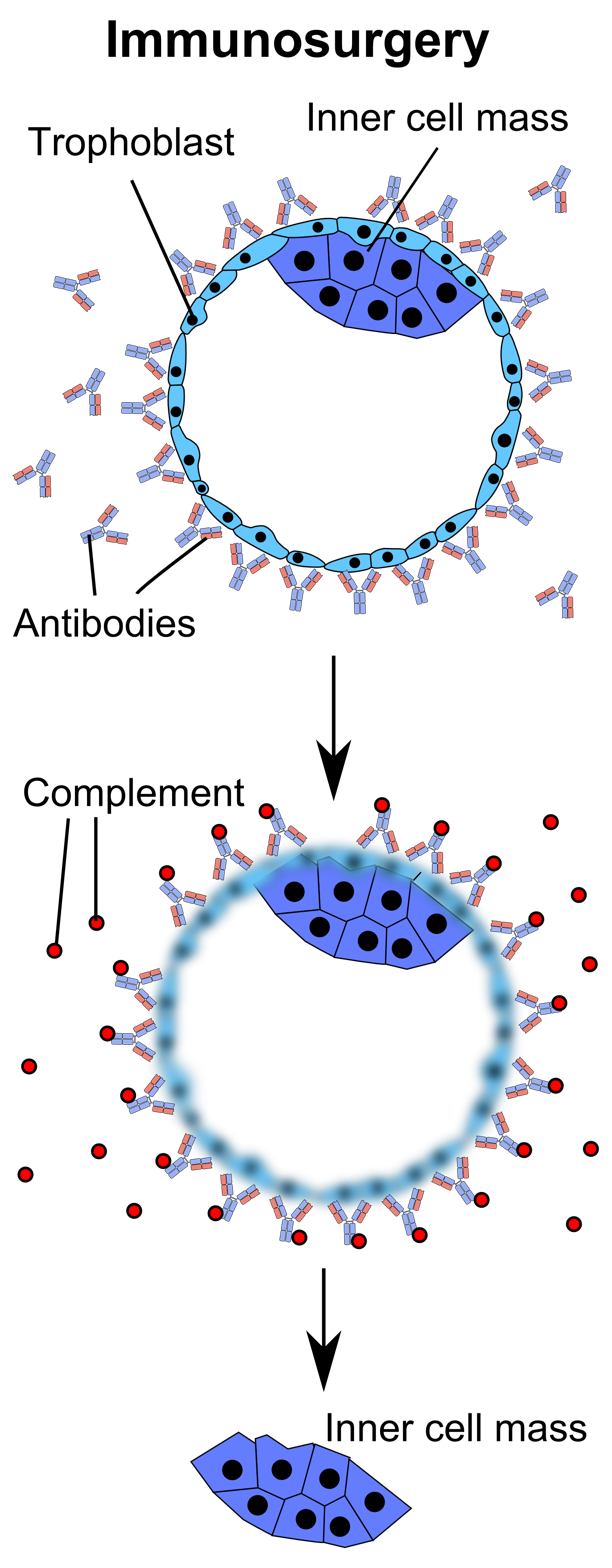
Immunosurgery of a blastocyst. Antibodies are added that attach to the outermost layer of cells, which on a blastocyst is the trophoblast. After removing any unbound antibodies and adding complement, the trophoblast cells are destroyed, leaving only the inner cell mass.

Immunosurgery is a method of selectively removing the external cell layer (trophoblast) of a blastocyst through a cytotoxicity procedure. The protocol for immunosurgery includes preincubation with an antiserum, rinsing it with embryonic stem cell derivation media to remove the antibodies, exposing it to complement, and then removing the lysed trophoectoderm through a pipette. This technique is used to isolate the inner cell mass of the blastocyst. The trophoectoderm's cell junctions and tight epithelium "shield" the ICM from antibody binding by effectively making the cell impermeable to macromolecules.

Immunosurgery can be used to obtain large quantities of pure inner cell masses in a relatively short period of time. The ICM obtained can then be used for stem cell research and is better to use than adult or fetal stem cells because the ICM has not been affected by external factors, such as manually bisecting the cell. However, if the structural integrity of the blastocyst is compromised prior to the experiment, the ICM is susceptible to the immunological reaction. Thus, the quality of the embryo used is imperative to the experiment's success. In addition, when using complement derived from animals, the source of the animals matters. They should be kept in a specific-pathogen-free environment to increase the likelihood that the animal has not developed natural antibodies against the bacterial carbohydrates present in the serum (which can be obtained from a different animal).

Solter and Knowles developed the first method of immunosurgery with their 1975 paper "Immunosurgery of Mouse Blastocyst". They primarily used it for studying early embryonic development. Though immunosurgery is the most prevalent method of ICM isolation, various experiments have improved the process, such as through the use of lasers (performed by Tanaka, et al.) and micromanipulators (performed by Ding, et al.). These new methods reduce the risk of contamination with animal materials within the embryonic stem cells derived from the ICM, which can cause complications later on if the embryonic stem cells are transplanted into a human for cell therapy.
