= Jeffrey M. Friedman =

American geneticist (born 1954)

Jeffrey Friedman
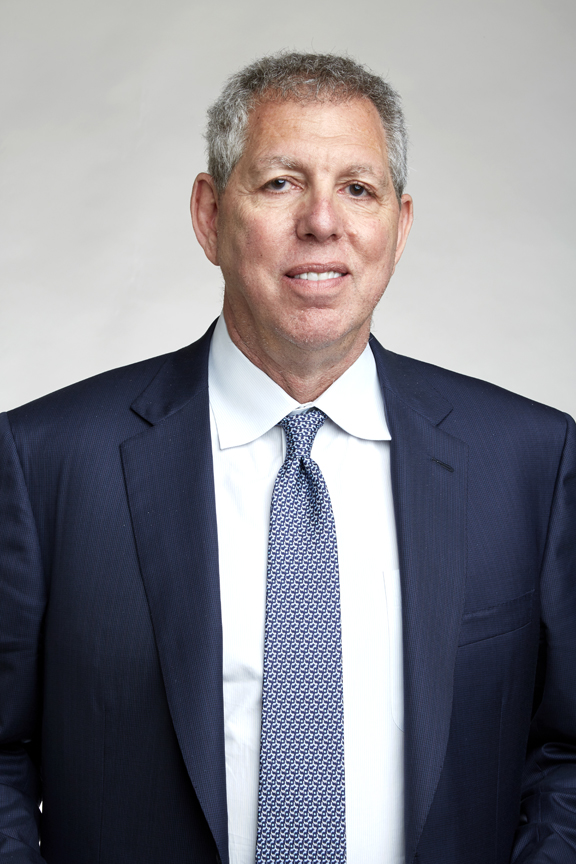
- Jeffrey Friedman at the Royal Society admissions day in London, July 2018
- Born: July 20, 1954 (age 72); Orlando, Florida, US
- Education: Rockefeller University (PhD)
- Known for: discovery of the hormone leptin and its role in regulating body weight
- Awards: Shaw Prize (2009); Albert Lasker Award for Basic Medical Research (2010); BBVA Foundation Frontiers of Knowledge Award (2012); Foreign Member of the Royal Society (2018); Wolf Prize in Medicine (2019); Breakthrough Prize in Life Sciences (2020); Albany Medical Center Prize (2025)
- Scientific career
- Fields: Molecular genetics
- Workplaces: Rockefeller University
- Thesis: Regulation of liver gene expression (1986)
- Website: www.rockefeller.edu/our-scientists/heads-of-laboratories/1163-jeffrey-m-friedman/

Jeffrey M. Friedman (born July 20, 1954) is a molecular geneticist at New York City's Rockefeller University and an Investigator of the Howard Hughes Medical Institute. His discovery of the hormone leptin and its role in regulating body weight has had a major role in the area of human obesity. Friedman is a physician scientist studying the genetic mechanisms that regulate body weight.

== Education ==
Friedman was born in Orlando, Florida on July 20, 1954, and grew up in North Woodmere, New York, graduating from Hewlett High School in the Class of 1971. As a young man he aspired to becoming a physician. He entered a six-year medical program out of high school and received his M.D. at the age of 22. But after a year-long fellowship working in the laboratory of Mary Jeanne Kreek, he fell in love with the science life. "As a doctor, you're trained to absorb the facts you're given and accept them," says Friedman. "Science is almost the opposite. It's a frontier of discovery that's always moving. And I decided I wanted to do research." Friedman started his affiliation with the Rockefeller University in 1980, where he was awarded a Ph.D. degree in 1986. Friedman received a BS from Rensselaer Polytechnic Institute in 1973 and M.D. degree from Albany Medical College in 1977 and completed a medical residency at Albany Medical College in 1980. From 1980 to 1981, he also served as a postgraduate fellow at Cornell University Medical College.

== Career and research ==
Friedman was appointed Assistant Investigator with the Howard Hughes Medical Institute at The Rockefeller University in 1986, promoted to Associate Investigator in 1991, and Investigator in 1996 and received the Marilyn M. Simpson professorship in 1998.

Friedman has published over one hundred and fifty publications and over ten book chapters.

He is also involved in the research related to the 1st inbred rat model of obesity and aging, also known as WNIN/Ob obese rats developed in National Institute of Nutrition, Hyderabad, India.

=== Awards and honors ===
Friedman's work in the area of obesity and the leptin gene has led to Friedman receiving many prestigious awards:

- 1994 and 1996 Time Magazines's Best of Science section
- 1995 Popular Science's Best of Science Award
- 1996 Heinrich Wieland Prize
- 1997 Jacobaeus Prize
- 1999 Steven C. Beering Award
- 2000 Endocrinology Transatlantic Medal
- 2000 Rolf Luft Award, Karolinska Hospital
- 2001 Elected to the National Academy of Sciences
- 2001 Bristol-Myers Squibb Award for Distinguished Achievement in Metabolic Research
- 2005 Passano Award
- 2005 Elected to The Royal Swedish Academy of Sciences, Foreign Member
- 2005 Canada Gairdner International Award
- 2007 Jessie Stevenson Kovalenko Medal
- 2007 Danone International Prize
- 2009 Keio Medical Science Prize
- 2009 Shaw Prize for Life Sciences and Medicine
- 2009 Hamdan Award for Medical Research Excellence
- 2010 Thomson Reuters Citation Laureate
- 2010 Robert J. and Claire Passano Foundation Award
- 2010 Albert Lasker Basic Medical Research Award
- 2012 The Foundation IPSEN 11th Endocrine Regulation Prize
- 2012 UCL Prize Lecture in Clinical Science
- 2012 BBVA Foundation Frontiers of Knowledge Award in Biomedicine (co-winner with Douglas Coleman)
- 2013 King Faisal International Prize in Medicine
- 2013 Elected to the American Academy of Arts and Sciences
- 2019 Wolf Prize in Medicine
- 2020 Breakthrough Prize in Life Sciences
- 2024 Princess of Asturias Awards for Technical and Scientific Research.
- 2025 Albany Medical Center Prize

His work on leptin also garnered him much television time, including an appearance on the PBS show Scientific American Frontiers in a long interview with host Alan Alda.

== Personal life ==
Friedman lives in New York City with his wife, Lily Safani, and his twin daughters, Alexandra and Nathalie.
