= UCL Prize Lecture in Life and Medical Sciences =

The UCL Prize Lecture in Life and Medical Sciences (previously UCL Prize Lecture in Clinical Science) is a prize awarded annually by University College London since 1997. The prize lecture has become the pre-eminent series on contemporary science in Europe and the annual lecture provides an opportunity to debate and celebrate important scientific advancements.

== Recipients ==
- 1997 Klaus Rajewsky
- 1998 Joseph L. Goldstein (Nobel Prize in Medicine 1985)
- 1999 Stanley B. Prusiner (Nobel Prize in Medicine 1997)
- 2000 James Watson (Nobel Prize in Medicine 1962)
- 2001 Judah Folkman
- 2002 J. Craig Venter
- 2003 Sydney Brenner (Nobel Prize in Medicine 2002)
- 2004 Robert Weinberg (Woolf Prize 2004)
- 2005 Richard Axel (Nobel Prize in Medicine 2004)
- 2006 Harold Varmus (Nobel Prize in Medicine 1989)
- 2007 Tadataka Yamada
- 2008 Susumu Tonegawa (Nobel Prize in Physiology or Medicine 1987)
- 2009 Martin Evans (Nobel Prize Physiology or Medicine 2007)
- 2010 Barry Marshall (Nobel Prize in Medicine 2005)
- 2011 Roger Tsien (Nobel Prize in Chemistry 2008)
- 2012 Jeffrey Friedman (Albert Lasker Award 2010)
- 2013 Gary Ruvkun (Louisa Gross Horwitz Prize 2009)
- 2014 Anthony W. Segal
- 2015 Sir John Gurdon (Nobel Prize in Physiology or Medicine 2012)
- 2016 Françoise Barré-Sinoussi (Nobel Prize in Physiology or Medicine 2008)
- 2017 Patrick Vallance
- 2018 James P. Allison (Nobel Prize in Physiology or Medicine 2018)
- 2019 Jennifer Doudna (Nobel Prize in Chemistry 2020)
- 2020 Ann Graybiel
- 2022 Carla J. Shatz
- 2023 Demis Hassabis (Nobel Prize in Chemistry 2024)
- 2024 Sarah Gilbert
- 2025 Ardem Patapoutian (Nobel Prize in Physiology or Medicine 2021)

== See also ==
- List of medicine awards
- List of prizes named after people
