= Embryonic Stem Cell Research Oversight Committees =

The National Academies called for the establishment of Embryonic Stem Cell Research Oversight (ESCRO) Committees in its 2005 Guidelines for Human Embryonic Stem Cell Research to manage the ethical and legal concerns in human embryonic stem cell research. Because of the complexity and novelty of many of the issues involved in that research, the Guidelines committee believes that all research institutions engaged in human embryonic stem cell research should create and maintain these committees at the local level.

The composition and responsibilities of ESCRO committees was further clarified in the Amendments to the National Academies' Guidelines for Human Embryonic Stem Cell Research, released in February 2007.

== Organization ==
The United States of America's National Academies' Guidelines make clear that activities related to human embryonic stem cell research should be overseen by an ESCRO committee. Those committees could be internal to a single institution or established jointly with one or more other institutions. Alternatively, an institution may have its proposals reviewed by an ESCRO committee of another institution or by an independent ESCRO committee. Many of these changes are discussed in the 2007 Amendments.

== Composition ==
The composition of ESCRO committees was specified to include representatives of the public and people with expertise in developmental biology, stem cell research, molecular biology, assisted reproduction, and ethical and legal issues in human embryonic stem cell research.

The 2007 Amendments clarified that public representations should be independent and lay and in addition to the listed areas of scientific expertise.

Although ESCRO committees may overlap with other oversight committees, it should not be a subcommittee of an Institutional Review Board, as its responsibilities extend beyond human subject protections.

== Responsibilities ==
The Guidelines assigns several responsibilities to ESCRO committees:

- provide oversight over all issues related to derivation and use of hES cell lines
- review and approve the scientific merit of research protocols
- review compliance of all in-house human embryonic stem cell research with all relevant regulations and these guidelines
- maintain registries of human embryonic stem cell research conducted at the institution and hES cell lines derived or imported by institutional investigators
- facilitate education of investigators involved in human embryonic stem cell research.

== References and resources ==
=== Advice for ESCRO committees ===
- Hanna, K.E. (2007). Ball of confusion: How stem cells have stymied review boards. Research Practitioner 8(4): 128-136.
- O'Rourke, P.P., M. Abelman, and K.G. Heffernan. (2007). Establishing institutional oversight for human embryonic stem cell research: Creating an ESCRO Committee. Medical Research Law & Policy Report 6(15): 416-423.
- Zettler, P., L.E. Wolf, and B. Lo. (2007). Establishing procedures for institutional oversight of stem cell research. Academic Medicine 82: 6-10.
