= Matthew Kaufman =

English geneticist (1942–2013)

- Born: 29 September 1942; London, England
- Died: 11 August 2013 (aged 70); Edinburgh, Scotland
- Education: the University of Edinburgh
- Known for: Discovering embryonic stem cells, and author of the Atlas of Mouse Development.
- Scientific career
- Fields: Developmental biology
- Workplaces: University of Edinburgh

Matthew H. Kaufman (29 September 1942 – 11 August 2013) was a British biologist. He was Professor Emeritus at University of Edinburgh having been Professor of Anatomy there from 1985 to 2007. He taught anatomy and embryology for more than 30 years, initially at the University of Cambridge, when he was a Fellow of King's College, and more recently (from 1985 to 1997) in Edinburgh.

Born in London into an Orthodox Jewish family, during his early years at the University of Edinburgh, he re-instituted a course for an intercalated degree (an honours science degree taken within a medical degree course) in anatomy, absent for many years in this subject. With this he brought a new life of exploration and research within the department of anatomy.

In 1981, Kaufman and Martin Evans at the University of Cambridge in England and Gail R. Martin in America were the first to derive embryonic stem cells (ES cells) from mouse embryos. He obtained a PhD in 1984 from the University of Edinburgh presenting the thesis 'Investigations into the genetic, morphogenetic and teratogenic factors that influence early mammalian development'. He published four books on mouse embryology and three books on historical aspects of military surgery. He also published a book on Medical Teaching in Edinburgh during the 18th and 19th centuries, a book on the History of the Edinburgh Phrenological Society and biographies of Dr. John Barclay and Mr. Robert Liston. He also published about 240 papers on a wide range of embryological and medical historical topics. He was awarded the F.R.S. Edin. in 2008.

He was a leading authority on mouse development.

He was also Honorary Librarian at the Royal Medical Society in Edinburgh, having been Senior President from 1966 to 1967. He died after a long illness at an Edinburgh nursing home in 2013.

== Publications ==
- Kaufman, M.H. (1983). Early Mammalian Development: Parthenogenetic Studies. Cambridge: Cambridge University Press. [276 pp.] ISBN 0-521-25449-3.
- Kaufman, M.H. (1992). The Atlas of Mouse Development. London: Academic Press. [512 pp.] ISBN 0-12-402035-6.
- Kaufman, M.H. (1994). The Atlas of Mouse Development. Second Printing, with Index. London: Academic Press. [525pp.] ISBN 0-12-402035-6 (numerous subsequent editions).
- Kaufman, M.H. & Bard, J.B.L. (1999). The Anatomical Basis of Mouse Development. San Diego: Academic Press. [291 pp.] ISBN 0-12-402060-7.
- Kaufman, M.H. (2001). Surgeons at War: Medical Arrangements for the Treatment of the Sick and Wounded in the British Army during the late 18th and 19th Centuries. Westport C.T.: Greenwood Publishing Group Inc. [227 pp.] ISBN 0-313-31665-1.
- Kaufman, M.H. (2003). The Regius Chair of Military Surgery in the University of Edinburgh – 1806–55. Amsterdam & New York: Wellcome Trust. Rodopi B.V. [361 pp.] ISBN 90-420-1238-2
- Kaufman, M., Nikitin, A.Y. & Sundberg, J.P. (2009). Histologic Basis of Mouse Endocrine System Development: A Comparative Analysis. Boca Raton, London, New York: CRC Press, Taylor & Francis Group [232 pp.] ISBN 978-1-4200-8818-2

== Privately published books ==
All of these books are available from the Shop of the Royal College of Surgeons of Edinburgh:

- Kaufman, M.H. (2003). Musket-ball and Sabre Injuries from the First Half of the Nineteenth Century. Edinburgh: Royal College of Surgeons of Edinburgh [255 pp.] ISBN 0-9503620-7-7 [Only available from Shop of Royal College of Surgeons of Edinburgh]
- Kaufman, M.H. (2003). Medical Teaching in Edinburgh during the 18th and 19th centuries. Edinburgh: Royal College of Surgeons of Edinburgh [208 pp.] ISBN 0-9503620-8-5
- Kaufman, M.H. (2005). Edinburgh Phrenological Society: A History. Edinburgh: William Ramsay Henderson Trust. [236 pp.] ISBN 0-9550906-0-1
- Kaufman, M.H. (2007). Dr John Barclay (1758–1826): Extramural teacher of Human and Comparative Anatomy in Edinburgh. Edinburgh: Royal College of Surgeons of Edinburgh. [175 pp.] ISBN 978-0-9546213-4-6
- Kaufman, M.H. (2009). Robert Liston Surgery's Hero. Edinburgh: Royal College of Surgeons of Edinburgh. [234 pp.] ISBN 978-0-9546213-7-7
