= Martin Evans =

British biologist

Sir Martin Evans FRS FMedSci FLSW
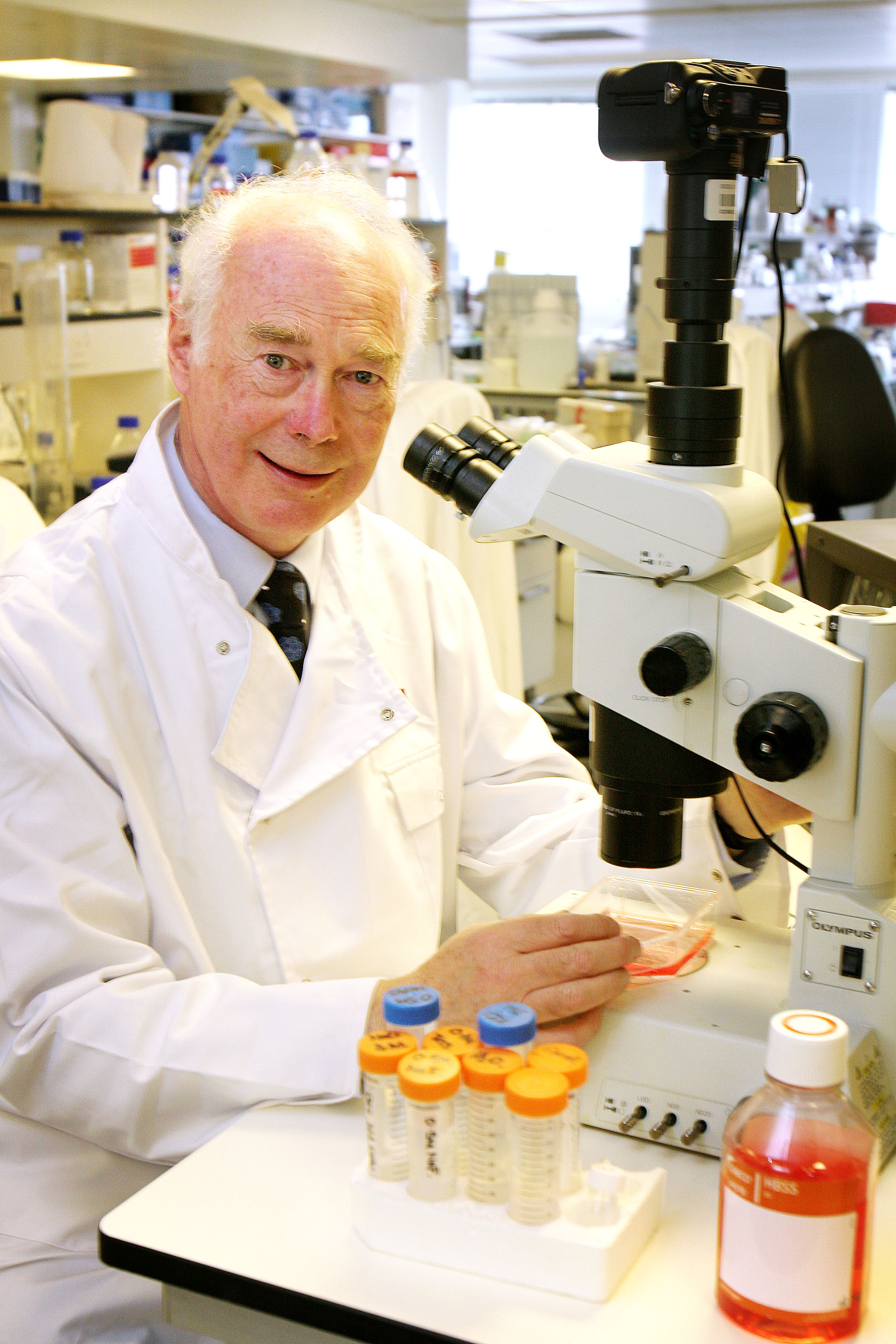
- Evans in October 2007
- Born: Martin John Evans; 1 January 1941 (age 85); Stroud, Gloucestershire, England
- Education: University of Cambridge (BA); University College London (PhD)
- Known for: Discovering embryonic stem cells, and development of the knockout mouse and gene targeting.
- Spouse: Judith Clare Williams MBE (m. 1966)
- Children: Two sons and one daughter
- Awards: William Bate Hardy Prize (1993); Lasker Award (2001); Knight Bachelor (2004); Nobel Prize in Physiology or Medicine (2007)
- Scientific career
- Fields: Developmental biology
- Workplaces: University College London; University of Cambridge; Cardiff University
- Thesis: Studies on the ribonucleic acid of early amphibian embryos
- Doctoral students: Allan Bradley; Elizabeth Robertson
- Martin Evans's voice from the BBC programme Desert Island Discs, 17 February 2008
- Website: cardiff.ac.uk/martinevans

Sir Martin John Evans FRS FMedSci FLSW (born 1 January 1941) is an English biologist who, with Matthew Kaufman, was the first to culture mice embryonic stem cells and cultivate them in a laboratory in 1981. He is also known, along with Mario Capecchi and Oliver Smithies, for his work in the development of the knockout mouse and the related technology of gene targeting, a method of using embryonic stem cells to create specific gene modifications in mice. In 2007, the three shared the Nobel Prize in Physiology or Medicine in recognition of their discovery and contribution to the efforts to develop new treatments for illnesses in humans.

He won a major scholarship to Christ's College, Cambridge at a time when advances in genetics were occurring there and became interested in biology and biochemistry. He then went to University College London where he learned laboratory skills supervised by Elizabeth Deuchar. In 1978, he moved to the Department of Genetics, at the University of Cambridge, and in 1980 began his collaboration with Matthew Kaufman. They explored the method of using blastocysts for the isolation of embryonic stem cells. After Kaufman left, Evans continued his work, upgrading his laboratory skills to the newest technologies, isolated the embryonic stem cell of the early mouse embryo and established it in a cell culture. He genetically modified and implanted it into adult female mice with the intent of creating genetically modified offspring, work for which he was awarded the Nobel Prize in 2007. In 2015, he was elected a Fellow of the Learned Society of Wales. Today, genetically modified mice are considered vital for medical research.

== Early life and education ==
Evans was born in Stroud, Gloucestershire, on 1 January 1941. His mother was a teacher. His father maintained a mechanical workshop and taught Evans to use tools and machines including a lathe. Evans was close to his grandfather who was a choir master at a Baptist Church for over 40 years, and whose main interests were music, poetry, and the Baptist Church. His mother's brother was a professor of astronomy at the University of Cambridge. As a boy Evans was quiet, shy and inquisitive. He liked science, and his parents encouraged his education. He remembers loving old science books and receiving an electric experimental set which he wanted for Christmas. He attributes to a chemistry set, from which he learned basic chemistry, for the development of one of his "greatest amateur passions". He went to middle school at St Dunstan's College, an independent school for boys in South East London, where he started chemistry and physics classes, and studied biology. He worked hard studying for the University of Cambridge entrance exams. At school he was one of the best pupils, although not at the top of the class.

Evans won a major scholarship to Christ's College, Cambridge, at a time when there were many advances in genetics being made. He studied zoology, botany and chemistry, but soon dropped zoology and added biochemistry, finding himself drawn to plant physiology and function. He went to seminars by Sydney Brenner and attended lectures by Jacques Monod. He graduated from Christ's College with a BA in 1963; although, he did not take his final examinations, because he was ill with glandular fever. He decided on a career examining genetic control of vertebrate development. He moved to University College London where he had a fortunate position as a research assistant, learning laboratory skills under Dr Elizabeth Deuchar. His goal at the time was "to isolate developmentally controlled m-RNA". He was awarded a PhD in 1969.

== Career and research ==
He became a lecturer in the Anatomy and Embryology department at University College London, where he did research and taught PhD students and undergraduates. In 1978, he moved to the Department of Genetics, at the University of Cambridge, where his work in association with Matthew Kaufman began in 1980. They developed the idea of using blastocysts for the isolation of embryonic stem cells.

After Kaufman left to take up a professorship in Anatomy in Edinburgh, Evans continued his work, branching out eclectically, "drawn into a number of fascinating fields of biology and medicine." In October 1985, he visited the Whitehead Institute, Cambridge, Massachusetts, for one month of practical work to learn the most recent laboratory techniques.

In the 1990s, he was a fellow at St Edmund's College, Cambridge. In 1999, he became Professor of Mammalian Genetics and Director of the School of Biosciences at Cardiff University, where he worked until he retired at the end of 2007. He became a Knight Bachelor in the 2004 New Year Honours in recognition of his work in stem cell research. He received the accolade from Prince Charles at Buckingham Palace on 25 June 2004. In 2007, he was awarded the Nobel Prize in Physiology or Medicine along with Mario Capecchi and Oliver Smithies for their work in discovering a method for introducing homologous recombination in mice employing embryonic stem cells. Evans was appointed president of Cardiff University and was inaugurated into that position on 23 November 2009. Subsequently, Evans became Chancellor of Cardiff University in 2012. He is an Honorary Fellow of St Edmund's College, Cambridge.

=== Stem cell research ===
Evans and Kaufman isolated the embryonic stem cells from early embryos (embryoblasts) of mice and established them in cell cultures. These early embryonic cells have the potential to differentiate into any of the cells of the adult organism. They modified these stem cells genetically and placed them in the wombs of female mice so they would give birth to genetically modified offspring.

In 1981, Evans and Kaufman published results for experiments in which they described how they isolated embryonic stem cells from mouse blastocysts and grew them in cell cultures. This was also achieved by Gail R. Martin, independently, in the same year. Eventually, Evans was able to isolate the embryonic stem cell of the early mouse embryo and establish it in a cell culture. He then genetically modified it and implanted it into adult female mice with the intent of creating genetically modified offspring, the forebears of the laboratory mice that are considered so vital to medical research today. The availability of these cultured stem cells eventually made possible the introduction of specific gene alterations into the germ line of mice and the creation of transgenic mice to use as experimental models for human illnesses.

Evans and his collaborators showed that they could introduce a new gene into cultured embryonic stem cells and then use such genetically transformed cells to make chimeric embryos. In some chimeric embryos, the genetically altered stem cells produced gametes, thus allowing transmission of the artificially induced mutation into future generations of mice. In this way, transgenic mice with induced mutations in the enzyme Hypoxanthine-guanine phosphoribosyltransferase (HPRT) were created. The HPRT mutations were produced by retroviral insertion; it was proposed that by taking advantage of genetic recombination between the normal HPRT gene and an artificial gene sequenced added to the cultured embryonic stem cells, "it may also eventually be possible to produce specific alterations in endogenous genes through homologous recombination with cloned copies modified in vitro". The production of transgenic mice using this proposed approach was accomplished in the laboratories of Oliver Smithies, and of Mario Capecchi.

=== Commercial activities and clinical research ===
Evans co-founded the stem cell company Celixir (formerly Cell Therapy Ltd) in 2009 with entrepreneur Ajan Reginald. The company has developed stem cell therapies for heart disease, including early-stage clinical trials investigating cardiac regeneration.

Earlier clinical studies conducted by the company in Greece between 2012 and 2015 were reported to have taken place without appropriate authorisation from national regulatory bodies. An Editorial Expression of Concern published by the Journal of Cardiovascular Translational Research stated that the study had not obtained required approvals from the Greek National Ethics Committee or the national medicines regulator. Evans disagreed with this editorial expression of concern.

The journal also reported discrepancies in clinical data and advised that aspects of the findings should be interpreted with caution.

The UK Health Research Authority reviewed aspects of a subsequent UK trial and required amendments to patient information materials. Following these issues, Cardiff University and the journal initiated reviews into related research.

== Personal life ==
When Evans was a student in Cambridge he met his wife, Judith Clare Williams, at a lunch held by his aunt, wife of an astronomy professor. After they were engaged, their relationship did not go well and Judith went to live in Canada; however, a year later she returned to England and they married. In 1978, they moved from London to Cambridge with their young children, where they lived for more than 20 years before moving to Cardiff. They have one daughter and two sons. Their older son was a student at the University of Cambridge and their younger son was a boarder at Christ Church Cathedral School in Oxford and sang in Christ Church Cathedral choir.

His wife Judith Clare Williams, granddaughter of Christopher Williams, was appointed MBE for her services to practice nursing in the 1993 New Year Honours. She was diagnosed with breast cancer at about the time the family moved to Cardiff. She works for breast cancer charities, and Martin Evans has become a trustee of Breakthrough Breast Cancer.

== Awards and honours ==
Evans has won numerous awards including:

- 1990 – Elected an EMBO Member
- 1993 – Elected a Fellow of the Royal Society (FRS)
- 1999 – The USA charity March of Dimes awarded their annual prize in Developmental Biology for research into embryonic growth jointly to Professor Richard Gardner at the University of Oxford and Evans.
- 2001 – Albert Lasker Award for Basic Medical Research, jointly with Mario Capecchi and Oliver Smithies.
- 2002 – Honorary doctorate from Mount Sinai School of Medicine, New York, USA.
- 2004 – Appointed Knight Bachelor in the New Year Honours "for services to medical science".
- 2005 – Honorary doctorate from the University of Bath, England.
- 2007 – Nobel Prize in Physiology or Medicine, jointly with Mario Capecchi and Oliver Smithies.
- 2008 – Fellow of the Academy of Medical Sciences.
- 2008 – Honorary doctorate from University College London, England.
- 2009 – Gold Medal of the Royal Society of Medicine
- 2009 – Copley Medal of the Royal Society
- 2009 – Member of the Advisory Board of the Faraday Institute
- 2009 – UCL Prize Lecture in Clinical Science
- 2015 – Elected a Fellow of the Learned Society of Wales

Academic offices
Preceded by Neil Kinnock	Chancellor of Cardiff University (previously known as President); 2009–2017	Succeeded by Jenny Randerson
