= Jan Breslow =

American physician and medical researcher

- Education: Columbia University
- Awards: Heinrich Wieland Prize (1991)
- Scientific career
- Workplaces: Rockefeller University; Boston Children's Hospital; Harvard Medical School

Jan Leslie Breslow (born 1943) is an American physician and medical researcher who studies atherosclerosis. As of 2017, he is Frederick Henry Leonhardt Professor at Rockefeller University and directs the university's Laboratory of Biochemical Genetics and Metabolism.

== Biography ==
Breslow attended Columbia College, Columbia University, gaining AB (1963) and MA (1964) degrees in chemistry. He then studied at Harvard Medical School, receiving his MD in 1968. He worked in pediatric medicine at the Boston Children's Hospital (1968–70) and then held a post-doctoral position at the National Heart, Lung, and Blood Institute (1970–73).

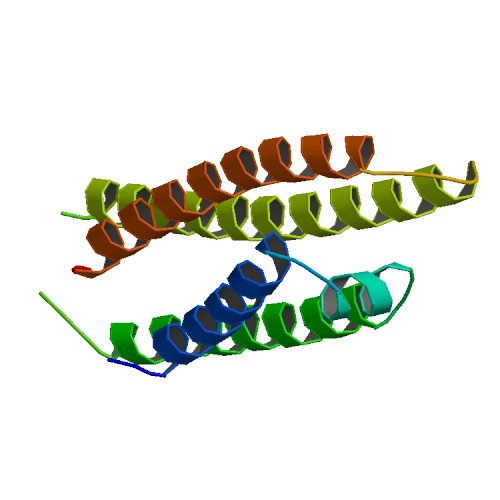
Human apolipoprotein E

In 1973, he took up a post as head of the metabolism division of Boston Children's Hospital, as well as successively instructor, assistant and associate professor in pediatric medicine at Harvard Medical School. In 1984, he moved to Rockefeller University as a professor, and in 1986, was appointed Frederick Henry Leonhardt Professor at the Laboratory of Biochemical Genetics and Metabolism. In 2014, he was appointed director of the university's Sackler Center for Biomedicine and Nutrition. He also works at Rockefeller University Hospital as a senior physician and was physician-in-chief in the 1990s.

== Research ==
Breslow's research has focused on the genetic factors that govern an individual's predisposition to develop atherosclerosis. He started to work on the genetics of cholesterol handling in the late 1970s, and in the early 1980s, with Vassilis Zannis, he was one of the earliest to dissect the different variants of human apolipoprotein E (ApoE), a component of very low-density lipoprotein. People with different ApoE variants are now known to have different risks not only of heart disease but also of Alzheimer's disease. In 1992, his group found that deleting the mouse gene for ApoE caused the animals to develop elevated blood cholesterol levels and atherosclerosis within around 6 months, on a normal diet. Nobuyo Maeda's group at the University of North Carolina at Chapel Hill also independently created ApoE knockouts (apoe^{−/−}) that developed atherosclerosis at the same time. The ApoE knockout was the earliest mouse model of the disease, and has been widely used in atherosclerosis research.

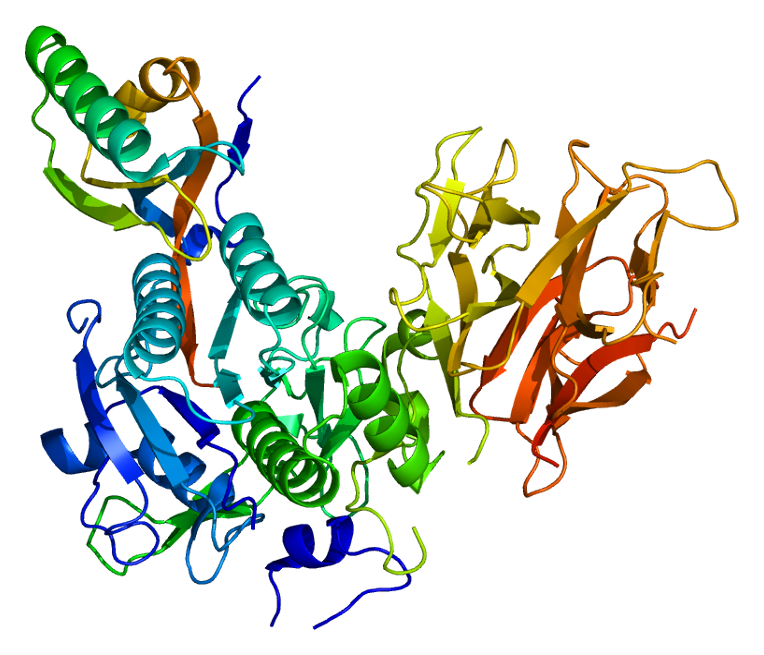
Human PCSK9

His group has subsequently researched other genes associated with atherosclerosis, and for example, in 2003, were among the first to identify and characterize PCSK9, which encodes an enzyme acting in a novel cholesterol regulatory pathway. Antibodies targeting PCSK9 were approved by the US FDA as a novel class of cholesterol-lowering drugs in 2015.

== Awards and honours ==
Breslow is an elected fellow of the American Society for Clinical Investigation (1984), US National Academy of Sciences (1995), Deutsche Akademie der Naturforscher Leopoldina (1996) and the Institute of Medicine (1997). He served as president of the American Heart Association – using the position to lobby vigorously for more government funding for research into heart disease – and has received several awards from the association, including their Lifetime Research Achievement Award in 2010. He has also served as vice president of the American Society for Clinical Investigation. He has won the E. Mead Johnson Award of the American Academy of Pediatrics (1984), the Heinrich Wieland Prize (1991) and the Bristol-Myers Squibb Award for Cardiovascular Research (2000). In March 2013, Rockefeller University organized a symposium entitled "Genetics of Lipid Disorders and Atherosclerosis" to mark his seventieth birthday.

== Personal life ==
Breslow is married to Marilyn G. Breslow, an investment manager and sculptor; the couple have two sons. Breslow is one of the signatories of a letter entitled "No Need to Panic About Global Warming", which was published in The Wall Street Journal in 2012.

== Selected publications ==
- Kara N. Maxwell; Jan L. Breslow (2004), "Adenoviral-mediated expression of Pcsk9 in mice results in a low-density lipoprotein receptor knockout phenotype", Proceedings of the National Academy of Sciences USA, 101 (18): 7100–5, Bibcode:2004PNAS..101.7100M, doi:10.1073/pnas.0402133101, PMC 406472, PMID 15118091
- Yutaka Nakashima; Andrew S. Plump; Elaine W. Raines; Jan L. Breslow; Russell Ross (1994), "ApoE-deficient mice develop lesions of all phases of atherosclerosis throughout the arterial tree", Arteriosclerosis, Thrombosis, and Vascular Biology, 14 (1): 133–40, doi:10.1161/01.ATV.14.1.133, PMID 8274468
- Andrew S. Plump; Jonathan D. Smith; Tony Hayek; Katriina Aalto-Setälä; Annemarie Walsh; Judy G. Verstuyft; Edward M. Rubin; Jan L. Breslow (1992), "Severe hypercholesterolemia and atherosclerosis in apolipoprotein E-deficient mice created by homologous recombination in ES cells", Cell, 71 (2): 343–53, doi:10.1016/0092-8674(92)90362-g, PMID 1423598, S2CID 29828640
- Katherine A. Hajjar; Dov Gavishi; Jan L. Breslow; Ralph L. Nachman (1989), "Lipoprotein(a) modulation of endothelial cell surface fibrinolysis and its potential role in atherosclerosis", Nature, 339 (6222): 303–5, Bibcode:1989Natur.339..303H, doi:10.1038/339303a0, PMID 2524666, S2CID 4313247
- Vassilis I. Zannis; Jan L. Breslow (1981), "Human very low density lipoprotein apolipoprotein E isoprotein polymorphism is explained by genetic variation and posttranslational modification", Biochemistry, 20 (4): 1033–41, doi:10.1021/bi00507a059, PMID 6260135
