= KOSR =

Formula for stem cell culture

Within molecular and cell biology, KOSR, knockout serum replacement, is a defined serum-free formulation optimized to grow and maintain undifferentiated embryonic stem cells in culture. It is more stable, more consistent in quality and performs better in the maintenance of undifferentiated status of embryonic stem (ES) and induced pluripotent stem (iPS) cells than fetal bovine serum, previously the standard for nutritive supplementation of ES and iPS cells. KOSR has been shown to be more effective when used in conjugation with knockout-DMEM.
