= Mario Capecchi =

Italian-American molecular geneticist (born 1937)

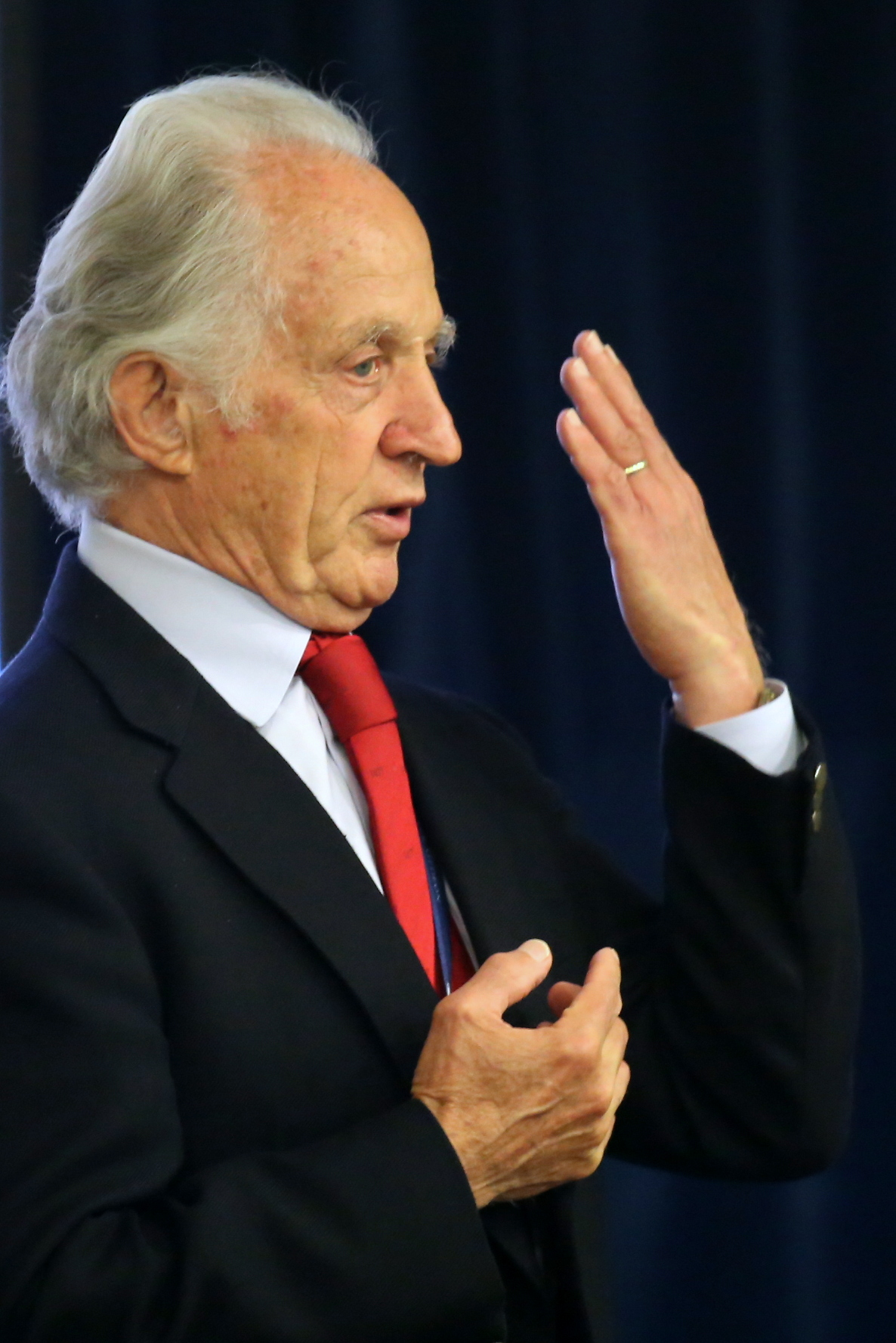
- Capecchi at a conference in 2013
- Born: Mario Ramberg Capecchi; October 6, 1937 (age 89); Verona, Kingdom of Italy
- Education: Antioch College; Harvard University
- Known for: Hox genes in knockout mice
- Awards: Kyoto Prize (1996); Franklin Medal (1997); Albert Lasker Award for Basic Medical Research (2001); Massry Prize (2002); Wolf Prize in Medicine (2002); Nobel Prize in Physiology or Medicine (2007)
- Scientific career
- Fields: Genetics
- Workplaces: Harvard Medical School; University of Utah
- Thesis: On the Mechanism of Suppression and Polypeptide Chain Initiation (1967)
- Doctoral advisor: James D. Watson
- Website: capecchi.genetics.utah.edu

Mario Ramberg Capecchi (Italian: [ˈmaːrjo kaˈpekki]; born October 6, 1937) is an Italian-born American molecular geneticist and a co-awardee of the 2007 Nobel Prize in Physiology or Medicine for discovering a method to create mice in which a specific gene is turned off, known as knockout mice. He shared the prize with Martin Evans and Oliver Smithies. Capecchi is Distinguished Professor of Human Genetics and Biology at the University of Utah School of Medicine.

== Life ==
Mario Capecchi was born in Verona, Italy, as the only child of Luciano Capecchi and Lucy Ramberg, an Italian-born daughter of American-born Impressionist painter Lucy Dodd Ramberg and German archaeologist Walter Ramberg. His parents weren't married, and due to the turmoil in Europe caused by World War II, the details of his early life are unclear. In 1941 he and his mother were living near Bolzano, about 160 miles north of his father in Reggio Emilia when his mother was arrested and deported for pamphleteering and belonging to an anti-Fascist group. Prior to her arrest she had made contingency plans by selling her belongings and giving the proceeds to a nearby peasant family to care for her child. However, it was not long before Mario ended up on the streets of Bolzano. In July 1942, a few months before his fifth birthday, Italian records suggest he was reunited with his father in Reggio Emilia, which Mario did confirm but stated that he stayed with his father for only for a few brief periods and that he mostly lived on the streets until he was placed in an orphanage towards the end of the war.

Mario almost died of malnutrition. His mother survived the war in Germany (part of the reason the details of his early life are unclear is that she would never talk about her experiences), and when it ended she began a year-long search for him. She finally found him on his ninth birthday in a hospital bed in Reggio Emilia ill with a fever and subsisting on a daily bowl of chicory coffee and bread crust. She took him to Rome, where he had his first bath since he had left her care and where, with money sent by his uncle, Edward Ramberg, an American physicist at RCA, they made arrangements to depart to the United States. He and his mother moved to Pennsylvania to live at an "intentionally cooperative community" called Bryn Gweled, which had been co-founded by his uncle. (Capecchi's other maternal uncle, Walter Ramberg, was also a prominent American physicist). He graduated from George School, a Quaker boarding school in Bucks County, Pennsylvania, in 1956.

Capecchi received his Bachelor of Science in chemistry and physics in 1961 from Antioch College in Ohio. Capecchi came to MIT as a graduate student intending to study physics and mathematics, but during the course of his studies, he became interested in molecular biology. His change of interest was driven by the preference of working with few scientists and conducting experiments that did not require the use of big machines. He subsequently transferred to Harvard to join the lab of James D. Watson, co-discoverer of the structure of DNA. Capecchi received his PhD in biophysics in 1967 from Harvard University, with his doctoral thesis completed under the tutelage of Watson. Capecchi was a Junior Fellow of the Society of Fellows at Harvard University from 1967 to 1969. In 1969 he became an assistant professor in the Department of Biochemistry at Harvard Medical School. He was promoted to associate professor in 1971. In 1973 he joined the faculty at the University of Utah. Since 1988 Capecchi has also been an investigator of the Howard Hughes Medical Institute. He is a member of the National Academy of Sciences. He has given a talk for Duke University's Program in Genetics and Genomics as part of their Distinguished Lecturer Series. He was the speaker for the 2010 Racker Lectures in Biology & Medicine and Cornell Distinguished Lecture in Cell and Molecular Biology at Cornell University. He is a member of the Italy-USA Foundation. After the Nobel committee publicly announced that Capecchi was awarded the Nobel prize, an Austrian woman named Marlene Bonelli claimed that Capecchi was her long-lost half-brother.

In May 2008, Capecchi met Bonelli, then 69, in Northern Italy, and confirmed that she was his sister.

== Knockout mice ==
Capecchi was awarded the Nobel prize for creating a knockout mouse. This is a mouse, created by genetic engineering and in vitro fertilization, in which a particular gene has been turned off. For this work, Capecchi was awarded the 2007 Nobel prize for medicine or physiology, along with Martin Evans and Oliver Smithies, who also contributed. Capecchi has also pursued a systematic analysis of the mouse Hox gene family. This gene family plays a key role in the control of embryonic development in all multicellular animals. They determine the placement of cellular development in the proper order along the axis of the body from head to toe.

== Honors ==
- 1969 – Eli Lilly Award in Biological Chemistry
- 1992 – Bristol-Myers Squibb Award for Distinguished Achievement in Neuroscience Research
- 1993 – Gairdner Foundation International Award for Achievements in Medical Sciences
- 1993 – Gairdner Foundation International Award
- 1994 – General Motors Cancer Research Foundation Alfred P. Sloan Jr. Prize
- 1996 – Kyoto Prize in Basic Sciences
- 1996 – German Molecular Bioanalytics Prize
- 1997 – Franklin Medal for Advancing Our Knowledge of the Physical Sciences
- 1998 – Feodor Lynen Lectureship
- 1998 – Rosenblatt Prize for Excellence
- 1998 – Baxter Award for Distinguished Research in the Biomedical Sciences
- 1999 – Helen Lowe Bamberger Colby and John E. Bamberger Presidential Endowed Chair in the University of Utah Health Sciences Center
- 2000 – Lectureship in the Life Sciences for the Collège de France
- 2000 – Horace Mann Distinguished Alumni Award, Antioch College
- 2000 – Italian Premio Phoenix-Anni Verdi for Genetics Research Award
- 2001 – Albert Lasker Award for Basic Medical Research, co-winner with Martin Evans and Oliver Smithies
- 2001 – Spanish Jiménez-Díaz Prize
- 2001 – Pioneers of Progress Award
- 2001 – National Medal of Science
- 2002 – John Scott Medal Award
- 2002 – Massry Prize from the Keck School of Medicine, University of Southern California
- 2003 – Pezcoller Foundation-AACR International Award for Cancer Research
- 2002–2003 – Wolf Prize in Medicine
- 2005 – March of Dimes Prize in Developmental Biology
- 2007 – Jacob Heskel Gabbay Award for Biotechnology and Medicine
- 2007 – Nobel Prize in Physiology or Medicine, co-winner with Martin Evans and Oliver Smithies
- 2008 – American Heart Association Distinguished Scientist Award
- 2011 – Cátedra Santiago Grisolía Prize, Valencia Spain
- 2011 – Mike Hogg Award, The University of Texas MD Anderson Cancer Center
- 2012 – UCSF medal
- 2012 – Honorary Doctorate Degree, University of Bologna Medical School, Italy
- 2013 – Honorary Doctorate Degree, Cardiff University, United Kingdom
- 2013 – Honorary Doctorate Degree, Ben-Gurion University, Israel
- 2013 – Trinity College Historical Society Gold Medal for Outstanding Contributions to Public Discourse, Dublin Ireland
- 2014 – Keynote Speaker at the Congress of Future Medical Leaders
- 2015 – American Association for Cancer Research Lifetime Achievement Award
- 2017 – ISTT Prize from the International Society for Transgenic Technologies
- 2017 - Science Director, National Academy of Future Physicians and Medical Scientists
- 2024 – Honorary Doctorate Degree, Yale University, United States
