= Oliver Smithies =

British-American geneticist (1925–2017)

Oliver Smithies ForMemRS
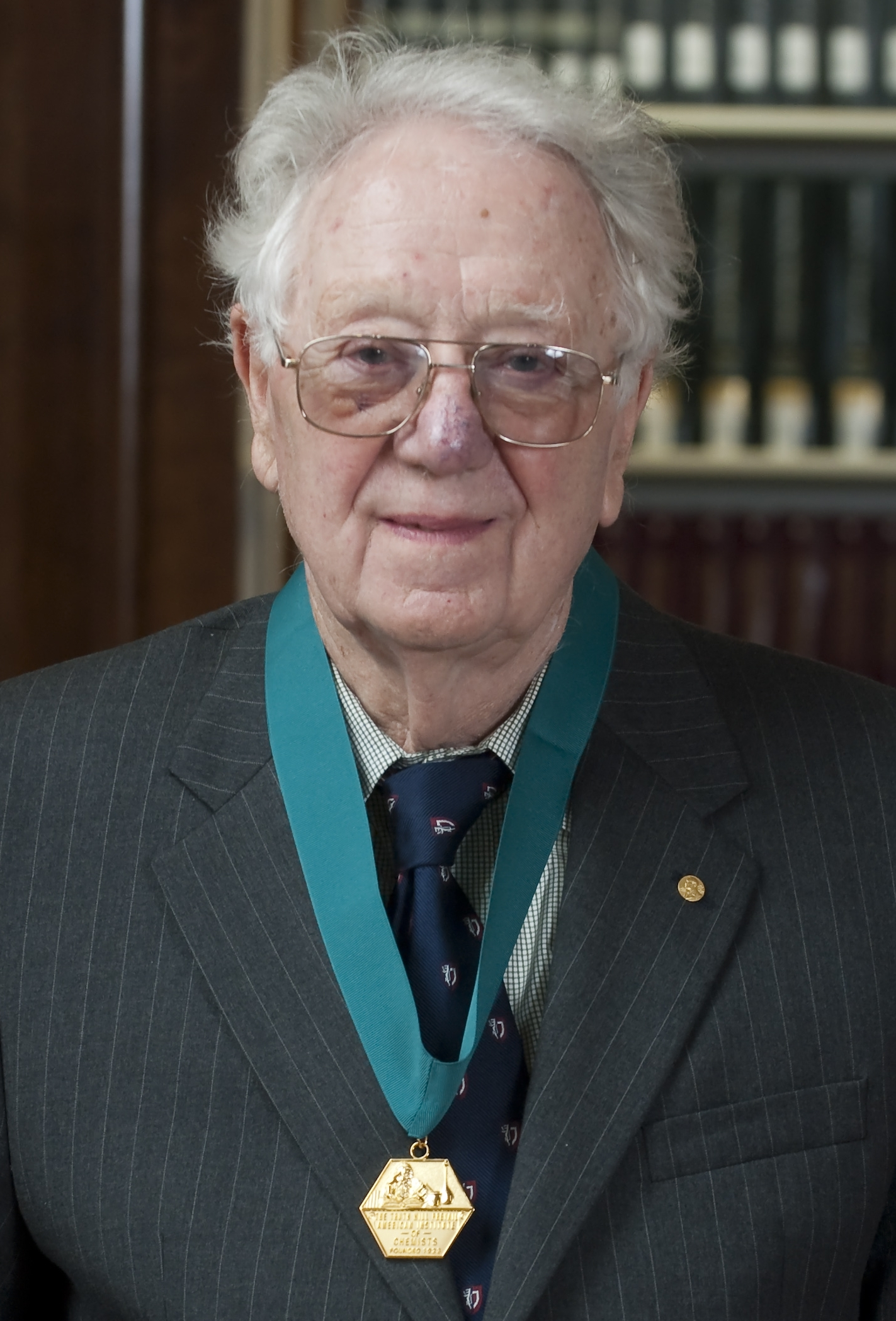
- Smithies with the American Institute of Chemists Gold Medal (2009)
- Born: 23 June 1925; Halifax, West Yorkshire, England
- Died: 10 January 2017 (aged 91); Chapel Hill, North Carolina, US
- Education: University of Oxford (BA, DPhil)
- Known for: Gel electrophoresis; Gene targeting
- Spouse: Nobuyo Maeda
- Awards: Lasker Award (2001); Wolf Prize in Medicine (2002); Thomas Hunt Morgan Medal (2007); Nobel Prize in Physiology or Medicine (2007)
- Scientific career
- Fields: Biochemistry; Genetics
- Workplaces: University of Toronto; University of Wisconsin–Madison; University of North Carolina at Chapel Hill
- Thesis: Physico-chemical properties of solutions of proteins (1951)
- Doctoral advisor: Alexander G. Ogston

Oliver Smithies (23 June 1925 – 10 January 2017) was a British-American geneticist and physical biochemist. He is known for introducing starch as a medium for gel electrophoresis in 1955, and for the discovery, simultaneously with Mario Capecchi and Martin Evans, of the technique of homologous recombination of transgenic DNA with genomic DNA, a much more reliable method of altering animal genomes than previously used, and the technique behind gene targeting and knockout mice. He received the Nobel Prize in Physiology or Medicine in 2007 for his genetics work.

== Early life and education ==
Smithies was born in Halifax, West Yorkshire, England, to William Smithies and his wife Doris, née Sykes. His father sold life insurance policies and his mother taught English at Halifax Technical College. He had a twin brother and a younger sister. He attended a primary school in the nearby village of Copley and then went to Heath Grammar School in Halifax. He said that his love of science came from an early fascination with radios and telescopes.

He attended Balliol College, Oxford on a Brackenbury Scholarship, initially reading medicine. He studied anatomy and physiology, winning a prize in anatomy, and graduated with a first-class Bachelor of Arts degree in animal physiology, including biochemistry, in 1946. Inspired by tutorials from Alexander G. Ogston on applying physical chemistry to biological systems, Smithies then switched away from medicine to earn a second bachelor's degree in chemistry. He published his first research paper, co-written with Ogston, in 1948. In 1951, he received a Master of Arts degree and a Doctor of Philosophy in biochemistry under Ogston's supervision; his thesis was entitled "Physico-chemical properties of solutions of proteins".

== Career ==
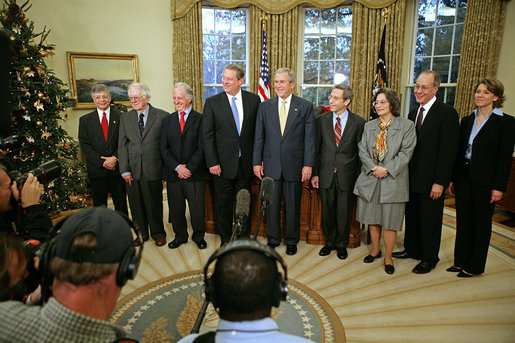
Oliver Smithies (second on the left)

Smithies was awarded a Commonwealth Fund fellowship to take up a post-doctoral position in the United States, in the laboratory of J. W. Williams at the University of Wisconsin–Madison's Department of Chemistry. A problem with acquiring a U.S. visa, due to a condition of the Commonwealth Fund fellowship, then forced him to leave the U.S. From 1953 to 1960, he worked as an associate research faculty member, under insulin researcher David A. Scott, in the Connaught Medical Research Laboratory at the University of Toronto in Canada. He learned medical genetics from Norma Ford Walker at the Hospital for Sick Children in Toronto.

In 1960, Smithies returned to the University of Wisconsin–Madison, where he worked in the Department of Genetics until 1988 as, successively, assistant, associate and Leon J. Cole and Hilldale Professor of Genetics and Medical Genetics. Subsequently, he was the Excellence Professor of Pathology and Laboratory Medicine at the University of North Carolina at Chapel Hill. He continued to work in his lab there daily into his eighties. He co-authored a total of more than 350 research papers and reviews, dating from 1948 to 2016.

== Research ==
Smithies developed the technique of gel electrophoresis using a starch matrix, as a sideline of (unproductive) research into an insulin precursor molecule, at the University of Toronto. This improved the ability to resolve proteins by electrophoresis. He was assisted technically in his later electrophoresis work by Otto Hiller. He used starch electrophoresis to reveal differences between normal human plasma proteins, and in collaboration with Norma Ford Walker, showed that the variation was inherited, which stimulated his interest in genetics.

While at the University of Wisconsin in the 1980s, Smithies developed gene targeting in mice, a method of replacing single mouse genes using homologous recombination. Mario Capecchi also developed the technique independently. This research is the basis of methods used worldwide to investigate the role of particular genes in a wide range of human diseases including cancer, cystic fibrosis and diabetes. In 2002, Smithies worked with his wife, Nobuyo Maeda, studying high blood pressure using genetically altered mice.

== Awards and honors ==
Smithies won the 2001 Albert Lasker Award for Basic Medical Research, jointly with Martin Evans (Cardiff University) and Mario Capecchi (University of Utah), for their work on homologous recombination. He received the Wolf Prize in Medicine, with Capecchi and Ralph L. Brinster, in 2002/3. He won the 2007 Nobel Prize in Physiology or Medicine, jointly with Capecchi and Evans, "for their discoveries of principles for introducing specific gene modifications in mice by the use of embryonic stem cells."

His other awards include two Gairdner Foundation International Awards (1990 and 1993), the North Carolina Award for Science (1993), the Alfred P. Sloan, Jr. Prize from the General Motors Foundation, jointly with Capecchi (1994), the Ciba Award from the American Heart Foundation (1996), the Bristol Myers Squibb Award (1997), the Association of American Medical Colleges' Award for Distinguished Research, jointly with Capecchi (1998), the International Okamoto Award from the Japan Vascular Disease Research Foundation (2000), the O. Max Gardner Award, the highest award for faculty in the University of North Carolina system (2002), the Massry Prize of the Meira and Shaul G. Massry Foundation (2002), shared with Capecchi, the March of Dimes Prize in Developmental Biology, jointly with Capecchi (2005), and the American Institute of Chemists Gold Medal (2009).

Smithies was elected to the United States National Academy of Sciences (1971), the American Academy of Arts and Sciences (1978), the American Association for the Advancement of Science (1986), the Institute of Medicine (2003), and as a foreign member of the Royal Society (ForMemRS; 1998). He received honorary degrees from the University of Chicago (1991), the University of São Paulo (2008) and the University of Oxford (2011).

A blue plaque to him was erected by the Halifax Civic Trust.

== Personal life ==
Smithies married Lois Kitze, a virologist at the University of Wisconsin, in the 1950s; they separated in 1978. His second wife, Nobuyo Maeda, is a pathology professor at the University of North Carolina. Smithies was a naturalized American citizen, and, despite being color-blind, was a licensed private airplane pilot who enjoyed gliding. He described himself as an atheist.

Smithies died on 10 January 2017 at the age of 91.
