= Fetal tissue implant =

Experimental medical therapy

Fetal tissue implant or fetal cell therapy is an experimental medical therapy where researchers implant tissue from a fetus into a person as treatment of a disease. In the case of Parkinson's disease, it is hoped that the fetal tissue would produce chemicals, specifically dopamine, which is lacking in the diseased brain. This therapy is also being investigated for treatment of Alzheimer's disease and Huntington's disease. Fetal tissue is unique since it is fast growing and has a lower possibility of rejection from the host's immune system than adult cells.

== Uses ==
In 1982, seven people in Santa Clara County, California were diagnosed with Parkinsonism after having used MPPP contaminated with MPTP. In 1992, two of the seven patients were successfully treated at Lund University Hospital in Sweden with neural grafts of fetal tissue. One patient, who had been essentially paralyzed, regained enough motor function to ride a bicycle.

== Ethical and political concerns ==
Because the source of the tissue is aborted fetuses, there are significant legal and ethical issues being discussed. Federal funding for embryonic tissue research was restricted in the United States under Presidents Reagan and Bush before being lifted under the Clinton administration.

== See also ==
- Stem cell
