= Robert D. Schreiber =

American immunologist

Robert David Schreiber
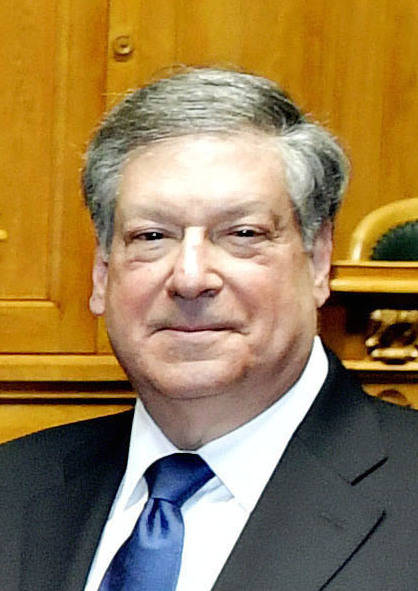
- Robert Schreiber, in 2017.
- Born: April 1946 (age 80); Rochester, New York
- Citizenship: U.S.
- Education: State University of New York at Buffalo
- Known for: Research in cancer immunology
- Scientific career
- Fields: Scientist; Immunologist; Educator
- Workplaces: Scripps Research Institute; Washington University in St. Louis

Robert D. Schreiber (born 1946) is an immunologist and currently is the Alumni Endowed Professor of Pathology and Immunology at Washington University School of Medicine. Schreiber has led a major revision in our understanding of how the immune system interacts with cancer. His work on the cancer immunoediting hypothesis has helped reveal that the immune system is not only capable of destroying cancers, but can also drive them into a dormant state that, in some cases, results in an improved state of malignancy.

== Education & early career ==
Schreiber obtained his B.A. and PhD in biochemistry from the State University of New York at Buffalo. His postdoctoral training was with Han Mueller-Eberhart at the Scripps Clinic studying the complement system. He joined the Scripps faculty in 1976 and rose to associate member with tenure at Scripps before joining Washington University in St. Louis as Professor of Pathology. He was given the Alumni Endowed Professorship in 1990 and became an affiliate of the Ludwig Institute for Cancer Research in 2001.

== Area of expertise ==
Schreiber's work focuses on the concept of immune surveillance in cancer pathogenesis. For over 50 years, scientists have argued about the role of the immune system in preventing the initiation of cancer. The original immune surveillance hypothesis proposed that tumor cells arise naturally and are normally eradicated by the immune system. Tumors would, therefore, only arise if the tumor could develop a mechanism to evade the immune system, or if the immune system were compromised. This hypothesis was directly tested in a landmark paper published by Osias Stutman (1974). In this paper, Stutman tested whether athymic, nude mice which lack an adaptive immune system have an increased incidence of tumors. His finding that the incidence of tumor formation was the same in nude mice, as compared to wild type mice, led to the strong belief, for over 20 years, that the immune system played no role in preventing the initiation or the prevention of tumors. This finding was consistent with the idea that most tumors arise in individuals with normal immune systems. However, a key study published in 2000 by Wilfred Jefferies’ Lab revisited Stutman's experiments using the same nude mouse model and provided the first evidence challenging his conclusions. This was the first study to conclusively demonstrate that the immune system plays a role in controlling tumor formation.

With the explosion of new information about the role of the innate immune system over the last two decades, and with the knowledge that the innate immune system was intact in the nude mice that Stutman had used, Schreiber repeated these experiments using a strain of mice he bred to lack both innate and adaptive immunity. These mice lacked the recombination activating gene (RAG) required for adaptive immune responses and the STAT1 gene that is required for innate responses. Schreiber's lab was the first to generate STAT1 deficient mice and has worked to characterize the important role of this gene in innate immunity.

In 2001, in another landmark paper, Schreiber reported that RAG2 knockout mice, which lack an adaptive immune system (T and B cells), had a dramatically increased rate of tumor formation compared to wild type mice. Collectively, these studies; invalidated the conclusions of the Stutman study, and revived the idea that the immune system could play a critical role. Subsequent work showed that tumors escape immune recognition by losing their antigenicity in a process Scheiber named cancer immunoediting, and Jefferies termed cancer immune escape.

These studies have been critical in forming the scientific basis of many of the immune mediated strategies currently being tested in patients as anti-tumor regimens. Not only do these studies confirm that the immune system can, in fact, play an important role in destroying tumors, but they support the idea that better understanding of immunological recognition and regulation will lead to breakthroughs in our ability to eradicate tumors using the immune system.

== Awards ==
- 1996 Milstein Award for Outstanding Achievements in Interferons and Cytokines, International Society of Interferon and Cytokine Research
- 1998 Society of Leukocyte Biology, Bonazinga Award
- 2001 Cancer Research Institute William B. Coley Award
- 2007 Charles Rodolphe Brupbacher Prize for Cancer Research
- 2008 Carl and Gerty Cori Faculty Achievement Award, Washington University in St. Louis
- 2010 American Academy of Arts and Sciences, member
- 2013 American National Academy of Sciences, member
- Fellow of the American Association for the Advancement of Science
- Member of the Board of Scientific Advisors for the National Cancer Institute
- Affiliate of the Ludwig Institute for Cancer Research
- 2014 AACR-CRI Lloyd J. Old Award in Cancer Immunology
- 2017 Balzan Prize for Immunological Approaches in Cancer Therapy (jointly with James P. Allison).
