= Alviar =

Alviar is a name. Notable people with the name include:

- Mae Cruz-Alviar, Filipino film director
- Rene Alviar (1948–2022), Filipino journalist
- Alviar Lima, Cape Verdean-Dutch retired kickboxer
- Helena Alviar Garcia, Colombian legal scholar
