= John Mendelsohn =

John Mendelsohn may refer to:

- John Mendelsohn (doctor) (1936–2019), American cancer researcher
- John Mendelsohn (musician) (born 1947), American writer, journalist, musician and graphic designer

== See also ==
- Jonathan Mendelsohn, Baron Mendelsohn (born 1966), British lobbyist and Labour political organiser
- Jonathan Mendelsohn (singer) (born 1980), American singer
- John Mendelson (1917–1978), British Labour Party politician
