= Aida Habtezion =

Canadian physician and immunologist

- Born: Eritrea

Academic background
- Education: BSc, Chemistry, University of Alberta; MSc, University of Guelph; MD, McMaster University

Aida Habtezion is an Eritrean physician and immunologist. In 2021, Habtezion took a leave of absence from Stanford University to become the Chief Medical Officer of Pfizer and head of Worldwide Medical and Safety within Worldwide Research, Development, and Medicine.

== Early life and education ==
Habtezion was born in Asmara, Eritrea to Memhir Ethiopia Habtezion and Woizero Roman Haregot. Through her mother, she is the granddaughter of Dejazmach Haregot Abbai who served as Mayor of Asmara from 1963 until 1974. She completed her Bachelor of Science degree in chemistry from the University of Alberta, her Master of Science in nutritional sciences at the University of Guelph, and her medical degree from McMaster University.

== Career ==
Following her clinical fellowship training, Habtezion obtained postdoctoral research training in Immunology at Stanford University. Habtezion was a fellow in the laboratory of Eugene Butcher where she became interested in ulcerative colitis. Habtezion then joined the faculty at Stanford in 2010 as an assistant professor of medicine. Upon joining the faculty, led her own laboratory which "aims to understand immune mechanisms and identify potential immune-based therapeutic targets for pancreatitis and inflammatory bowel disease." As a result of her research, she was elected a member of the American Society for Clinical Investigation in 2017.

During the COVID-19 pandemic, Habtezion co-authored SARS-CoV-2 Testing, Prevalence, and Predictors of COVID-19 in Patients with Inflammatory Bowel Disease in Northern California. In 2021, Habtezion took a leave of absence from Stanford to become the Chief Medical Officer of Pfizer and head of Worldwide Medical and Safety within Worldwide Research, Development, and Medicine.
