= Charles A. Dinarello =

American immunologist

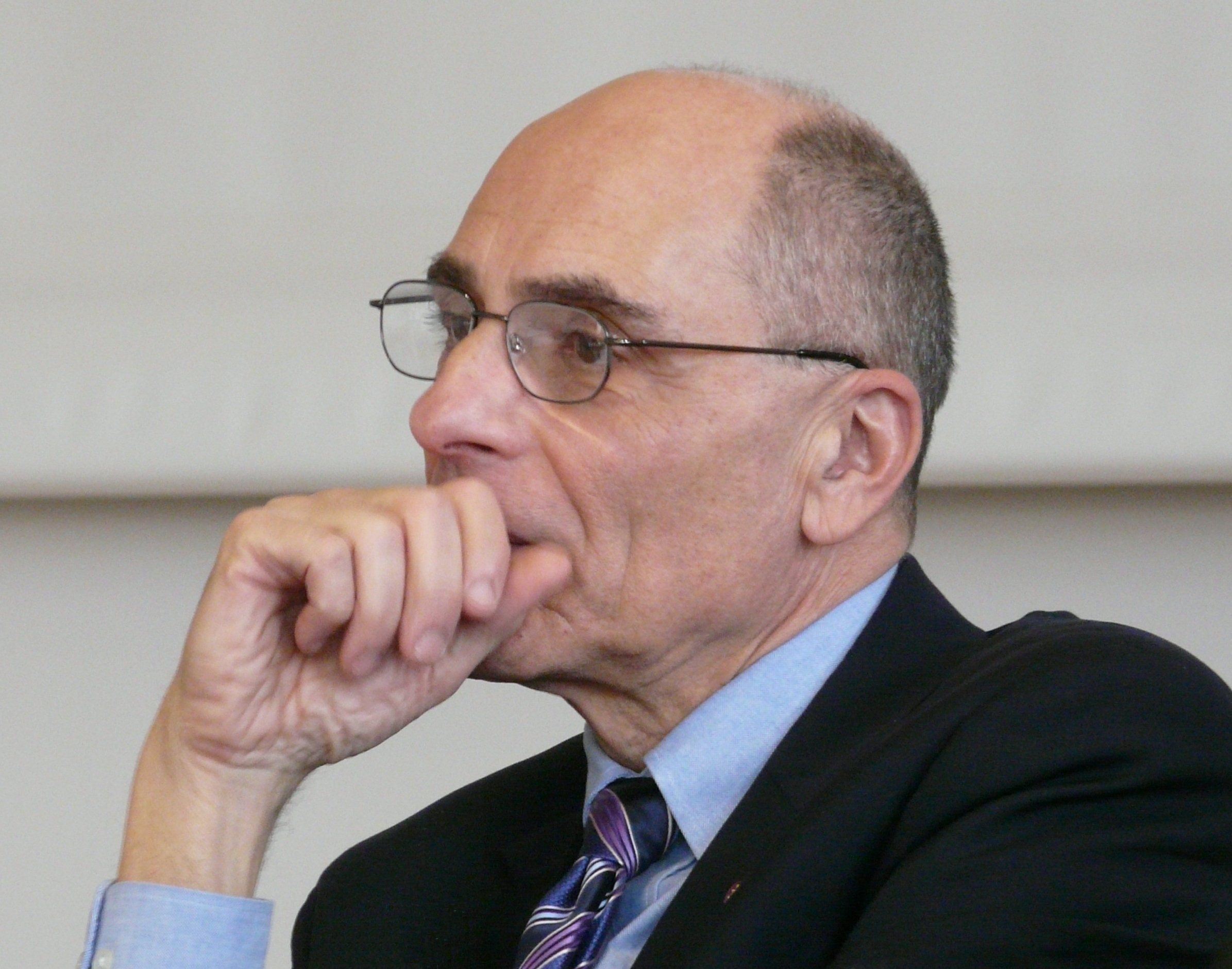
- Charles Dinarello, 2010
- Born: April 22, 1943 (age 83); Boston, Massachusetts
- Education: Yale University
- Known for: Research on inflammatory cytokines
- Awards: Ernst Jung Prize (1993); Crafoord Prize (2009); Albany Medical Center Prize (2009); Paul Ehrlich and Ludwig Darmstaedter Prize (2010); Tang Prize (2020)
- Scientific career
- Fields: Medicine; Immunology
- Workplaces: University of Colorado Denver

Charles A. Dinarello (born April 22, 1943) is a professor of medicine at the University of Colorado at Denver. He is an expert on inflammatory cytokines, specifically Interleukin 1 and other members of the Interleukin 1 Family of cytokines and receptors.

== Education and career ==
Dinarello received his Doctor of Medicine in 1969 at Yale University and since 1996, he is professor of medicine at University of Colorado School of Medicine. He is also Professor of Experimental Medicine atqq3 the Radboud University Medical Center in Nijmegen, The Netherlands. Dinarello is considered one of the founding fathers of cytokines having purified and cloned interleukin-1. This important step established the validation of cytokines as mediators of disease, particularly of inflammation. Current studies blocking IL-1 in humans supports Dinarello's and his co-workers pivotal contributions to cytokine biology and the pathogenesis of inflammatory diseases.

He is fluent in English, Italian and German.

== Awards ==
- 1993: Ernst Jung Prize
- 2006: Hamdan Award for Medical Research Excellence, awarded by Sheikh Hamdan bin Rashid Al Maktoum Award for Medical Sciences, Dubai, United Arab Emirates
- 2009: Crafoord Prize in Polyarthritis (together with Tadamitsu Kishimoto and Toshio Hirano) “for their pioneering work to isolate interleukins, determine their properties and explore their role in the onset of inflammatory diseases”.
- 2009: Albany Medical Center Prize (shared with Ralph M. Steinman and Bruce A. Beutler)
- 2010: Paul Ehrlich and Ludwig Darmstaedter Prize
- 2010: Novartis Prize in Clinical Immunology (together with Juerg Tschopp).
- 2011: Foreign membership of the Royal Netherlands Academy of Arts and Sciences
- 2020: Tang Prize in Biopharmaceutical Science.
