= Novartis Prizes for Immunology =

Prizes for immunology

The Novartis Prizes for Immunology were established by Sandoz in 1990 to honour outstanding research in the field of immunology and were expanded to their current form in 1992. The prizes for basic and clinical immunology are awarded every three years. A special prize was awarded in 2004.

== Sandoz Prize for Immunology ==
- 1990 Max Cooper, Jacques Miller

== Novartis Prize for Basic Immunology ==
- 2016 John Kappler, Philippa Marrack, Harald von Boehmer
- 2013 Robert Coffman, Tim Mosmann
- 2010 Michael Bevan
- 2007 Fred Alt, Klaus Rajewsky, Fritz Melchers
- 2004 Ralph Steinman
- 2001 Klas Kärre, Lorenzo Moretta, Wayne Yokohama
- 1998 Tak Mak
- 1995 Melvin Cohn, Kevin Lafferty, Avrion Mitchison, David Talmage
- 1992 Jack Strominger

== Novartis Prize for Clinical Immunology ==
- 2016 Zelig Eshhar, Carl June, Steven Rosenberg
- 2013 James Allison
- 2010 Charles Dinarello, Jürg Tschopp
- 2007 John Schiller, Doug Lowy, Ian Frazer
- 2004 Hugh McDevitt
- 2001 Alain Fischer
- 1998 Barry Bloom, George Bellamy Mackaness, Andrew McMichael
- 1995 Robert Schwartz, Thierry Boon
- 1992 Tadamitsu Kishimoto, Toshio Hirano

== Special Novartis Prize for Immunology ==
- 2004 Leonard Herzenberg

== See also ==
- List of medicine awards

== Source ==
- "Laureates". Novartis Prizes for Immunology. 3 October 2011. Archived from the original on 29 August 2018.
