= Lars Klareskog =

Biologist

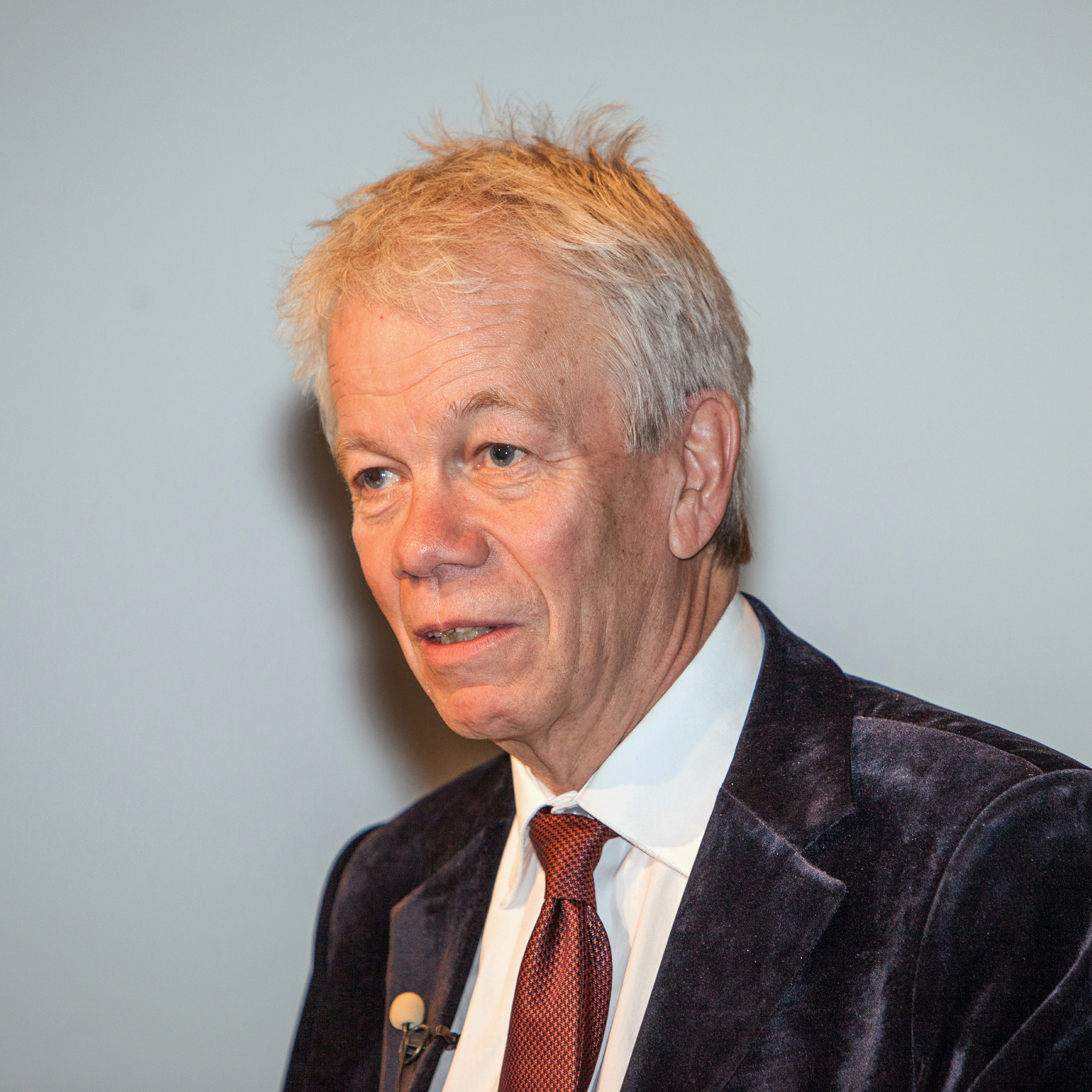
- Klareskog in 2013
- Born: 1945 (age 80–81); Sweden
- Education: Uppsala University (MD, PhD)
- Known for: Research on rheumatoid arthritis Gene-environment interactions in autoimmune diseases Smoking and RA link
- Awards: Crafoord Prize (2013)
- Scientific career
- Fields: Immunology; Rheumatology; Genetics
- Workplaces: Uppsala University; Karolinska Institute
- Thesis: On the structure, function and tissue distribution of HLA-DR and Ia antigens (1978)
- Website: Lars Klareskog Group

Lars Klareskog (born 1945) is a Swedish physician, immunologist, and rheumatologist, known for research into the genetics of autoimmune diseases such as rheumatoid arthritis (RA).

Klareskog received his medical degree from the University of Uppsala in 1974 and received his doctorate in 1978 with thesis On the structure, function and tissue distribution of HLA-DR and Ia antigens. From 1990 to 1993, he held the chair of clinical immunology at Uppsala University. He then held the chair of rheumatology at the Karolinska Institute and the Karolinska Clinic until 2012 and was head of the Rheumatology Clinic and Research Group. Since 2008 he is also director of the Center for Molecular Medicine.

In the mid-2000s, he and his research team found that, in patients with recent-onset rheumatoid arthritis (RA), previous smoking was dose-dependently associated with the occurrence of antibodies to the α-amino acid citrulline. The presence of HLA-DR shared epitope (SE) genes was a risk factor for RA with the presence of anticitrulline antibodies but not for RA without the presence of anticitrulline antibodies. For smokers there was a large interaction between smoking and HLA-DR SE genes for anticitrulline-positive RA but not for anticitrulline-negative RA.

He has been a visiting professor and visiting scholar at Harvard Medical School, Imperial College London (Kennedy Institute of Rheumatology), Cornell University Hospital of Special Surgery, Seattle, Leeds and Denver (University of Colorado).

In 2013 he received the Crafoord Prize with Robert J. Winchester and Peter K. Gregersen for polyarthritis research.

From 1995 to 2012 he was a member of the Nobel Committee.

== Selected publications ==
- with H. Källberg et al.: Gene-gene and gene-environment interactions involving HLA-DRB1, PTPN22, and smoking in two subsets of rheumatoid arthritis, American J. Hum. Genetics, Vol. 80, 2007, pp. 867-875 doi:10.1086/516736
- with E.F. Remmers et al.: STAT4 and the risk of rheumatoid arthritis and systemic lupus erythematosus. In: New England Journal of Medicine, Vol. 357, 2007, pp. 977-986. doi:10.1056/NEJMoa073003
- with J. Rönnelid, K. Lundberg et al.: Immunity to citrullinated proteins in rheumatoid arthritis . In: Annual Review of Immunology , Vol. 26, 2008, pp. 651-675. doi:10.1146/annurev.immunol.26.021607.090244
- with A. C. Catrina & S. Paget: Rheumatoid arthritis (seminar). In: The Lancet , Volume 373, 2009 pp. 659-672 doi:10.1016/S0140-6736(09)60008-8
- with H. Mahdi et al.: Specific Interaction between genotype, smoking and autoimmunity to citrullinated alpha-enolase in the etiology of rheumatoid arthritis. In: Nature Genetics , Vol. 41, 2009, pp. 1319-1324 doi:10.1038/ng.480
- with S. Saevarsdottir et al.: Patients with early rheumatoid arthritis who smoke are less likely to respond to methotrexate and TNF inhibitors. Observations from the EIRA cohort and the Swedish Rheumatology Register . In: Arthritis & Rheumatism , January 2011. doi:10.1002/art.27758
- with L Mathsson, M Mullazehi, MC Wick, O Sjöberg, et al .: Antibodies against citrullinated vimentin in rheumatoid arthritis: Higher sensitivity and extended prognostic value concerning future radiographic progression as compared with cyclic citrullinated peptides. In: Arthritis Rheum, 2007, 58 (1), pp. 36-45 doi:10.1002/art.23188
