= Robert J. Winchester =

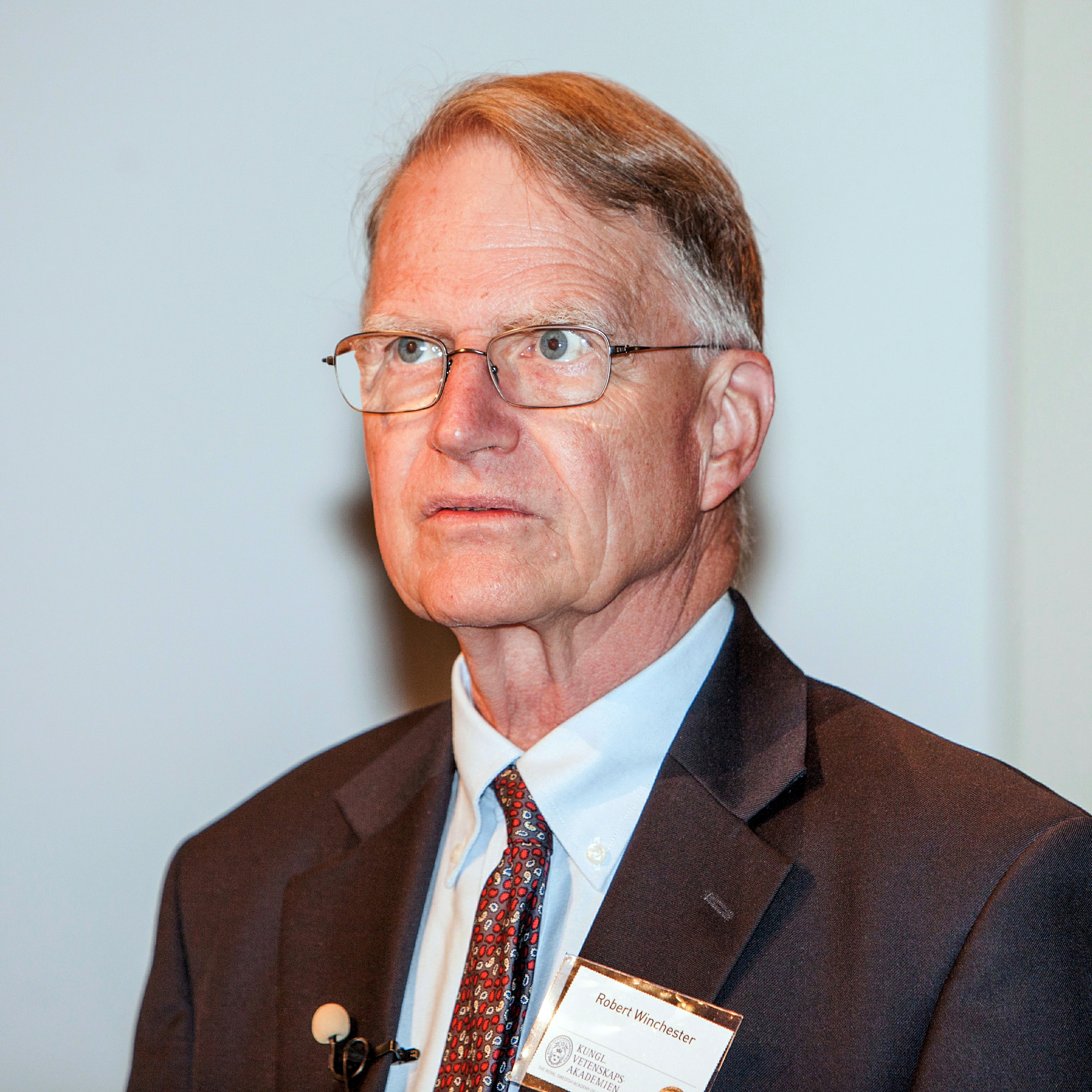
- Born: January 27, 1937 (age 89); Yonkers, New York, USA
- Education: Cornell University (MD)
- Known for: Research on genetic predisposition to rheumatoid arthritis and autoimmune diseases
- Awards: Crafoord Prize (2013)
- Scientific career
- Fields: Medicine; Rheumatology; Pathology
- Institutions: Rockefeller University; Mount Sinai School of Medicine; Columbia University

Robert J. Winchester (born January 27, 1937) is an American physician known for his research on the genetic predisposition to rheumatoid arthritis, systemic lupus erythematosus, and other autoimmune diseases.

== Education and Career ==
Winchester studied at Cornell University, earning his M.D. in 1963. He completed his internship and residency at New York Hospital-Cornell Medical Center and is board-certified in internal medicine and rheumatology.

From 1960 to 1979, Winchester was a professor at Rockefeller University, where he worked closely with Henry G. Kunkel, who had a significant influence on his career. From 1980 to 1986, he was a professor at the Mount Sinai School of Medicine. He is currently a professor of pediatrics, pathology, and medicine in the rheumatology department at Columbia University.

== Research ==
In the late 1980s, Winchester, along with Peter K. Gregersen, identified genes that increase the risk of rheumatoid arthritis. These genes encode specific Human Leukocyte Antigen (HLA) proteins in the major histocompatibility complex (MHC), which present antigens from pathogens to the immune system. Winchester and Gregersen discovered that a particular variation of these MHC molecules is associated with an increased susceptibility to rheumatoid arthritis.

== Awards and honors ==
- 2007: Excellence in Investigative Mentoring Award from the American College of Rheumatology
- 2013: Crafoord Prize in Polyarthritis Research (shared with Lars Klareskog and Peter K. Gregersen)
- 2017: Distinguished Basic Science Investigator Award from the American College of Rheumatology

He is a member of the American Association for the Advancement of Science.

== Publications ==
- With Gregersen, J. Silver: The shared epitope hypothesis: An approach to understanding the molecular genetics of susceptibility to rheumatoid arthritis. In: Arthritis & Rheumatism, 30, 1987, pp. 1205–1213.
- With Gregersen: The molecular basis of susceptibility to rheumatoid arthritis: the conformational equivalence hypothesis, Springer Seminar in Immunopathology, 10, 1988, pp. 119–139.
