= Dejusticia =

Non-profit legal organization in Colombia

- The Center for Law, Justice and Society
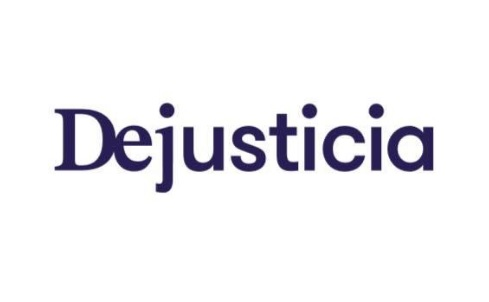
- Formation: 2005
- Location: Bogotá, Colombia, South America
- Coordinates: 4.62588°N 74.07563°W
- Key people: Diana Esther Guzmán Rodríguez (CEO)
- Awards: Tang Prize, Best Leaders Award Colombia
- Website: dejusticia.org

Dejusticia (also known as The Center for Law, Justice and Society) is a non-profit legal organization established in 2005 that promotes human rights and the social rule of law in Colombia, Latin America and other regions of the Global South.

The organization has been laurated, together with BELA and Legal Agenda, with the Tang Prize in Rule of Law in 2020.

== History ==
Dejusticia was founded in 2005 in Bogotá, Colombia by Colombian writer and columnist Mauricio García Villegas, Colombian lawyer and professor Helena Alviar Garcia, Colombian professor and jurist Rodrigo Uprimny, the university professor César Rodríguez Garavito, the Colombian lawyer and professor Catalina Botero and the academics Juan Fernando Jaramillo, Danilo Rojas and Diego E. López Medina. The organization consolidated its Editorial Dejusticia in 2009 and in 2016 its Litigation area under the General Management of Rodrigo uprimny.

The organization creates and provides academic papers and reports worldwide against in-justice, in-equality, Human Rights and other various social issues. And also helped marginalized communities through litigation efforts.

Dejusticia also organizes international seminars and produces working papers to promote discussions over ideas that support Human rights, Rule of Law, Legal Culture and Justice Crisis.

== Notable Cases ==
In 2007 Dejusticia supported the first collective titling of black communities in the Colombian Caribbean, the Rosario Islands.

At the end of 2012, Dejusticia filed a lawsuit for the election of the Ministers of Housing, Interior and Transportation because with their elections, former President Juan Manuel Santos breached Law 581 of 2000, which requires that at least 30% of the Ministries be headed by women.

On January 30, 2013, Dejusticia study center filed a lawsuit that focused on the decision that allowed Attorney Alejandro Ordóñez to remain in office. Three years later, that demand was answered by the Council of State, which removed the attorney Alejandro Ordóñez from the Office of the Inspector General of Colombia.

In 2016, in terms of environmental democracy, Dejusticia collaborated to advance a relevant precedent regarding environmental referendum, particularly in the Pijao case. The Pijao community filed a lawsuit that resulted in a historic ruling that gave communities a voice to exercise their rights in order to protect the environment and regulate land uses in their territories. An example of balance of powers within the extractivist sector of Colombia.

== Awards and honors ==
- Joint winner of the Tang Prize in Rule of Law, 2020
- Recognized by Colombia in the Best Leaders Award 2017 for achieving legal transformations

== Notable publications ==
- Mayorías sin democracia: Desequilibrio de poderes y Estado de derecho en Colombia; 2002-2009
- Justicia transicional sin transición? verdad, justicia y reparación para Colombia (2006), p;230
- Jueces sin estado. La justicia colombiana en zonas de conflicto armado (2008)
- Cortes y cambio social. Cómo la Corte Constitucional transformó el desplazamiento forzado en Colombia (2010)
- La adicción punitiva: la desproporción de leyes en América Latina (2012)
- Los territorios de la paz: La construcción del Estado local en Colombia
- Negociando desde los márgenes: La participación política de las mujeres en los procesos de paz de Colombia (1982-2016)
- Sistema de justicia territorial para la paz
- Coca, instituciones y desarrollo: Los retos de los municipios productores en el posacuerdo
- Voces desde el cocal: mujeres que construyen territorio
- Asesinatos a líderes sociales en Colombia en 2016–2017: una estimación del universo
- La profesión jurídica en Colombia. Falta de reglas y exceso de mercado
