= Helena Alviar Garcia =

Colombian legal academic

- Born: Colombia
- Occupations: Legal scholar, professor
- Known for: International law, transitional justice, social and economic rights, feminism, Latin American law and development

Academic background
- Education: Harvard University (S.J.D. and LL.M.); Universidad de los Andes (Law)

Helena Alviar Garcia is a Colombian S.J.D. from the Harvard Law School and served as full professor and dean of the Law School of Universidad de los Andes. She is a professor and researcher at the Sciences Po Law School.

She co-founded Dejusticia, a Tang Prize awardee for the rule of law.

== Academic career ==
Alviar-Garcia has taught courses on Property, Public law, legal theory, feminist theory, etcetera, and wrote/edited books and scholarly articles thereof.

Alviar-Garcia has been a visiting professor in universities in Latin America, Europe, and the United States, including Harvard Law School, University of Pennsylvania, Università di Torino, University of Miami, Universidad de Puerto Rico, and University of Wisconsin in Madison.

Alviar-Garcia was notably the Robert F. Kennedy Visiting Professor at Harvard in 2017, Bok Distinguished Visiting Professor at the Penn Law School in 2015, and Tinker Visiting Professor at UW-Madison in 2008.

== Major publications ==
=== Books ===
- Legal Experiments for Development in Latin America (2021). H Alviar Garcia, Taylor & Francis. ISBN 978-1-000-38699-8
- Authoritarian constitutionalism: Comparative Analysis and Critique (2019). H Alviar García, G Frankenberg, Edward Elgar Publishing. ISBN 978-1-78811-785-2
- Law and the new developmental state: the Brazilian experience in Latin American context (2013). DM Trubek, HA García, DR Coutinho, A Santos, Cambridge University Press. ISBN 978-1-107-34451-8
- Social and economic rights in theory and practice (2014). HA García, K Klare, LA Williams, Taylor & Francis. ISBN 978-1-317-96443-8
- Feminismo y crítica jurídica (2013). H Alviar García, IC Jaramillo Sierra. ISBN 978-958-665-797-6
- Nuevas tendencias del derecho administrativo (2016). Helena Alviar García. ISBN 978-958-35-1104-2
- Constitución y democracia en movimiento (2016). H Alviar Garcia, J Lemaitre Ripoll, B Perafán Liévano, Universidad de los Andes. ISBN 978-958-774-215-2

=== Select book chapters and journal articles ===
- Abogados de ficción: libros que hablan de derecho y el derecho en la literatura (2021). Alviar Garcia, Helena et al. (Eds. Ana María Ferreira, Lina M. Céspedes-Báez). ISBN 978-958-784-704-8
- Law and the new developmental state (2013). DM Trubek, H Alviar Garcia, DR Coutinho, A Santos, Cambridge University Press
- Searching for women and sustainable development in Colombia: Restructuring the limits (2012). H Alviar García, Fordham Environmental Law Review 23(2)
- Perspectivas de género en la educación superior: Una mirada latinoamericana (2020). Helena Alviar et al. (Eds. Isabel C. Jaramillo Sierra, Lina F. Buchely Ibarra). Editorial Universidad Icesi. ISBN 978-958-5590-57-1
- Feminismo y crítica jurídica. El análisis distributivo como alternativa crítica al legalismo liberal. Bogotá, Siglo del Hombre (2012). H Alviar García, IC Jaramillo Sierra. Barraza Morelle, C. & Gómez López, C.(2009) Un derecho para las mujeres: la despenalización parcial del aborto en Colombia. Bogotá, La Mesa por la Vida y la Salud de las Mujere (in Spanish). ISBN 978-958-665-797-6
- g New Tools (2017). H Alviar García, Law and Policy in Latin America: Transforming Institutions, and Rights, 77-93
- Leon Duguit´s influence in Colombia: the lost opportunity of a potentially progressive reform (2013). H ALviar García, Order from Transfer. Comparative Constitutional Design and Legal Culture. ISBN 978-1-78195-211-5

== Awards and recognition ==
- Fulbright Award of Excellence (2015)
