= Samuel Yin =

Taiwanese businessman (1950–2026)

Yin Yen-liang
- 尹衍樑
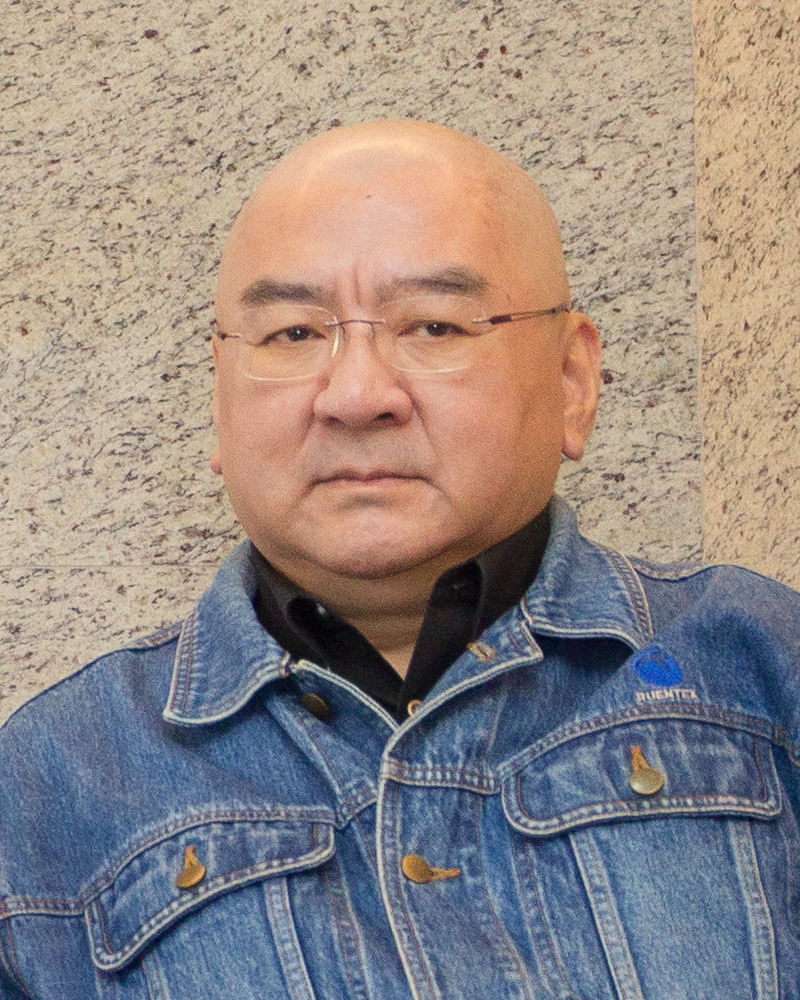
- Yin in 2015
- Born: 16 August 1950; Taipei, Taiwan
- Died: 26 May 2026 (aged 75); Taipei, Taiwan
- Education: Chinese Culture University (BA); National Taiwan University (MBA); National Chengchi University (PhD)
- Occupation: Businessman
- Known for: Founder, Tang Prize
- Title: Chairman, Ruentex Financial Group
- Spouse: Wang Chi-fan
- Children: 2

Yin Yen-liang (Chinese: 尹衍樑; pinyin: Yǐn Yǎnliáng; 16 August 1950 – 26 May 2026), also known by his English name Samuel Yin, was a Taiwanese billionaire businessman and philanthropist. He was best known for the establishment of the Tang Prize, and as chairman of the Ruentex Financial Group. Yin was also the president of the Guanghua School of Management at Peking University. In May 2026, Forbes estimated his net worth at US$5.6 billion.

== Early life and education ==
Yin was born on 16 August 1950 in Taipei, Taiwan. His father, Yin Shu-tien (尹書田), was a textile entrepreneur from Rizhao, Shandong, China, who had moved to Taiwan. His mother, Li Rongxin (李榮新), worked as a factory manager in the family's textile business. His parents jointly established Runhua Dyeing and Weaving Factory (潤華染織工廠), with his father soliciting orders on Taipei's Dihua Street and his mother overseeing factory operations, before establishing Ruentex Textiles (潤泰紡織). Yin was the family's sixth child. His mother was a devout Christian.

Yin was raised near his family's textile factory and developed an early interest in machinery. He experienced difficulties at school and attended six different junior high schools because of his involvement in fights. At age 14, he was sent to Jinde Middle School (進德中學), a correctional boarding school in Changhua County. During his time there, he was taught by Wang Jin-pyng, who later became president of the Legislative Yuan. According to Yin, his academic performance later improved from the lowest rank in his school to the highest. After leaving Jinde Middle School, he earned admission to the evening division of Cheng Kung Senior High School.

After high school, Yin graduated from Chinese Culture University with a bachelor's degree in history. He graduated at the bottom of his university class. He then failed his first attempt at the graduate entrance examination to study business administration at National Taiwan University, but gained admission after another year of preparation. In 1983, he earned a master's degree in business from the university. His master's thesis was titled, A Study of the Relationship Between Attitudes Toward Seeking Medical Care and Hospital Transfer Behavior (就醫態度與轉院行為關係之研究).

In 1988, Yin earned a Ph.D. in business administration from National Chengchi University. His doctoral dissertation was titled, A Study of the Effects of Organizational Change Strategies on Organizational Commitment: The Case of Computerization at Ruentex Industrial Co., Ltd. (組織變革策略對組織承諾之影響研究－以潤泰工業股份有限公司電腦化為例).

== Career ==
Yin was the head of the Ruentex Financial Group which invests in Taiwan and the People's Republic of China. Ruentex is most known for their construction investments as well as grocery, retail chain RT Mart.

In Taiwan and the PRC, he was recognized as a promoter of entrepreneurship and startups. In 2014, Yin was named as one of the key investors in Gogoro, an electric scooter startup in Taiwan.

In 2017, he sold a controlling stake in RT Mart China's parent company Sun Art Retail to Alibaba Group to focus on philanthropism.

In 2024, Yin invested USD 50 million Taiwanese EV company Gogoro.

== Philanthropy ==
Yin stated that he planned to donate 95% of his net wealth to charity, especially those relating to science, arts, law, and politics.

He established the Tang Prize in December 2012, funded by US$100 million of his own capital. The prize is touted as the Asian equivalent of the Nobel Prize. The mission of the prize is to promote research that is beneficial to the world and humankind, promote Chinese culture and make the world a better place. The prize pays out the equivalent of US$1.7 million in categories of sustainable development, biopharmaceutical science, sinology, and rule of law.

Yin also provided financial and leadership support for the following foundations in Taiwan and the PRC; the Yin Xun-Ruo Educational Foundation, the Yin Shu-Tien Medical Foundation, the Kwang-Hua Education Foundation, and the Guanghua School of Management of Peking University. In 2016, Yin donated US$12.8 million to the Scripps Research Institute to "contribute to the building of new state-of-the-art laboratories".

During the COVID-19 pandemic, Yin donated to the Taipei Veterans General Hospital to establish new laboratories, intensive care units and to acquire medical equipment. He also provided a donation for Vietnamese new anchor Lê Vân Đài Trang to give a partial liver transplant to her child at the same hospital.

== Personal life and death ==
Yin was married to Wang Chi-fan (王绮帆) and had one son and one daughter. His son, Yin Chung-yao is the chairman of Nan Shan Life Insurance and a director of various family companies including Ruentex Development and Gogoro.

He was an experienced offshore sailor and commissioned the construction of two yachts, Sea Eagle and Sea Eagle II, the latter being the world's largest aluminium sailing yacht.

Yin died at Taipei Veterans General Hospital on 26 May 2026, at the age of 75.

== Awards and honours ==
In 2004, Yin was named a fellow of the Chinese Institute of Civil and Hydraulic Engineering. In 2008, he was invited to join Russia's International Academy of Engineering and awarded the Engineering Prowess Medal, the academy's highest honour. In 2010, Yin received the Henry L. Michel Award for Industry Advancement of Research by the American Society of Civil Engineers (ASCE) for his contribution in the area of construction technology research. He was the first person without an academic background in engineering to receive the award.
