= Peter K. Gregersen =

American geneticist

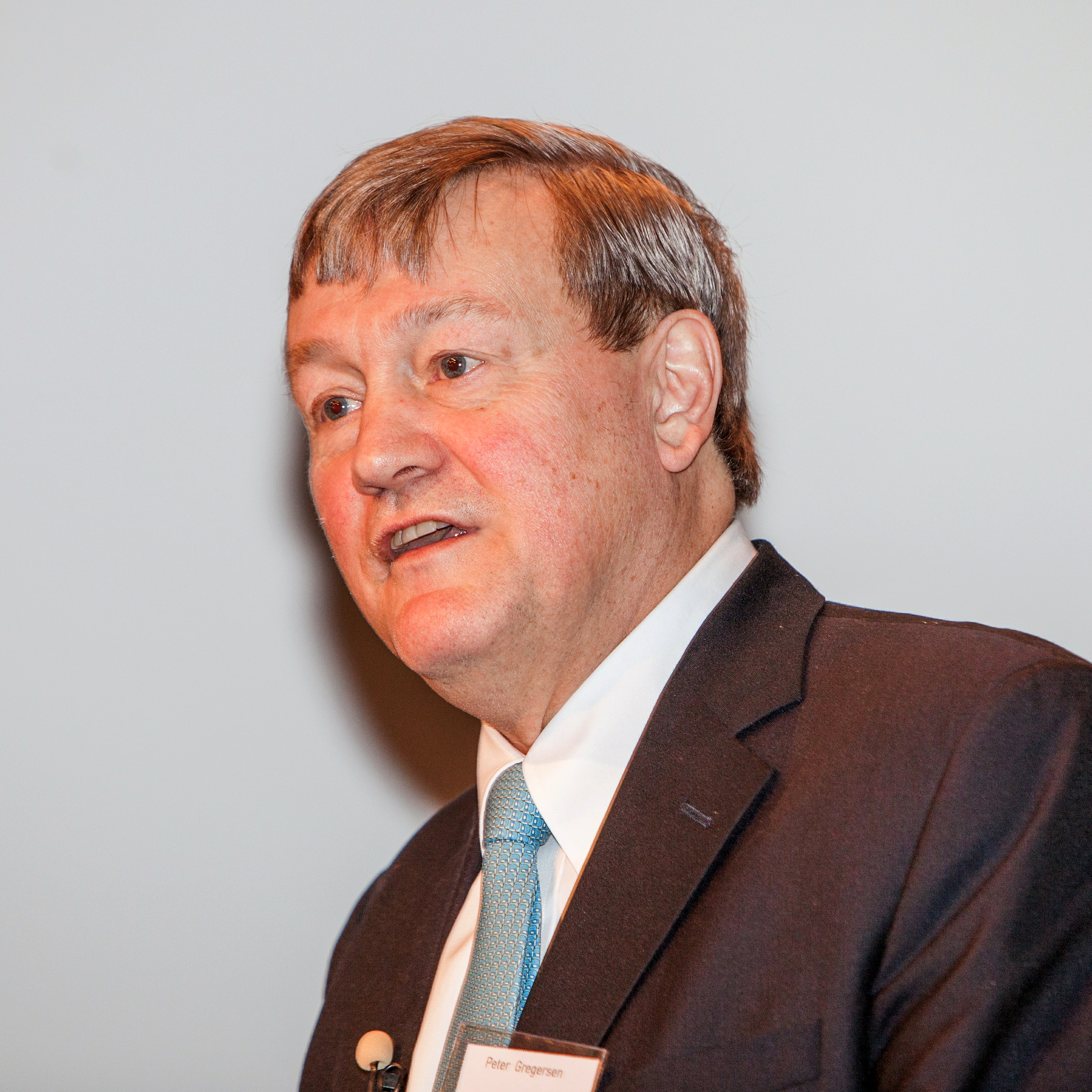
- Born: 1950 (age 75–76); United States
- Education: Columbia University (MD, 1976)
- Known for: Research on genetic susceptibility to rheumatoid arthritis and other autoimmune diseases
- Awards: Crafoord Prize (2013)
- Scientific career
- Fields: Genetics; Medicine; Rheumatology
- Institutions: Hofstra Northwell School of Medicine

Peter K. Gregersen (born 1950) is a geneticist who heads the Robert S. Boas Center for Genomics and Human Genetics at Northwell's Feinstein Institutes for Medical Research in Manhasset, New York, and is a professor of molecular medicine at Hofstra Northwell School of Medicine. He received his MD from Columbia University in 1976.

Gregersen and his team conduct genome-wide scans to identify polymorphisms that are associated with rheumatoid arthritis and other inflammatory conditions such as lupus and Myasthenia Gravis.

Along with Dr. Lars Klareskog and Robert J. Winchester, Gregersen, received the Royal Swedish Academy of Sciences's 2013 Crafoord Prize "for their discoveries concerning the role of different genetic factors and their interactions with environmental factors in the pathogenesis, diagnosis and clinical management of rheumatoid arthritis."

Gregersen leads the North American Rheumatology Consortium to collect, analyze and make available clinical and genetic data on 1,000 sibling pairs with rheumatoid arthritis.

== Awards ==
- 2007, American College of Rheumatology Distinguished Basic Investigator Award.
- 2013, Crafoord Prize.
