= David Nemazee =

American immunologist and professor

David Nemazee is an immunologist and professor at the Scripps Research Institute who studies self/non-self discrimination, germline-reverted broadly neutralizing antibodies for vaccine research, and B cell immune tolerance. For his work on the latter, he was awarded the 2025 Crafoord Prize in polyarthritis research.
