= James P. Allison =

American immunologist and Nobel laureate (born 1948)

James Allison
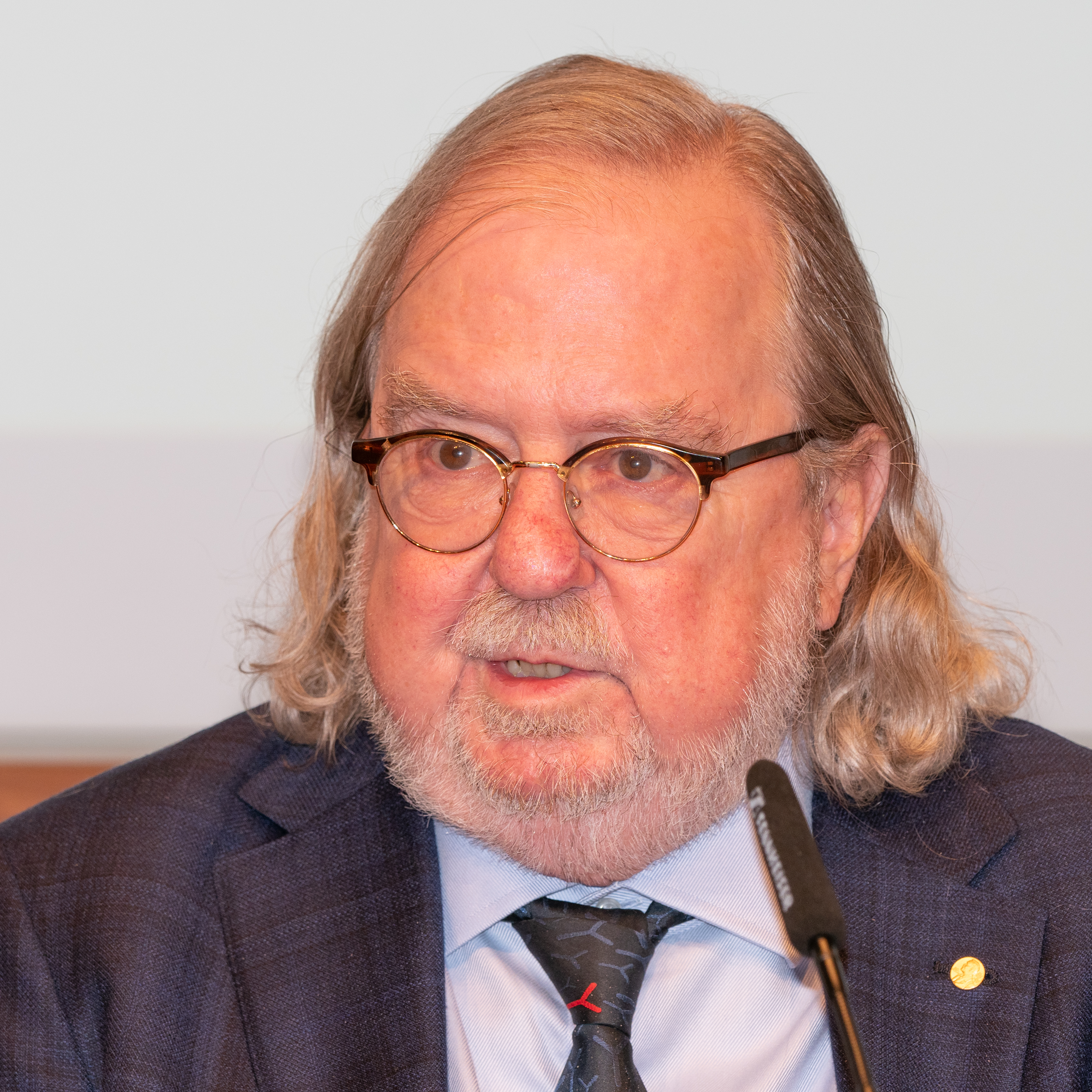
- Allison in 2018
- Born: James Patrick Allison; August 7, 1948 (age 78); Alice, Texas, U.S.
- Education: University of Texas, Austin (BS, MS, PhD)
- Known for: Cancer immunotherapy
- Spouses: Malinda Bell (m. 1969; div. 2012) Padmanee Sharma (m. 2014)
- Children: 1
- Awards: Breakthrough Prize in Life Sciences (2014); Massry Prize (2014); Tang Prize (2014); Louisa Gross Horwitz Prize (2014); Harvey Prize (2014); Gairdner Foundation International Award (2014); Paul Ehrlich and Ludwig Darmstaedter Prize (2015); Lasker-DeBakey Clinical Medical Research Award (2015); Wolf Prize (2017); Warren Alpert Foundation Prize(2017); Balzan Prize (2017); Sjöberg Prize (2017); King Faisal International Prize (2018); Albany Medical Center Prize (2018); Dr. Paul Janssen Award for Biomedical Research (2018); Nobel Prize in Physiology or Medicine (2018)
- Scientific career
- Fields: Immunology
- Workplaces: M. D. Anderson Cancer Center; Weill Cornell Medicine; University of California, Berkeley; University of California, San Francisco; University of Texas at Austin
- Thesis: Studies on bacterial asparaginases: I. Isolation and characterization of a tumor inhibitory asparaginase from Alcaligenes ?Eutrophus. II. Insolubilization of L-Asparaginase by covalent attachment to nylon tubing (1973)
- Doctoral advisor: Barrie Kitto

James Patrick Allison (born August 7, 1948) is an American immunologist and Nobel laureate who holds the position of professor and chair of immunology and executive director of immunotherapy platform at the MD Anderson Cancer Center in Houston, Texas. Allison is Regental Professor and Founding-Director of James P. Allison Institute at the MD Anderson Cancer Center.

His discoveries have led to new cancer treatments for the deadliest cancers. He is also the director of the Cancer Research Institute (CRI) scientific advisory council. He has a longstanding interest in mechanisms of T-cell development and activation, the development of novel strategies for tumor immunotherapy, and is recognized as one of the first people to isolate the T-cell antigen receptor complex protein.

In 2014, he was awarded the Breakthrough Prize in Life Sciences; in 2018, he shared the Nobel Prize in Physiology or Medicine with Tasuku Honjo.

== Early life ==
Allison was born on August 7, 1948, in Alice, Texas, the youngest of three sons of Constance Kalula (Lynn) and Albert Murphy Allison. He was inspired by his eighth-grade math teacher to pursue a career in science, spending a summer in a National Science Foundation–funded summer science-training program at the University of Texas, Austin, and completing high-school biology by correspondence course at Alice High School. Allison earned a Bachelor of Science degree in microbiology from the University of Texas, Austin, in 1969, where he was a member of Delta Kappa Epsilon fraternity.

"At the time, I was working on asparaginase. I felt that I had to do medically related research in order to avoid going to Vietnam because I was at the age of being drafted." - James P. Allison

He earned his doctor of philosophy degree in biological science in 1973, also from UT Austin, as a student of G. Barrie Kitto.

== Career ==
From 1974 to 1977, Allison worked as postdoctoral fellow at Scripps Clinic and Research Foundation in California. From 1977 to 1983, Allison worked as assistant biochemist and assistant professor at M D Anderson Research Division in Smithville, Texas. From 1983 to 1984, Allison worked as Associate biochemist and Associate professor at M D Anderson Research Division in Smithville, Texas. He was appointed a professor of immunology and director of the Cancer Research Laboratory at the University of California, Berkeley in 1985 and was concurrently appointed professor at the University of California, San Francisco from 1997.

In 2004, he moved to the Memorial Sloan-Kettering Cancer Center (MSKCC) in New York City to become the director of the Ludwig Center for Cancer Immunotherapy and the chair of the immunology program as well as the Koch chair in immunologic studies and attending immunologist at the Memorial Sloan-Kettering Cancer Center. He was a professor of Weill Cornell Medicine and co-chair of the Department of Graduate Program in Immunology and Microbial Pathogenesis at Weill Cornell Graduate School of Medical Sciences from 2004 to 2012, and also a Howard Hughes Medical Institute (HHMI) investigator until 2012, when he left to join the MD Anderson Cancer Center in 2012. Since 2012 he has been chair of immunology at MD Anderson Cancer Center.

He is a member of the National Academy of Sciences and the National Academy of Medicine (formerly Institute of Medicine), and is a fellow of the American Academy of Microbiology and the American Association for the Advancement of Science. He is director of the Cancer Research Institute scientific advisory council. Previously, he served as president of the American Association of Immunologists. He is on the Research Advisory Board of Candel Therapeutics and Lytix Biopharma.

Allison serves as a commentator in the Cancer documentary.

== Research ==
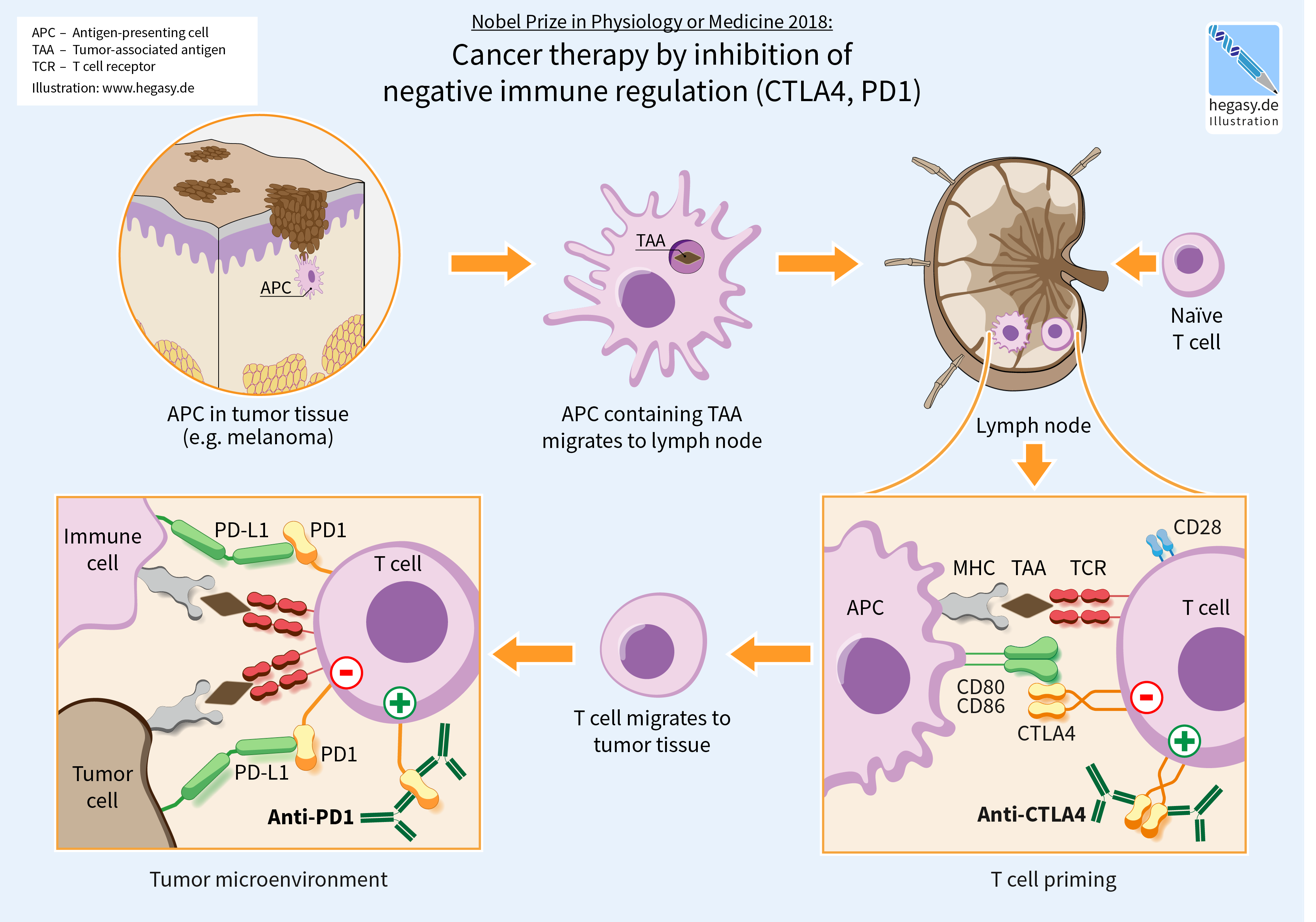
Cancer Therapy by Inhibition of Negative Immune Regulation (CTLA4, PD1)

Allison trained at Scripps Research under tumor-immunologist Ralph Reisfeld, Ph.D., professor emeritus, researching human leukocyte antigens (HLA) and T-cells and exploring the role HLA proteins play in enabling the immune system to distinguish self from invaders. In 1977, Allison and a colleague, G. N. Callahan, reported in a letter to Nature that they had found evidence that the immune system was prevented from attacking cancer cells due to antigens’ association with additional proteins. Finding the factors that inhibited the immune attack on cancer has been key to developing checkpoint-blockade cancer immunotherapies.

In 1982, Allison first discovered the T-cell receptor. Allison's research to elucidate mechanisms of T-cell responses was conducted in the 1990s at the University of California, Berkeley. In the early 1990s, he showed that CTLA-4 acts as an inhibitory molecule to restrict T-cell responses. In 1996, Allison was the first to show that antibody blockade of a T-cell inhibitory molecule (known as CTLA-4) could lead to enhanced anti-tumor immune responses and tumor rejection.

This concept of blocking T-cell inhibitory pathways as a way of unleashing anti-tumor immune responses and eliciting clinical benefit laid the foundation for the development of other drugs that target T-cell inhibitory pathways, which have been labeled as "immune checkpoint therapies". This work ultimately led to the clinical development of ipilimumab (Yervoy), which was approved in 2011 by the FDA for the treatment of metastatic melanoma.

Allison's research is in molecular immunology of the T-cell antigen receptor complex, co-stimulatory receptors, and other molecules involved in T-cell activation. He is particularly interested in finding signals that lead to differentiation of naive T-cells and also those that determine whether antigen receptor engagement will lead to functional activation or inactivation of T-cells. Once defined, the basic studies are used to develop new strategies for the treatment of autoimmune diseases and immunotherapy of cancer. Most recently he has been interested in understanding the immune responses in cancer patients who respond to immunotherapy. He established the immunotherapy platform at MD Anderson Cancer Center to study immune responses in cancer patients.

== Honors ==
According to a quantitative analysis, Allison was the top-ranking recipient of the most prestigious international science awards in the period 2010–2019, having received 13 of the top 40 such awards in any field of science.

In 2011 Allison won the Jacob Heskel Gabbay Award for Biotechnology and Medicine and was awarded the American Association of Immunologists Lifetime Achievement Award. In 2013 he shared the Novartis Prize for Clinical Immunology. In 2014 he shared the first Tang Prize in Biopharmaceutical Science with Tasuku Honjo, won the 9th Annual Szent-Györgyi Prize for Progress in Cancer Research of the National Foundation for Cancer Research, received the $3 million Breakthrough Prize in Life Sciences, the Canada Gairdner International Award, the Louisa Gross Horwitz Prize, the Massry Prize and the Harvey Prize of the Technion Institute of Technology in Haifa. In 2015, he received the Lasker-DeBakey Clinical Medical Research Award. and Paul Ehrlich and Ludwig Darmstaedter Prize.

In 2017 he received the Wolf Prize in Medicine, the Warren Alpert Foundation Prize and the Balzan Prize for Immunological Approaches in Cancer Therapy (this prize jointly with Robert D. Schreiber). In 2018 he received the King Faisal International Prize in Medicine, the Jessie Stevenson Kovalenko Medal and the Albany Medical Center Prize in Medicine and Biomedical Research.

He, along with Tasuku Honjo, was jointly awarded the Nobel Prize in Physiology or Medicine in 2018 for their discovery of cancer therapy by inhibition of negative immune regulation.

He is the subject of the 2019 documentary film "Jim Allison: Breakthrough" directed by Bill Haney. Allison received the Golden Plate Award of the American Academy of Achievement in 2019.

== Personal life ==
Allison married Malinda Bell in 1969. They have one son. They divorced in 2012. Allison met Padmanee Sharma in 2004. Allison and Sharma became collaborators and friends and married 10 years later in 2014. Allison is stepfather to her three children.

Allison's mother died of lymphoma when he was 10. His brother died of prostate cancer in 2005.

He plays the harmonica for a blues band of immunologists and oncologists called the Checkpoints. He also plays with a local band called the Checkmates.
