= Crafoord Prize =

Prize awarded by the Royal Swedish Academy of Sciences and the Crafoord Foundation

The Crafoord Prize
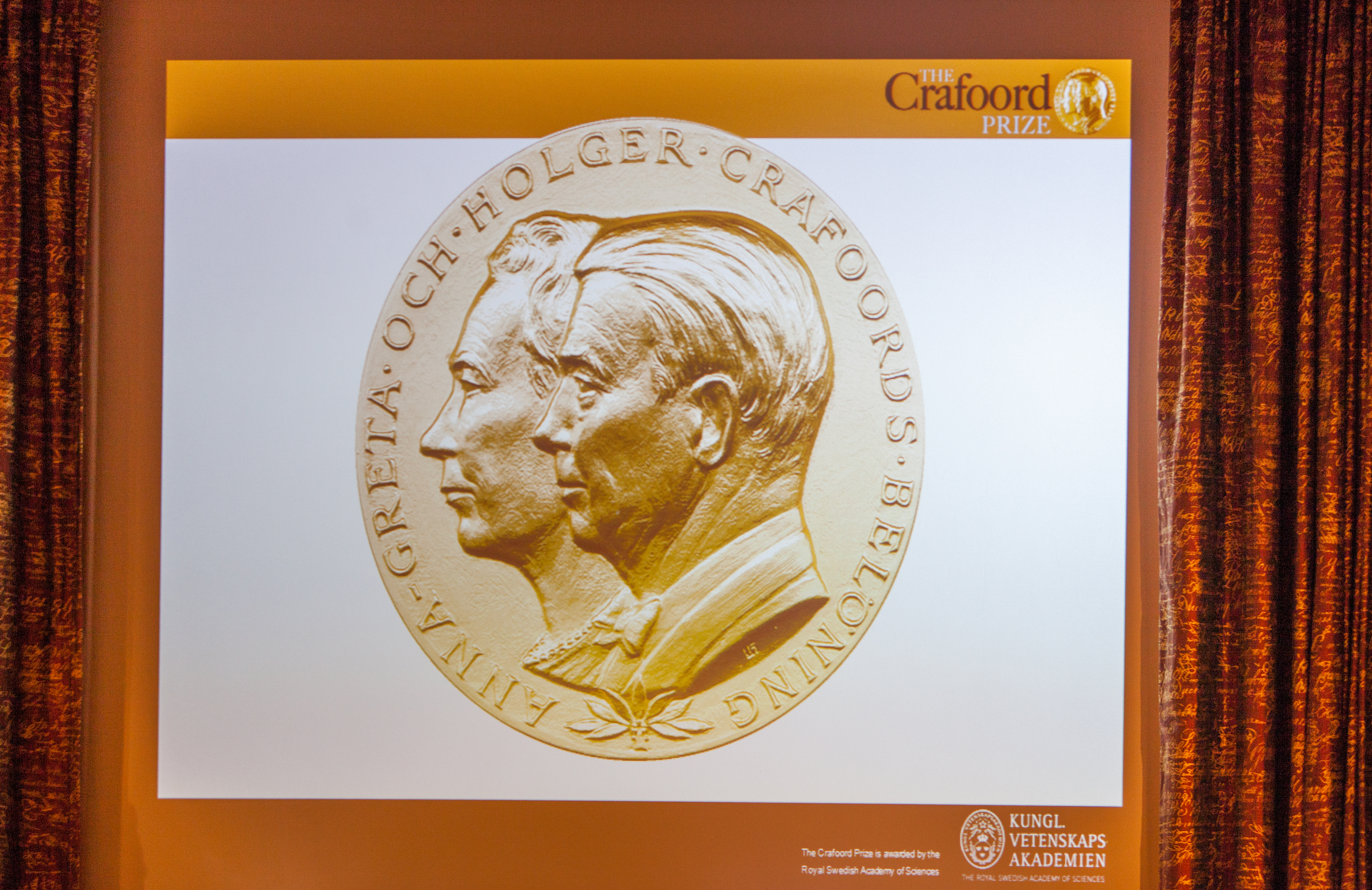
- Awarded for: astronomy and mathematics; biosciences; geosciences; polyarthritis research (in four-year rotation)
- Country: Sweden
- Presented by: Royal Swedish Academy of Sciences
- Reward: 8,000,000 Swedish kronor
- First award: 1982
- Website: crafoordprize.se

The Crafoord Prize (Swedish: Crafoordpriset) is an annual science prize established in 1980 by Holger Crafoord, a Swedish industrialist, and his wife Anna-Greta Crafoord following a donation to the Royal Swedish Academy of Sciences. It is awarded jointly by the academy and the Crafoord Foundation in Lund, with the former selecting the laureates. The Prize is awarded in four categories: mathematics and astronomy, geosciences, biosciences (with an emphasis on ecology) and polyarthritis, the final one because Holger suffered from severe rheumatoid arthritis in his later years.

The disciplines for which the Crafoord Prize is awarded are chosen so as to complement the Nobel Prizes. Only one award is given each year, according to a rotating scheme – astronomy and mathematics, then polyarthritis, geosciences and biosciences. Since 2012, the prizes in astronomy and mathematics are separate and awarded at the same time; prior to this, the disciplines alternated every cycle. The Crafoord Prize in polyarthritis was previously only awarded when a special committee decided that substantial progress in the field had been made.

The recipient of the Crafoord Prize is announced every year in mid-January and the prize is presented in April or May on "Crafoord Days", by a member of the Monarchy of Sweden. As of 2026, the prize money is 8,000,000 Swedish kronor (US$886,000).

The Prize is usually awarded to one recipient, but there can be as many as three. The inaugural laureates, Vladimir Arnold and Louis Nirenberg, were awarded the prize in 1982 for their work in the field of non-linear differential equations. Since then, the winners of the Prize have predominantly been men. The first woman to be awarded the Prize was astronomer Andrea Ghez in 2012.

== Laureates ==
Crafoord Prize laureates
Year	Category	Image	Laureate(s)	Rationale	Ref.
1982	Mathematics	Vladimir Arnold	Vladimir Arnold	“for their outstanding achievements in the theory of non-linear differential equations”	
1982	Mathematics	Louis Nirenberg	Louis Nirenberg	“for their outstanding achievements in the theory of non-linear differential equations”	
1983	Geosciences		Edward Norton Lorenz	“for their fundamental contributions to the field of geophysical hydrodynamics, which in a unique way have contributed to a deeper understanding of the large-scale motions of the atmosphere and the sea”	
1983	Geosciences	Henry Stommel	Henry Stommel	“for their fundamental contributions to the field of geophysical hydrodynamics, which in a unique way have contributed to a deeper understanding of the large-scale motions of the atmosphere and the sea”	
1984	Biosciences	Daniel Janzen	Daniel H. Janzen	“for his imaginative and stimulating studies on co-evolution which have inspired many researchers to further work in this field”	
1985	Astronomy	Lyman Spitzer	Lyman Spitzer	“for his fundamental pioneering studies of practically every aspect of the interstellar medium, culminating in the results obtained using the Copernicus satellite”	
1986	Geosciences	Claude Allègre	Claude Allègre	“for their pioneering studies of isotope geochemical relations and the geological interpretations that these results permit”	
1986	Geosciences	—	Gerald J. Wasserburg	“for their pioneering studies of isotope geochemical relations and the geological interpretations that these results permit”	
1987	Biosciences	—	Eugene Odum	“for their pioneering contributions within the field of ecosystem ecology”	
1987	Biosciences	—	Howard T. Odum	“for their pioneering contributions within the field of ecosystem ecology”	
1988	Mathematics	Pierre Deligne	Pierre Deligne	“for their fundamental research in algebraic geometry”	
1988	Mathematics	Alexander Grothendieck	Alexander Grothendieck (Note: Grothendieck declined the prize.)	“for their fundamental research in algebraic geometry”	
1989	Geosciences	James Van Allen	James Van Allen	“for his pioneering exploration of space, in particular the discovery of the energetic particles trapped in the geomagnetic field which forms the radiation belts - the Van Allen belts - around the planet Earth”	
1990	Biosciences	Paul R. Ehrlich	Paul R. Ehrlich	“for his research on the dynamics and genetics of fragmented populations and the importance of the distribution pattern for their survival probabilities”	
1990	Biosciences	Edward Osborne Wilson	E. O. Wilson	“for the theory of island biogeography and other research on species diversity and community dynamics on islands and in other habitats with differing degrees of isolation”	
1991	Astronomy		Allan Sandage	“for his very important contributions to the study of galaxies, their populations of stars, clusters and nebulae, their evolution, the velocity-distance relation (or Hubble relation), and its evolution over time”	
1992	Geosciences	—	Adolf Seilacher	“for his innovative research concerning the evolution of life in interaction with the environment as documented in the geological record”	
1993	Biosciences	—	W. D. Hamilton	“for his theories concerning kin selection and genetic relationship as a prerequisite for the evolution of altruistic behavior”	
1993	Biosciences	Seymour Benzer	Seymour Benzer	“for his pioneering genetical and neurophysiological studies on behavioural mutants in the fruit fly, Drosophila melanogaster”	
1994	Mathematics	Simon Donaldson	Simon Donaldson	"for his fundamental investigations in four-dimensional geometry through application of instantos in particular his new discovery of new differential invariants"	
1994	Mathematics	Shing-Tung Yau	Shing-Tung Yau	“for his development of non-linear techniques in differential geometry leading the solution of several outstanding problems”	
1995	Geosciences	—	Willi Dansgaard	“for their fundamental work on developing and applying isotope geological analysis methods for the study of climatic variations during the Quaternary period”	
1995	Geosciences	—	Nicholas Shackleton	“for their fundamental work on developing and applying isotope geological analysis methods for the study of climatic variations during the Quaternary period”	
1996	Biosciences	Robert May	Robert May	“for his pioneering ecological research concerning theoretical analysis of the dynamics of populations, communities and ecosystems”	
1997	Astronomy	Fred Hoyle	Fred Hoyle	“for their pioneering contributions to the study of nuclear processes in stars and stellar evolution”	
1997	Astronomy	—	Edwin Ernest Salpeter	“for their pioneering contributions to the study of nuclear processes in stars and stellar evolution”	
1998	Geosciences	Don L. Anderson	Don L. Anderson	“for their fundamental contributions to our knowledge of the structures and processes in the interior of the Earth”	
1998	Geosciences	Adam Dziewoński	Adam M. Dziewonski	“for their fundamental contributions to our knowledge of the structures and processes in the interior of the Earth”	
1999	Biosciences	Ernst Mayr	Ernst Mayr	“for their fundamental contributions to the conceptual development of evolutionary biology”	
1999	Biosciences	John Maynard Smith	John Maynard Smith	“for their fundamental contributions to the conceptual development of evolutionary biology”	
1999	Biosciences	—	George Christopher Williams	“for their fundamental contributions to the conceptual development of evolutionary biology”	
2000	Polyarthritis	—	Marc Feldmann	“for their definition of TNF-alpha as a therapeutic target in rheumatoid arthritis”	
2000	Polyarthritis	Ravinder N. Maini	Ravinder N. Maini	“for their definition of TNF-alpha as a therapeutic target in rheumatoid arthritis”	
2001	Mathematics	Alain Connes	Alain Connes	“for his penetrating work on the theory of operator algebras and for having been a founder of non-commutative geometry”	
2002	Geosciences	—	Dan McKenzie	“for fundamental contributions to the understanding of the dynamics of the lithosphere, particularly plate tectonics, sedimentary basin formation and mantle melting”	
2003	Biosciences	Carl Woese	Carl Woese	“for his discovery of a third domain of life”	
2004	Polyarthritis	—	Eugene C. Butcher	“for their studies of the molecular mechanisms involved in migration of white blood cells in health and disease”	
2004	Polyarthritis	—	Timothy A. Springer	“for their studies of the molecular mechanisms involved in migration of white blood cells in health and disease”	
2005	Astronomy	James E. Gunn	James E. Gunn	“for contributions towards understanding the large-scale structure of the Universe”	
2005	Astronomy	James Peebles	James Peebles	“for contributions towards understanding the large-scale structure of the Universe”	
2005	Astronomy	Martin Rees	Martin Rees	“for contributions towards understanding the large-scale structure of the Universe”	
2006	Geosciences	Wallace Smith Broecker	Wallace Smith Broecker	“for his innovative and pioneering research on the operation of the global carbon cycle within the ocean atmosphere-biosphere system, and its interaction with climate”	
2007	Biosciences	—	Robert Trivers	“for his fundamental analysis of social evolution, conflict and cooperation”	
2008	Astronomy	Rashid Sunyaev	Rashid Alievich Sunyaev	“for his decisive contributions to high energy astrophysics and cosmology, in particular processes and dynamics around black holes and neutron stars and demonstration of the diagnostic power of structures in the background radiation”	
2008	Mathematics	Maxim Kontsevich	Maxim Kontsevich	“for their important contributions to mathematics inspired by modern theoretical physics”	
2008	Mathematics	Edward Witten	Edward Witten	“for their important contributions to mathematics inspired by modern theoretical physics”	
2009	Polyarthritis	Charles Dinarello	Charles Dinarello	“for their pioneering work to isolate interleukins, determine their properties and explore their role in the onset of inflammatory diseases”	
2009	Polyarthritis	Tadamitsu Kishimoto	Tadamitsu Kishimoto	“for their pioneering work to isolate interleukins, determine their properties and explore their role in the onset of inflammatory diseases”	
2009	Polyarthritis	Toshio Hirano	Toshio Hirano	“for their pioneering work to isolate interleukins, determine their properties and explore their role in the onset of inflammatory diseases”	
2010	Geosciences	Walter Munk	Walter Munk	“for his pioneering and fundamental contributions to our understanding of ocean circulation, tides and waves, and their role in the Earth’s dynamics”	
2011	Biosciences	Ilkka Hanski	Ilkka Hanski	"for his pioneering studies on how spatial variation affects the dynamics of animal and plant populations"	
2012	Astronomy	Reinhard Genzel	Reinhard Genzel	"for their observations of the stars orbiting the galactic centre, indicating the presence of a supermassive black hole"	
2012	Astronomy	Andrea Ghez	Andrea M. Ghez	"for their observations of the stars orbiting the galactic centre, indicating the presence of a supermassive black hole"	
2012	Mathematics	Jean Bourgain	Jean Bourgain	"for their brilliant and groundbreaking work in harmonic analysis, partial differential equations, ergodic theory, number theory, combinatorics, functional analysis and theoretical computer science"	
2012	Mathematics	Terence Tao	Terence Tao	"for their brilliant and groundbreaking work in harmonic analysis, partial differential equations, ergodic theory, number theory, combinatorics, functional analysis and theoretical computer science"	
2013	Polyarthritis	Peter K. Gregersen	Peter K. Gregersen	"for their discoveries concerning the role of different genetic factors and their interactions with environmental factors in the pathogenesis, diagnosis and clinical management of rheumatoid arthritis"	
2013	Polyarthritis	Lars Klareskog	Lars Klareskog	"for their discoveries concerning the role of different genetic factors and their interactions with environmental factors in the pathogenesis, diagnosis and clinical management of rheumatoid arthritis"	
2013	Polyarthritis	Robert J. Winchester	Robert J. Winchester	"for their discoveries concerning the role of different genetic factors and their interactions with environmental factors in the pathogenesis, diagnosis and clinical management of rheumatoid arthritis"	
2014	Geosciences	—	Peter Molnar	"for his ground-breaking contribution to the understanding of global tectonics, in particular the deformation of continents and the structure and evolution of mountain ranges, as well as the impact of tectonic processes on ocean-atmosphere circulation and climate"	
2015	Biosciences	—	Richard Lewontin	"for their pioneering analyses and fundamental contributions to the understanding of genetic polymorphism"	
2015	Biosciences	Tomoko Ohta	Tomoko Ohta	"for their pioneering analyses and fundamental contributions to the understanding of genetic polymorphism"	
2016	Astronomy	Roy Kerr	Roy Kerr	"for fundamental work concerning rotating black holes and their astrophysical consequences"	
2016	Astronomy	Roger Blandford	Roger Blandford	"for fundamental work concerning rotating black holes and their astrophysical consequences"	
2016	Mathematics	Yakov Eliashberg	Yakov Eliashberg	"for the development of contact and symplectic topology and groundbreaking discoveries of rigidity and flexibility phenomena"	
2017	Polyarthritis	Shimon Sakaguchi	Shimon Sakaguchi	"for their discoveries relating to regulatory T cells, which counteract harmful immune reactions in arthritis and other autoimmune diseases"	
2017	Polyarthritis		Fred Ramsdell	"for their discoveries relating to regulatory T cells, which counteract harmful immune reactions in arthritis and other autoimmune diseases"	
2017	Polyarthritis	Alexander Rudensky	Alexander Rudensky	"for their discoveries relating to regulatory T cells, which counteract harmful immune reactions in arthritis and other autoimmune diseases"	
2018	Geosciences	Syukuro Manabe	Syukuro Manabe	"for fundamental contributions to understanding the role of atmospheric trace gases in Earth’s climate system"	
2018	Geosciences	Susan Solomon	Susan Solomon	"for fundamental contributions to understanding the role of atmospheric trace gases in Earth’s climate system"	
2019	Biosciences	Sallie W. Chisholm	Sallie W. Chisholm	"for the discovery and pioneering studies of the most abundant photosynthesising organism on Earth, Prochlorococcus"	
2020	Astronomy	Eugene N. Parker	Eugene N. Parker	"for pioneering and fundamental studies of the solar wind and magnetic fields from stellar to galactic scales"	
2020	Mathematics	Enrico Bombieri	Enrico Bombieri	"for outstanding and influential contributions in all the major areas of mathematics, particularly number theory, analysis and algebraic geometry"	
2021	Polyarthritis	Daniel Kastner	Daniel L. Kastner	"for establishing the concept of autoinflammatory diseases"	
2022	Geosciences	Andrew K. Knoll	Andrew H. Knoll	"for fundamental contributions to our understanding of the first three billion years of life on Earth and life’s interactions with the physical environment through time"	
2023	Biosciences	—	Dolph Schluter	"for fundamental contributions to the understanding of adaptive radiation and ecological speciation"	
2024	Astronomy	—	Douglas Gough	"for developing the methods of asteroseismology and their application to the study of the interior of the Sun and of other stars"	
2024	Astronomy	Jørgen Christensen-Dalsgaard	Jørgen Christensen-Dalsgaard	"for developing the methods of asteroseismology and their application to the study of the interior of the Sun and of other stars"	
2024	Astronomy	Conny Aerts	Conny Aerts	"for developing the methods of asteroseismology and their application to the study of the interior of the Sun and of other stars"	
2024	Mathematics	Claire Voisin	Claire Voisin	"for outstanding contributions to complex and algebraic geometry, including Hodge theory, algebraic cycles, and hyperkähler geometry"	
2025	Polyarthritis	—	Christopher Goodnow	"for the discovery of fundamental mechanisms for B cell tolerance."	
2025	Polyarthritis	—	David Nemazee	"for the discovery of fundamental mechanisms for B cell tolerance."	
2026	Geosciences	—	Veerabhadran Ramanathan	"for fundamental contributions to our understanding of how aerosol particles and other climate pollutants influence the atmospheric energy balance and the Earth system."	

== See also ==
- List of general science and technology awards
- List of prizes known as the Nobel or the highest honors of a field#Geosciences, agricultural sciences and environmental sciences
- Prizes named after people
