= Jürg Tschopp =

Swiss biochemist (1951–2011)

Jürg Tschopp (born 1951 in Basel — died 22 March 2011 in the Swiss Alps) was a Swiss biochemist, known for his research on apoptosis and the immunology of inflammation. His greatest achievement was perhaps his team's discovery and scientific description of the inflammasome (which he named).

== Biography ==
Tschopp studied chemistry with his 1974 Diplom thesis supervised by Joachim Seelig at the Biozentrum University of Basel. There Tschopp received in 1979 his doctorate in biophysics under the supervision of Jürgen Engel. As a postdoc Tschopp was supervised by Hans J. Müller-Eberhard at the Scripps Research Institute in La Jolla. There with colleagues he showed "that the lytic pore of complement was formed by C9 multimers." At the University of Lausanne, Tschopp became an assistant professor in 1982, an associate professor in 1987, and a full professor in 1990 in the biochemistry department. Since 2003 he was a co-director of the biochemistry department.

He and his colleagues discovered "viral and mammalian forms of the caspase-8-related protein FLIP" (FLICE-Like Inhibitory Protein, where "FLICE" is an alias for caspase-8). They elucidated the molecular mechanisms of caspase-8's involvement in cell death processes and in nonapoptotic signalling pathways. In 2000 he with 9 co-workers published their discovery "that, similar to apoptosis, caspase-independent cell death (necroptosis) was a tightly controlled cell biological process that was dependent on the kinase RIP1."

He was involved in the discovery of B-cell activating factor (BAFF), also known as B Lymphocyte Stimulator (BLyS), a cytokine that stimulates the reproduction of B cells. This led to the development of a new drug, Belimumab, approved by the FDA in 2011 for systemic lupus erythematosus.

Tschopp's group, and other groups, established that mutations in the gene for the protein NLRP3, also known as cryopyrin, (one of the proteins forming the inflammasome) cause cryopyrin-associated periodic syndrome (CAPS), which is a group of rare autoimmune disorders. Patients with CAPS are "now successfully treated with IL-1 antagonists such as anakinra or blocking antibodies."

In 2005, Tschopp with six colleagues described the function of a "novel cytoplasmic protein complex" involving what is now known as Mitochondrial Antiviral-signaling protein (MAVS), also known as CARDIF or Cardif.

He died of a heart attack on a ski trip with his son in the Swiss Alps. In his youth he was nationally ranked in the decathlon and was later active in hiking, running, and skiing.

When Tschopp died he had an h-index of 105. He was the author or co-author of more than 350 publications. He was the co-editor with Gillian M. Griffiths of the 1995 book Pathways for Cytolysis. Tschopp received several awards, including the European Cell Death Organization's Career Award in 2006, the Louis-Jeantet Prize for Medicine in 2008, and the Novartis Prize for Clinical Immunology (shared with Charles Dinarello) in 2010.

== Selected publications ==
- Tschopp, J.; Müller-Eberhard, H. J.; Podack, E. R. (1982). "Formation of transmembrane tubules by spontaneous polymerization of the hydrophilic complement protein C9". Nature. 298 (5874): 534–538. Bibcode:1982Natur.298..534T. doi:10.1038/298534a0. PMID 7099251. S2CID 4310786.
- Tschopp, J.; Masson, D.; Stanley, K. K. (1986). "Structural/Functional similarity between proteins involved in complement- and cytotoxic T-lymphocyte-mediated cytolysis". Nature. 322 (6082): 831–834. Bibcode:1986Natur.322..831T. doi:10.1038/322831a0. PMID 2427956. S2CID 4330219.
- Hahne, M.; Rimoldi, D.; Schröter, M.; Romero, P.; Schreier, M.; French, L. E.; Schneider, P.; Bornand, T.; Fontana, A.; Lienard, D.; Cerottini, J.; Tschopp, J. (1996). "Melanoma cell expression of Fas(Apo-1/CD95) ligand: Implications for tumor immune escape". Science. 274 (5291): 1363–1366. Bibcode:1996Sci...274.1363H. doi:10.1126/science.274.5291.1363. PMID 8910274. S2CID 24139146.
- Irmler, Martin; Thome, Margot; Hahne, Michael; Schneider, Pascal; Hofmann, Kay; Steiner, Véronique; Bodmer, Jean-Luc; Schröter, Michael; Burns, Kim; Mattmann, Chantal; Rimoldi, Donata; French, Lars E.; Tschopp, Jürg (1997). "Inhibition of death receptor signals by cellular FLIP". Nature. 388 (6638): 190–195. Bibcode:1997Natur.388..190I. doi:10.1038/40657. PMID 9217161. S2CID 4341495.
- Schneider, Pascal; MacKay, Fabienne; Steiner, Véronique; Hofmann, Kay; Bodmer, Jean-Luc; Holler, Nils; Ambrose, Christine; Lawton, Pornsri; Bixler, Sarah; Acha-Orbea, Hans; Valmori, Danila; Romero, Pedro; Werner-Favre, Christiane; Zubler, Rudolph H.; Browning, Jeffrey L.; Tschopp, Jürg (1999). "BAFF, a Novel Ligand of the Tumor Necrosis Factor Family, Stimulates B Cell Growth". Journal of Experimental Medicine. 189 (11): 1747–1756. doi:10.1084/jem.189.11.1747. PMC 2193079. PMID 10359578.
- Mackay, Fabienne; Woodcock, Stephen A.; Lawton, Pornsri; Ambrose, Christine; Baetscher, Manfred; Schneider, Pascal; Tschopp, Jurg; Browning, Jeffrey L. (1999). "Mice Transgenic for BAFF Develop Lymphocytic Disorders along with Autoimmune Manifestations". Journal of Experimental Medicine. 190 (11): 1697–1710. doi:10.1084/jem.190.11.1697. PMC 2195729. PMID 10587360.
- Holler, N.; Zaru, R.; Micheau, O.; Thome, M.; Attinger, A.; Valitutti, S.; Bodmer, J. L.; Schneider, P.; Seed, B.; Tschopp, J. (2000). "Fas triggers an alternative, caspase-8-independent cell death pathway using the kinase RIP as effector molecule". Nature Immunology. 1 (6): 489–495. doi:10.1038/82732. PMID 11101870. S2CID 13515758.
- Martinon, Fabio; Burns, Kimberly; Tschopp, Jürg (2002). "The Inflammasome". Molecular Cell. 10 (2): 417–426. doi:10.1016/S1097-2765(02)00599-3. PMID 12191486.
- Meylan, Etienne; Curran, Joseph; Hofmann, Kay; Moradpour, Darius; Binder, Marco; Bartenschlager, Ralf; Tschopp, Jürg (2005). "Cardif is an adaptor protein in the RIG-I antiviral pathway and is targeted by hepatitis C virus" (PDF). Nature. 437 (7062): 1167–1172. Bibcode:2005Natur.437.1167M. doi:10.1038/nature04193. PMID 16177806. S2CID 4391603.
- Martinon, F.; Pétrilli, V.; Mayor, A.; Tardivel, A.; Tschopp, J. (2006). "Gout-associated uric acid crystals activate the NALP3 inflammasome". Nature. 440 (7081): 237–241. Bibcode:2006Natur.440..237M. doi:10.1038/nature04516. PMID 16407889. S2CID 2692522.
