= Padmanee Sharma =

American immunologist

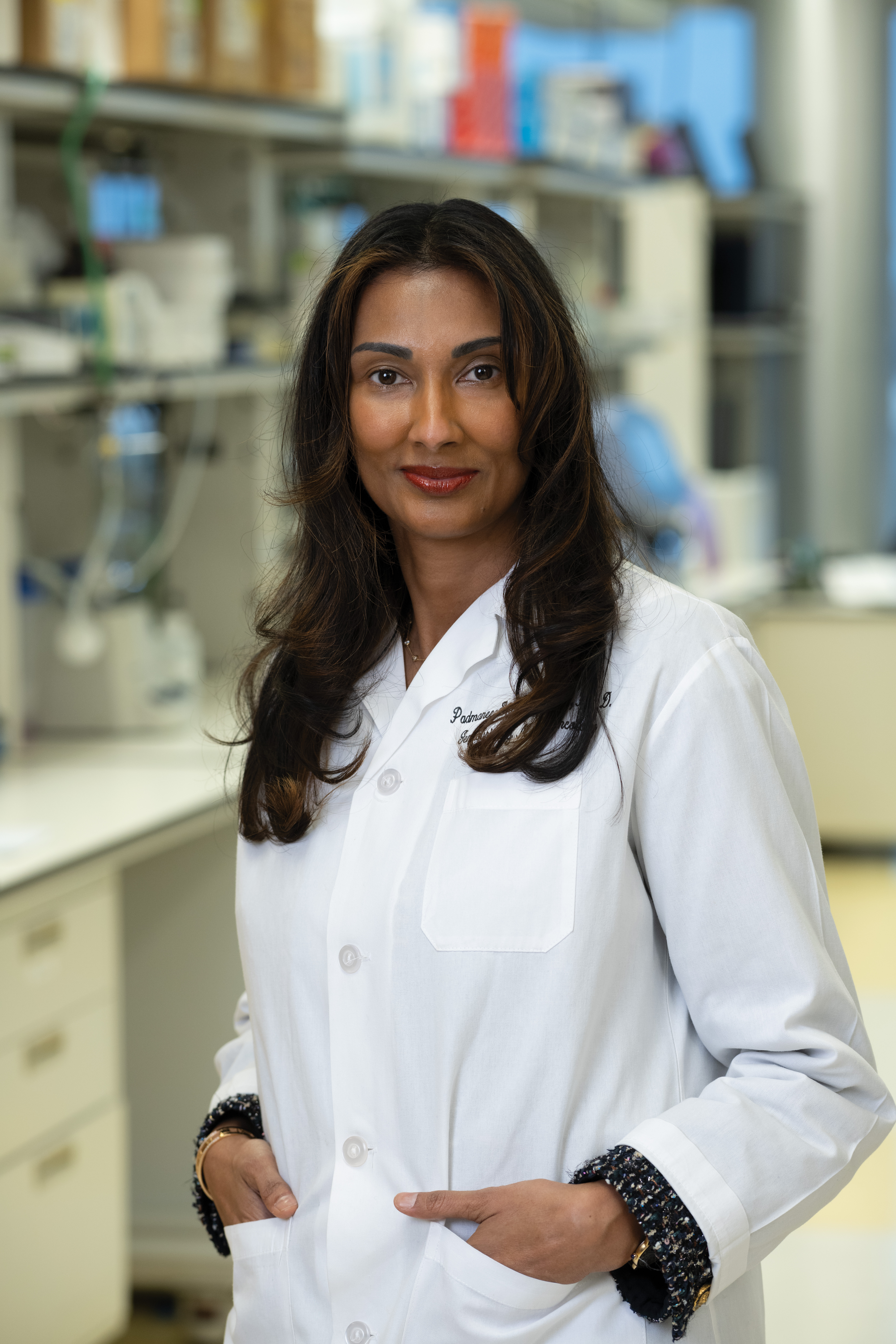
Dr. Padmanee Sharma, Head of James P. Allison Institute and Vice-President of Immunobiology, Scientific Director of Immunotherapy Platform at MD Anderson Cancer Center

Padmanee Sharma (born June 26, 1970) is an immunologist and oncologist at the University of Texas MD Anderson Cancer Center in Houston, Texas. She is the T.C. and Jeanette Hsu Endowed Chair in Cell Biology and professor of genitourinary medical oncology and immunology in the Division of Cancer Medicine where she specializes in renal, prostate, and bladder cancers. Sharma is currently Director of Scientific Programs for the James P. Allison Institute at MD Anderson Cancer Center; the inaugural Scientific Director of the Immunotherapy Platform, and Co-Director of Parker Institute for Cancer Immunotherapy at M. D. Anderson Cancer Center.

== Research ==
Sharma's research focuses on cancer immunotherapy and the mechanisms that determine responses to immune checkpoint blockade.

Early in her career, Sharma investigated cancer-testis antigens, including NY-ESO-1, as targets for cancer immunotherapy and characterized their expression in urothelial carcinoma. She subsequently studied immune responses to NY-ESO-1 vaccination

More recently, Sharma's research has focused on identifying biomarkers and immune mechanisms associated with responses to immune checkpoint blockade. Her studies have reported that TET2-mutated clonal hematopoiesis is associated with enhanced antitumor immune responses and improved clinical outcomes in several solid tumors treated with immune checkpoint inhibitors. Her group has studied immune correlates of response and resistance to checkpoint blockade, including prostate cancer studies of the bone tumor microenvironment and pan-tumor analyses of immunologic signatures associated with nivolumab and ipilimumab treatment.

== Education ==
- BA, Biology: Boston University (1990)
- MA, Biotechnology: Boston University (1991)
- MD, Medicine: Pennsylvania State University, Hershey, PA (1998)
- PhD, Immunology: Pennsylvania State University, Hershey, PA (1998)
- Clinical Residency in Internal Medicine: Cornell Medical Center-New York Hospital (2000)
- Clinical Fellowship in Medical Oncology: Memorial Sloan Kettering Cancer Center (2004)

== Honors ==
- 2021 Jack and Beverly Randall Prize for Excellence in Cancer Research
- 2021 Heath Memorial Award
- 2020 Women in Science with Excellence (WISE) Award
- 2018 Pandolfi Award for Women in Cancer Research
- 2018 William B. Coley Award for Distinguished Research in Tumor Immunology
- 2008 Prostate Cancer Foundation Challenge Award
- 2003 ASCO Young Investigator Award
- 2002 Doris Duke Clinical Scientist Development Award

== Personal life ==
Sharma was born June 26, 1970, in Guyana. She is married to longtime collaborator, James P. Allison and has three daughters from a previous marriage.
