= Tadamitsu Kishimoto =

Japanese immunologist (born 1939)

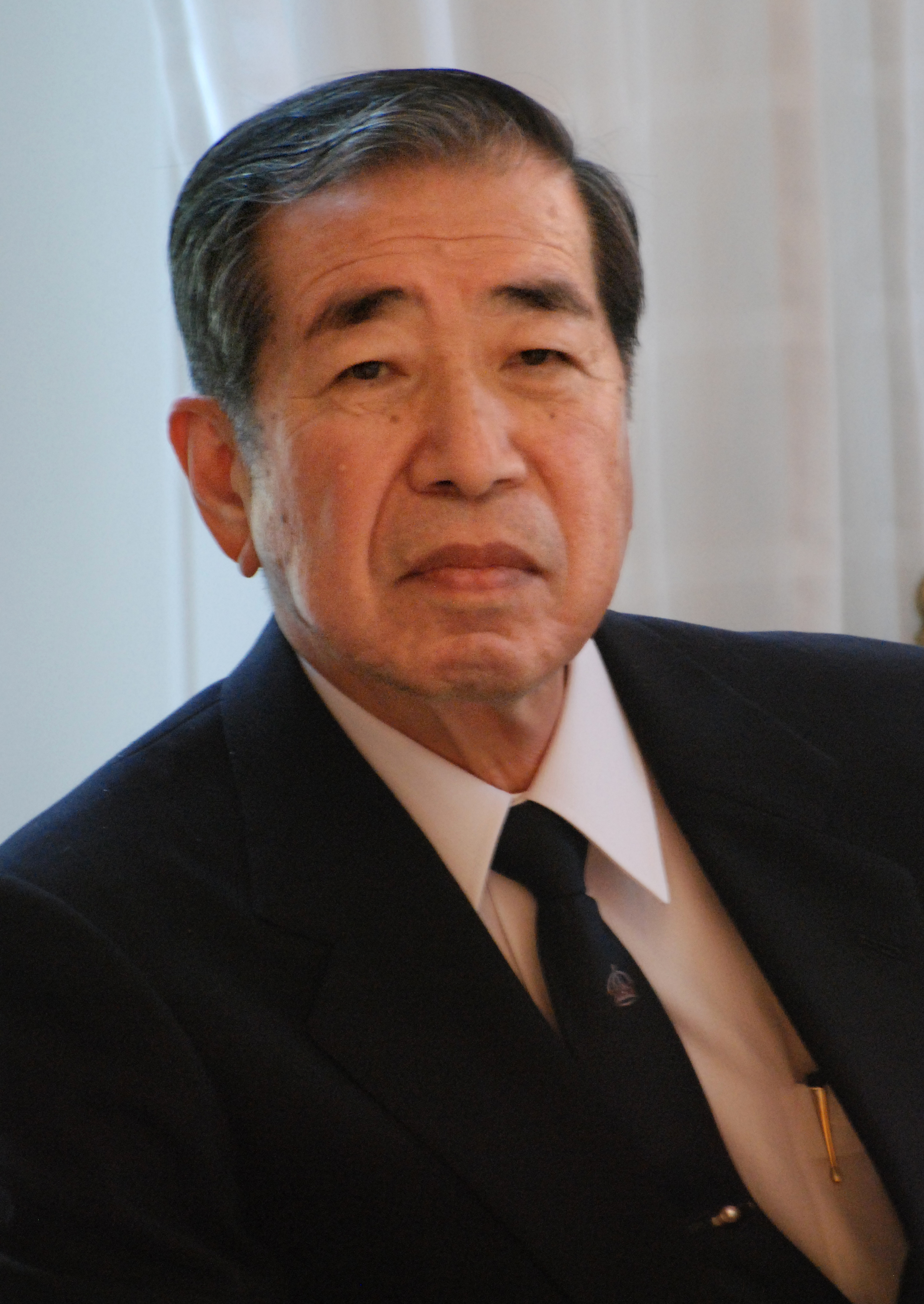
- Born: May 7, 1939 (age 84); Tondabayashi, Osaka, Japan
- Education: Osaka University
- Known for: Interleukin 6
- Awards: Imperial Prize (1992); Robert Koch Gold Medal (2003); Crafoord Prize (2009); Japan Prize (2011); King Faisal International Prize (2017); Keio Medical Science Prize (2019); Tang Prize (2020); Clarivate Citation Laureates (2021)
- Scientific career
- Fields: Biology

Tadamitsu Kishimoto (岸本 忠三, Kishimoto Tadamitsu; born May 7, 1939 in Tondabayashi, Osaka) is a Japanese immunologist known for research on IgM and cytokines, most famously, interleukin 6.

Kishimoto did postdoctoral work under Kimishige Ishizaka, the discoverer of IgE at Johns Hopkins University. He is listed by the Institute for Scientific Information (ISI) as a highly cited biologist and he is also in the top ten of h-index of living biologists.

== Life ==
Tadamitsu Kishimoto, who was born in Osaka in 1939, was President of Osaka University from 1997 to 2003 and a Member, Council for Science and Technology Policy, Cabinet office from 2004 to 2006. He is now Professor, Graduate School of Frontier Biosciences, Osaka University. He was Dean, Professor and Chairman of Department of Medicine at Osaka University Medical School from which he graduated in 1964. He is currently Japan's leading scientist in the field of life science, specifically in immunology and has made fundamental contributions to the understanding of cytokine functions through series of his studies on IL-6, its receptor system, and transcription factors. He has developed anti-IL6 receptor therapy for several immune disorders including Castleman's disease, rheumatoid arthritis and juvenile idiopathic arthritis.

He has received numerous awards, including the Imperial Prize of the Japan Academy in 1992, the Sandoz Prize for Immunology from the International Union of Immunological Society in 1992 and the Avery-Landsteiner Prize from the German Immunology Society in 1996. In 1998, he was awarded the Order of Culture from Emperor. He was awarded Robert Koch Gold Medal in 2003, Honorary Life Time Achievement Awards from International Cytokine Society in 2006 and the Crafoord Award from the Royal Swedish Academy of Sciences in 2009. He has been elected a Foreign Associate of the US National Academy of Sciences in 1991, a member of the Japan Academy in 1995 and a member of German Academy of Sciences Leopoldina in 2005. He served as a president of the International Immunopharmacology Society, International Cytokine Society and the Japanese Immunology Society. He is an honorary member in American Association of Immunologists and American Society of Hematology. In 2020, He received the prestigious Tang Prize in Biopharmaceutical Science.

== IL-6 ==
In the early 1970s, Kishimoto discovered the activity inducing antibody production in culture supernatants of T cells. Furthermore, he demonstrated that the activity for inducing IgG and IgE antibodies could be separated. Later, this finding led to the discovery of the dichotomy of helper T cells, Th1 and Th2. On the basis of these early studies, Kishimoto discovered and cloned interleukin-6 and its receptor and delineated the signaling pathway used by IL-6 and the set of related cytokines that utilize gp-130, which he also discovered. He identified the transcription factors NF-IL-6 and STAT3, both central to the action of IL-6. He further discovered a family of suppressors of cytokine signaling, the SOCS molecules, that are key regulators of cytokine function. He demonstrated the involvement of IL-6 in the pathogenesis of cardiac myxomas, multiple myeloma, Castleman’s disease, rheumatoid arthritis, Crohn's disease and juvenile idiopathic arthritis (JIA). He identified IL-6 as a hepatocyte stimulating factor which induces acute phase reactions. He prepared a monoclonal anti-IL-6 receptor antibody that was subsequently humanized and has been shown to be of great therapeutic value in a series of autoinflammatory diseases including Castleman's Disease, rheumatoid arthritis and juvenile idiopathic arthritis. His work has dominated the field of proinflammatory cytokines and has established paradigms for the study of all of cytokine biology, ranging from discovery of the cytokine and its receptor, through signaling and transcriptional mechanisms, to the utilization of such knowledge to develop highly effective therapeutics. A series of his IL-6 studies for 35 years since 1973 have been highly appreciated; He was ranked as the world’s 8th-most-cited researchers between 1983 and 2002 and he is in the top ten of h-index of living biologists.

== Recognition ==
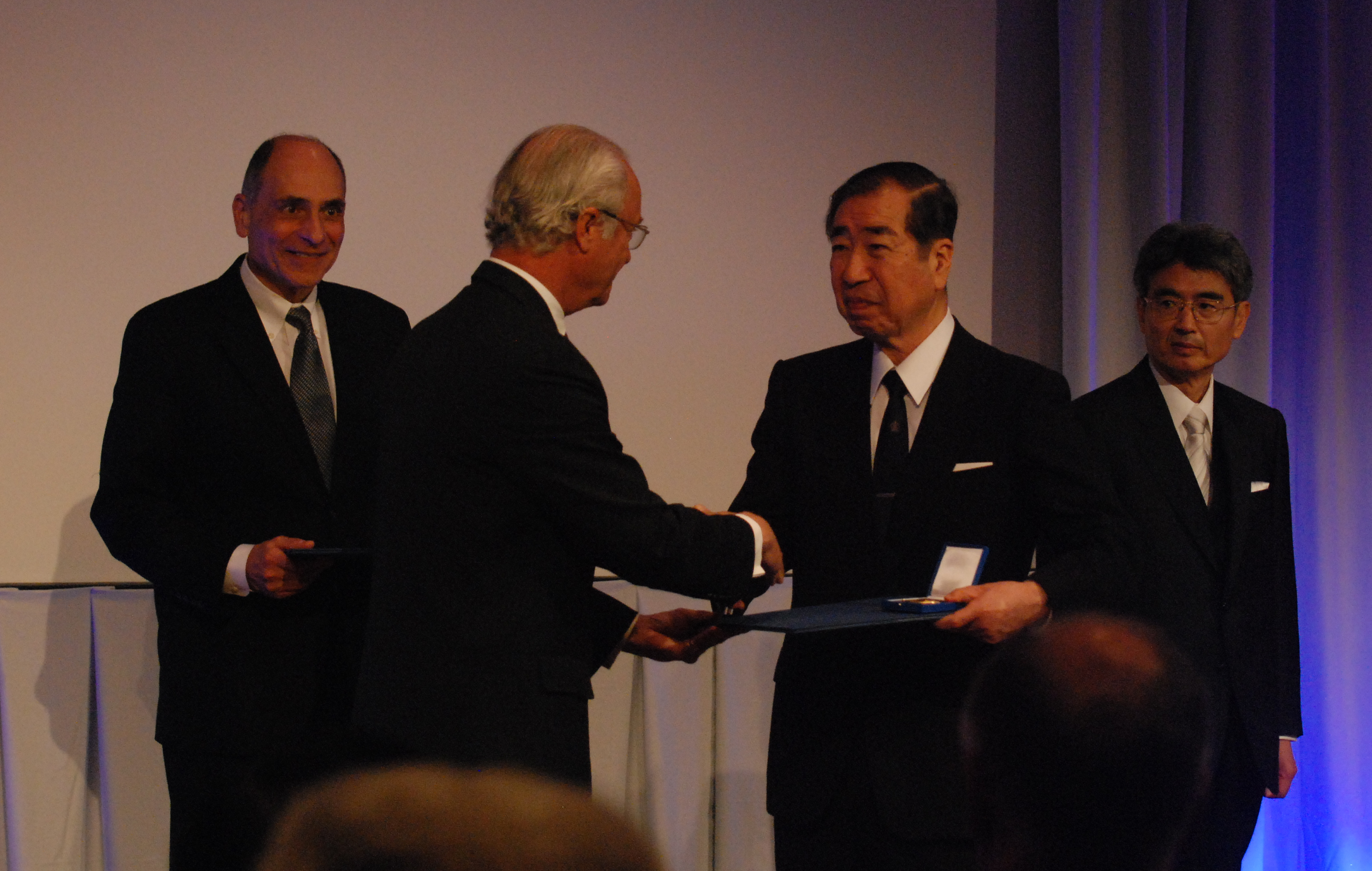
Kishimoto receives the Crafoord Prize

=== Awards ===
- Behring-Kitasato Prize from Hoechst Japan, 1982
- Osaka Science Prize, 1983
- Erwin von Bälz Prize, 1986
- Takeda Prize, 1988
- Asahi Prize, 1988
- Prize of The Japanese Medical Association, 1990
- Scientific Achievement Award from the International Association of Allergology and Clinical Immunology, 1991
- Imperial Prize of the Japan Academy, 1992
- Sandoz Prize for Immunology from International Union of Immunology Society, 1992
- The Avery-Landsteiner Prize from the German Immunology Society, 1996
- The Donald Seldin Award from the International Society of Nephrology, 1999
- ISI Citation Laureate Award, 2000
- Robert Koch Prize - Robert Koch Gold Medal, 2003
- Honorary Lifetime Achievement Awards, International Cytokine Society, 2006
- 7th International Award of the Japan Rheumatism Foundation, 2008
- The Crafoord Prize from the Royal Swedish Academy of Sciences, 2009
- Japan Prize, 2011
- King Faisal International Prize, 2017
- Asian Scientist 100, Asian Scientist, 2018, 2020, 2021
- Tang Prize in Biopharmaceutical Science, 2020
- Clarivate Citation Laureates, 2021

=== Honors ===
- Person of Cultural Merit, Japan 1990
- Foreign Associate, The US National Academy of Sciences, 1991
- Honorary Member, the American Association of Immunologists, 1992
- Honorary Citizen, Tondabayashi City, 1992
- Member, the Japan Academy, 1995
- Foreign Associate member, the Institute of Medicine of the National Academy of Science, USA, 1997
- Honorary member, the American Society of Hematology, 1997
- The Order of Culture of Japan, 1998
- Doctor Honoris Causa, Universidad Technologica de Santiago, UTESA, 2001
- Honorary Member, International Association of Dental Research, 2001
- Honorary Professor, the Fourth Military Medical University, Xi’an, China, 2002
- Honorary Member, World Innovation Foundation, 2002
- Doctor of Science, Honoris Causa, Mahidol University, 2003
- Clemens von Pirquet Distinguished Professor, Medicine and Immunology, University California, Davis, 2004
- Member, German Academy of Sciences Leopoldina, 2005
