= Cancer dormancy =

Stage in cancer progression

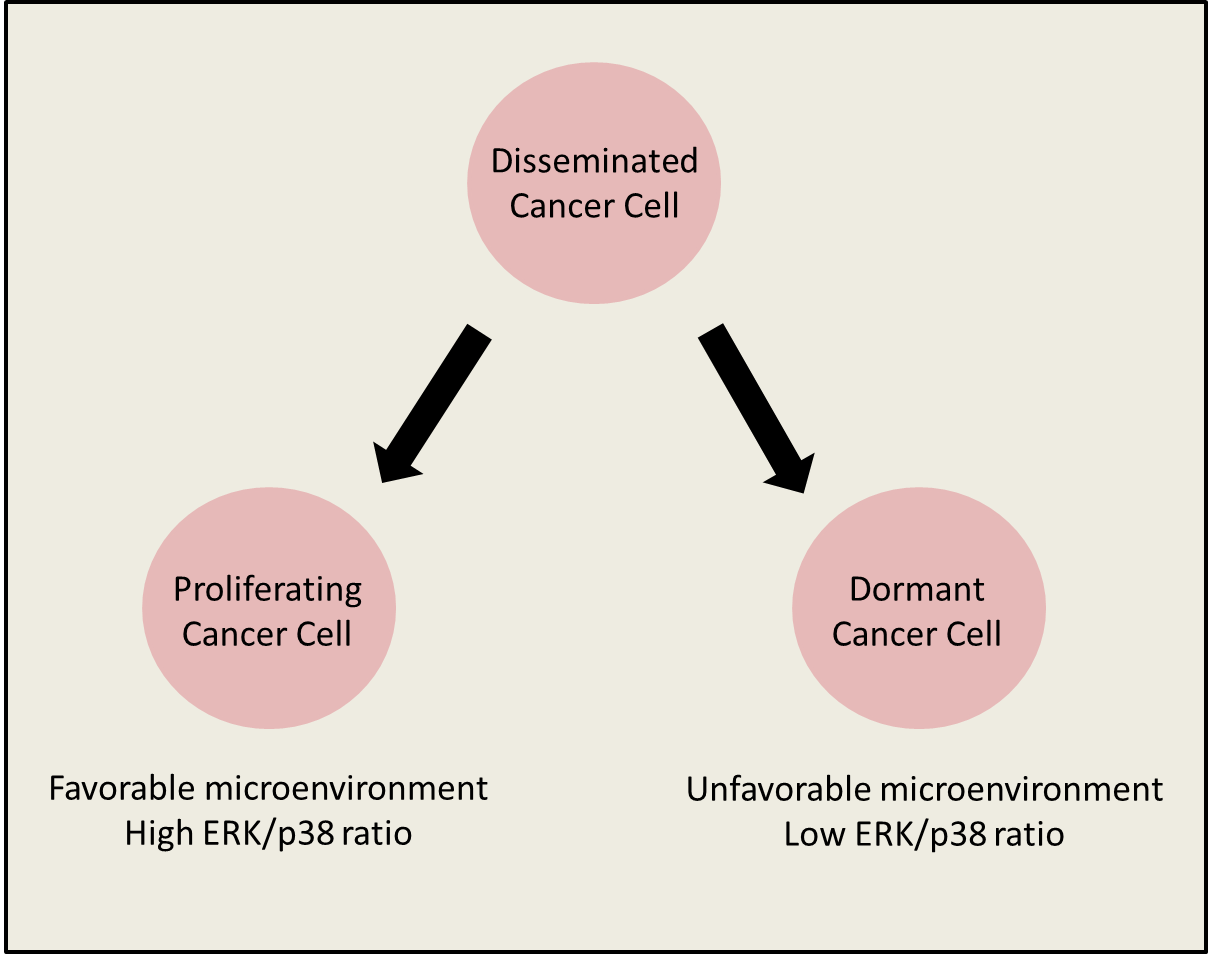
Disseminating cancer cells can proliferate or become dormant depending on the microenvironment and factors such as the ERK/p38 ratio.

Dormancy is a stage in cancer progression where the cells cease dividing but survive in a quiescent state while waiting for appropriate environmental conditions to begin proliferation again. Quiescence is the state where cells are not dividing but at arrest in the cell cycle in G0-G1. Dormant cancer cells are thought to be present in early tumor progression, in micrometastases, or left behind in minimal residual disease (MRD) after what was thought to be a successful treatment of the primary tumor.

== Mechanism ==
=== Occurrence in cancer ===
Cancer dormancy is not yet fully understood, but some researchers have performed mathematical modeling to explain the occurrence of cancer dormancy as a characteristic of all migrating tumor cells as part of an evolutionary process of selection and mutation. Recently, scientists from Aga Khan University Pakistan, have extended the studies of encystation in Acanthamoeba to induce dormancy in Prostate cancer cells lines and understanding of the signalling pathways that are involved. This eukaryotic encystation in Acanthamoeba spp., is known to involve a crosstalk between the trophozoite form of the cell and unfavourable microenvironment that induces it. It is thought that once tumor cells disseminate and begin to migrate to a new site to metastasize, the interaction of the tumor cells with that microenvironment determines whether the cells will proliferate and form metastases or undergo growth arrest and enter cancer dormancy. It is suggested that the disseminated cells choose dormancy when the new environment is not permissive in situations such as cellular stress or a lack of available growth factors. These dormant cells can stay in this state for long periods of time and can be clinically undetectable. However, these cells can be dangerous because they can strike back years after the doctor and patient believe the patient is cured. They can exist in a quiescent state for many years, but the dormancy period can be interrupted to start proliferating uncontrollably and form metastases that cannot be treated. Cancer dormancy is often associated with minimal residual disease (MRD) where some tumor cells are left behind after a treatment and can persist either at the primary tumor site or as disseminated cells that are proliferating or dormant. MRD has been found in a widespread range of cancers including but not limited to: breast, prostate, colon, gastric, colon, pancreatic, head and neck, neuroblastoma, leukemia, melanoma, and others. These cells are often found in the bone marrow, but are also found in other organs and usually indicate poor prognosis for the patient.

One model dubbed DINOMIT (Disjunction, Initiation, Natural selection, Overgrowth, Metastasis, Involution, Transition), proposed by researchers at the Moores Cancer Center at the University of California, San Diego, has vitamin D and calcium in adequate levels playing a crucial role in potentially preventing the onset of cancer (Disjunction) as well as allowing a developed cancer to enter and stay in a weak or fully dormant state (Involution and Transition stages). "It is projected that raising the minimum year-around serum 25(OH)D level to 40 to 60 ng/mL (100–150 nmol/L) would prevent approximately 58,000 new cases of breast cancer and 49,000 new cases of colorectal cancer each year, and three fourths of deaths from these diseases in the United States and Canada, based on observational studies combined with a randomized trial." July 2009 Volume 19, Issue 7, Pages 468–483; Vitamin D for Cancer Prevention: Global Perspective; Cedric F. Garland, Dr PH, FACE, Edward D. Gorham, MPH, Sharif B. Mohr, MPH, Frank C. Garland, PhD.

=== Types of cancer dormancy ===
Cancer dormancy can refer to two different types: tumor mass dormancy and cellular dormancy.

1. In tumor mass dormancy, the tumor mass will continue to divide until it is physically limited by size, does not have access to the blood supply, or the immune system acts on it. Here the cells are not completely inactive, but they cannot expand and sit in a balance between proliferation and apoptosis. An emerging Hippo (Hpo) signaling pathway is thought to be responsible for controlling organ size, cell contact inhibition, and tumorigenesis by stopping cell proliferation and promoting cell death. Tumor mass dormancy is also often associated with angiogenic dormancy. This occurs when tumors enter a hypoxic state because they cannot get to blood vessels. If the number of cells still proliferating is balanced by the number dying from no blood supply, the tumor sits in angiogenic dormancy.
2. Cellular dormancy refers to the cell entering a state of quiescence where growth is arrested in G0-G1 of the cell cycle, and cells are truly inactive and asymptomatic. This is referred to as the dormancy that tumor cells enter when they survive dissemination but cannot adapt immediately to stresses or the new microenvironment. Recently, model pathogenic eukaryotic cell encystation has been linked to cancer cell dormancy, Acanthamoeba spp. were studied for conditions leading to their encystation. These conditions were imposed on prostate cancer cells to induce a state of dormancy from which they could be revived by elimination of the provoking stimuli. Dormant cells might also have different mechanisms that can be used to evade an immune response.

=== Signaling pathways ===
Although the mechanism of signaling in cancer dormancy is also poorly understood, there is evidence of many different signaling pathways that are involved in the switch between proliferation and dormancy. The signaling most likely comes from the microenvironment. The switch seems to be mediated by interactions between surface receptors such as uPAR and integrins, mitogenic signaling from the Ras-extracellular signal-regulated kinase (ERK) pathway, and stress induced signaling from the p38 pathway. One example that has been extensively researched is the balance between the ERK pathway and p38 pathway. The ERK pathway has a major role in many cellular processes, but in cancer dormancy it is thought to be involved in mitogenic signaling that results in heightened proliferation. The p38 pathway is thought to be involved in cell cycle arrest and induction of apoptosis. Thus, a higher ERK/p38 ratio usually indicates proliferation and a lower ratio causes dormancy.

== Clinical and therapeutic importance ==
The push for understanding the mechanism of cancer dormancy is important for several clinical reasons. These dormant cancer cells are often untreatable due to drug resistance. These cells are usually resistant to chemotherapy because they are not dividing, and chemotherapy best targets rapidly diving cells.

1. An idea for a therapeutic strategy is to cause cancer cells to be induced or maintained in a dormant state. By inducing normally untreatable malignant cells into growth arrest, the patient would be able to survive in a chronic asymptomatic condition. This could be accomplished by finding the correct ratio of mitogenic signals like ERK to p38. However, even though a cell can remain dormant for a long period of time, there is always the risk of interrupted dormancy leading to metastasis by even the smallest change in a signaling network. Another therapeutic strategy is to develop methods to knock out dormant cells completely.
2. By targeting the mechanisms behind dormant cell survival and how they acquire drug resistance, it might be possible to induce these dormant cells to their death.
3. Finally, it is hoped that understanding the mechanism of dormancy will allow researchers to find potential markers of dormancy that might contribute to determining the prognosis of the patient.

== Remaining questions ==
There are many questions that remain to be answered in the quest for understanding cancer dormancy more fully. Some of these include:

- What is the actual cause of awakening dormant cancer cells?
- How closely similar are dormant cancer cells and cancer stem cells?
- Is the mechanism of cancer dormancy different for different types of cancer?
- Do all long-term cancer survivors that are free of relapse also have dormant cancer cells hidden somewhere?

Finally, it is important for scientists to use models that can more accurately model the stage of cancer dormancy to discover its mechanism. By more fully understanding the mechanism of cancer dormancy, it will be possible to find new therapeutic strategies to target these dormant cancer cells. It might be that the body is not completely rid of cancer cells in the way that might be considered "cured" by complete elimination, but it is an alternative "operational cure" by which the patient is in control of a chronic disease so that they will eventually die with their cancer instead of from it.
