= Tang Prize =

International award

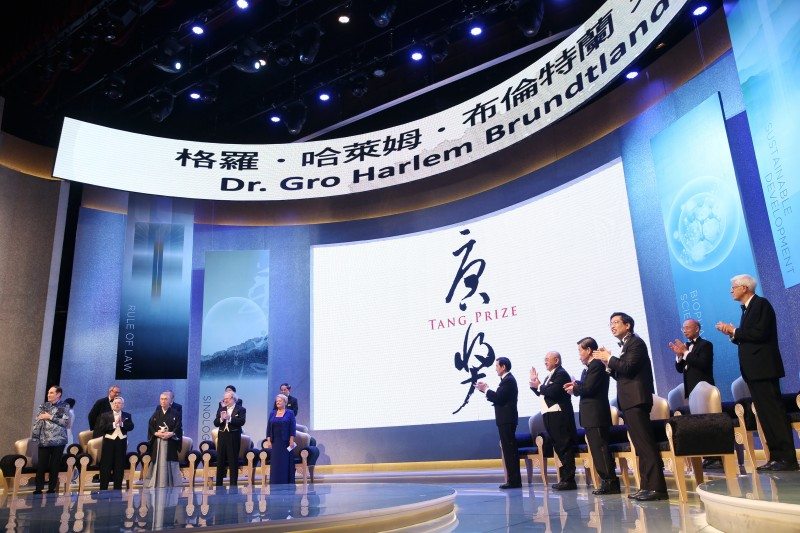
- Award ceremony for the first Tang Prize
- Awarded for: Outstanding contributions in sustainable development, biopharmaceutical science, sinology, and rule of law
- Country: Taiwan
- Presented by: The Tang Prize Foundation
- First award: 2014
- Website: www.tang-prize.org

The Tang Prize (Chinese: 唐獎) is a set of Taiwanese biennial international awards bestowed in four fields: Sustainable Development, Biopharmaceutical Science, Sinology, and Rule of Law. Nomination and selection are conducted by an independent selection committee, which is formed in partial cooperation with the Academia Sinica, Taiwan's national research institution. It is awarded every two years, and is among the most lucrative academic prizes in the world, with a cash grant exceeding US$1.4 million.

== Philosophy ==
Taiwanese billionaire entrepreneur Samuel Yin announced the creation of the Tang Prizes in January 2013, aiming to "encourage individuals across the globe to chart the middle path to sustainable development".

Samuel Yin admired Alfred Nobel and was inspired by him to use NT$3 billion to establish the Tang Prize. This would continue the spirit of the Nobel Prize, with the Tang Prize covering four areas not explicitly stated by the Nobel Prize, encouraging more important research beneficial to the planet and humanity, and promoting Chinese culture. Yin had also announced that he would donate 95% of his wealth to charity.

With the aim to recognize and support contributors for their revolutionary efforts in the research fields critical to the 21st century, the Tang Prize is global in reach. Laureates are selected on the basis of the originality of their work along with their contributions to society, irrespective of gender, religion, ethnicity, or nationality.

== Award categories ==
The award categories of the Tang Prize include Sustainable Development, Biopharmaceutical Science, Sinology, and Rule of Law.

The Prize in Sustainable Development recognizes those who have made extraordinary contributions to the sustainable development of human societies, especially through groundbreaking innovations in science and technology.

The Prize in Biopharmaceutical Science recognizes original biopharmaceutical or biomedical research that has led to significant advances towards preventing, diagnosing and/or treating major human diseases to improve human health.

The Prize in Sinology recognizes the study of Sinology in its broadest sense, awarding research on China and its related fields, such as Chinese thought, history, philology, linguistics, archaeology, philosophy, religion, traditional canons, literature, and art (excluding literary and art works). Honoring innovations in the field of Sinology, the Prize showcases Chinese culture and its contributions to the development of human civilization.

The Prize in Rule of Law recognizes individual(s) or institution(s) who have made significant contributions to the rule of law, reflected not only in the achievement of the candidate(s) in terms of the advancement of legal theory or practice, but also in the realization of the rule of law in contemporary societies through the influences or inspiration of the work of the candidate(s).

== Laureates ==
Each laureate receives a Tang Prize medal and diploma. In addition, NT$40 million (US$1.3 million) cash prize is awarded in each category, as well as a research grant of NT$10 million (US$0.33 million), for a total of NT$50 million (US$1.63 million). Should two, or up to three, candidates receive an award in the same category, the cash prize and research grant are shared.

Year	Field	Name	Nationality	Citation
2026	Rule of Law	Bruce Ackerman	United States	
2026	Sinology	Ge Zhaoguang	China	
2026	Biopharmaceutical Science	Steven A. Rosenberg	United States	
2026	Biopharmaceutical Science	Michel Sadelain	France / United States	
2026	Biopharmaceutical Science	Carl H. June	United States	
2026	Sustainable Development	Susan Solomon	United States	
2024	Rule of Law	Mary Robinson	Ireland	
2024	Sinology	Hsu Cho-yun	Taiwan / United States	
2024	Biopharmaceutical Science	Joel F. Habener	United States	
2024	Biopharmaceutical Science	Svetlana Mojsov	United States	
2024	Biopharmaceutical Science	Jens Juul Holst	Denmark	
2024	Sustainable Development	Omar M. Yaghi	Jordan/Saudi Arabia/United States	
2022	Rule of Law	Cheryl Saunders	Australia	
2022	Sinology	Jessica Rawson	United Kingdom	
2022	Biopharmaceutical Science	Katalin Kariko	Hungary / United States	
2022	Biopharmaceutical Science	Drew Weissman	United States	
2022	Biopharmaceutical Science	Pieter Cullis	Canada	
2022	Sustainable Development	Jeffrey D. Sachs	United States	
2020	Rule of Law	Bangladesh Environmental Lawyers Association	Bangladesh	
2020	Rule of Law	Dejusticia: The Center for Law, Justice and Society	Colombia	
2020	Rule of Law	The Legal Agenda	Lebanon	
2020	Sinology	Wang Gungwu	Australia	
2020	Biopharmaceutical Science	Charles Dinarello	United States	
2020	Biopharmaceutical Science	Marc Feldmann	Australia; United Kingdom	
2020	Biopharmaceutical Science	Tadamitsu Kishimoto	Japan	
2020	Sustainable Development	Jane Goodall	United Kingdom	
2018	Rule of Law	Joseph Raz	United Kingdom; Israel	
2018	Sinology	Stephen Owen	United States	
2018	Sinology	Yoshinobu Shiba	Japan	
2018	Biopharmaceutical Science	Anthony R. Hunter	United States	
2018	Biopharmaceutical Science	Brian J. Druker	United States	
2018	Biopharmaceutical Science	John Mendelsohn	United States	
2018	Sustainable Development	James E. Hansen	United States	
2018	Sustainable Development	Veerabhadran Ramanathan	India	
2016	Rule of Law	Louise Arbour	Canada	
2016	Sinology	William Theodore de Bary	United States	
2016	Biopharmaceutical Science	Emmanuelle Charpentier	France	
2016	Biopharmaceutical Science	Jennifer Doudna	United States	
2016	Biopharmaceutical Science	Feng Zhang	United States	
2016	Sustainable Development	Arthur H. Rosenfeld	United States	
2014	Rule of Law	Albie Sachs	South Africa	
2014	Sinology	Yu Ying-shih	Taiwan / United States	
2014	Biopharmaceutical Science	James P. Allison	United States	
2014	Biopharmaceutical Science	Tasuku Honjo	Japan	
2014	Sustainable Development	Gro Harlem Brundtland	Norway	

=== List of countries by laureates ===
Including 2026.

Rank	Country	Laureates
1	United States	24
2	United Kingdom	4
3	Japan	3
3	Australia	3
4	Canada	2
4	Taiwan	2
4	France	2
5	Norway	1
5	South Africa	1
5	India	1
5	Israel	1
5	Bangladesh	1
5	Colombia	1
5	Lebanon	1
5	Hungary	1
5	Jordan	1
5	Saudi Arabia	1
5	Denmark	1
5	Ireland	1
5	China	1

== Selection Committee ==
Nomination and selection for the first and second Tang Prize cycles (2013–2014 and 2015–2016, respectively) were conducted by the Academica Sinica on commission of the Tang Prize Foundation; beginning with the third prize cycle (2017–2018), nomination and selection are now conducted by an independent selection committee which is formed in partial cooperation with the Academia Sinica.

The Tang Prize Selection Committee is composed of four separate committees, one per prize category. The committees invite respected scholars and institutions from around the world, including many Nobel laureates, to submit nominees, ensuring those nominated have attained a sufficient level of achievement.

== Timeline ==
Events during the award year:

Time	Event
May	Decisions made by the Selection Committee.
June 18–21	Announcement of the laureate(s) in each of the award category.
September	Award Ceremony and the Tang Prize Week events.

== See also ==
- List of environmental awards
