= John Mendelsohn (doctor) =

American doctor (1936–2019)

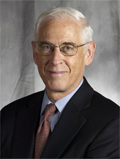
- Born: August 31, 1936; Cincinnati, Ohio, U.S.
- Died: January 7, 2019 (aged 82); Houston, Texas, U.S.
- Education: Harvard University; Memorial Sloan Kettering Cancer Center; Cornell University Medical College
- Scientific career
- Workplaces: MD Anderson Cancer Center; Baker Institute; University of California, San Diego

John Mendelsohn (August 31, 1936 – January 7, 2019) was a president of the University of Texas MD Anderson Cancer Center in Houston. He was an internationally recognized leader in cancer research.

Mendelsohn served as MD Anderson president from 1996 to 2011. When Ronald DePinho became president, he stepped down September 1, 2011. Mendelsohn remained on the faculty as co-director of the new Sheikh Khalifa Bin Zayed Al Nahyan Institute for Personalized Cancer Therapy. Also, he was a senior fellow in health and technology at the Baker Institute.

Mendelsohn was only the third full-time president of MD Anderson. When he arrived, Mendelsohn's focus shifted from his expertise in laboratory research and clinical trials to leading an institution that employs about 18,000 people and serves 100,000 patients yearly, with a budget of more than $3.3 billion.

== Background ==
Mendelsohn earned his bachelor's degree in sciences magna cum laude from Harvard College in 1958. He was the first undergraduate student of James D. Watson, who later won the Nobel Prize in Medicine for identifying the structure of DNA. After spending a year in Scotland as a Fulbright Scholar in biochemistry, Mendelsohn received his medical degree cum laude from Harvard Medical School in 1963.

From 1970 to 1985 at the University of California, San Diego, Mendelsohn was founding director of a National Cancer Institute-designated cancer center, which he led from its inception in 1976 until he moved to Memorial Sloan Kettering Cancer Center. From 1985 to 1996, Mendelsohn chaired the institution's Department of Medicine and was co-head of the Program in Molecular Pharmacology and Therapeutics. He also was professor and vice chairman of medicine at Cornell University Medical College.

Mendelsohn was a member of the Audit Committee of Enron when it collapsed. He died on January 7, 2019, from glioblastoma.

== Research ==
When Mendelsohn joined MD Anderson, he had an international reputation for his research on how the binding of growth factors to cell-surface receptors regulates cell functions.

He and Gordon H. Sato and their collaborators in California produced monoclonal antibody 225, which inhibits human cancer cell proliferation by blocking the signaling pathways that are activated by epidermal growth factor receptors. His subsequent research in the laboratory and clinic pioneered the universally adopted concept of anti-receptor therapy that targets key cell signaling pathways as a new form of cancer treatment. Antibody 225 (commercially known as Cetuximab, or Erbitux) against the receptor for epidermal growth factor was approved by the United States Food and Drug Administration for treatment of colon cancer in 2004 and for head and neck cancer in 2006.

== Honors ==
Mendelsohn served 10 years as the founding editor of Clinical Cancer Research, and he has been on numerous editorial boards. He authored more than 250 scientific papers and articles for journals and books, and was senior editor of the textbook "The Molecular Basis of Cancer."

He was honored many times for his contributions to cancer research with major awards, including the Joseph H. Burchenal Clinical Research Award from the American Association for Cancer Research (1999), David A. Karnofsky Memorial Award from the American Society of Clinical Oncology (2002), Fulbright Lifetime Achievement Medal (2005), Dan David Prize in Cancer Therapy (2006), Dorothy P. Landon-AACR Prize for Translational Research (2008), AACR Margaret Foti Award for Leadership and Extraordinary Achievements in Cancer Research (2012) and Research!America's Geoffrey Beene Builders of Science Award (2013). He was elected to membership in the Institute of Medicine of the National Academy of Sciences and as a fellow of the American Academy of Arts and Sciences. He was presented with the Hope Funds for Cancer Research Award of Excellence (2015). In 2017 he received the Rell Sunn Award and in 2018 the Tang Prize.

He was a foreign member of the Royal Netherlands Academy of Arts and Sciences beginning in 2000.

== Selected publications ==
- Mendelsohn J. Targeting the epidermal growth factor receptor for cancer therapy (David A. Karnofsky Research Award Lecture). J Clin Oncol, 20:(18s) 1s-13s, 2002.
- Baselga J, Pfister D, Cooper MR, Cohen R, Burtness B, Bos M, D'Andrea G, Seidman A, Norton L, Gunnet K, Anderson V, Waksal H, Mendelsohn J. Phase I studies of anti-epidermal growth factor receptor chimeric antibody C225 alone and in combination with cisplatin. J Clin Oncol, 18:904-914, 2000.
- Baselga J, Norton L, Albanell J, Kim YM, Mendelsohn J. Recombinant humanized anti-HER2 antibody (Herceptin) enhances the antitumor activity of paclitaxel and doxorubicin against HER2/neu overexpressing human breast cancer xenografts. Cancer Res 58:2825-2831, 1998.
- Mendelsohn J and Fan Z. Epidermal growth factor receptor family and chemosensitization [Editorial]. J Natl Cancer Inst, 89:341-343, 1997.
- Wu X, Rubin M, Fan Z, DeBlasio T, Soos T, Koff A, Mendelsohn J. Involvement of p27KIP1 in G1 arrest mediated by an anti-epidermal growth factor receptor monoclonal antibody. Oncogene 12:1397-1403, 1996.
- Baselga J, Norton L, Masui H, Pandiella A, Coplan K, Miller WH, Mendelsohn J. Anti-tumor effects of doxorubicin in combination with anti-epidermal growth factor receptor monoclonal antibodies. J Natl Cancer Inst 85(16):1327-1333, 1993.
- Fan Z, Baselga J, Masui H, Mendelsohn J. Antitumor effect of anti-EGF receptor monoclonal antibodies plus cis-Diamminedichloroplatinum on well-established A431 xenografts. Cancer Res 53:4637-4642, 1993.
- Divgi CR, Welt S, Kris M, Real FX, Yeh SDJ, Gralla R, Merchant B, Schweighart S, Unger M, Larson SM, Mendelsohn J. Phase I and imaging trial of indium 111-labeled anti-epidermal growth factor receptor monoclonal antibody 225 in patients with squamous cell lung carcinoma. J Natl Cancer Inst 83:97-104, 1991.
- Van de Vijver M, Kumar R, Mendelsohn J. Ligand-induced activation of A431 cell EGF receptors occurs primarily by an autocrine pathway that acts upon receptors on the surface rather than intracellularly. J Biol Chem 266:7503-7508, 1991.
- Gill GN, Kawamoto T, Cochet C, Le A, Sato JD, Masui H, McLeod C, Mendelsohn J. Monoclonal anti-epidermal growth factor receptor antibodies which are inhibitors of epidermal growth factor binding and antagonists of epidermal growth factor-stimulated tyrosine protein kinase activity. J. Biol Chem 259:7755-7760, 1984.
- Masui H, Kawamoto T, Sato JD, Wolf B, Sato GH, Mendelsohn J. Growth inhibition of human tumor cells in athymic mice by anti-EGF receptor monoclonal antibodies. Cancer Res 44:1002-1007, 1984.
- Kawamoto T, Sato JD, Le A, Polikoff J, Sato GH, Mendelsohn J. Growth stimulation of A431 cells by EGF: Identification of high affinity receptors for epidermal growth factor by an anti-receptor monoclonal antibody. Proc Natl Acad Sci USA 80:1337-1341, 1983.

== Family ==
Mendelsohn married Anne Charles and had three children. Mendelsohn also had eight grandchildren.
