= Toshio Hirano =

Japanese immunologist and academic (born 1947)

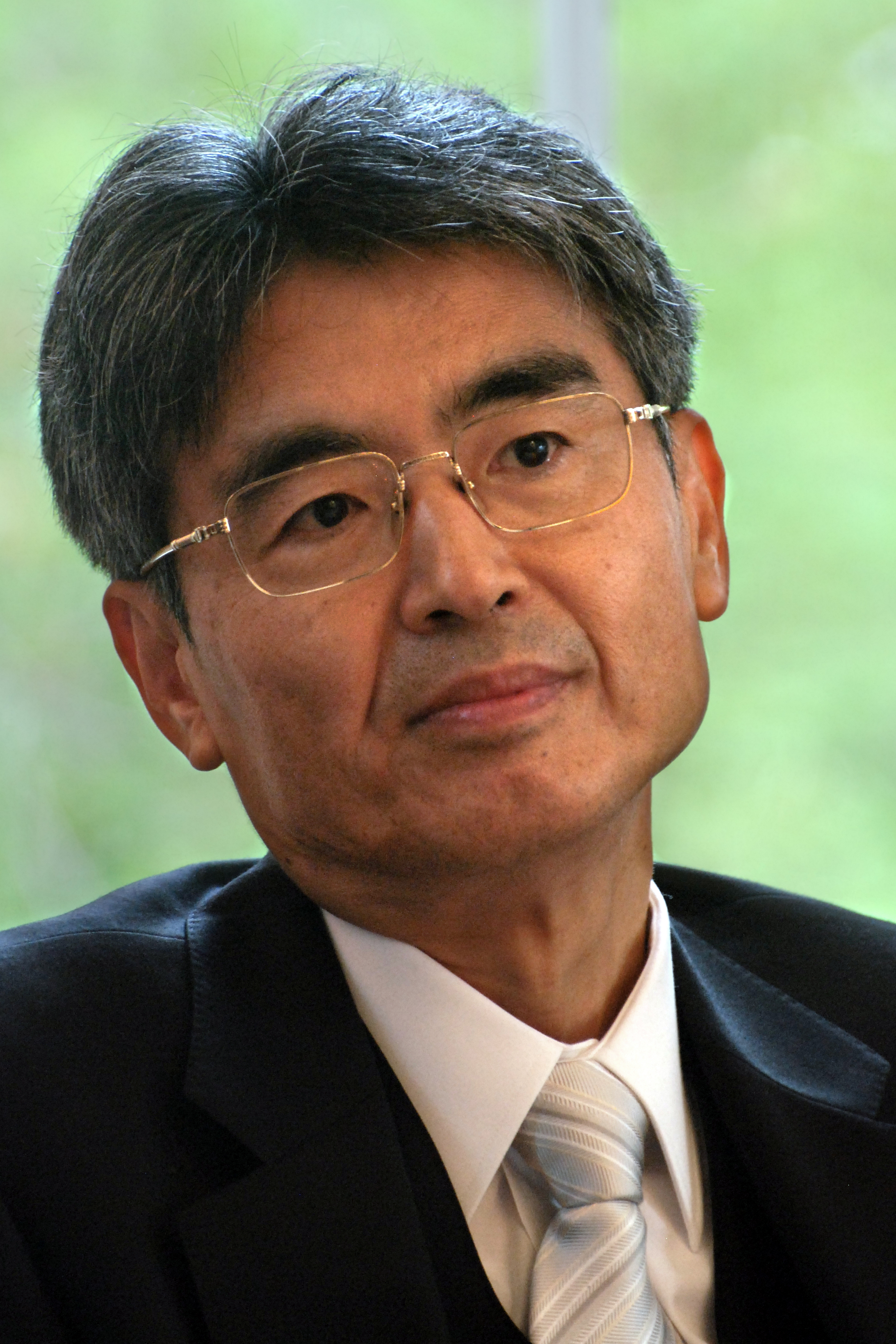
- Hirano in 2009
- Born: April 17, 1947 (age 79); Osaka
- Education: Osaka University
- Known for: Discovery of interleukin-6 and its application in treating diseases
- Awards: Crafoord Prize (2009); Japan Prize (2011)
- Scientific career
- Fields: Bioscience and Medical Science

Toshio Hirano (平野 俊夫, Hirano Toshio; born April 17, 1947 in Osaka, Japan) is a Japanese immunologist and academic, best known for his discovery of interleukin-6. Since August 2011, he has served as the 17th President of Osaka University.

== Chronology ==
- 1972—graduated from Graduate School of Medicine, Osaka University
- 1980—assistant professor in the School of Medicine, Kumamoto University
- 1984—assistant professor at Institute for Molecular and Cellular Biology, Osaka University
- 1989—professor at the same university
- 2004—Dean of Graduate School of Frontier Biosciences, Osaka University
- 2008—Dean of Graduate School of Medicine, Osaka University
- August 2011—the 17th president of Osaka University

== Honors and awards ==
- Erwin von Balz prize (Japan), 1986
- CIBA-GEIGY Rheumatism Prize (Japan), 1990
- Sandoz Prize for Immunology, 1992
- Osaka Science Prize (Japan), 1997
- Mochida Memorial Prize (Japan), 1998
- ISI Citation Laureate Award (Japan), 1981–98, 2000
- The Fujihara Award, 2004 The Fujiwara Foundation of Science
- Medical Award of The Japan Medical Association, 2005, The Japan Medical Association
- Medal of Honor with Purple Ribbon, April, 2006
- The Crafoord Prize in Polyarthritis 2009
- The Japan Prize for the discovery of interleukin-6, 2011
- Clarivate Citation Laureates, 2021
