= Eugene C. Butcher =

American immunologist

- Born: January 6, 1950 (age 76)
- Citizenship: American
- Education: Massachusetts Institute of Technology; Washington University School of Medicine
- Awards: Crafoord Prize (2004)
- Scientific career
- Fields: Immunology
- Workplaces: Stanford University School of Medicine

Eugene C. "Gene" Butcher (born 6 January 1950) is an American immunologist and a professor of pathology at Stanford University School of Medicine.

== Career ==
Eugene Butcher gained an undergraduate degree in chemistry from Massachusetts Institute of Technology in Boston and an MD from Washington University in St. Louis. In 1976 he began a residency in pathology at Stanford University School of Medicine in California, and was awarded a professorship in the Department of Pathology there. He is also staff physician and director of the Serology and Immunology Section at the Veterans Administration, Palo Alto Health Care System.

== Research focus ==
Butcher and his research team study the trafficking of white blood cells (lymphocytes, dendritic cells, monocytes, etc.), including their interactions with the endothelial lining of blood vessels at sites of leukocyte extravasation, and their chemotactic responses in tissues. These events regulate immune responses by controlling the access of leukocytes to sites of inflammatory or immune reaction in the body. He and his research team have shown that lymphocytes use a variety of different adhesion molecules or "homing receptors" to recognize organ (and/or inflammation)-specific vascular ligands or "addressins" that define the tissue position (address) of blood vessels in the body. Their studies have shown that these adhesion receptors act coordinately with G protein-linked serpentine chemoattractant receptors in a multi-step process that controls the specificity and provides combinatorial diversity in leukocyte trafficking.

A major focus of the group is on understanding the physiologic significance and control of targeted lymphocyte trafficking. To this end, they are studying the specialized homing mechanisms and functional properties of tissue infiltrating lymphocytes involved in local immune, autoimmune and regulatory responses in the GI tract (intestines, liver), skin, lungs, and other sites. Genetic, antibody and small molecule-based approaches allow them to define the role of trafficking molecules and mechanisms in models of autoimmune and infectious diseases. The team is also exploring mechanisms that imprint lymphocyte homing and chemokine receptor expression during tissue-specific immune responses, and are developing techniques to recapitulate such regulation in vitro for cell targeting and therapy. Dendritic cells (DC) play an important role in this context, and they are interested in the mechanisms by which specialized DC “interpret” and process local environmental signals (e.g. vitamins, metabolites, cytokines) to control T cell trafficking and regulatory vs. effector activities.

In other investigations, the team has identified novel lymphocyte, dendritic cell and macrophage chemoattractants and receptors, as well as monocyte and arterial wall endothelial molecules that regulate monocyte-endothelial interactions in models of atherogenesis. They are interested in the structure and function of these molecules, and their importance in disease models. Finally, they have shown that leukocytes can effectively navigate through complex chemoattractant arrays, and they are exploring the mechanisms that permit this surprising behavior through computer simulations of chemotactic behavior, and through experimental manipulation of the molecules and receptors involved.

== Recent Publications ==
- Sigmundsdottir H, Pan J, Debes GF, Alt C, Habtezion A, Soler D, Butcher EC "DCs metabolize sunlight-induced vitamin D3 to 'program' T cell attraction to the epidermal chemokine CCL27." Nat Immunol 2007
- Staton TL, Habtezion A, Winslow MM, Sato T, Love PE, Butcher EC "CD8(+) recent thymic emigrants home to and efficiently repopulate the small intestine epithelium." Nat Immunol 2006
- Zabel BA, Ohyama T, Zuniga L, Kim JY, Johnston B, Allen SJ, Guido DG, Handel TM, Butcher EC "Chemokine-like receptor 1 expression by macrophages in vivo: Regulation by TGF-beta and TLR ligands." Exp Hematol 2006; 34: 8: 1106-14
- Sato T, Thorlacius H, Johnston B, Staton TL, Xiang W, Littman DR, Butcher EC "Role for CXCR6 in recruitment of activated CD8+ lymphocytes to inflamed liver." J Immunol 2005; 174: 1: 277-83
- Butcher EC, "Innovation: Can cell systems biology rescue drug discovery?" Nat Rev Drug Discov 2005; 4: 6: 461-7
- Debes GF, Arnold CN, Young AJ, Krautwald S, Lipp M, Hay JB, Butcher EC "Chemokine receptor CCR7 required for T lymphocyte exit from peripheral tissues." Nat Immunol 2005; 6: 9: 889-94
- Reiss Y, Proudfoot AE, Power CA, Campbell JJ, Butcher EC "CC chemokine receptor (CCR)4 and the CCR10 ligand cutaneous T cell-attracting chemokine (CTACK) in lymphocyte trafficking to inflamed skin." J Exp Med 2001; 194: 10: 1541–1547
- Kim CH, Rott L, Kunkel EJ, Genovese MC, Andrew DP, Wu L, Butcher EC "Rules of chemokine receptor association with T cell polarization in vivo." J Clin Invest 2001; 108: 9: 1331–1339
- Campbell DJ, Kim CH, Butcher EC "Separable effector T cell populations specialized for B cell help or tissue inflammation." Nat Immunol 2001; 2: 9: 876-81
- Arnold CN, Campbell DJ, Lipp M, Butcher EC "The germinal center response is impaired in the absence of T cell-expressed CXCR5." Eur J Immunol 2007; 37: 1: 100-9
- Kalesnikoff J, Rios EJ, Chen CC, Nakae S, Zabel BA, Butcher EC, Tsai M, Tam SY, Galli SJ "RabGEF1 regulates stem cell factor/c-Kit-mediated signaling events and biological responses in mast cells." Proc Natl Acad Sci U S A 2006; 103: 8: 2659-64
- Gallatin WM, Weissman IL, Butcher EC "A cell-surface molecule involved in organ-specific homing of lymphocytes. 1983." J Immunol 2006; 177: 1: 5-9
- Fernekorn U, Butcher EC, Behrends J, Karsten CM, Röbke A, Schulze T, Kirchner H, Kruse A "Selectin Platelet Plays a Critical Role in Granulocyte Access to the Pregnant Mouse Uterus under Physiological and Pathological Conditions." Biol Reprod 2006
- Lin F, Butcher EC "T cell chemotaxis in a simple microfluidic device." Lab Chip 2006; 6: 11: 1462–1469
- Zabel BA, Zuniga L, Ohyama T, Allen SJ, Cichy J, Handel TM, Butcher EC "Chemoattractants, extracellular proteases, and the integrated host defense response." Exp Hematol 2006; 34: 8: 1021-32
- Feng N, Jaimes MC, Lazarus NH, Monak D, Zhang C, Butcher EC, Greenberg HB "Redundant Role of Chemokines CCL25/TECK and CCL28/MEC in IgA+ Plasmablast Recruitment to the Intestinal Lamina Propria After Rotavirus Infection." J Immunol 2006; 176: 10: 5749-59
- O'Hara EF, Williams MB, Rott L, Abola P, Hansen N, Jones T, Gurjal MR, Federspiel N, Butcher EC "Modified representational difference analysis: isolation of differentially expressed mRNAs from rare cell populations." Anal Biochem 2005; 336: 2: 221-30
- Butcher EC, Rouse RV, Coffman RL, Nottenburg CN, Hardy RR, Weissman IL "Surface phenotype of Peyer's patch germinal center cells: implications for the role of germinal centers in B cell differentiation. 1982." J Immunol 2005; 175: 3: 1363-72
- Habtezion A, Toivola DM, Butcher EC, Omary MB "Keratin-8-deficient mice develop chronic spontaneous Th2 colitis amenable to antibiotic treatment." J Cell Sci 2005; 118: Pt 9: 1971-80
- Bernardini G, Kim JY, Gismondi A, Butcher EC, Santoni A "Chemoattractant induces LFA-1 associated PI 3K activity and cell migration that are dependent on Fyn signaling." FASEB J 2005; 19: 10: 1305–1307
- Nakamichi I, Habtezion A, Zhong B, Contag CH, Butcher EC, Omary MB "Hemin-activated macrophages home to the pancreas and protect from acute pancreatitis via heme oxygenase-1 induction." J Clin Invest 2005; 115: 11: 3007-14
- Zabel BA, Silverio AM, Butcher EC "Chemokine-like receptor 1 expression and chemerin-directed chemotaxis distinguish plasmacytoid from myeloid dendritic cells in human blood." J Immunol 2005; 174: 1: 244-51
- Zabel BA, Allen SJ, Kulig P, Allen JA, Cichy J, Handel TM, Butcher EC "Chemerin activation by serine proteases of the coagulation, fibrinolytic and inflammatory cascades." J Biol Chem 2005
- Sato T, Habtezion A, Beilhack A, Schulz S, Butcher E, Thorlacius H "Short-term homing assay reveals a critical role for lymphocyte function-associated antigen-1 in the hepatic recruitment of lymphocytes in graft-versus-host disease." J Hepatol 2005.

== Awards ==
Crafoord Prize awarded by the Royal Swedish Academy of Sciences, 2004
