= Albany Medical Center Prize =

American award for medicine and biomedical research

The Albany Medical Center Prize in Medicine and Biomedical Research is the United States' second highest value prize in medicine and biomedical research, awarded by the Albany Medical Center. Among prizes for medicine worldwide, the Albany Medical Center Prize is the fourth most lucrative (after the $3 million Breakthrough Prize in Life Sciences, the $1.2 million Nobel Prize in Medicine and the $1 million Shaw Prize in life science and medicine).

Awarded annually, the $500,000 prize is bestowed to any physician or scientist, or group, whose work has led to significant advances in the fields of health care and scientific research with demonstrated translational benefits applied to improved patient care.

The prize is a legacy to its founder, the late Morris "Marty" Silverman. At the inaugural awards ceremony in Albany, NY in March 2001, Silverman started a tradition that will be carried on for one hundred years, the duration of the Prize. Silverman's promise was to light one candle each year to honor that year's recipient.

== Recipients ==
2026: Press Release

- Tony Hunter
- Dennis J. Slamon

2025: Press Release

- Jeffrey M. Friedman

2024: Press Release

- Howard Y. Chang
- Adrian R. Krainer
- Lynne E. Maquat

2023: Press Release

- Bonnie L. Bassler
- Jeffrey I. Gordon
- Dennis L. Kasper

2022: Press Release

- C. David Allis
- Michael Grunstein

2021: Press Release

- Barney Graham
- Katalin Karikó
- Drew Weissman

2020:

- Not awarded

2019: Press Release

- Bert Vogelstein
- Irving Weissman

2018: Press Release

- James P. Allison
- Carl H. June
- Steven A. Rosenberg

2017: Press Release

- Emmanuelle Charpentier
- Jennifer Doudna
- Luciano Marraffini
- Francisco Juan Martínez Mojica
- Feng Zhang

2016: Press Release

- F. Ulrich Hartl
- Arthur L. Horwich
- Susan L. Lindquist

2015: Press Release

- Karl Deisseroth
- Xiaoliang Xie

2014: Press Release

- Alexander Varshavsky

2013: Press Release

- Brian J. Druker
- Peter C. Nowell
- Janet D. Rowley

2012: Press Release

- James E. Darnell Jr
- Robert G. Roeder

2011: Press Release

- Elaine Fuchs
- James A. Thomson
- Shinya Yamanaka

2010: Press Release

- David Botstein
- Francis S. Collins
- Eric S. Lander

2009: Press Release

- Bruce A. Beutler
- Charles A. Dinarello
- Ralph M. Steinman

2008: Press Release

- Joan A. Steitz
- Elizabeth Blackburn

2007: Press Release

- Robert J. Lefkowitz
- Solomon H. Snyder
- Ronald M. Evans

2006: Press Release

- Seymour Benzer

2005: Press Release

- Robert S. Langer

2004:

- Stanley N. Cohen
- Herbert W. Boyer

2003:

- Michael S. Brown
- Joseph L. Goldstein

2002:

- Anthony Fauci

2001:

- Arnold J. Levine

== See also ==
- List of medicine awards
