= Dennis Kasper =

American microbiologist

Dennis L. Kasper
- Born: February 23, 1943 (age 83); Chicago, Illinois
- Citizenship: United States
- Education: University of Illinois, Urbana
- Spouse: Marie Scurti
- Awards: Squibb Award from the Infectious Diseases Society of America; NIH Career Development Award; NIH Merit Award; Professor John McArthur Award; 2001, Elected to National Academy of Medicine; 2018, Elected to National Academy of Sciences; 2023, Albany Prize for Biomedical Research; 2024, Paul Ehrlich and Ludwig Darmstaedter Prize
- Scientific career
- Fields: Microbiology, immunology
- Workplaces: Harvard Medical School
- Website: kasperlab.hms.harvard.edu

Dennis L. Kasper (born February 23, 1943) is an American microbiologist and immunologist, and the William Ellery Channing Professor of Medicine and Professor of Immunology at Harvard Medical School. He leads the Kasper Laboratory within the Blavatnik Institute in the Department of Immunology at Harvard Medical School. He was also executive dean for academic programs at Harvard Medical School and director of the Channing Laboratory Department of Medicine at Brigham and Women's Hospital.

Kasper is known for his research in interactions of the microbiome and immune system, and his work has played a key role in bringing modern molecular and chemical biology into understanding the role microbes have in development and regulation of the immune system. His primary focus is on immunochemistry alongside the genetics of bacteria and their role in virulence – research that has concentrated on topics related to bacterial polysaccharides and glycolipids. Kasper is also known as editor (alongside Anthony Fauci, Stephen L. Hauser and others) of Harrison's Principles of Internal Medicine – a book widely used by medical schools and practicing physicians.

== Work and life ==
Kasper was born on February 23, 1943, in Chicago, Illinois to first-generation American parents. He was the first in his family to attend college, going to the University of Illinois, Urbana on a pre-med track, and graduating in 1963 having majored in zoology. Kasper completed his medical training at both the University of Illinois College of Medicine, Chicago (graduating in 1967), New York Hospital (Cornell Medical Center) and Peter Bent Brigham Hospital (Brigham and Women's Hospital at Harvard Medical School). He began his research career at the Walter Reed Army Institute of Research from 1969 to 1972. He became an Albee Fellow at Harvard Medical School in 1973, and from 1979 to 1985 was an associate professor of medicine at Harvard Medical School. He later received an honorary Master's of Arts degree from Harvard University in 1986.

Kasper was director of the Channing Laboratory at Brigham and Women's Hospital from 1996 to 2012, and has been William Ellery Channing Professor of Medicine and Professor of Microbiology and Immunology at Harvard Medical School since 1989. He was also the scientific director at the New England Center of Excellence in Biodefense and Emerging Infectious Diseases at Harvard Medical School until 2014. Between 2002 and 2004, Kasper was President of the International Society of Infectious Diseases, and Kasper was the first chairman of the National Science Advisory Board of Biosecurity from 2005 to 2010. He also served as Chairman of Scientific Counselors at the National Institute of Allergy and Infectious Diseases between 1989 and 1993.

=== Research ===
Kasper's research has focused on immunochemistry, and has played a large role in the understanding of the role of the microbiota in the development of the immune system. Kasper's key research has included the identification of immunomodulatory molecules from the microbiome, and exploration of how these are used to treat immune-mediated diseases.

==== Microbes and the immune system ====
Kasper's research included elucidating the structure of the nine capsular polysaccharides of B Streptococcus (GBS). His work formed much of the understanding of the pathogenesis of GBS infection, and led to the development of vaccines for 5 major serotypes of the group. This work was instrumental in defining the 'mechanisms by which conjugate vaccines stimulate the immune system'. Kasper also led the discovery and development of glycoconjugate vaccines, currently in clinical trials, for preventing group B streptococcal infections.

Kasper's study of Bacteroides fragilis was fundamental to developing the understanding of relationship between gut microbiota and the immune system. His work on exploring the links between the two led to Kasper's election to the National Academy of Medicine in 2001, the American Academy of Microbiology in 2005, and the National Academy of Sciences in 2018.

His discovery of polysaccharide A of B. fragilis and further work relating to the development and regulation of the immune system by specific microbial molecules built upon the hygiene hypothesis, holding that exposure to microbes at an early age is critical to building a healthy immune system.

==== Immunomodulatory research ====
Kasper's research in the space of sphingolipids led his group to discover B. fragilis glycosphingolipids, which modulate natural killer T cell mediated inflammation in the colon; this alongside the polysaccharide A work were the first immunomodulatory molecules identified from the microbiome. Kasper noted "Such molecules are hard to find [...] It's because the technology required to do it requires bacteriology, immunology, chemistry, and genetics. Most [laboratories] specialize in one or the other. We do a little of everything to mechanistically understand how microbial molecules interact with the immune system."
