= Zhijian Chen =

Chinese-American biochemist

Zhijian "James" Chen
- 陈志坚
- Born: January 1, 1966 (age 60); Anxi County, Fujian, China
- Citizenship: United States
- Education: Fujian Normal University; State University of New York at Buffalo
- Known for: Discovery of cGAS
- Awards: NAS Award in Molecular Biology (2012); Lurie Prize in Biomedical Sciences (2018); Ray Wu award (2018); Breakthrough Prize in Life Sciences (2019); Louisa Gross Horwitz Prize (2023); Lasker Award (2024); Paul Ehrlich and Ludwig Darmstaedter Prize (2025); Japan Prize (2026)
- Scientific career
- Fields: Molecular biology
- Workplaces: Baxter Healthcare; University of Texas Southwestern Medical Center

Zhijian "James" Chen (simplified Chinese: 陈志坚; traditional Chinese: 陳志堅; pinyin: Chén Zhìjiān; Pe̍h-ōe-jī: Tân Chì-kian; born 1 January 1966) is a Chinese-American biochemist and professor in the department of molecular biology at University of Texas Southwestern Medical Center. He is best known for his discovery of mechanisms by which nucleic acids trigger innate and autoimmune responses from the interior of a cell, work for which he received the 2019 Breakthrough Prize in Life Sciences.

== Early life and education ==
Chen was born in Nandou Village (Chinese: 南斗; Pe̍h-ōe-jī: Lâm-táu) in An-khoe County, Fujian, China. When he was young, his father was sent to Lâm-pêng for work, leaving his mother to raise him and his two brothers alone while she also worked as a primary school teacher. He graduated from Anxi No. 1 High School in 1981. He attended Fujian Normal University and received an undergraduate degree in biology in 1985, before he won an overseas scholarship by getting first place in a biochemistry exam. Chen used the scholarship to attend the State University of New York at Buffalo, where he got his Ph.D. in biochemistry in 1991. During his graduate education, Chen became interested in the biochemical pathway of the protein ubiquitin at a time when less than a dozen laboratories were researching the protein's function in the human body. After graduating, Chen did a year of post-doctoral work with the Salk Institute for Biological Studies.

== Career ==
Following his post-doctoral work, Chen began working as a research scientist at Baxter Healthcare in Irvine, California. He then spent three years working as a senior scientist at biotech firm ProScript in Cambridge, Massachusetts, where he developed assays that helped to identify and improve the cancer treatment Velcade. His time at ProScript allowed Chen to work in molecular biology and drug development and it was while working there that Chen started researching ubiquitin. Working with Tom Maniatis of Harvard University in 1996, Chen found that the enzyme kinase had to be "activated" by ubiquitin in order for the NF-κB signalling process to function properly. He decided pursuing his research into ubiquitin would be more suited for work in academia and left ProScript in 1997 to start a lab at the University of Texas Southwestern Medical Center in Dallas. He currently holds the George L. MacGregor Distinguished Chair in Biomedical Science and is an Investigator of the Howard Hughes Medical Institute.

== Research ==
Chen's research initially focused on the role of ubiquitin in signaling pathways for the NF-κB protein complex, specifically as it pertains to immune response. At his lab in UT-Southwestern, Chen's group was able to show that ubiquitin marked proteins, marks that could be recognized by other proteins to create a "cascade" of signals. His research received grant funding from the Burroughs Wellcome Fund in 2002 enabling research into how NF-κB initiated immune responses to RNA viruses such as influenza and hepatitis C. This new line of research led to the discovery of MAVS (Mitochondrial Anti-Viral Signaling protein) and the role of mitochondria in antiviral innate immune responses, and the more recent discoveries of the cytosolic DNA sensor, Cyclic GMP-AMP synthase (cGAS; cGAMP synthase), and a new second messenger, Cyclic guanosine monophosphate–adenosine monophosphate (cyclic GMP-AMP, cGAMP), which play key roles in immune defense as well as autoimmune diseases.

== Honors and awards ==
In 2012 Chen was awarded the National Academy of Sciences Award in Molecular Biology, in 2018 the Lurie Prize in Biomedical Sciences from the National Institutes of Health for his discovery of cGAS and also in 2018 the Ray Wu award from the Chinese Biological Investigators Society. In 2019 Chen received the Breakthrough Prize in Life Sciences for the discovery of the DNA-sensing enzyme cGAS and the pathways by which it activates innate immune responses. He shared this prize with C. Frank Bennett, Adrian R. Krainer, Angelika Amon, and Xiaowei Zhuang. He has also received the Norman Hackerman Award in Chemical Research and the Edith and Peter O’Donnell Award in Science. In 2023 he was awarded the Louisa Gross Horwitz Prize, in 2024 the Lasker Award and for 2025 the Paul Ehrlich and Ludwig Darmstaedter Prize. In 2026 he was awarded the Japan Prize in the field of "Life Sciences".

Chen was elected to the National Academy of Sciences in 2014. He was appointed a Foreign Member of the Royal Society in 2025.
