= Ellen Sidransky =

American pediatrician and clinical geneticist

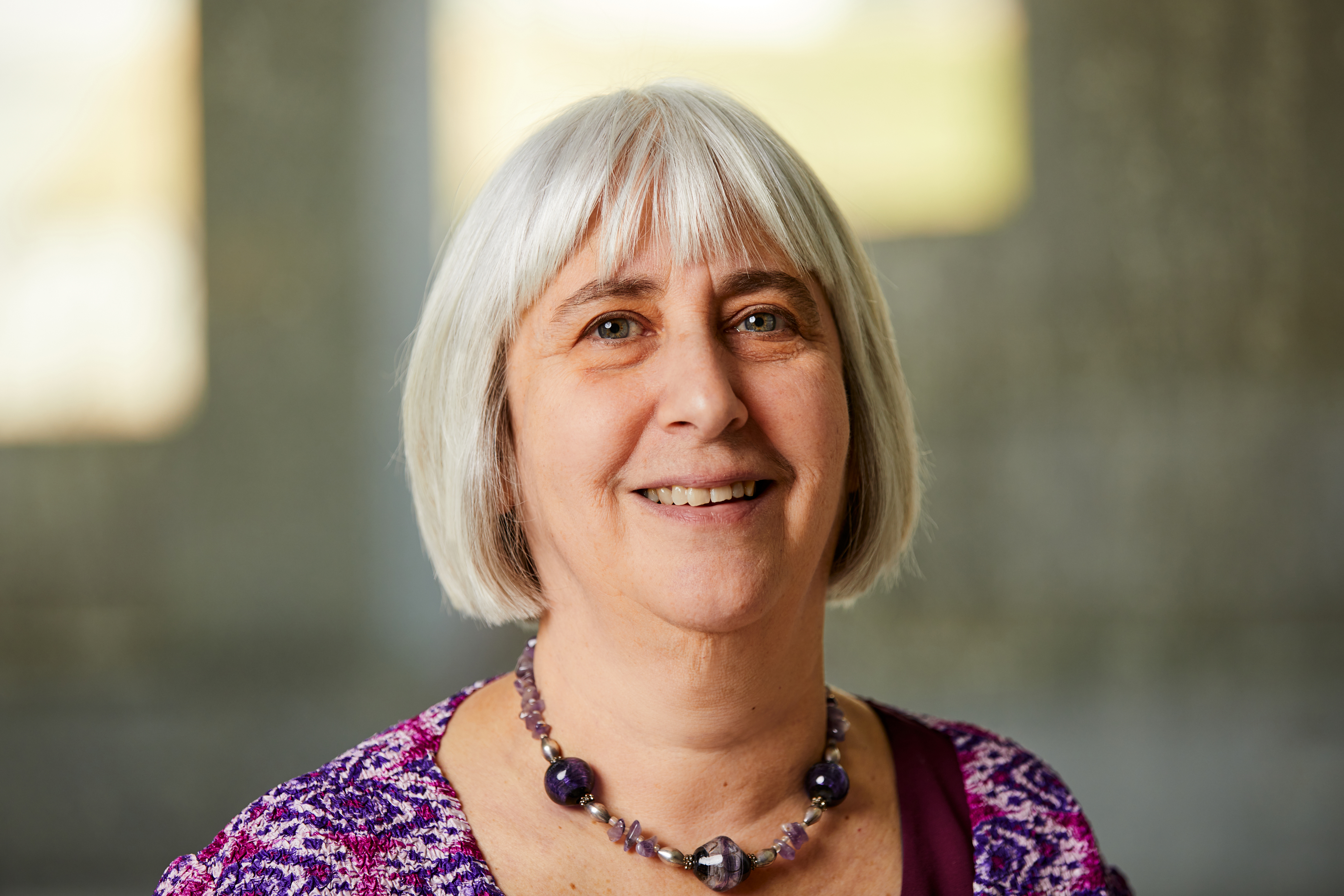
- Education: Brandeis University (B.A.); Tulane University School of Medicine (M.D.)
- Scientific career
- Fields: Pediatrics, clinical genetics
- Workplaces: National Human Genome Research Institute

Ellen Sidransky is an American pediatrician and clinical geneticist in the Medical Genetics Branch of the National Human Genome Research Institute. She is chief of the Molecular Neurogenetics Section.

== Education ==
Sidransky graduated magna cum laude from Brandeis University in 1977 with a B.A. in biology, and received a M.D. in 1981 from Tulane University School of Medicine. She then trained in pediatrics at Lurie Children's Hospital, and completed fellowship training in clinical genetics at the National Institutes of Health Genetics Training Program.

== Career ==
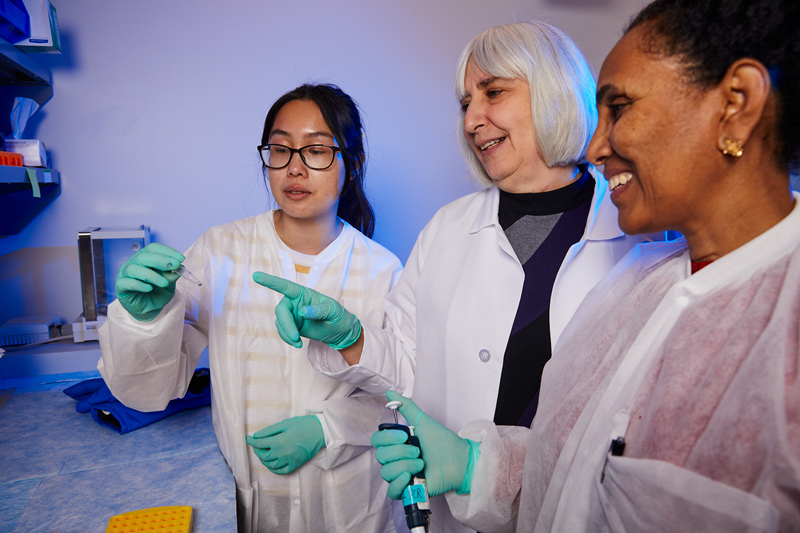
From left to right: Jenny Do, Ellen Sidransky and Bahafta Berhe in May 2019.

Sidransky came to the National Institutes of Health in the late 1980s to learn molecular biology techniques and train in Medical Genetics, where she studied patients with Gaucher disease. Sidransky has been a tenured investigator at NIH and a section chief since 2000. She is chief of the Molecular Neurogenetics Section and a pediatrician and clinical geneticist in the Medical Genetics Branch of the National Human Genome Research Institute.

== Research ==
Sidransky's research includes both clinical and basic research aspects of Gaucher disease and Parkinson's disease, and her group first identified glucocerebrosidase as a risk factor for parkinsonism. She led two large international collaborative studies regarding the genetics of Parkinson's disease and dementia with Lewy bodies. Her current work also focuses on understanding the complexity encountered in "simple" Mendelian disorders, the association between Gaucher disease and parkinsonism and the development of small molecule chaperones as therapy for Gaucher disease and potentially parkinsonism. Sidransky directs two NIH clinical protocols, one evaluating patients with lysosomal storage disorders and the second prospectively studying patients and relatives with parkinsonism who carry mutations in GBA. The Sidransky group uses a translational approach, integrating both clinical and basic sciences.

Over the past two decades, the Sidransky group has established a bank of clinical data, samples and ongoing clinical protocols on GD, to enable a better understanding of the natural history, the correlation of genotype with phenotype, and the contribution of factors modifying this disorder. Focusing on GD, the group is poised to investigate the intricate relationships between clinical manifestations, metabolic defects and molecular mechanisms, and to tackle the challenge of identifying genetic modifiers. Although GD is classically divided into three types, the section's research has shown that there is actually a continuum of manifestation, and they have uncovered several unexpected phenotypes.

== Awards and honors ==
In April 2019, Parkinson's awareness month, Van Andel Institute honored Sidransky with the Jay Van Andel Award for Outstanding Achievement in Parkinson's Disease Research. In September 2023, Breakthrough Prize in Life Sciences (2024) awarded to her with Thomas Gasser and Andrew Singleton.
