= Arthur L. Horwich =

American biologist (born 1951)

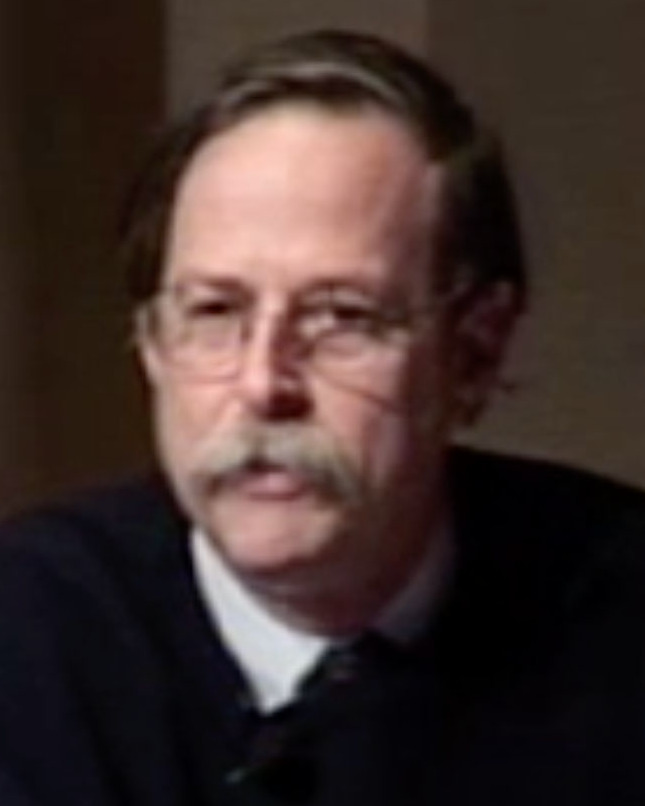
- Born: 1951 (age 74–75)
- Education: Brown University
- Known for: uncovering chaperonin action
- Awards: Gairdner Foundation International Award (2004); Wiley Prize (2007); Rosenstiel Award (2008); Louisa Gross Horwitz Prize (2008); Lasker Award (2011); Albany Prize (2016); Shaw Prize (2012); Breakthrough Prize (2020) BBVA Foundation Frontiers of Knowledge Award (2023)
- Scientific career
- Fields: Biology
- Workplaces: Yale School of Medicine; Howard Hughes Medical Institute
- Notable students: Tapan K. Chaudhuri

Arthur L. Horwich (born 1951) is an American biologist and Sterling Professor of Genetics and Pediatrics at the Yale School of Medicine. Horwich has also been a Howard Hughes Medical Institute investigator since 1990. His research into protein folding uncovered the action of chaperonins, protein complexes that assist the folding of other proteins; Horwich first published this work in 1989.

For his scientific work Horwich has been awarded the Gairdner International Award (2004), Louisa Gross Horwitz Prize (2008), Lasker Award (2011), Shaw Prize (2012), Albany Medical Center Prize (2016), and Breakthrough Prize (2020). He is a member of the National Academy of Sciences and the American Academy of Arts and Sciences.

== Early years ==
Horwich was born in 1951. He grew up in Oak Park, west of Chicago. In 1969, he entered Brown University as part of a new program that combined the undergraduate degree with medical school. During medical school, Horwich studied fat cell metabolism in the laboratory of John Fain. Horwich received his A.B. in biomedical sciences in 1972 and his M.D. in 1975. He graduated as valedictorian of the first class to complete the combined program. Horwich went on to do an internship and residency in pediatrics at Yale University. Midway through, Horwich was not sure about an entirely clinical future. After completing his residency, he joined the Salk Institute for Biological Studies in La Jolla, California for a postdoctoral position in molecular biology and virology. At Salk, he worked in Walter Eckhart's laboratory alongside Tony Hunter and witnessed Hunter's discovery of tyrosine phosphorylation. He credits this time with sharpening his skills as a scientist. He said, "Tony taught me the nuts and bolts of thinking about a problem."

== Research ==
In 1981, Horwich moved back to New Haven, Connecticut for a postdoctoral fellowship at Yale University School of Medicine. He worked in the laboratory of Leon Rosenberg.

In 1984, he moved across the hall from Rosenberg's lab to start his own laboratory as an assistant professor in the department of genetics. He still collaborated with members of the Rosenberg laboratory, including Wayne Fenton. As an independent researcher, Horwich asked whether the pathway that imports an enzyme called ornithine transcarbamylase (OTC) into the mitochondria of mammalian cells also could work in yeast. In 1987, during a genetic screen in yeast, Horwich and his colleagues stumbled across a protein folding function inside mitochondria. In the mutant strain, proteins entered mitochondria from the cytosol normally but then misfolded and aggregated. They named the protein encoded by the affected gene HSP60, Heat shock protein 60, because it has a mass of 60 kDa and is produced in larger quantity in response to heat. Hsp60 is found in an 850 kDa double ring assembly, each ring containing 7 copies of Hsp60. Such assemblies, known as chaperonins, also exist in other cellular compartments and are essential components, mediating protein folding under both heat shock and normal conditions.

Since 1987, Horwich and his colleagues have been studying these molecules both in vivo and in vitro, with particular emphasis on the Hsp60 homologue in E. coli known as GroEL. They and others found early on that a chaperonin-mediated folding reaction can be reconstituted in a test tube, and that has enabled structural and functional studies that have begun to explain how chaperonins work.

== Awards and honors ==
- 2001: Hans Neurath Award (Protein Society Award)
- 2003: Elected to the National Academy of Sciences.
- 2004: Canada Gairdner International Award
- 2006: Stein and Moore Award (Protein Society Award)
- 2007: Wiley Prize, awarded jointly with Franz-Ulrich Hartl
- 2008: Rosenstiel Award, awarded jointly with Hartl
- 2008: Louisa Gross Horwitz Prize for Biology or Biochemistry, Columbia University; awarded jointly with Hartl
- 2008: Elected to the National Academy of Medicine
- 2011: Massry Prize, Keck School of Medicine, University of Southern California
- 2011: Albert Lasker Award for Basic Medical Research, awarded jointly with Hartl
- 2012: Shaw Prize, awarded jointly with Hartl
- 2014: Honorary Doctorate of Medical Science, Brown University.
- 2016: Albany Medical Center Prize
- 2019: Paul Ehrlich and Ludwig Darmstaedter Prize
- 2019: Dr. Paul Janssen Award for Biomedical Research, awarded jointly with Hartl
- 2020: Breakthrough Prize in Life Sciences
- 2021: Elected to the American Academy of Arts and Sciences
- 2022: Human Frontier Science Program Nakasone Award
- 2023: BBVA Foundation Frontiers of Knowledge Award
