= Harrison's Principles of Internal Medicine =

American internal medicine textbook

- Language: English
- Subject: Internal medicine
- Genre: Medical reference, textbook
- Publisher: McGraw-Hill Professional
- Publication date: 1950 (1st edition); 2025 (22nd edition)
- Publication place: United States
- ISBN: 9781265979317

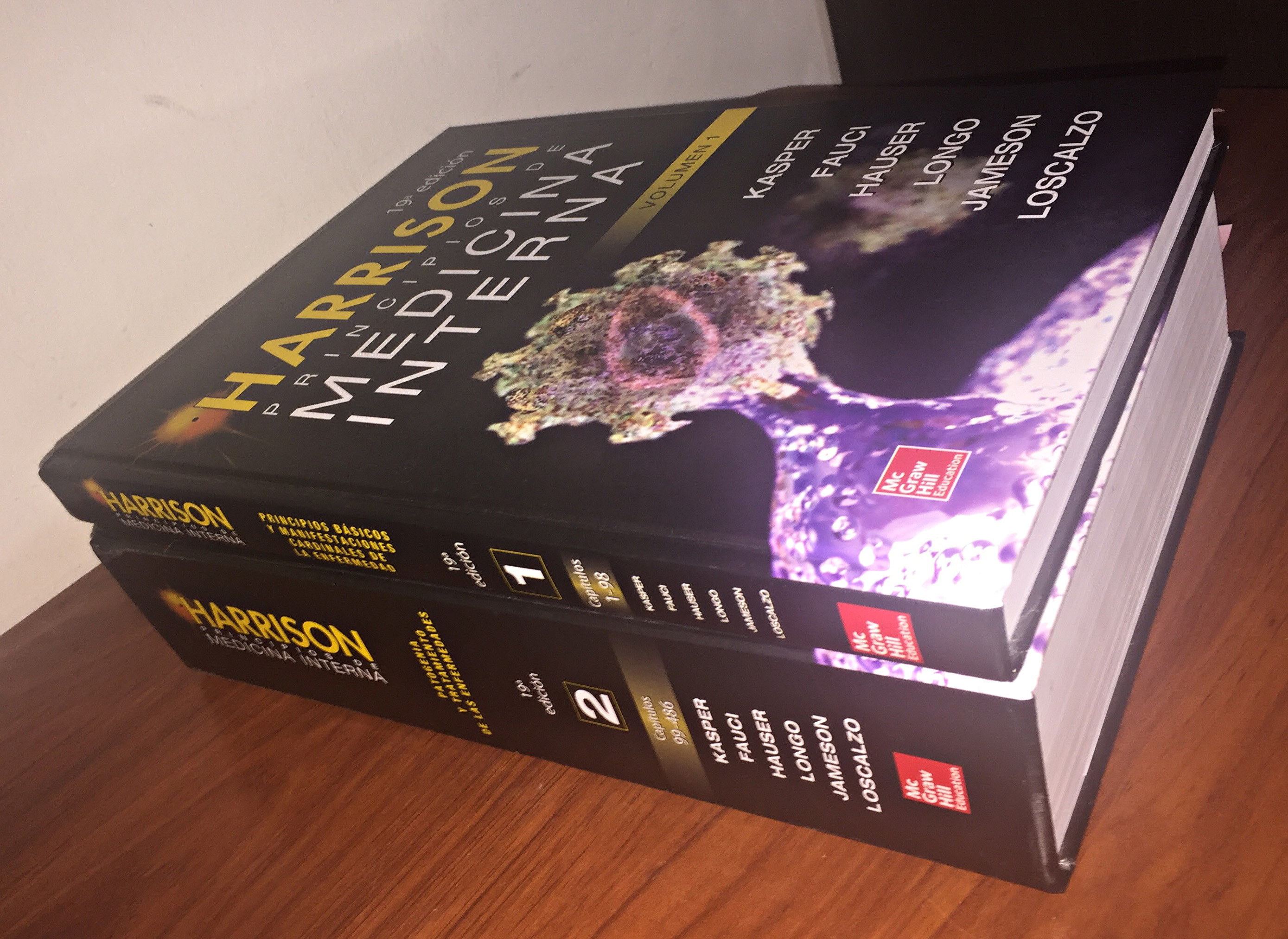
Spanish copy of Harrison's Principles of Internal Medicine in its 19th edition.

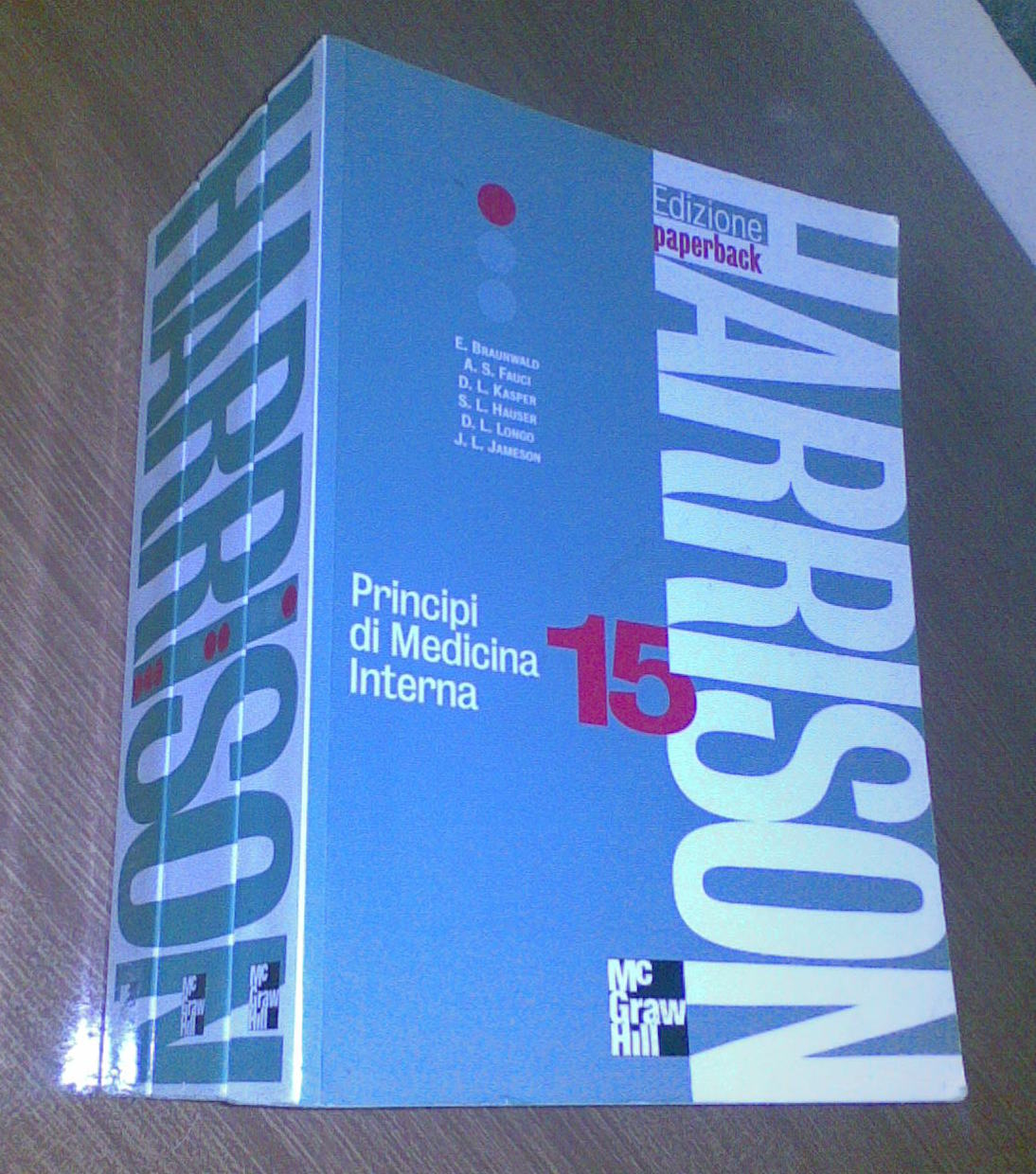
Harrison's Principles of Internal Medicine in Italian

Harrison's Principles of Internal Medicine is an American textbook of internal medicine. First published in 1950, it is in its 22nd edition (published in 2025 by McGraw-Hill Professional) and comes in two volumes. Although it is aimed at all members of the medical profession, it is mainly used by internists and junior doctors in this field, as well as medical students. It is widely regarded as one of the most authoritative books on internal medicine and has been described as the "most recognized book in all of medicine."

The work is named after Tinsley R. Harrison of Birmingham, Alabama, who served as editor-in-chief of the first five editions and established the format of the work: a strong basis of clinical medicine interwoven with an understanding of pathophysiology.

== History ==
It was published in 1950 by Blakiston. Creator and editor Tinsley Harrison's quotation appeared on the first edition of this book in 1950:

No greater opportunity or obligation can fall the lot of a human being than to be a physician. In the care of suffering he needs technical skill, scientific knowledge and human understanding. He who uses these with courage, humility and wisdom will provide a unique service to his fellow man and will build an enduring edifice of character within himself. The physician should ask of his destiny no more than this and he should be content with no less.

Blakiston was acquired by McGraw-Hill in 1954.

The 17th edition of the textbook is dedicated to George W. Thorn, who was editor of the first seven editions of the book and editor in chief of the eighth edition. He died in 2004.

The 18th edition of the book (ISBN 978-0071748896) was edited by Anthony Fauci, Dennis Kasper, Stephen Hauser, J. Larry Jameson and Joseph Loscalzo. New chapters added include "Systems Biology in Health and Disease," "The Human Microbiome," "The Biology of Aging," and "Neuropsychiatric Illnesses in War Veterans."

The 19th edition of the book was edited by Dennis Kasper, Anthony Fauci, Stephen Hauser, Dan Longo, J. Larry Jameson and Joseph Loscalzo.

AL.com in December 2014 wrote that it was still "a best-selling internal medicine text in the United States and around the world," and that it had been reprinted 16 times and translated into 14 languages.

The 20th edition of the book, edited by Dennis Kasper, Anthony Fauci, Stephen Hauser, Dan Longo, J. Larry Jameson and Joseph Loscalzo, was released on 17 August 2018.

The 21st edition of the book was released on 28 March 2022.

== Contents ==
Table of contents (20th edition)

Part 1: The Profession of Medicine

- Chapter 1: The Practice of Medicine
- Chapter 2: Promoting Good Health
- Chapter 3: Decision-Making in Clinical Medicine
- Chapter 4: Screening and Prevention of Disease
- Chapter 5: Health Care Systems in Developed Countries
- Chapter 6: The Safety and Quality of Health Care
- Chapter 7: Racial and Ethnic Disparities in Health Care
- Chapter 8: Ethical Issues in Clinical Medicine
- Chapter 9: Palliative and End-of-Life Care

Part 2: Cardinal Manifestations and Presentation of Diseases

Section 1: Pain

- Chapter 10: Pain: Pathophysiology and Management
- Chapter 11: Chest Discomfort
- Chapter 12: Abdominal Pain
- Chapter 13: Headache
- Chapter 14: Back and Neck Pain

Section 2: Alterations in Body Temperature

- Chapter 15: Fever
- Chapter 16: Fever and Rash
- Chapter 17: Fever of Unknown Origin

Section 3: Nervous System Dysfunction

- Chapter 18: Syncope (medicine)
- Chapter 19: Dizziness and Vertigo
- Chapter 20: Fatigue
- Chapter 21: Neurologic Causes of Weakness and Paralysis
- Chapter 22: Numbness, Tingling, and Sensory Loss
- Chapter 23: Gait Disorders, Imbalance, and Falls
- Chapter 24: Confusion and Delirium
- Chapter 25: Dementia
- Chapter 26: Aphasia, Memory Loss, Hemispatial Neglect, Frontal Syndromes, and Other Cerebral Disorders
- Chapter 27: Sleep Disorders

Section 4: Disorders of Eyes, Ears, Nose, and Throat

- Chapter 28: Disorders of the Eye
- Chapter 29: Disorders of Smell and Taste
- Chapter 30: Disorders of Hearing
- Chapter 31: Sore Throat, Earache, and Upper Respiratory Symptoms
- Chapter 32: Oral Manifestations of Disease

Section 5: Alterations in Circulatory and Respiratory Functions

- Chapter 33: Dyspnea
- Chapter 34: Cough
- Chapter 35: Hemoptysis
- Chapter 36: Hypoxia and Cyanosis
- Chapter 37: Edema
- Chapter 38: Approach to the Patient with a Heart Murmur
- Chapter 39: Palpitations

Section 6: Alterations in Gastrointestinal Function

- Chapter 40: Dysphagia
- Chapter 41: Nausea, Vomiting, and Indigestion
- Chapter 42: Diarrhea and Constipation
- Chapter 43: Unintentional Weight Loss
- Chapter 44: Gastrointestinal Bleeding
- Chapter 45: Jaundice
- Chapter 46: Abdominal Swelling and Ascites

Section 7: Alterations in Renal and Urinary Tract Function

- Chapter 47: Dysuria, Bladder Pain, and the Interstitial Cystitis/Bladder Pain Syndrome
- Chapter 48: Azotemia and Urinary Abnormalities
- Chapter 49: Fluid and Electrolyte Disturbances
- Chapter 50: Hypercalcemia and Hypocalcemia
- Chapter 51: Acidosis and Alkalosis

Section 8: Alterations in the Skin

- Chapter 52: Approach to the Patient with a Skin Disorder
- Chapter 53: Eczema, Psoriasis, Cutaneous Infections, Acne, and Other Common Skin Disorders
- Chapter 54: Skin Manifestations of Internal Disease
- Chapter 55: Immunologically Mediated Skin Diseases
- Chapter 56: Cutaneous Drug Reactions
- Chapter 57: Photosensitivity and Other Reactions to Light

Section 9: Hematologic Alterations

- Chapter 58: Interpreting Peripheral Blood Smears
- Chapter 59: Anemia and Polycythemia
- Chapter 60: Disorders of Granulocytes and Monocytes
- Chapter 61: Bleeding and Thrombosis
- Chapter 62: Enlargement of Lymph Nodes and Spleen

Part 3: Pharmacology

- Chapter 63: Principles of Clinical Pharmacology
- Chapter 64: Pharmacogenomics

Part 4: Oncology and Hematology

Section 1: Neoplastic Disorders

- Chapter 65: Approach to the Patient with Cancer
- Chapter 66: Prevention and Early Detection of Cancer
- Chapter 67: Cancer Genetics
- Chapter 68: Cancer Cell Biology
- Chapter 69: Principles of Cancer Treatment
- Chapter 70: Infections in Patients with Cancer
- Chapter 71: Oncologic Emergencies
- Chapter 72: Cancer of the Skin
- Chapter 73: Head and Neck Cancer
- Chapter 74: Neoplasms of the Lung
- Chapter 75: Breast Cancer
- Chapter 76: Upper Gastrointestinal Tract Cancers
- Chapter 77: Lower Gastrointestinal Cancers
- Chapter 78: Tumors of the Liver and Biliary Tree
- Chapter 79: Pancreatic Cancer
- Chapter 80: Neuroendocrine Tumors of the Gastrointestinal Tract and Pancreas
- Chapter 81: Renal Cell Carcinoma
- Chapter 82: Cancer of the Bladder and Urinary Tract
- Chapter 83: Benign and Malignant Diseases of the Prostate
- Chapter 84: Testicular Cancer
- Chapter 85: Gynecologic Malignancies
- Chapter 86: Primary and Metastatic Tumors of the Nervous System
- Chapter 87: Soft Tissue and Bone Sarcomas and Bone Metastases
- Chapter 88: Carcinoma of Unknown Primary
- Chapter 89: Paraneoplastic Syndromes: Endocrinologic/Hematologic
- Chapter 90: Paraneoplastic Neurologic Syndromes and Autoimmune Encephalitis
- Chapter 91: Late Consequences of Cancer and Its Treatment

Section 2: Hematopoietic Disorders

- Chapter 92: Hematopoietic Stem Cells
- Chapter 93: Iron Deficiency and Other Hypoproliferative Anemias
- Chapter 94: Disorders of Hemoglobin
- Chapter 95: Megaloblastic Anemias
- Chapter 96: Hemolytic Anemias
- Chapter 97: Anemia Due to Acute Blood Loss
- Chapter 98: Bone Marrow Failure Syndromes Including Aplastic Anemia and Myelodysplasia
- Chapter 99: Polycythemia Vera and Other Myeloproliferative Neoplasms
- Chapter 100: Acute Myeloid Leukemia
- Chapter 101: Chronic Myeloid Leukemia
- Chapter 102: Acute Lymphoid Leukemia
- Chapter 103: Chronic Lymphocytic Leukemia
- Chapter 104: Non-Hodgkin's Lymphoma
- Chapter 105: Hodgkin's Lymphoma
- Chapter 106: Less Common Hematologic Malignancies
- Chapter 107: Plasma Cell Disorders
- Chapter 108: Amyloidosis
- Chapter 109: Transfusion Biology and Therapy
- Chapter 110: Hematopoietic Cell Transplantation

Section 3: Disorders of Hemostasis

- Chapter 111: Disorders of Platelets and Vessel Wall
- Chapter 112: Coagulation Disorders
- Chapter 113: Arterial and Venous Thrombosis
- Chapter 114: Antiplatelet, Anticoagulant, and Fibrinolytic Drugs

Part 5: Infectious Diseases

Section 1: Basic Considerations in Infectious Diseases

- Chapter 115: Approach to the Patient with an Infectious Disease
- Chapter 116: Molecular Mechanisms of Microbial Pathogenesis
- Chapter 117: Approach to the Acutely Ill Infected Febrile Patient
- Chapter 118: Immunization Principles and Vaccine Use
- Chapter 119: Health Recommendations for International Travel
- Chapter 120: Climate Change and Infectious Disease

Section 2: Clinical Syndromes: Community-Acquired Infections

- Chapter 121: Pneumonia
- Chapter 122: Lung Abscess
- Chapter 123: Infective Endocarditis
- Chapter 124: Infections of the Skin, Muscles, and Soft Tissues
- Chapter 125: Infectious Arthritis
- Chapter 126: Osteomyelitis
- Chapter 127: Intraabdominal Infections and Abscesses
- Chapter 128: Acute Infectious Diarrheal Diseases and Bacterial Food Poisoning
- Chapter 129: Clostridium difficile Infection, Including Pseudomembranous Colitis
- Chapter 130: Urinary Tract Infections, Pyelonephritis, and Prostatitis
- Chapter 131: Sexually Transmitted Infections: Overview and Clinical Approach
- Chapter 132: Encephalitis
- Chapter 133: Acute Meningitis
- Chapter 134: Chronic and Recurrent Meningitis
- Chapter 135: Brain Abscess and Empyema
- Chapter 136: Infectious Complications of Bites

Section 3: Clinical Syndromes: Health Care-Associated Infections

- Chapter 137: Infections Acquired in Health Care Facilities
- Chapter 138: Infections in Transplant Recipients

Section 4: Therapy for Bacterial Diseases

- Chapter 139: Treatment and Prophylaxis of Bacterial Infections
- Chapter 140: Bacterial Resistance to Antimicrobial Agents

Section 5: Diseases Caused by Gram-Positive Bacteria

- Chapter 141: Pneumococcal Infections
- Chapter 142: Staphylococcal Infections
- Chapter 143: Streptococcal Infections
- Chapter 144: Enterococcal Infections
- Chapter 145: Diphtheria and Other Corynebacterial Infections
- Chapter 146: Listeria monocytogenes Infections
- Chapter 147: Tetanus
- Chapter 148: Botulism
- Chapter 149: Gas Gangrene and Other Clostridial Infections

Section 6: Diseases Caused by Gram-Negative Bacteria

- Chapter 150: Meningococcal Infections
- Chapter 151: Gonococcal Infections
- Chapter 152: Haemophilus and Moraxella Infections
- Chapter 153: Infections Due to the HACEK Group and Miscellaneous Gram-Negative Bacteria
- Chapter 154: Legionella Infections
- Chapter 155: Pertussis and Other Bordetella Infections
- Chapter 156: Diseases Caused by Gram-Negative Enteric Bacilli
- Chapter 157: Acinetobacter Infections
- Chapter 158: Helicobacter pylori Infections
- Chapter 159: Infections Due to Pseudomonas, Burkholderia, and Stenotrophomonas Species
- Chapter 160: Salmonellosis
- Chapter 161: Shigellosis
- Chapter 162: Infections Due to Campylobacter and Related Organisms
- Chapter 163: Cholera and Other Vibrioses
- Chapter 164: Brucellosis
- Chapter 165: Tularemia
- Chapter 166: Plague and Other Yersinia Infections
- Chapter 167: Bartonella Infections, Including Cat-Scratch Disease
- Chapter 168: Donovanosis

Section 7: Miscellaneous Bacterial Infections

- Chapter 169: Nocardiosis
- Chapter 170: Actinomycosis
- Chapter 171: Whipple's Disease
- Chapter 172: Infections Due to Mixed Anaerobic Organisms

Section 8: Mycobacterial Diseases

- Chapter 173: Tuberculosis
- Chapter 174: Leprosy
- Chapter 175: Nontuberculous Mycobacterial Infections
- Chapter 176: Antimycobacterial Agents

Section 9: Spirochetal Diseases

- Chapter 177: Syphilis
- Chapter 178: Endemic Treponematoses
- Chapter 179: Leptospirosis
- Chapter 180: Relapsing Fever
- Chapter 181: Lyme Borreliosis

Section 10: Diseases Caused by Rickettsiae, Mycoplasmas, and Chlamydiae

- Chapter 182: Rickettsial Diseases
- Chapter 183: Infections Due to Mycoplasmas
- Chapter 184: Chlamydial Infections

Section 11: Viral Diseases: General Considerations

- Chapter 185: Medical Virology
- Chapter 186: Antiviral Chemotherapy, Excluding Antiretroviral Drugs

Section 12: Infections Due to DNA Viruses

- Chapter 187: Herpes Simplex Virus Infections
- Chapter 188: Varicella-Zoster Virus Infections
- Chapter 189: Epstein-Barr Virus Infections, Including Infectious Mononucleosis
- Chapter 190: Cytomegalovirus and Human Herpesvirus Types 6, 7, and 8
- Chapter 191: Molluscum Contagiosum, Monkeypox, and Other Poxvirus Infections
- Chapter 192: Parvovirus Infections
- Chapter 193: Human Papillomavirus Infections

Section 13: Infections Due to DNA and RNA Respiratory Viruses

- Chapter 194: Common Viral Respiratory Infections
- Chapter 195: Influenza

Section 14: Infections Due to Human Immunodeficiency Virus and Other Human Retroviruses

- Chapter 196: The Human Retroviruses
- Chapter 197: Human Immunodeficiency Virus Disease: AIDS and Related Disorders

Section 15: Infections Due to RNA Viruses

- Chapter 198: Viral Gastroenteritis
- Chapter 199: Enterovirus, Parechovirus, and Reovirus Infections
- Chapter 200: Measles (Rubeola)
- Chapter 201: Rubella (German Measles)
- Chapter 202: Mumps
- Chapter 203: Rabies and Other Rhabdovirus Infections
- Chapter 204: Arthropod-Borne and Rodent-Borne Virus Infections
- Chapter 205: Ebolavirus and Marburgvirus Infections

Section 16: Fungal Infections

- Chapter 206: Diagnosis and Treatment of Fungal Infections
- Chapter 207: Histoplasmosis
- Chapter 208: Coccidioidomycosis
- Chapter 209: Blastomycosis
- Chapter 210: Cryptococcosis
- Chapter 211: Candidiasis
- Chapter 211 Digital Extra: Candida auris: An Emerging Multidrug-Resistant Candida Species
- Chapter 212: Aspergillosis
- Chapter 213: Mucormycosis
- Chapter 214: Superficial Mycoses and Less Common Systemic Mycoses
- Chapter 215: Pneumocystis Infections

Section 17: Protozoal and Helminthic Infections: General Considerations

- Chapter 216: Introduction to Parasitic Infections
- Chapter 217: Agents Used to Treat Parasitic Infections

Section 18: Protozoal Infections

- Chapter 218: Amebiasis and Infection with Free-Living Amebae
- Chapter 219: Malaria
- Chapter 220: Babesiosis
- Chapter 221: Leishmaniasis
- Chapter 222: Chagas Disease and African Trypanosomiasis
- Chapter 223: Toxoplasma Infections
- Chapter 224: Protozoal Intestinal Infections and Trichomoniasis

Section 19: Helminthic Infections

- Chapter 225: Introduction to Helminthic Infections
- Chapter 226: Trichinellosis and Other Tissue Nematode Infections
- Chapter 227: Intestinal Nematode Infections
- Chapter 228: Filarial and Related Infections
- Chapter 229: Schistosomiasis and Other Trematode Infections
- Chapter 230: Cestode Infections

Part 6: Disorders of the Cardiovascular System

Section 1: Introduction to Cardiovascular Disorders

- Chapter 231: Approach to the Patient with Possible Cardiovascular Disease
- Chapter 232: Basic Biology of the Cardiovascular System
- Chapter 233: Epidemiology of Cardiovascular Disease

Section 2: Diagnosis of Cardiovascular Disorders

- Chapter 234: Physical Examination of the Cardiovascular System
- Chapter 235: Electrocardiography
- Chapter 236: Noninvasive Cardiac Imaging: Echocardiography, Nuclear Cardiology, and Magnetic Resonance/Computed Tomography Imaging
- Chapter 237: Diagnostic Cardiac Catheterization and Coronary Angiography

Section 3: Disorders of Rhythm

- Chapter 238: Principles of Electrophysiology
- Chapter 239: The Bradyarrhythmias: Disorders of the Sinoatrial Node
- Chapter 240: The Bradyarrhythmias: Disorders of the Atrioventricular Node
- Chapter 241: Approach to Supraventricular Tachyarrhythmias
- Chapter 242: Physiologic and Nonphysiologic Sinus Tachycardia
- Chapter 243: Focal Atrial Tachycardia
- Chapter 244: Paroxysmal Supraventricular Tachycardias
- Chapter 245: Common Atrial Flutter, Macroreentrant, and Multifocal Atrial Tachycardias
- Chapter 246: Atrial Fibrillation
- Chapter 247: Approach to Ventricular Arrhythmias
- Chapter 248: Premature Ventricular Beats, Non-Sustained Ventricular Tachycardia, and Idioventricular Rhythm
- Chapter 249: Sustained Ventricular Tachycardia
- Chapter 250: Polymorphic Ventricular Tachycardia and Ventricular Fibrillation
- Chapter 251: Electrical Storm and Incessant VT

Section 4: Disorders of the Heart

- Chapter 252: Heart Failure: Pathophysiology and Diagnosis
- Chapter 253: Heart Failure: Management
- Chapter 254: Cardiomyopathy and Myocarditis
- Chapter 255: Cardiac Transplantation and Prolonged Assisted Circulation
- Chapter 256: Aortic Valve Disease
- Chapter 257: Aortic Regurgitation
- Chapter 258: Mitral Stenosis
- Chapter 259: Mitral Regurgitation
- Chapter 260: Mitral Valve Prolapse
- Chapter 261: Tricuspid Valve Disease
- Chapter 262: Pulmonic Valve Disease
- Chapter 263: Multiple and Mixed Valvular Heart Disease
- Chapter 264: Congenital Heart Disease in the Adult
- Chapter 265: Pericardial Disease
- Chapter 266: Atrial Myxoma and Other Cardiac Tumors

Section 5: Coronary and Peripheral Vascular Disease

- Chapter 267: Ischemic Heart Disease
- Chapter 268: Non-ST-Segment Elevation Acute Coronary Syndrome (Non-ST-Segment Elevation Myocardial Infarction and Unstable Angina)
- Chapter 269: ST-Segment Elevation Myocardial Infarction
- Chapter 270: Percutaneous Coronary Interventions and Other Interventional Procedures
- Chapter 271: Hypertensive Vascular Disease
- Chapter 272: Renovascular Disease
- Chapter 273: Deep Venous Thrombosis and Pulmonary Thromboembolism
- Chapter 274: Diseases of the Aorta
- Chapter 275: Arterial Diseases of the Extremities
- Chapter 276: Chronic Venous Disease and Lymphedema
- Chapter 277: Pulmonary Hypertension

Part 7: Disorders of the Respiratory System

Section 1: Diagnosis of Respiratory Disorders

- Chapter 278: Approach to the Patient with Disease of the Respiratory System
- Chapter 279: Disturbances of Respiratory Function
- Chapter 280: Diagnostic Procedures in Respiratory Disease

Section 2: Diseases of the Respiratory System

- Chapter 281: Asthma
- Chapter 282: Hypersensitivity Pneumonitis and Pulmonary Infiltrates with Eosinophilia
- Chapter 283: Occupational and Environmental Lung Disease
- Chapter 284: Bronchiectasis
- Chapter 285: Cystic Fibrosis
- Chapter 286: Chronic Obstructive Pulmonary Disease
- Chapter 287: Interstitial Lung Disease
- Chapter 288: Disorders of the Pleura
- Chapter 289: Disorders of the Mediastinum
- Chapter 290: Disorders of Ventilation
- Chapter 291: Sleep Apnea
- Chapter 292: Lung Transplantation

Part 8: Critical Care Medicine

Section 1: Respiratory Critical Care

- Chapter 293: Approach to the Patient with Critical Illness
- Chapter 294: Acute Respiratory Distress Syndrome
- Chapter 295: Mechanical Ventilatory Support

Section 2: Shock and Cardiac Arrest

- Chapter 296: Approach to the Patient with Shock
- Chapter 297: Sepsis and Septic Shock
- Chapter 298: Cardiogenic Shock and Pulmonary Edema
- Chapter 299: Cardiovascular Collapse, Cardiac Arrest, and Sudden Cardiac Death

Section 3: Neurologic Critical Care

- Chapter 300: Coma
- Chapter 301: Severe Acute Encephalopathies and Critical Care Weakness
- Chapter 302: Subarachnoid Hemorrhage

Part 9: Disorders of the Kidney and Urinary Tract

- Chapter 303: Cellular and Molecular Biology of the Kidney
- Chapter 304: Acute Kidney Injury
- Chapter 305: Chronic Kidney Disease
- Chapter 306: Dialysis in the Treatment of Renal Failure
- Chapter 307: Transplantation in the Treatment of Renal Failure
- Chapter 308: Glomerular Diseases
- Chapter 309: Polycystic Kidney Disease and Other Inherited Disorders of Tubule Growth and Development
- Chapter 310: Tubulointerstitial Diseases of the Kidney
- Chapter 311: Vascular Injury to the Kidney
- Chapter 312: Nephrolithiasis
- Chapter 313: Urinary Tract Obstruction

Part 10: Disorders of the Gastrointestinal System

Section 1: Disorders of the Alimentary Tract

- Chapter 314: Approach to the Patient with Gastrointestinal Disease
- Chapter 315: Gastrointestinal Endoscopy
- Chapter 316: Diseases of the Esophagus
- Chapter 317: Peptic Ulcer Disease and Related Disorders
- Chapter 318: Disorders of Absorption
- Chapter 319: Inflammatory Bowel Disease
- Chapter 320: Irritable Bowel Syndrome
- Chapter 321: Diverticular Disease and Common Anorectal Disorders
- Chapter 322: Mesenteric Vascular Insufficiency
- Chapter 323: Acute Intestinal Obstruction
- Chapter 324: Acute Appendicitis and Peritonitis

Section 2: Nutrition

- Chapter 325: Nutrient Requirements and Dietary Assessment
- Chapter 326: Vitamin and Trace Mineral Deficiency and Excess
- Chapter 327: Malnutrition and Nutritional Assessment
- Chapter 328: Enteral and Parenteral Nutrition

Section 3: Liver and Biliary Tract Disease

- Chapter 329: Approach to the Patient with Liver Disease
- Chapter 330: Evaluation of Liver Function
- Chapter 331: The Hyperbilirubinemias
- Chapter 332: Acute Viral Hepatitis
- Chapter 333: Toxic and Drug-Induced Hepatitis
- Chapter 334: Chronic Hepatitis
- Chapter 335: Alcoholic Liver Disease
- Chapter 336: Nonalcoholic Fatty Liver Diseases and Nonalcoholic Steatohepatitis
- Chapter 337: Cirrhosis and Its Complications
- Chapter 338: Liver Transplantation
- Chapter 339: Diseases of the Gallbladder and Bile Ducts

Section 4: Disorders of the Pancreas

- Chapter 340: Approach to the Patient with Pancreatic Disease
- Chapter 341: Acute and Chronic Pancreatitis

Part 11: Immune-Mediated, Inflammatory, and Rheumatologic Disorders

Section 1: The Immune System in Health and Disease

- Chapter 342: Introduction to the Immune System
- Chapter 343: The Major Histocompatibility Complex
- Chapter 344: Primary Immune Deficiency Diseases

Section 2: Disorders of Immune-Mediated Injury

- Chapter 345: Urticaria, Angioedema, and Allergic Rhinitis
- Chapter 346: Anaphylaxis
- Chapter 347: Mastocytosis
- Chapter 348: Autoimmunity and Autoimmune Diseases
- Chapter 349: Systemic Lupus Erythematosus
- Chapter 350: Antiphospholipid Syndrome
- Chapter 351: Rheumatoid Arthritis
- Chapter 358: Inflammatory Myopathies
- Chapter 352: Acute Rheumatic Fever
- Chapter 353: Systemic Sclerosis (Scleroderma) and Related Disorders
- Chapter 354: Sjögren's Syndrome
- Chapter 355: The Spondyloarthritides
- Chapter 356: The Vasculitis Syndromes
- Chapter 357: Behçet's Syndrome
- Chapter 359: Relapsing Polychondritis
- Chapter 360: Sarcoidosis
- Chapter 361: IgG4-Related Disease
- Chapter 362: Familial Mediterranean Fever and Other Hereditary Autoinflammatory Diseases

Section 3: Disorders of the Joints and Adjacent Tissues

- Chapter 363: Approach to Articular and Musculoskeletal Disorders
- Chapter 364: Osteoarthritis
- Chapter 365: Gout and Other Crystal-Associated Arthropathies
- Chapter 367: Arthritis Associated with Systemic Disease, and Other Arthritides
- Chapter 366: Fibromyalgia
- Chapter 368: Periarticular Disorders of the Extremities

Part 12: Endocrinology and Metabolism

Section 1: Endocrinology

- Chapter 369: Approach to the Patient with Endocrine Disorders
- Chapter 370: Mechanisms of Hormone Action
- Chapter 371: Physiology of Anterior Pituitary Hormones
- Chapter 372: Hypopituitarism
- Chapter 373: Pituitary Tumor Syndromes
- Chapter 374: Disorders of the Neurohypophysis
- Chapter 375: Thyroid Gland Physiology and Testing
- Chapter 376: Hypothyroidism
- Chapter 377: Hyperthyroidism
- Chapter 378: Thyroid Nodular Disease and Thyroid Cancer
- Chapter 379: Disorders of the Adrenal Cortex
- Chapter 380: Pheochromocytoma
- Chapter 381: Multiple Endocrine Neoplasia
- Chapter 382: Autoimmune Polyendocrine Syndromes

Section 2: Sex- and Gender-Based Medicine

- Chapter 383: Disorders of Sex Development
- Chapter 384: Disorders of the Testes and Male Reproductive System
- Chapter 385: Disorders of the Female Reproductive System
- Chapter 386: Menstrual Disorders and Pelvic Pain
- Chapter 387: Hirsutism
- Chapter 388: Menopause and Postmenopausal Hormone Therapy
- Chapter 389: Infertility and Contraception
- Chapter 390: Sexual Dysfunction
- Chapter 391: Women's Health
- Chapter 392: Men's Health
- Chapter 393: Lesbian, Gay, Bisexual, and Transgender (LGBT) Health

Section 3: Obesity, Diabetes Mellitus, and Metabolic Syndrome

- Chapter 394: Pathobiology of Obesity
- Chapter 395: Evaluation and Management of Obesity
- Chapter 396: Diabetes Mellitus: Diagnosis, Classification, and Pathophysiology
- Chapter 397: Diabetes Mellitus: Management and Therapies
- Chapter 398: Diabetes Mellitus: Complications
- Chapter 399: Hypoglycemia
- Chapter 400: Disorders of Lipoprotein Metabolism
- Chapter 401: The Metabolic Syndrome

Section 4: Disorders of Bone and Mineral Metabolism

- Chapter 402: Bone and Mineral Metabolism in Health and Disease
- Chapter 403: Disorders of the Parathyroid Gland and Calcium Homeostasis
- Chapter 404: Osteoporosis
- Chapter 405: Paget's Disease and Other Dysplasias of Bone

Section 5: Disorders of Intermediary Metabolism

- Chapter 406: Heritable Disorders of Connective Tissue
- Chapter 407: Hemochromatosis
- Chapter 408: Wilson's Disease
- Chapter 409: The Porphyrias
- Chapter 410: Disorders of Purine and Pyrimidine Metabolism
- Chapter 411: Lysosomal Storage Diseases
- Chapter 412: Glycogen Storage Diseases and Other Inherited Disorders of Carbohydrate Metabolism
- Chapter 413: Inherited Disorders of Amino Acid Metabolism in Adults
- Chapter 414: Inherited Defects of Membrane Transport

Part 13: Neurologic Disorders

Section 1: Diagnosis of Neurologic Disorders

- Chapter 415: Approach to the Patient with Neurologic Disease
- Chapter 416: Neuroimaging in Neurologic Disorders
- Chapter 417: Pathobiology of Neurologic Diseases

Section 2: Diseases of the Central Nervous System

- Chapter 418: Seizures and Epilepsy
- Chapter 419: Cerebrovascular Diseases
- Chapter 420: Ischemic Stroke
- Chapter 421: Intracranial Hemorrhage
- Chapter 422: Migraine and Other Primary Headache Disorders
- Chapter 429: Amyotrophic Lateral Sclerosis and Other Motor Neuron Diseases
- Chapter 423: Alzheimer's Disease
- Chapter 424: Frontotemporal Dementia
- Chapter 425: Vascular Dementia
- Chapter 426: Dementia with Lewy Bodies
- Chapter 427: Parkinson's Disease
- Chapter 428: Tremor, Chorea, and Other Movement Disorders
- Chapter 430: Prion Diseases
- Chapter 431: Ataxic Disorders
- Chapter 432: Disorders of the Autonomic Nervous System
- Chapter 433: Trigeminal Neuralgia, Bell's Palsy, and Other Cranial Nerve Disorders
- Chapter 434: Diseases of the Spinal Cord
- Chapter 435: Concussion and Other Traumatic Brain Injuries
- Chapter 436: Multiple Sclerosis
- Chapter 437: Neuromyelitis Optica

Section 3: Nerve and Muscle Disorders

- Chapter 438: Peripheral Neuropathy
- Chapter 439: Guillain-Barré Syndrome and Other Immune-Mediated Neuropathies
- Chapter 440: Myasthenia Gravis and Other Diseases of the Neuromuscular Junction
- Chapter 441: Muscular Dystrophies and Other Muscle Diseases

Section 4: Chronic Fatigue Syndrome

- Chapter 442: Chronic Fatigue Syndrome

Section 5: Psychiatric and Addiction Disorders

- Chapter 443: Biology of Psychiatric Disorders
- Chapter 444: Psychiatric Disorders
- Chapter 445: Alcohol and Alcohol Use Disorders
- Chapter 446: Opioid-Related Disorders
- Chapter 447: Cocaine and Other Commonly Used Drugs
- Chapter 448: Nicotine Addiction

Part 14: Poisoning, Drug Overdose, and Envenomation

- Chapter 449: Heavy Metal Poisoning
- Chapter 450: Poisoning and Drug Overdose
- Chapter 451: Disorders Caused by Venomous Snakebites and Marine Animal Exposures
- Chapter 452: Ectoparasite Infestations and Arthropod Injuries

Part 15: Disorders Associated with Environmental Exposures

- Chapter 453: Altitude Illness
- Chapter 454: Hypothermia and Peripheral Cold Injuries
- Chapter 455: Heat-Related Illnesses

Part 16: Genes, the Environment, and Disease

- Chapter 456: Principles of Human Genetics
- Chapter 457: The Practice of Genetics in Clinical Medicine
- Chapter 458: Gene and Cell Based Therapy in Clinical Medicine
- Chapter 459: The Human Microbiome

Part 17: Global Medicine

- Chapter 460: Global Issues in Medicine
- Chapter 461: Worldwide Changes in Patterns of Infectious Disease
- Chapter 462: Primary Care and Global Health

Part 18: Aging

- Chapter 463: The Biology of Aging
- Chapter 464: Clinical Problems Associated with the Aging Process

Part 19: Consultative Medicine

- Chapter 465: Approach to Medical Consultation
- Chapter 466: Medical Disorders During Pregnancy
- Chapter 467: Medical Evaluation of the Surgical Patient

Part 20: Frontiers

- Chapter 468: Behavioral Economics and Health
- Chapter 469: Complementary, Alternative, and Integrative Health Approaches
- Chapter 470: Telomere Disease
- Chapter 471: The Role of Epigenetics in Disease and Treatment
- Chapter 472: Mitochondrial DNA and Heritable Traits and Diseases
- Chapter 473: Applications of Stem Cell Biology in Clinical Medicine
- Chapter 474: Microbial Genomics and Infectious Disease
- Chapter 475: The Role of Circadian Biology in Health and Disease
- Chapter 476: Network Medicine: Systems Biology in Health and Disease
- Chapter 477: Emerging Neurotherapeutic Technologies

Part 21: Video Collection

- Chapter V1: Video Library of Gait Disorders
- Chapter V2: Primary Progressive Aphasia, Memory Loss, and Other Focal Cerebral Disorders
- Chapter V3: Video Library of Neuro-Ophthalmology
- Chapter V4: Examination of the Comatose Patient
- Chapter V5: Video Atlas of Gastrointestinal Endoscopic Lesions
- Chapter V6: The Neurologic Screening Exam
- Chapter V7: Video Atlas of the Detailed Neurologic Examination

Part 22: Supplementary Topics

- Chapter S1: Fluid and Electrolyte Imbalances and Acid-Base Disturbances: Case Examples
- Chapter S2: Microbial Bioterrorism
- Chapter S3: Chemical Terrorism
- Chapter S4: Radiation Terrorism
- Chapter S5: Infections in War Veterans
- Chapter S6: Health Care for Military Veterans
- Chapter S7: Primary Immunodeficiencies Associated with (or Secondary to) Other Diseases
- Chapter S8: Cardiac Trauma
- Chapter S9: Technique of Lumbar Puncture
- Chapter S10: Classification of the Spinocerebellar Ataxias
- Chapter S11: Hyperbaric and Diving Medicine
- Chapter S12: The Clinical Laboratory in Modern Health Care
- Chapter S13: Laboratory Diagnosis of Infectious Diseases
- Chapter S14: Laboratory Diagnosis of Parasitic Infections

Part 23: Atlases

- Chapter A1: Atlas of Rashes Associated with Fever
- Chapter A2: Atlas of Oral Manifestations of Disease
- Chapter A3: Atlas of Urinary Sediments and Renal Biopsies
- Chapter A4: Atlas of Skin Manifestations of Internal Disease
- Chapter A5: Atlas of Hematology
- Chapter A6: Atlas of Blood Smears of Malaria and Babesiosis
- Chapter A7: Atlas of Electrocardiography
- Chapter A8: Atlas of Noninvasive Imaging
- Chapter A9: Atlas of Cardiac Arrhythmias
- Chapter A10: Atlas of Atherosclerosis
- Chapter A11: Atlas of Percutaneous Revascularization
- Chapter A12: Atlas of Chest Imaging
- Chapter A13: Atlas of Liver Biopsies
- Chapter A14: Atlas of the Vasculitic Syndromes
- Chapter A15: Atlas of Clinical Manifestations of Metabolic Diseases
- Chapter A16: Atlas of Neuroimaging

Part 24: Clinical Procedure Tutorials

- Chapter CP1: Clinical Procedure Tutorial: Central Venous Catheter Placement
- Chapter CP2: Clinical Procedure Tutorial: Thoracentesis
- Chapter CP3: Clinical Procedure Tutorial: Abdominal Paracentesis
- Chapter CP4: Clinical Procedure Tutorial: Endotracheal Intubation
- Chapter CP5: Clinical Procedures Tutorial: Percutaneous Arterial Blood Gas Sampling
- Chapter CP6: Clinical Procedures Tutorial: Lumbar Puncture
- Chapter CP7: Clinical Procedures Tutorial: Phlebotomy
- Chapter CP8: Clinical Procedures Tutorial: Insertion of Female Urethral Catheter
- Chapter CP9: Clinical Procedures Tutorial: Insertion of Male Urethral Catheter
- Chapter CP10: Clinical Procedures Tutorial: Fine Needle Aspiration of Breast Cyst
- Chapter CP11: Clinical Procedures Tutorial: IV Insertion
- Chapter CP12: Clinical Procedures Tutorial: Fine Needle Aspiration of Thyroid Nodules
- Chapter CP13: Clinical Procedures Tutorial: Gynecologic Examination with Pap Smear
- Chapter CP14: Clinical Procedures Tutorial: Knee Arthrocentesis
- Chapter CP15: Clinical Procedures Tutorial: Pericardiocentesis
- Chapter CP16: Clinical Procedures Tutorial: Bone Marrow Biopsy
- Chapter CP17: Clinical Procedures Tutorial: Basic Suturing

== Editors ==
The following is the list of editors, showing which editions they were an editor. Shaded boxes denote the chief editor of that edition.

	1	2	3	4	5	6	7	8	9	10	11	12	13	14	15	16	17	18	19	20	21	22
T. R. Harrison	X	X	X	X	X																	
W. R. Resnick	X	X	X	X	X																	
M. M Wintrobe	X	X	X	X	X	X	X															
G. W. Thorn	X	X	X	X	X	X	X	X														
R. D. Adams		X	X	X	X	X	X	X	X	X												
P. B. Beeson	X	X																				
I. L. Bennett, Jr.			X	X	X	X																
E. Braunwald						X	X	X	X	X	X	X	X	X	X	X	X					
K. J. Isselbacher						X	X	X	X	X	X	X	X	X								
R. G. Petersdorf						X	X	X	X	X	X	X										
J. D. Wilson									X	X	X	X	X	X								
J. B. Martin										X	X	X	X	X								
A. S. Fauci											X	X	X	X	X	X	X	X	X	X	X	X
R. Root												X										
D. L. Kasper													X	X	X	X	X	X	X	X	X	X
S. L. Hauser														X	X	X	X	X	X	X	X	X
D. L. Longo														X	X	X	X	X	X	X	X	X
J. L. Jameson															X	X	X	X	X	X	X	X
Joseph Loscalzo																	X	X	X	X	X	X
Steven M. Holland																						X
Carol A. Langford																						X

== See also ==
- List of medical textbooks
