= Breakthrough Prize in Life Sciences =

Award for breakthroughs in the life sciences

- Awarded for: Research aimed at curing intractable diseases and extending human life.
- Date: February 20, 2013; 13 years ago
- Reward: $3 million
- First award: 2013
- Website: breakthroughprizeinlifesciences.org

The Breakthrough Prize in Life Sciences is a scientific award, funded by internet entrepreneurs Mark Zuckerberg and Priscilla Chan of Facebook; Sergey Brin of Google; entrepreneur and venture capitalist Yuri Milner; and Anne Wojcicki, one of the founders of the genetics company 23andMe.

The award of $3 million, the largest award in the sciences, is given to researchers who have made discoveries that extend human life. The Prize is awarded annually, beginning in 2013, with six awards given in each subsequent year. Winners are expected to give public lectures and form the committee to decide future winners. The ceremony takes place in the San Francisco Bay Area, with the symposiums alternating between University of California, Berkeley, University of California, San Francisco, and Stanford University.

== Laureates ==
Year	Portrait	Laureate (birth/death)	Country	Rationale	Affiliation
2013		Cornelia Bargmann (born 1961)	United States	"for the genetics of neural circuits and behavior, and synaptic guidepost molecules."	Rockefeller University
2013		David Botstein (1942–2026)	Switzerland; United States	"for linkage mapping of Mendelian disease in humans using DNA polymorphisms."	Princeton University
2013		Lewis C. Cantley (b. 1949)	United States	"for the discovery of PI 3-Kinase and its role in cancer metabolism."	Harvard Medical School; Weill Cornell Medical College
2013		Hans Clevers (b. 1957)	Netherlands	"for describing the role of Wnt signaling in tissue stem cells and cancer."	Hubrecht Institute
2013		Titia de Lange (b. 1955)	Netherlands; United States	"for research on telomeres, illuminating how they protect chromosome ends and their role in genome instability in cancer."	Rockefeller University
2013		Napoleone Ferrara (b. 1956)	Italy; United States	"for discoveries in the mechanisms of angiogenesis that led to therapies for cancer and eye diseases."	University of California, San Diego
2013		Eric S. Lander (b. 1957)	United States	"for the discovery of general principles for identifying human disease genes, and enabling their application to medicine through the creation and analysis of genetic, physical and sequence maps of the human genome."	Massachusetts Institute of Technology; Broad Institute
2013		Charles L. Sawyers (b. 1959)	United States	"for cancer genes and targeted therapy."	Howard Hughes Medical Institute; Memorial Sloan-Kettering Cancer Center
2013		Robert A. Weinberg (b. 1942)	United States	"for characterization of human cancer genes."	Massachusetts Institute of Technology; Whitehead Institute
2013		Shinya Yamanaka (b. 1962)	Japan	"for induced pluripotent stem cells."	Kyoto University; J. David Gladstone Institutes; University of California, San Francisco
2013		Bert Vogelstein (b. 1949)	United States	"for cancer genomics and tumor suppressor genes."	Howard Hughes Medical Institute; Johns Hopkins University
2014		James P. Allison (b. 1948)	United States	"for the discovery of T cell checkpoint blockade as effective cancer therapy."	M. D. Anderson Cancer Center
2014		Mahlon DeLong (1938–2024)	United States	"for defining the interlocking circuits in the brain that malfunction in Parkinson's disease – this scientific foundation underlies the circuit-based treatment of Parkinson's disease by deep brain stimulation."	Emory University
2014		Michael N. Hall (b. 1953)	United States; Switzerland	"for the discovery of Target of Rapamycin (TOR) and its role in cell growth control."	Biozentrum University of Basel
2014		Robert Langer (b. 1948)	United States	"for discoveries leading to the development of controlled drug-release systems and new biomaterials."	Massachusetts Institute of Technology
2014	75pg	Richard P. Lifton (b. 1953)	United States	"for the discovery of genes and biochemical mechanisms that cause hypertension."	Yale University School of Medicine
2014		Alexander Varshavsky (b. 1946)	Russia; United States	"for discovering critical molecular determinants and biological functions of intracellular protein degradation."	Caltech
2015		Alim-Louis Benabid (b. 1942)	France	"for the discovery and pioneering work on the development of high-frequency deep brain stimulation (DBS), which has revolutionized the treatment of Parkinson's disease."	Joseph Fourier University
2015		C. David Allis (1951–2023)	United States	"for the discovery of covalent modifications of histone proteins and their critical roles in the regulation of gene expression and chromatin organization, advancing the understanding of diseases ranging from birth defects to cancer."	Rockefeller University
2015		Victor Ambros (b. 1953)	United States	"for the discovery of a new world of genetic regulation by microRNAs, a class of tiny RNA molecules that inhibit translation or destabilize complementary mRNA targets."	University of Massachusetts Medical School
2015		Gary Ruvkun (b. 1952)	United States	"for the discovery of a new world of genetic regulation by microRNAs, a class of tiny RNA molecules that inhibit translation or destabilize complementary mRNA targets."	Massachusetts General Hospital; Harvard Medical School
2015		Jennifer Doudna (b. 1964)	United States	"for harnessing an ancient mechanism of bacterial immunity into a powerful and general technology for editing genomes, with wide-ranging implications across biology and medicine."	University of California, Berkeley; Howard Hughes Medical Institute; Lawrence Berkeley National Laboratory
2015		Emmanuelle Charpentier (b. 1968)	France	"for harnessing an ancient mechanism of bacterial immunity into a powerful and general technology for editing genomes, with wide-ranging implications across biology and medicine."	Helmholtz Centre for Infection Research; Umeå University
2016		Edward S. Boyden (b. 1979)	United States	"for the development and implementation of optogenetics – the programming of neurons to express light-activated ion channels and pumps, so that their electrical activity can be controlled by light."	Massachusetts Institute of Technology
2016		Karl Deisseroth (b. 1971)	United States	"for the development and implementation of optogenetics – the programming of neurons to express light-activated ion channels and pumps, so that their electrical activity can be controlled by light."	Stanford University; Howard Hughes Medical Institute
2016		John Hardy (b. 1954)	United Kingdom	"for discovering mutations in the amyloid precursor protein (APP) gene that cause early onset Alzheimer's disease, linking accumulation of APP-derived beta-amyloid peptide to Alzheimer's pathogenesis and inspiring new strategies for disease prevention."	University College London
2016		Helen Hobbs (b. 1952)	United States	"for the discovery of human genetic variants that alter the levels and distribution of cholesterol and other lipids, inspiring new approaches to the prevention of cardiovascular and liver disease."	University of Texas Southwestern Medical Center; Howard Hughes Medical Institute
2016		Svante Pääbo (b. 1955)	Sweden	"for pioneering the sequencing of ancient DNA and ancient genomes, thereby illuminating the origins of modern humans, our relationships to extinct relatives such as Neanderthals, and the evolution of human populations and traits."	Max Planck Institute for Evolutionary Anthropology
2017		Stephen J. Elledge (b. 1956)	United States	"for elucidating how eukaryotic cells sense and respond to damage in their DNA and providing insights into the development and treatment of cancer."	Brigham and Women's Hospital; Harvard Medical School; Howard Hughes Medical Institute
2017		Harry F. Noller (b. 1939)	United States	"for discovering the centrality of RNA in forming the active centers of the ribosome, the fundamental machinery of protein synthesis in all cells, thereby connecting modern biology to the origin of life and also explaining how many natural antibiotics disrupt protein synthesis."	University of California, Santa Cruz
2017		Roeland Nusse (b. 1950)	Netherlands	"for pioneering research on the Wnt pathway, one of the crucial intercellular signaling systems in development, cancer and stem cell biology."	Stanford University; Howard Hughes Medical Institute
2017		Yoshinori Ohsumi (b. 1945)	Japan	"for elucidating autophagy, the recycling system that cells use to generate nutrients from their own inessential or damaged components."	Tokyo Institute of Technology
2017		Huda Zoghbi (b. 1954)	Lebanon; United States	"for discoveries of the genetic causes and biochemical mechanisms of spinocerebellar ataxia and Rett syndrome, findings that have provided insight into the pathogenesis of neurodegenerative and neurological diseases."	Baylor College of Medicine; Texas Children's Hospital; Howard Hughes Medical Institute
2018		Joanne Chory (1955–2024)	United States	"for discovering how plants optimize their growth, development, and cellular structure to transform sunlight into chemical energy."	Salk Institute for Biological Studies; Howard Hughes Medical Institute
2018		Peter Walter (b. 1954)	Germany; United States	"for elucidating the unfolded protein response, a cellular quality-control system that detects disease-causing unfolded proteins and directs cells to take corrective measures."	University of California, San Francisco; Howard Hughes Medical Institute
2018		Kazutoshi Mori (b. 1958)	Japan	"for elucidating the unfolded protein response, a cellular quality-control system that detects disease-causing unfolded proteins and directs cells to take corrective measures."	Kyoto University
2018		Kim Nasmyth (b. 1952)	United Kingdom	"for elucidating the sophisticated mechanism that mediates the perilous separation of duplicated chromosomes during cell division and thereby prevents genetic diseases such as cancer."	University of Oxford
2018		Don W. Cleveland (b. 1950)	United States	"for elucidating the molecular pathogenesis of a type of inherited ALS, including the role of glia in neurodegeneration, and for establishing antisense oligonucleotide therapy in animal models of ALS and Huntington disease."	University of California, San Diego
2019		C. Frank Bennett (b. 1960)	United States	"for the development of an effective antisense oligonucleotide therapy for children with the neurodegenerative disease spinal muscular atrophy."	Ionis Pharmaceuticals
2019		Adrian R. Krainer (b. 1958)	United States	"for the development of an effective antisense oligonucleotide therapy for children with the neurodegenerative disease spinal muscular atrophy."	Cold Spring Harbor Laboratory
2019		Angelika Amon (1967–2020)	Austria; United States	"for determining the consequences of aneuploidy, an abnormal chromosome number resulting from chromosome mis-segregation."	Massachusetts Institute of Technology
2019		Xiaowei Zhuang (b. 1972)	China; United States	"for discovering hidden structures in cells by developing super-resolution imaging – a method that transcends the fundamental spatial resolution limit of light microscopy."	Harvard University; Howard Hughes Medical Institute
2019		Zhijian James Chen (b. 1966)	China; United States	"for elucidating how DNA triggers immune and autoimmune responses from the interior of a cell through the discovery of the DNA-sensing enzyme cGAS."	UT Southwestern Medical Center; Howard Hughes Medical Institute
2020		Jeffrey M. Friedman (b. 1954)	United States	"for the discovery of a new endocrine system through which adipose tissue signals the brain to regulate food intake."	Rockefeller University; Howard Hughes Medical Institute
2020		Franz-Ulrich Hartl (b. 1957)	Germany	"for discovering functions of molecular chaperones in mediating protein folding and preventing protein aggregation."	Max Planck Institute of Biochemistry
2020		Arthur L. Horwich (b. 1951)	United States	"for discovering functions of molecular chaperones in mediating protein folding and preventing protein aggregation."	Yale School of Medicine; Howard Hughes Medical Institute
2020		David Julius (b. 1955)	United States	"for discovering molecules, cells, and mechanisms underlying pain sensation."	University of California, San Francisco
2020		Virginia Man-Yee Lee (b. 1945)	China; United States	"for discovering TDP43 protein aggregates in frontotemporal dementia and amyotrophic lateral sclerosis, and revealing that different forms of alpha-synuclein, in different cell types, underlie Parkinson's disease and Multiple System Atrophy."	University of Pennsylvania
2021		David Baker (b. 1962)	United States	"for developing technology that allowed the design of proteins never seen before in nature, including novel proteins that have the potential for therapeutic intervention in human diseases."	University of Washington; Howard Hughes Medical Institute
2021		Catherine Dulac (b. 1963)	France; United States	"for deconstructing the complex behavior of parenting to the level of cell-types and their wiring, and demonstrating that the neural circuits governing both male and female-specific parenting behaviors are present in both sexes."	Harvard University; Howard Hughes Medical Institute
2021		Yuk Ming Dennis Lo (b. 1963)	Hong Kong	"for discovering that fetal DNA is present in maternal blood and can be used for the prenatal testing of trisomy 21 and other genetic disorders"	The Chinese University of Hong Kong
2021		Richard J. Youle (b. 1952)	United States	"for elucidating a quality control pathway that clears damaged mitochondria and thereby protects against Parkinson's Disease."	National Institutes of Health
2022		Jeffery W. Kelly (b. 1960)	United States	"for elucidating the molecular basis of neurodegenerative and cardiac transthyretin diseases, and for developing tafamidis, a drug that slows their progression."	Scripps Research Institute
2022		Katalin Karikó (b. 1955)	Hungary; United States	"for engineering modified RNA technology which enabled rapid development of effective COVID-19 vaccines."	BioNTech; University of Pennsylvania
2022		Drew Weissman (b. 1958)	United States	"for engineering modified RNA technology which enabled rapid development of effective COVID-19 vaccines."	University of Pennsylvania
2022		Shankar Balasubramanian (b. 1966)	India; United Kingdom	"for the development of a robust and affordable method to determine DNA sequences on a massive scale, which has transformed the practice of science and medicine."	University of Cambridge
2022		David Klenerman (b. 1959)	United Kingdom	"for the development of a robust and affordable method to determine DNA sequences on a massive scale, which has transformed the practice of science and medicine."	University of Cambridge
2022		Pascal Mayer (b. 1963)	France	"for the development of a robust and affordable method to determine DNA sequences on a massive scale, which has transformed the practice of science and medicine."	Alphanosos
2023		Clifford P. Brangwynne (b. 1978)	United States	"for discovering a fundamental mechanism of cellular organization mediated by phase separation of proteins and RNA into membraneless liquid droplets."	Princeton University; Howard Hughes Medical Institute; Marine Biological Laboratory
2023		Anthony A. Hyman (b. 1962)	United Kingdom	"for discovering a fundamental mechanism of cellular organization mediated by phase separation of proteins and RNA into membraneless liquid droplets."	Max Planck Institute of Molecular Cell Biology and Genetics
2023		Demis Hassabis (b. 1976)	United Kingdom	"for developing a deep learning AI method that rapidly and accurately predicts the three-dimensional structure of proteins from their amino acid sequence.."	DeepMind
2023		John Jumper (b. 1985)	United States	"for developing a deep learning AI method that rapidly and accurately predicts the three-dimensional structure of proteins from their amino acid sequence.."	DeepMind
2023		Emmanuel Mignot (b. 1959)	United States	"for discovering that narcolepsy is caused by the loss of a small population of brain cells that make a wake-promoting substance, paving the way for the development of new treatments for sleep disorders.."	Stanford University School of Medicine
2023		Masashi Yanagisawa (b. 1960)	Japan; United States	"for discovering that narcolepsy is caused by the loss of a small population of brain cells that make a wake-promoting substance, paving the way for the development of new treatments for sleep disorders.."	University of Texas Southwestern Medical Center; University of Tsukuba
2024		Carl H. June (b. 1953)	United States	"for the development of chimeric antigen receptor T cell immunotherapy whereby the patient's T cells are modified to target and kill cancer cells."	Perelman School of Medicine, University of Pennsylvania
2024		Michel Sadelain (b. 1960)	France	"for the development of chimeric antigen receptor T cell immunotherapy whereby the patient's T cells are modified to target and kill cancer cells."	Memorial Sloan Kettering Cancer Center
2024		Sabine Hadida	Spain; United States	"for developing life-transforming drug combinations that repair the defective chloride channel protein in patients with cystic fibrosis."	Vertex Pharmaceuticals
2024		Paul Negulescu (b. 1962)	United States	"for developing life-transforming drug combinations that repair the defective chloride channel protein in patients with cystic fibrosis."	Vertex Pharmaceuticals
2024		Fredrick Van Goor	United States	"for developing life-transforming drug combinations that repair the defective chloride channel protein in patients with cystic fibrosis."	Vertex Pharmaceuticals
2024		Thomas Gasser	Germany	"for identifying GBA1 and LRRK2 as risk genes for Parkinson's disease, implicating autophagy and lysosomal biology as critical contributors to the pathogenesis of the disease."	Hertie Institute for Clinical Brain Research, University of Tübingen and German Center for Neurodegenerative Diseases
2024		Ellen Sidransky	United States	"for identifying GBA1 and LRRK2 as risk genes for Parkinson's disease, implicating autophagy and lysosomal biology as critical contributors to the pathogenesis of the disease."	National Human Genome Research Institute, NIH
2024		Andrew Singleton (b. 1972)	United Kingdom	"for identifying GBA1 and LRRK2 as risk genes for Parkinson's disease, implicating autophagy and lysosomal biology as critical contributors to the pathogenesis of the disease."	National Institute on Aging, NIH
2025		Daniel J. Drucker (b. 1956)	Canada	"For the discovery and characterization of GLP-1 and revealing its physiology and potential in treating diabetes and obesity."	Lunenfeld-Tanenbaum Research Institute; Sinai Health; University of Toronto
2025		Joel Habener (1937–2025)	United States	"For the discovery and characterization of GLP-1 and revealing its physiology and potential in treating diabetes and obesity."	Massachusetts General Hospital; Harvard Medical School
2025		Jens Juul Holst (b. 1945)	Denmark	"For the discovery and characterization of GLP-1 and revealing its physiology and potential in treating diabetes and obesity."	Novo Nordisk; University of Copenhagen
2025		Lotte Bjerre Knudsen (b. 1964)	Denmark	"For the discovery and characterization of GLP-1 and revealing its physiology and potential in treating diabetes and obesity."	Novo Nordisk; University of Copenhagen
2025		Svetlana Mojsov (b. 1947)	North Macedonia; United States	"For the discovery and characterization of GLP-1 and revealing its physiology and potential in treating diabetes and obesity."	Rockefeller University
2025		Stephen L. Hauser (b. 1949)	United States	"For establishing the role of B cells in multiple sclerosis and developing B-cell based treatments, and for revealing that Epstein-Barr virus infection is the leading risk for multiple sclerosis."	University of California, San Francisco
2025		Alberto Ascherio (b. 1953)	United States	"For establishing the role of B cells in multiple sclerosis and developing B-cell based treatments, and for revealing that Epstein-Barr virus infection is the leading risk for multiple sclerosis."	Harvard University
2025		David R. Liu (b. 1973)	United States	"For developing base editing and prime editing, technologies that edit the DNA of living systems without cutting the DNA double helix, and rewrite segments of genes at their native locations, enabling the correction or replacement of virtually any mutation."	Merkin Institute for Transformative Technologies; Harvard University; Howard Hughes Medical Institute
2026
2026		Jean Bennett (b. )	United States	For developing a therapy for inherited retinal degeneration that became the first FDA-approved gene therapy for a genetic disease.	University of Pennsylvania
2026		Katherine A. High (b. )	United States	For developing a therapy for inherited retinal degeneration that became the first FDA-approved gene therapy for a genetic disease.	University of Pennsylvania, Children’s Hospital of Philadelphia; Rockefeller University
2026		Albert Maguire (b. )	United States	For developing a therapy for inherited retinal degeneration that became the first FDA-approved gene therapy for a genetic disease.	University of Pennsylvania
2026		Stuart H. Orkin (b. 1946)	United States	For elucidating the mechanism driving the switch from fetal to adult hemoglobin and validating it as a therapeutic target for sickle-cell disease and beta-thalassemia.	Harvard Medical School; Howard Hughes Medical Institute
2026		Swee Lay Thein (b. 1952)	Malaysia; United States	For elucidating the mechanism driving the switch from fetal to adult hemoglobin and validating it as a therapeutic target for sickle-cell disease and beta-thalassemia.	National Heart, Lung and Blood Institute, National Institutes of Health
2026		Rosa Rademakers (b. 1978)	Netherlands	For the discovery of the most common genetic cause of ALS and frontotemporal dementia which charted the path for new mechanistic studies of these diseases.	VIB, University of Antwerp; Mayo Clinic
2026		Bryan Traynor (b. 1969)	Ireland; United States	For the discovery of the most common genetic cause of ALS and frontotemporal dementia which charted the path for new mechanistic studies of these diseases.	National Institute on Aging, National Institutes of Health

== See also ==
- Breakthrough Prize in Mathematics
- Breakthrough Prize in Fundamental Physics
- List of biology awards
- List of medicine awards
