= Lurie Prize in Biomedical Sciences =

Prize awarded by the Foundation for the National Institutes of Health

The Lurie Prize in Biomedical Sciences recognizes outstanding achievement by a promising young scientist in biomedical research. It is awarded annually by the Foundation for the National Institutes of Health.

Established in 2013 the award is worth $100,000 and was made possible by the gift of FNIH board member Ann Lurie. Prizewinners are selected by a jury of six distinguished biomedical researchers from a list of nominations.

== Recipients ==
Source: FNIH

- 2024: Howard Y. Chang
- 2023: Navdeep S. Chandel, Vamsi Mootha
- 2022: Anne Brunet, Andrew Dillin
- 2021: Xiaowei Zhuang
- 2020: Aviv Regev
- 2019: Yasmine Belkaid
- 2018: Zhijian “James” Chen
- 2017: David M. Sabatini
- 2016: Jeannie T. Lee
- 2015: Karl Deisseroth
- 2014: Jennifer Doudna
- 2013: Ruslan M. Medzhitov

== See also ==
- List of biomedical science awards
