= Franz-Ulrich Hartl =

German biochemist (born 1957)

- Born: 10 March 1957 (age 69); Essen, West Germany
- Education: Heidelberg University; LMU Munich
- Known for: Research of protein folding
- Awards: Gottfried Wilhelm Leibniz Prize; Gairdner Foundation International Award; Louisa Gross Horwitz Prize; Wiley Prize in Biomedical Science; Order of Merit of the Federal Republic of Germany; Heinrich Wieland Prize; Albert Lasker Award for Basic Medical Research; Shaw Prize; Albany Medical Center Prize; E.B. Wilson Medal; Breakthrough Prize in Life Sciences; Bavarian Maximilian Order for Science and Art; Schleiden Medal
- Scientific career
- Fields: Biochemistry
- Workplaces: Max Planck Institute of Biochemistry; Howard Hughes Medical Institute; Cornell University; Memorial Sloan Kettering Cancer Center; University of California, Los Angeles
- Thesis: Die Steuerung peroxisomaler Enzymaktivitäten durch Schilddrüsenhormon in der Leber der Ratte (The Regulation of Rat Liver Peroxisomal Metabolism by Thyroid Hormones) (1985)

Franz-Ulrich Hartl (born 10 March 1957) is a German biochemist and the current Executive Director of the Max Planck Institute of Biochemistry. He is known for his pioneering work in chaperone-mediated protein folding.

== Early life and education ==
Hartl was born in Essen, West Germany in 1957 to an electrical engineer father and a home economics teacher mother. His family moved to a village in northern part of the Black Forest when he was four. He was intrigued with biology since a young age, thanks to his hobby microscopist grandfather and a family friend who was a biology teacher. Hartl specifically became interested in biochemistry in high school after reading James Watson's account of the discovery of the helical structure of DNA, prompting him to study medicine and specialise in biochemistry at Heidelberg University. It was during this period when he had his first research experience, studying peroxisomes in rat liver. Hartl completed his MD degree in 1985.

== Career ==
After receiving his MD degree, one of the external examiners of Hartl's thesis, Walter Neupert, invited him to join his group at the Institute of Physiological Chemistry of LMU Munich as a postdoctoral researcher. Hartl then achieved habilitation in 1990, which is one of the requirements for professorship in Germany.

In 1989, Hartl spent a year as a postdoctoral fellow at William T. Wickner's group at the University of California, Los Angeles. In 1991, after obtaining habilitation, he moved to the Cellular Biochemistry and Biophysics Program of the Memorial Sloan Kettering Cancer Center, also becoming an associate professor at the Cornell University Medical College (now Weill Cornell Medicine). He was promoted to full professor 3 years later.

Hartl returned to Germany in 1997 to become one of the Directors of the Max Planck Institute of Biochemistry (MPIB). The Executive Director of MPIB rotates among the Directors every year, and Hartl is the current Executive Director for the year 2023.

During his time at the Memorial Sloan Kettering Cancer Center, Hartl was a William E. Snee Chair and a Howard Hughes Medical Institute investigator (1994–1997).

== Research ==
Hartl was known for his discovery of chaperone-mediated protein folding, made together with Arthur L. Horwich. Protein folding is the process where proteins attain their three-dimensional shapes required to be functional. His research on chaperones began during his time at LMU Munich. Soon after he arrived at Munich in 1985, the scientific field confirmed that proteins inside cells had to unfold before and crossing the mitochondrial membrane to enter mitochondria and then refold afterwards, and that heat shock proteins interacted with proteins before they crossed the mitochondrial or the cell membrane. This made the mitochondria a nice model to study protein folding. However, the long-held belief was that proteins fold spontaneously.

Walter Neupert, the LMU Munich professor under Hartl was working, introduced Hartl to Arthur L. Horwich. Using a mutant strain of yeast that could import a certain protein (ornithine transcarbamylase) into the mitochondria, but the protein could not fold or become functional once inside the mitochondria. They found the gene mutated in this mutant strain was identical to a previously discovered gene, HSP60. The HSP60 protein, encoded by the HSP60 gene, belongs to a family of chaperones called chaperonin.

Next, Hartl and Horwich investigated how the HSP60 protein helped proteins fold. They looked at another protein, dihydrofolate reductase, in Neurospora crassa, a fungus species, and found ATP, the energy currency in cells, is required for the HSP60 protein helping other proteins fold. Their finding showed HSP60-mediated protein folding is dependent on energy.

Hartl continued studying chaperones and protein folding after moving to the Memorial Sloan Kettering Cancer Center, focusing on the mechanism by which chaperones helping other proteins fold. He turned to the E. coli counterpart of the eukaryotic HSP60 protein, known as GroEL, and its helper protein GroES. His group showed chaperone-mediated folding actually consisted of a series of steps, and that multiple chaperones passed off partially folded proteins from one to the next. His group also found GroEL and GroES together formed a cage inside which the target protein was trapped and folded.

More recently, Hartl's work expanded to proteostasis, which a cell's regulation of protein biosynthesis, protein folding, protein trafficking, and protein degradation, and how abnormalities in proteostasis can cause protein aggregation and diseases.

== Personal life ==
Hartl is married to Manajit Hayer-Hartl, whom he met in 1986 at a molecular biology summer school on a Greek island. Hayer-Hartl is currently a research group leader at the Max Planck Institute of Biochemistry and a close collaborator of Hartl since 1991. She was awarded the ASBMB-Merck Award in 2021.

== Honours and awards ==
- 1998 – Member of the European Molecular Biology Organization
- 1999 – Academy Award of the Berlin-Brandenburg Academy of Sciences and Humanities
- 2000 – International Honorary Member of the American Academy of Arts and Sciences
- 2002 – Gottfried Wilhelm Leibniz Prize
- 2002 – Member of the German National Academy of Sciences Leopoldina
- 2004 – Member of the Bavarian Academy of Sciences
- 2004 – Canada Gairdner International Award
- 2005 – Ernst Jung Prize for Medicine
- 2006 – Stein and Moore Award, Protein Society
- 2006 – Körber European Science Prize
- 2007 – Wiley Prize in Biomedical Sciences
- 2007 – Lewis S. Rosenstiel Award for Distinguished Work in Basic Medical Research
- 2008 – Louisa Gross Horwitz Prize (Columbia University)
- 2009 – Otto Warburg Medal
- 2009 – Fellow of the American Association for the Advancement of Science)
- 2010 – Dr H.P. Heineken Prize for Biochemistry and Biophysics
- 2011 – Cross of Merit of the Order of Merit of the Federal Republic of Germany
- 2011 – International member of the National Academy of Sciences
- 2011 – Albert Lasker Award for Basic Medical Research
- 2011 – Massry Prize
- 2011 – Heinrich Wieland Prize
- 2012 – Shaw Prize in Life Science and Medicine
- 2012 – Fellow of the American Academy of Microbiology
- 2012 – Herbert Tabor Research Award, American Society for Biochemistry and Molecular Biology
- 2016 – Albany Medical Center Prize
- 2016 – Ernst Schering Prize
- 2016 – Fellow of the American Society for Cell Biology
- 2017 – E.B. Wilson Medal
- 2017 – Debrecen Award for Molecular Medicine
- 2019 – Paul Ehrlich and Ludwig Darmstaedter Prize
- 2019 – Dr. Paul Janssen Award for Biomedical Research
- 2020 – Breakthrough Prize in Life Sciences
- 2021 – Bavarian Maximilian Order for Science and Art
- 2022 – HFSP Nakasone Award
- 2023 – Schleiden Medal
- 2023 – BBVA Foundation Frontiers of Knowledge Award
