= Richard Youle =

American biochemist

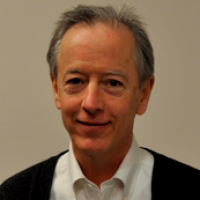
- Education: Albion College; University of South Carolina
- Scientific career
- Fields: Neurobiology
- Workplaces: National Institutes of Health

Richard James Youle (born September 20, 1952) is an American neurobiologist and molecular biologist. He is a Distinguished Investigator and head of the Biochemistry Section at the National Institute of Neurological Disorders and Stroke (NINDS) of the National Institutes of Health (NIH) in Bethesda, Maryland.

== Education ==
Youle graduated from Albion College with a bachelor's degree in 1974 and received his doctorate in biology from the University of South Carolina in 1977. At that time he was working on the poison ricin.

== Career ==
From 1978 to 1980 he was a member of the National Institute of Mental Health (NIMH) of the National Institutes of Health (NIH), from 1981 to 1984 as a senior member in the Laboratory of Neurochemistry. He initially researched toxic, cell-specific proteins. From 1984 he was a senior investigator there, and from 1985 in the surgical neurology department as a principal investigator. There he was involved in clinical tests for new treatment strategies for brain tumors as well as novel methods of bone marrow transplantation. He heads the section of biochemistry at National Institute of Neurological Disorders and Stroke (NINDS).

In his laboratory at NINDS, Youle then investigated molecular mechanisms of programmed cell death and the role of its regulation in the interaction between Bcl-2 and mitochondria. Youle found that an important step in the initiation of cell death is the migration of Bcl-xL and Bax, two members of the Bcl-2 protein family, from the cytosol onto the mitochondria. But his group also found that members of the Bcl-2 family play a role in regulating the morphogenesis of mitochondria, which form dynamic networks in cells through rapid division and fusion, in healthy cells. In 2010, he and colleagues found that PINK1 and Parkin, which are mutated in Parkinson's disease, are part of a control mechanism for detecting damaged mitochondria, which leads to their destruction. He also investigated molecular mechanisms of autophagy and mitophagy.

He received the NIH Director’s Award in 1992, 2011, and 2015.

For 2021 he received the Breakthrough Prize in Life Sciences for elucidating a quality control pathway that eliminates damaged mitochondria and thereby protects against Parkinson's disease. Also in 2021, Youle was elected to the American Academy of Arts and Sciences.

He published over 200 scientific papers and holds 16 patents

In 2025 amid the United States federal mass layoffs, Youle was erroneously removed from his position by secretary Robert F. Kennedy Jr before being reinstated six weeks later.
