= Tinsley R. Harrison =

American physician and textbook editor

Tinsley Randolph Harrison (March 18, 1900 – August 4, 1978) was an American physician and editor of the first five editions of Harrison's Principles of Internal Medicine. Harrison specialized in cardiology and the pathophysiology of heart disease.

== Early life and education ==
Harrison was born in Talladega, Alabama, on March 18, 1900. He was the son of Groce Harrison, himself a sixth-generation physician. Having graduated from public schools in Birmingham at the age of 15, he subsequently attended Marion Military Institute in Marion, Alabama for a year. He then pursued his undergraduate studies at the University of Michigan, earning a bachelor's degree in 1919. Dr. Harrison went on to complete his medical education at Johns Hopkins University in Baltimore. His roommate and tennis partner at Johns Hopkins was Alfred Blalock, with whom he developed a close lifelong friendship. He completed his internship at Peter Bent Brigham Hospital in Boston, returned to Hopkins for further training in internal medicine, and completed his residency at Vanderbilt University, where he served as the first chief resident in the Department of Medicine.

== Career ==
Harrison's special field of interest was cardiovascular medicine as well as the pathophysiological mechanisms of disease. His name is best known among physicians as the founding editor and editor-in-chief of the first five editions of Harrison's Principles of Internal Medicine. The text initiated several unique approaches to medical textbook writing, and remains, in its current edition, one of the most widely read and regarded textbooks in medicine. An under publicized fact is that Dr. Harrison pioneered the first bi-pass heart surgery, which was later enhanced by Michael DeBakey in Houston. Harrison's career included extensive work in research, publishing, medical education, and medical practice. He taught at Vanderbilt University's school of medicine, at what was then the Bowman Gray School of Medicine at Wake Forest University in North Carolina and at what is today the University of Texas Southwestern Medical School in Dallas, Texas.

Harrison spent the greatest part of his teaching career at the University of Alabama School of Medicine (now known as University of Alabama at Birmingham School of Medicine) in Birmingham, Alabama, where he served as Dean and chairman of the Department of Medicine. At UASOM, Harrison helped initiate a rapid period of growth that included recruitment of nationally known physicians from the faculties of such institutions as Harvard University and the Mayo Clinic. This period saw UASOM rise from local to international prominence. The Tinsley Harrison Research Tower at UASOM is named in his honor, among other sites of interest. Additionally, the current Internal Medicine Residency at UAB is named after Harrison.

== Death and biography ==

Tinsley Harrison Research Tower, University of Alabama at Birmingham School of Medicine

Harrison died in Birmingham at the age of 78 on August 4, 1978. In 2014, NewSouth Books released Tinsley Harrison, M.D.: Teacher of Medicine, a biography of Harrison that included interviews with Harrison, his family, and fellow doctors, written by his colleague and mentee James A. Pittman. The Montgomery Advertiser called the book "a superb examination of an extraordinary doctor's life, seen through the lens of a turbulent century of medical and social change" and the Anniston Star calls it a "finely crafted biography."

== Notable quotes ==
"Tact, sympathy and understanding are expected of the physician, for the patient is no mere collection of symptoms, signs, disordered functions, damaged organs, and disturbed emotions. The patient is human, fearful, and hopeful, seeking relief, help and reassurance. To the physician, as to the anthropologist, nothing human is strange or repulsive. The misanthrope may become a smart diagnostician of organic disease, but can scarcely hope to succeed as a physician. The true physician has a Shakespearean breadth of interest in the wise and the foolish, the proud and the humble, the stoic hero and the whining rogue. The physician cares for people."
