= Jeannie T. Lee =

American geneticist

- Education: Harvard University, University of Pennsylvania Medical School, Massachusetts Institute of Technology
- Awards: 2018 Harrington Rare Genetic Disease Scholar 2016 Lurie Award 2016 Centennial Award from Genetics Society of America 2015 Election to National Academy of Sciences (NAS) 2010 Molecular Biology Award from NAS 1999 Pew Scholar 1998 Basil O'Connor Scholar
- Scientific career
- Fields: epigenetics, long noncoding RNA, X-inactivation, 3D genome, X-chromosome reactivation technology
- Thesis: (1993)
- Academic advisors: Nancy Kleckner, Robert Nussbaum, Rudolf Jaenisch

Jeannie T. Lee is a Professor of Genetics (and Pathology) at Harvard Medical School and the Massachusetts General Hospital, and a Howard Hughes Medical Institute Investigator. She is known for her work on X-chromosome inactivation and for discovering the functions of a new class of epigenetic regulators known as long noncoding RNAs (lncRNAs), including Xist and Tsix.

== Education ==
Jeannie T. Lee received an AB from Harvard College in Biochemistry & Molecular Biology and an MD/PhD in 1993 from the University of Pennsylvania School of Medicine. While at Harvard she worked with Nancy Kleckner on antisense regulation of Tn10 transposition. While at University of Pennsylvania School of Medicine her advisor was Robert L. Nussbaum. Her PhD research focused on Fragile X syndrome, and led to her strong interest in X chromosome inactivation and epigenetics. Then she did postdoctoral work with Rudolf Jaenisch at the Whitehead Institute, during which she discovered the nature of the X-inactivation center. She was also Chief Resident of Laboratory Medicine at the Massachusetts General Hospital.

== Research career ==
Lee joined the faculty at Harvard in 1997 and devoted her studies to noncoding RNA and sex chromosome dynamics during development and disease. Her major career research achievements include identifying the X inactivation center, discovering Tsix antisense RNA, determining Xist's mechanism of action, demonstrating that a lncRNA is a regulator of Polycomb repressive complex 2, and determining that the X chromosome folds like origami and adopts a unique conformation.

Her studies established the existence and function of a group of lncRNAs. In a 2013 interview, she stated that this group of RNAs excited her because they control gene expression in a locus-specific way, by recruiting chromatin modifying activities to the locus, making the lncRNAs excellent drug design targets. She founded RaNA Therapeutics to test this idea.

Upon conferring the Lurie Prize to Lee in 2016, Dr. Charles A. Sanders of the Foundation for the National Institutes of Health remarked: "Dr. Lee's work has revolutionized the field of epigenetics. Her research has led to groundbreaking contributions, and we now have a better understanding of the unique role that long non-coding RNAs play in gene expression, which could lead to the development of new therapeutics."

Lee was President of the Genetics Society of America, Codirector of the Harvard Epigenetics Initiative, and is Vice Chair of the Department of Molecular Biology, Massachusetts General Hospital, Harvard Medical School. She delivered a set of lectures to iBiology on X chromosome inactivation.

== Notable publications ==
- Polycomb proteins targeted by a short repeat RNA to the mouse X chromosome. J Zhao, BK Sun, JA Erwin, JJ Song, JT Lee. Science, 2008
- Long noncoding RNAs: past, present, and future. JTY Kung, D Colognori, JT Lee. Genetics, 2013
- Epigenetic regulation by long noncoding RNAs. JT Lee. Science, 2012
- Genome-wide identification of polycomb-associated RNAs by RIP-seq. J Zhao, T Ohsumi, ... JT Lee. Molecular Cell, 2010
- YY1 tethers Xist RNA to the inactive X nucleation center. Y Jeon, JT Lee. Cell, 2011
- Transient homologous chromosome pairing marks the onset of X inactivation. N Xu, CL Tsai, JT Lee. Science, 2006
- Tsix, a gene antisense to Xist at the X-inactivation centre. JT Lee, LS Davidow, D Warshawsky. Nature Genetics, 1999
- A 450 kb transgene displays properties of the mammalian X-inactivation center. JT Lee, WM Strauss, JA Dausman, R Jaenisch. Cell, 1996

== Awards ==
- 1998 Basil O'Connor Scholar Award
- 2000 Pew Scholar
- 2010 Elected Fellow of the American Association for the Advancement of Science (AAAS)
- 2010 Molecular Biology Award from the National Academy of Sciences
- 2011 NIH MERIT Award
- 2014 Distinguished Graduate Award of the University of Pennsylvania Perelman School of Medicine
- 2015 Elected member of the National Academy of Sciences
- 2016 Centennial Award from GENETICS, Genetics Society of America
- 2016 Lurie Prize in Biomedical Sciences from the Foundation for the National Institutes of Health
- 2018 Harrington Rare Genetic Disease Scholar
