= Don W. Cleveland =

American cancer biologist and neurobiologist

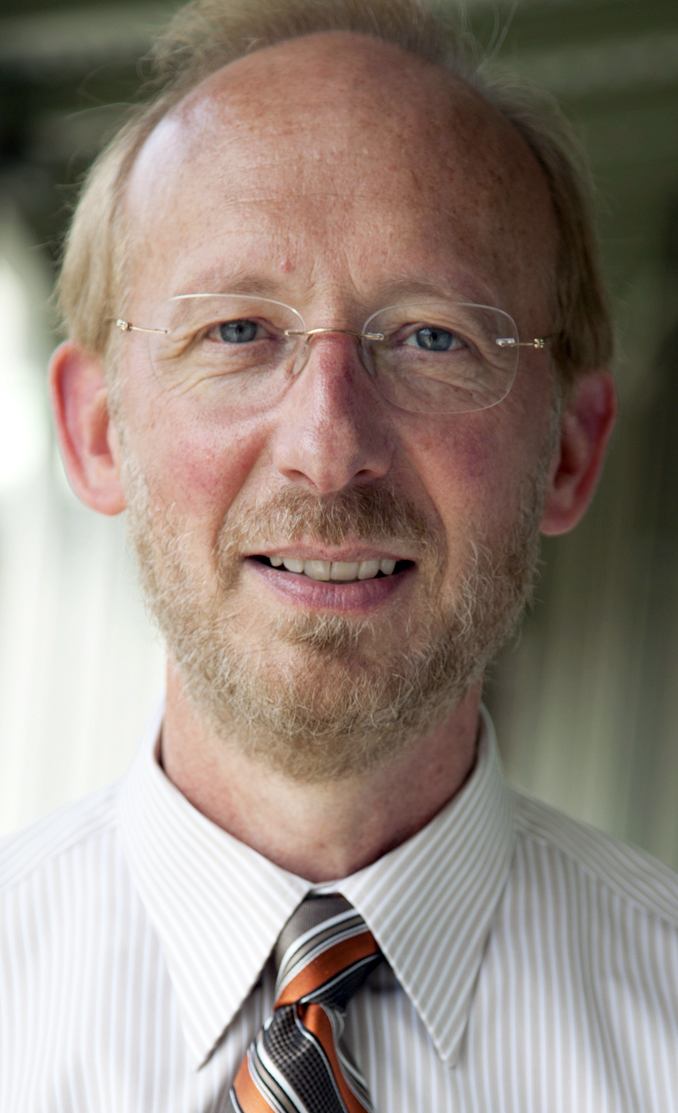
- Cleveland in 2013
- Born: August 26, 1950 (age 76); Waynesville, Missouri
- Education: Princeton University (PhD); New Mexico State University (BS)
- Awards: National Academy of Sciences, 2006; American Academy of Arts and Sciences, 2006; Institute of Medicine, 2012; Breakthrough Prize in Life Sciences, 2018
- Scientific career
- Fields: Centromeres, aneuploidy and tumorigenesis Mechanism and therapy in human neurodegenerative disease
- Workplaces: Ludwig Cancer Research; University of California, San Diego; Johns Hopkins University
- Doctoral advisor: Marc W. Kirschner
- Other academic advisors: William Rutter

Don W. Cleveland (born 1950 in Waynesville, MO) is an American cancer biologist and neurobiologist.

Cleveland is currently the Department Chair of Cellular and Molecular Medicine and Distinguished Professor of Medicine, Cellular and Molecular Medicine and Neurosciences at the University of California, San Diego, and Head, Laboratory for Cell Biology at the San Diego branch of Ludwig Cancer Research.

== Biography ==
Cleveland grew up in Las Cruces, New Mexico. He earned a B.S. in physics in 1972 from New Mexico State University, and graduated as the valedictorian for the College of Arts and Sciences.

Cleveland started graduate school at Princeton University in 1972, switching mid-year into biochemistry. He worked with Marc Kirschner and graduated with a Ph.D. in 1977. Cleveland's doctoral dissertation was titled "Purification and properties of tau, a microtubule associated protein which induces assembly of microtubules from purified tubulin". As a graduate student, Cleveland provided the initial identification and characterization of tau, showing it to have characteristics of a natively unfolded protein. Tau is now recognized to accumulate in Alzheimer's disease and to be the basis for chronic brain injury. He also developed and published a peptide fingerprinting technique that was so popular that it became a citation classic Cleveland did postdoctoral work with William J. Rutter at the University of California, San Francisco from 1978 to 1981. Cleveland was the first to clone tubulin actin and keratin

From 1981 through 1995, Cleveland was on the faculty of the Department of Biological Chemistry at the Johns Hopkins University School of Medicine. In 1995, he accepted a position at the San Diego Branch of Ludwig Cancer Research at the University of California, San Diego. Since 2008, he has been Chair of the Department of Cellular and Molecular Medicine.

== Contributions to Science ==
Cleveland has made pioneering discoveries of the mechanisms of chromosome movement and cell-cycle control during normal cellular division, as well as of the principles of neuronal cell development and their relationship to the defects that contribute to inherited neurodegenerative disease. Cleveland's research looks at the molecular genetics of axonal growth and motor neuron disease and the cell biology of mammalian chromosome movement.

Most recently, his research has achieved a significant breakthrough in treating Huntington's disease, an inherited and degenerative brain disorder for which there is no cure. A one-time injection of a new DNA-based drug treatment - known as ASO (short for antisense oligonucleotide) - blocked the activity of the gene whose mutation causes the disease. A single treatment silenced the mutated gene responsible for the disease, slowing and partially reversing progression of the fatal neurodegenerative disorder in animal models. This drug, called IONIS-HTTRx, was developed by scientists at Ionis Pharmaceuticals in collaboration with partners CHDI Foundation, Roche Pharmaceuticals and academic collaborators at University of California, San Diego. The Phase 3 clinical trial was recently halted for lack of efficacy.

== Books ==
Cell and Molecular Biology of the Cytoskeleton: Molecular Mechanisms Controlling Tubulin Synthesis Edited by Jerry W. Shay (Plenum Press, 1986), ISBN 978-1-4612-9269-2

With Toni L. Williamson, Mouse Models in the Study of Genetic Neurological Disorders: Mouse Models of Amyotrophic Lateral Sclerosis Edited by Brian Popko (Kluwer Academic/Plenum Publishers, 1999), ISBN 0-306-45965-5

With Nicholas G. Theodorakis, Control of Messenger RNA Stability: Translationally Coupled Degradation of Tubulin mRNA Edited by Joel Belasco and George Brawerman (Academic Press, Inc., 1993) ISBN 0-12-084782-5

== Selected honors ==
- Elected Member, National Academy of Sciences, 2006
- Elected Member, Institute of Medicine (IOM), 2012
- Elected Fellow, American Academy of Arts and Sciences, 2006
- Elected Fellow, American Academy of Microbiology, 2006
- Elected Fellow, American Association for the Advancement of Science (AAAS), 2009
- President, American Society for Cell Biology, 2013
- Sheila Essey Prize, American Academy of Neurology, April 1999
- Outstanding Scientist Award, Playing to Win for Life Foundation, September 2004
- Wings Over Wall Street and MDA Outstanding Scientist, October 2007
- 2012 Research Award, The Huntington's Disease Society of America
- Katharine Berkan Judd Award, Memorial Sloan Kettering, 2012
- The Ricketts Award, University of Chicago, 2012
- The Gerson Distinguished Scholar Award, Univ. of Pittsburgh, 2014
- Essey Prize for ALS Research, The ALS Association, 2014
- UCSD Chancellor's Award for Excellence in Postdoctoral Scholar Mentoring, 2014
- Thomas Reuters' 2015 listing of "The World's Most Influential Scientific Minds" 2015
- Breakthrough Prize in Life Sciences, 2018
- NOMIS Distinguished Scientist Awardee, 2018
- ASCB E.B. Wilson Medal, 2022
