= C. Frank Bennett =

American pharmacologist

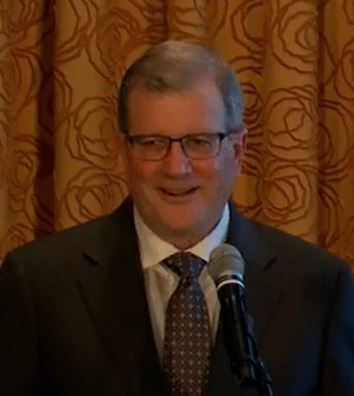
- Bennett in 2018
- Education: University of New Mexico; Baylor College of Medicine
- Awards: Breakthrough Prize in Life Sciences (2019)
- Scientific career
- Fields: Pharmacology
- Workplaces: Ionis Pharmaceuticals

C. Frank Bennett is an American pharmacologist. Bennett is currently the Senior Vice President of Research and Neurology Franchise Leader at Ionis Pharmaceuticals. He is a 2019 Breakthrough Prize winner in Life Sciences, which he shared with his collaborator Adrian R. Krainer for the development of an effective antisense oligonucleotide therapy for children with the neurodegenerative disease spinal muscular atrophy.

== Early life and education ==
C. Frank Bennett grew up in Aztec, New Mexico, where his family owned a small hotel. Bennett holds a bachelor's degree in Pharmacy from the University of New Mexico and obtained a PhD in Pharmacology in 1985 from Baylor College of Medicine. Bennett completed a postdoctoral fellowship at SmithKline & French Laboratories with Stanley T. Crooke.

== Career ==
Bennett is one of the founding members of Ionis Pharmaceuticals in Carlsbad, California. He has been involved in the development of antisense oligonucleotides as therapeutic agents, including research on the application of oligonucleotides for inflammatory diseases and cancer, oligonucleotide delivery, pharmacokinetics and medicinal chemistry. Notably, Bennett led the development of antisense technology for the treatment of neurological diseases, including nusinersen, a treatment for Spinal Muscular Atrophy, and several antisense drugs in clinical trials for Huntington's disease, Alzheimer's disease and amyotrophic lateral sclerosis (ALS). Bennett has published more than 200 papers on antisense technology and has more than 175 issued U.S. Patents. Bennett was the co-recipient of the 2019 Breakthrough Prize in Life Sciences and the recipient of the Leslie Gehry Brenner Prize for Innovation in Science awarded by the Hereditary Disease Foundation (2018).
