= Sabine Hadida =

Chemist

- Education: University of Barcelona
- Occupation: Senior Vice President
- Employer: Vertex Pharmaceuticals
- Known for: Research in cystic fibrosis

Sabine Hadida is a pharmacologist and senior vice president at Vertex Pharmaceuticals. She works at Vertex's cystic fibrosis research center in San Diego. She was awarded the Breakthrough Prize in Life Sciences in 2024.

== Education ==
Hadida has a bachelor's degree, master's degree, and PhD in Pharmacy from the University of Barcelona, Spain. She worked as a postdoctoral fellow at the University of Pittsburgh studying fluorous chemistry.

== Career ==
Hadida worked as a research scientist at CombiChem Inc. before she joined Vertex Pharmaceuticals in 2002 and moved to the company’s San Diego office as Site Lead in 2022. At Vertex Pharmaceuticals, Hadida led the chemistry team to work on drug treatments for cystic fibrosis and pain.

== Awards and recognition ==
Hadida is the recipient of the 2022 Drug Hunter Award, the 2019 Distinguished Scientist Award by the American Chemistry Society, San Diego Chapter, and the 2013 American Chemistry Society Heroes of Chemistry award.

In September 2023, she received the 2024 Breakthrough Prize in Life Sciences alongside Paul Negulescu and Frederick Van Goor for developing treatment for cystic fibrosis.
