= Alberto Ascherio =

- Born: 1953 (age 72–73); Italy
- Education: University of Milan, Harvard University
- Scientific career
- Fields: Epidemiology, Nutrition, Neurology
- Workplaces: Harvard T.H. Chan School of Public Health, Harvard Medical School

Alberto Ascherio (born 1953) is an Italian-American physician, epidemiologist, and nutritionist. He is a Professor of Epidemiology and Nutrition at the Harvard T.H. Chan School of Public Health and a Professor of Medicine at Harvard Medical School. He is widely recognized for his research linking the Epstein-Barr virus (EBV) to multiple sclerosis (MS).

== Early life and education ==
Ascherio was born in Italy and received his Doctor of Medicine and Surgery degree from the University of Milan in 1978. After practicing medicine and engaging in public health in Africa and Latin America, he earned his Master of Public Health (MPH) and Doctor of Public Health (DrPH) degrees from Harvard University.

== Career ==
Ascherio has dedicated his career to researching neurodegenerative diseases, particularly multiple sclerosis, Parkinson's disease, and amyotrophic lateral sclerosis (ALS). His work extensively utilizes longitudinal cohort studies such as the Nurses' Health Study, Health Professionals Follow-up Study, and international cohorts from Denmark and Finland.

== Research contributions ==
=== Multiple sclerosis and Epstein-Barr virus ===
In a landmark 2022 study published in Science, Ascherio and colleagues analyzed data from over 10 million U.S. military personnel over two decades, showing a 32-fold increased risk of MS following EBV infection, indicating EBV as a likely leading cause of MS. This finding has significant implications for MS prevention and treatment.

=== Parkinson's disease ===
Ascherio's research also includes studies on dietary and environmental influences on Parkinson's disease. He has published findings suggesting that dietary flavonoids may reduce Parkinson’s disease risk in men.

=== Vitamin D and neurological health ===
Ascherio’s work includes pivotal studies linking vitamin D levels with MS disease progression. He advocates vitamin D supplementation to manage MS disease activity.

== Awards and honors ==
In recognition of his research, Ascherio shared the 2025 Breakthrough Prize in Life Sciences with Stephen L. Hauser for establishing EBV infection as a key cause of MS.

== Selected publications ==
- Munger KL, Levin LI, Hollis BW, Howard NS, Ascherio A. "Serum 25-hydroxyvitamin D levels and risk of multiple sclerosis." JAMA. 2006;296(23):2832–2838.
- Gao X, Cassidy A, Schwarzschild MA, Rimm EB, Ascherio A. "Habitual intake of dietary flavonoids and risk of Parkinson disease." Neurology. 2012;78(15):1138-1145.
