= Vamsi Mootha =

American biologist

Vamsi K. Mootha
- Born: Kakinada, Andhra Pradesh, India
- Citizenship: United States
- Education: M.D.
- Alma mater: Stanford University; Harvard–MIT Division of Health Sciences and Technology
- Occupation: Professor
- Employer(s): Howard Hughes Medical Institute; Massachusetts General Hospital; Harvard Medical School

Vamsi K. Mootha is an Indian American physician–scientist and computational biologist. He is an Investigator of the Howard Hughes Medical Institute, Professor of Systems Biology and Medicine at Harvard Medical School, Investigator in the Department of Molecular Biology at Massachusetts General Hospital. He is also an Institute Member of the Broad Institute.

Mootha and his research group have made major contributions to mitochondrial biology and genomics. His group characterized the mammalian mitochondrial proteome and has produced a widely utilized reference protein atlas called MitoCarta. He and his clinical collaborators pioneered the use of targeted next-generation sequencing of these proteins to identify the Mendelian genetic basis of dozens of mitochondrial disorders. His team used "integrative genomics" to identify all of the molecular components of the mitochondrial calcium uniporter, a key channel of communication between the organelle and the rest of the cell. His team used genomics to make the unexpected discovery that in animal models, low oxygen can alleviate mitochondrial disease. As a postdoctoral fellow he developed Gene Set Enrichment Analysis, an algorithm that is widely used in genomics and has been implemented into a popular software tool.

Mootha graduated from Kelly High School in Beaumont, Texas. As a high school student he won first place in the mathematics category of the International Science and Engineering Fair. He received his BS in Mathematical and Computational Science from Stanford University and his M.D. from Harvard University in the Harvard–MIT Division of Health Sciences and Technology. He completed his internship and residency in internal medicine at Brigham and Women's Hospital in Boston, and then pursued postdoctoral training with Eric Lander at the Whitehead Institute/MIT Center for Genome Research.

He is a 2004 recipient of the Macarthur Foundation "genius award" for developing computational methods for integrative genomics. He received the 2008 Daland Prize from the American Philosophical Society; the 2014 Keilin Medal from the Biochemical Society; a 2014 Padma Shri Award from the Republic of India, the fourth highest civilian award given by the Indian government and the 2016 King Faisal Prize in Science. He was elected to the United States National Academy of Sciences in 2014 and the National Academy of Medicine in 2021. In 2023 he was awarded the Lurie Prize in Biomedical Sciences.
