= Andrew Singleton =

British neurogeneticist

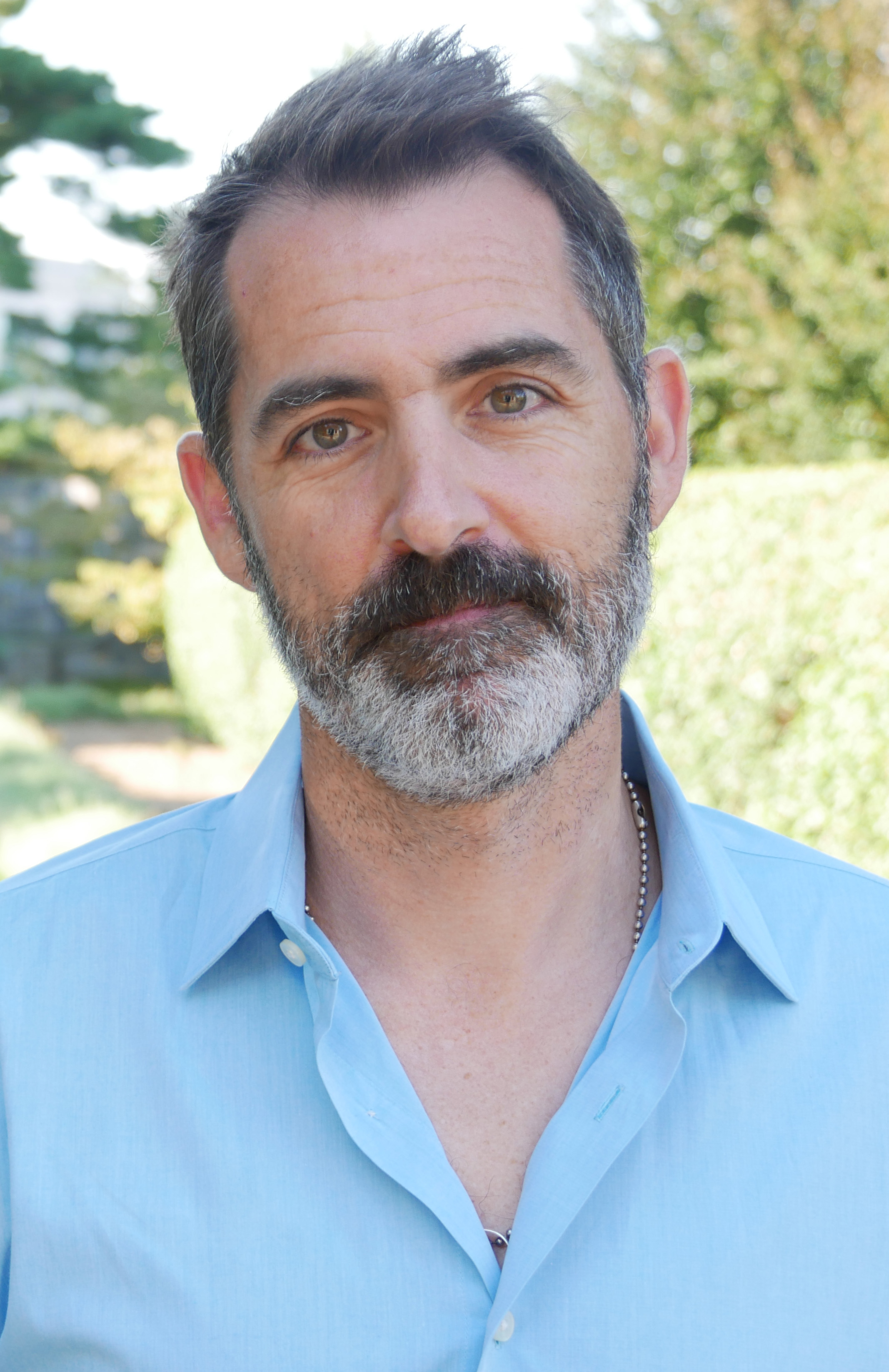
- Born: Andrew B. Singleton; 1972 (age 53–54); Guernsey, the Channel Islands
- Known for: Parkinson's disease research
- Scientific career
- Fields: Neuroscience

Andrew B. Singleton is a British neurogeneticist currently working in the USA. He was born in Guernsey, the Channel Islands in 1972, where he lived until he was 18 years old. His secondary education was conducted at the Guernsey Grammar School. He earned a first class degree in Applied Physiology from Sunderland University and his PhD in neuroscience from the University of Newcastle upon Tyne where he studied the genetics of Alzheimer's disease and other dementias at the Medical Research Council (MRC) Neurochemical Pathology Unit. He moved to the United States in 1999, where he began working at the Mayo Clinic in Jacksonville, Florida studying the genetic basis of Parkinson's disease, ataxia, and dystonia. He moved to the National Institutes of Health in 2001 to head the newly formed Molecular Genetics unit within the Laboratory of Neurogenetics. In 2006 he took over as Chief of the Laboratory of Neurogenetics and became an NIH Distinguished Investigator in the intramural program at the National Institute on Aging (NIA) in 2017. In 2020 he stepped down as the Chief of the Laboratory of Neurogenetics and became the Acting Director of the newly formed Center for Alzheimer's and Related Dementias at the NIA (CARD ). In 2021 he became the Director of CARD.

== Accomplishments ==
Dr. Singleton is best known for his work aimed at understanding the genetic etiology of Parkinson's disease. His first well-known work described the discovery of a triplication mutation of the alpha-synuclein gene that causes a severe, early-onset form of Parkinson's disease. One year later he led the group that was the first to identify mutations in the LRRK2 gene as a cause of familial Parkinson's disease, as well as the more common, sporadic Parkinson's disease. Since then, his laboratory has focused more on the complex genetics of Parkinson's disease, describing more than 90 common genetic risk factors for this disease. To date he has published more than 700 scientific articles.

== Awards and honours ==
- Boehringer Mannheim Research Award in 2005
- Annemarie Opprecht Award in 2008
- NIH Directors Award in 2008 and 2016
- First Recipient of the Jay van Andel Award for Outstanding Achievement in Parkinson's Disease Research, presented at the Van Andel Institute in 2012
- Named as an NIH Distinguished Investigator in 2017
- American Academy of Neurology Movement Disorders Award for Lifetime Achievement in 2017
- Honorary Doctorate of Sciences from the University of Sunderland in 2017
- NIA Directors Award for Mentoring in 2019
- Robert A. Pritzker Prize for Leadership in Parkinson's Disease Research
- He serves on the editorial boards of the journals Brain, Lancet Neurology, Neurogenetics, Journal of Parkinson's Disease, Journal of Huntington's Disease, npj Parkinson's Disease, and Neurodegenerative Diseases
- He is Associate Editor for Genetics at the journals npj Parkinson's Disease and Movement Disorders
- Scientific Advisory Board of the Lewy Body Dementia Association
- Breakthrough Prize in Life Sciences in 2024
- Elected Fellow of the Royal Society in 2025
