= Immunochemistry =

Study of the chemistry of the immune system

Immunochemistry is the study of the chemistry of the immune system. This involves the study of the properties, functions, interactions and production of the chemical components of the immune system. It also include immune responses and determination of immune materials/products by immunochemical assays.

In addition, immunochemistry is the study of the identities and functions of the components of the immune system. Immunochemistry is also used to describe the application of immune system components, in particular antibodies, to chemically labelled antigen molecules for visualization.

Various methods in immunochemistry have been developed and refined, and used in scientific study, from virology to molecular evolution. Immunochemical techniques include: enzyme-linked immunosorbent assay, immunoblotting (e.g., Western blot assay), precipitation and agglutination reactions, immunoelectrophoresis, immunophenotyping, immunochromatographic assay and flow cytometry.

One of the earliest examples of immunochemistry is the Wasserman test to detect syphilis. Svante Arrhenius was also one of the pioneers in the field; he published Immunochemistry in 1907 which described the application of the methods of physical chemistry to the study of the theory of toxins and antitoxins.

Immunochemistry is also studied from the aspect of using antibodies to label epitopes of interest in cells (immunocytochemistry) or tissues (immunohistochemistry).

Recently considering its broad biomedical scope and the dynamics of health sciences, it was proposed that immunochemistry should be redefined as; "Immunochemistry is an interdisciplinary scientific field that examines and applies the chemical and structural principles governing immune system interactions, including antigen–antibody and receptor–ligand processes, while integrating molecular engineering, computational modelling, and systems-level analysis to advance diagnostics, therapeutics, and biomedical innovation."

Chemical Components of the Immune System

Chemical Component	Produced By	Function
Cytokines	T cells, macrophages	Immune signaling
Antibodies	Plasma cells	Neutralization of Pathogen
Complement proteins	Liver	Pathogen lysis, opsonization
Acute-phase proteins	Liver	Inflammation, opsonization
Chemokines	Immune cells	Recruitment of Cell
Histamine	Mast cells	Vasodilation
Prostaglandins	Macrophages	Inflammation, pain
