= Morris Silverman (philanthropist) =

Morris "Marty" Silverman (1912–2006) was an American philanthropist and businessman who donated millions of dollars to causes worldwide, mainly in health and science sectors.

He was born and raised in Troy, New York, where he also opened a gas station which he successfully used to help pay for his college tuition. After attending New York University and Albany Law School he moved to New York City with his wife, Dorothy (who died in 1985), to go into business. He joined the U.S. Army and became a Major during World War II, earning two Purple Hearts, a Silver Star, two Bronze Star Medals, four Battle Stars, and a Combat Infantryman Badge.

Most of his money came from selling his company, National Equipment Rental, which he started after returning home from World War II. He sold the company in 1984 after it grew to be the largest privately held leasing company in America. After selling the company he founded the Marty and Dorothy Silverman Foundation.

One of his largest contributions was a $50 million pledge to found the Albany Medical Center Prize in Medicine and Biomedical Research.

== Marty and Dorothy Silverman Foundation ==
The Marty and Dorothy Silverman foundation is a 501(c)(3) (Non-profit) organization founded in 1986 with $40 million Morris Silverman received from selling his company, National Equipment Rental. In 2005 the foundation was worth $351,241,274 and had awarded a total of $6,876,470 in grants.
Its stated objectives include:

"Support for programs that address the special needs of indigent senior citizens, including nursing homes and hospitals. Grants may also be made to educational and cultural organizations, and health and welfare agencies."

== Albany Medical Center Prize in Medicine and Biomedical Research ==
From its website:

"The Albany Medical Center Prize serves to encourage and recognize extraordinary and sustained contributions to improving health care and promoting innovative biomedical research.

Awarded annually, the $500,000 prize is the largest prize in medicine in the United States and is bestowed to any physician or scientist, or group, whose work has led to significant advances in the fields of health care and scientific research with demonstrated translational benefits applied to improved patient care.

The prize is a legacy to its founder - the late Morris "Marty" Silverman. At the inaugural awards ceremony in Albany, NY in March 2001, Albany Medical Center Prize founder Marty Silverman started a tradition that will be carried on for the duration of the Prize - 100 years. Marty's promise was to light one candle each year to honor that year's recipient."

[1]

The Albany Medical Center Prize in Medicine and Biomedical Research is the second largest prize award in the world, next to the $1.3 million Nobel Prize.

== Sources ==
- http://www.amc.edu/Academic/AlbanyPrize/
- https://web.archive.org/web/20080517124359/http://www.albany.edu/giving/gifts_at_work_archive.htm
- "Paid Notice: Deaths SILVERMAN, MORRIS". The New York Times. January 31, 2006.
- "Paid Notice: Deaths SILVERMAN, MARTY". The New York Times. January 29, 2006.
- http://foundationcenter.org/pnd/news/story.jhtml?id=130000006
