= Stephen L. Hauser =

American physician (born 1949)

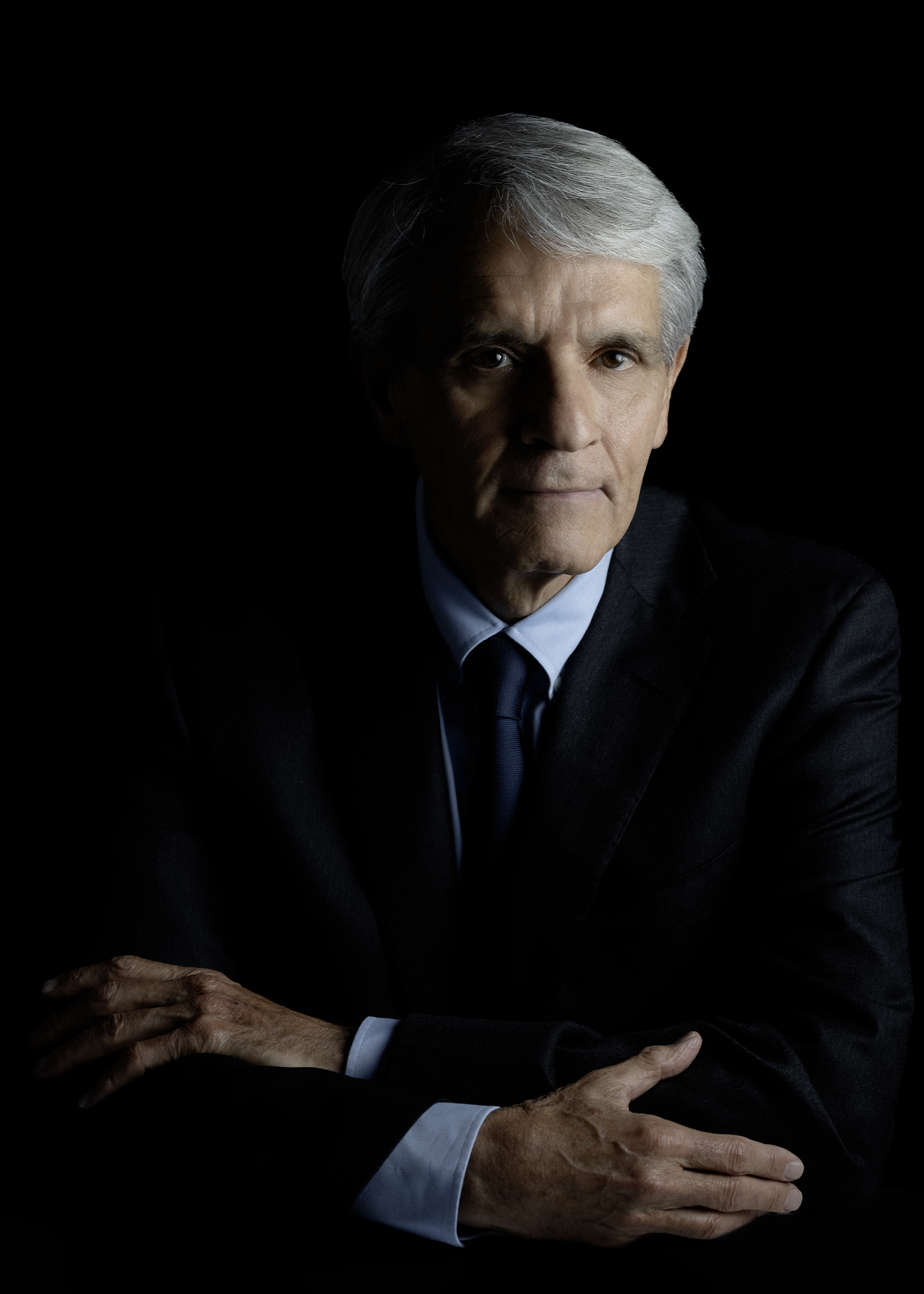
- Born: December 14, 1949 (age 76); New York, New York, U.S.
- Education: Harvard Medical School (MD)
- Known for: multiple sclerosis research bioethics
- Awards: John Dystel Prize for Multiple Sclerosis Research (2008); Charcot Award (2013); Breakthrough Prize in Life Sciences
- Scientific career
- Fields: Neurology, neuroimmunology
- Workplaces: University of California, San Francisco

Stephen L. Hauser is an American neurologist and neuroimmunologist. He is the Robert A. Fishman Distinguished Professor of Neurology at the University of California, San Francisco (UCSF), and Director of the UCSF Weill Institute for Neurosciences. His research has led to key discoveries on the genetic basis, immune mechanisms, and treatment of multiple sclerosis (MS), most notably the development of B cell therapies for MS patients, a powerful class of therapeutics that treat all forms of the disease, including the first therapy of proven efficacy for progressive MS. In 2025, he shared the Breakthrough Prize in Life Sciences with Alberto Ascherio for transforming the understanding and treatment of multiple sclerosis.

== Research ==
Hauser is a principal investigator of a multinational effort to identify genetic effects on MS. He is part of the team that identified that humoral immune mechanisms are important in the pathogenesis of MS lesions, leading to the development of B-cell based therapies for MS. He has contributed to the establishment of nationwide and international genetics consortia that have identified more than 50 gene variants that contribute to MS risk.

Using comparative genomics between African-American and Caucasian MS populations, Hauser's group was able to identify HLA-DRB1 as the primary MS signal in the major histocompatibility complex (MHC), and also fine map other secondary loci in this region.

In 2007, as a senior organizer of the International Multiple Sclerosis Genetics Consortium (IMSGC), he helped identify the first two non-HLA genes involved in MS susceptibility, IL-2R (CD25) and IL-7R (CD127).

In 2010, his laboratory published the complete genome sequences and the epigenome of identical twins discordant for MS. By mid-2011 more than fifty MS-associated risk alleles were identified, and by now nearly the entire array of common variants associated with MS susceptibility have been mapped.

Hauser has also focused on the role of the B cell and immunoglobulin in the pathogenesis of the disease. He developed and characterized an MS disease model that replicated the core feature of vesicular demyelination previously observed in MS, and demonstrated that this pathology resulted from the synergistic effects of autoreactive T-cells and pathogenic autoantibodies. In 1999 he published work identifying specific myelin reactivity of these autoantibodies deposited in areas of myelin damage in MS brains.

Hauser has contributed to the development of B-cell–targeted therapies for multiple sclerosis (MS). He led a clinical trial investigating rituximab, a monoclonal antibody targeting CD20+ B cells, which demonstrated efficacy in relapsing-remitting MS. A subsequent trial in primary progressive MS suggested that rituximab may be beneficial in a subset of patients with evidence of active inflammation. A related trial using ocrelizumab, a humanized anti-CD20 antibody, reported similar findings in relapsing-remitting MS.

Hauser has also participated in efforts to apply precision medicine to MS. As part of this work, he co-developed the MS BioScreen, a data integration tool designed to support individualized monitoring and decision-making in MS care.

== Service ==
Since 2016, Hauser has served as director of the UCSF Weill Institute for Neurosciences, an umbrella organization that links the clinical and basic neurosciences at UCSF to accelerate research against neurologic diseases. Previously, he served as chair of the Department of Neurology at UCSF from 1992–2017.

From 2010–2017 he served on the Presidential Commission for the Study of Bioethical Issues for the Obama administration, charged with advising the President on bioethical issues arising from advances in biomedicine and related areas of science and technology. He also served as Chair of the Committee on Gulf War and Health Outcomes for the National Academy of Medicine (formerly Institute of Medicine), and later as Chair of the Research Advisory Committee for the U.S. Department of Veterans Affairs.

He is currently an editor of the textbook Harrison's Principles of Internal Medicine and past editor-in-chief of the Annals of Neurology.

== Education ==
Hauser is a graduate of the Massachusetts Institute of Technology and Harvard Medical School. He trained in internal medicine at the New York Hospital-Cornell Medical Center, in neurology at the Massachusetts General Hospital, and in immunology at Harvard Medical School and the Institute Pasteur in Paris, France, and was a faculty member at Harvard Medical School before moving to UCSF.

== Awards and honors ==
Hauser is recipient of the Javits Neuroscience Investigator Award. He received the John Dystel Prize for Multiple Sclerosis Research in 2008, and Charcot Award in 2013, for his earlier studies on MS genetic susceptibility and role of immune B cells in MS. He later received the Taubman Prize for Excellence in Translational Medical Research in 2017, and Scientific Breakthrough Award in 2022, for his career research advances leading to development of B cell therapies in MS.

He is a fellow and past president of the American Neurological Association, American Academy of Arts and Sciences, American Academy of Physicians, and member of the National Academy of Medicine.
