= Adrian Krainer (scientist) =

Uruguayan neuroscientist

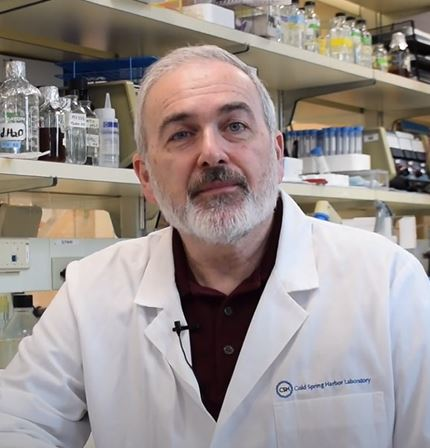
- Krainer in 2018
- Born: Adrian Robert Krainer; Montevideo, Uruguay
- Education: Columbia University (BA); Harvard University (PhD)
- Known for: RNA splicing
- Spouse: Kate Krainer
- Children: 3
- Awards: Breakthrough Prize in Life Sciences (2019); Member of the National Academy of Sciences (2020); Wolf Prize in Medicine (2021); Albany Medical Center Prize (2024)
- Scientific career
- Workplaces: Cold Spring Harbor Laboratory; Stony Brook University
- Thesis: Nuclear pre-mRNA splicing in vitro (1986)
- Notable students: Ewan Birney
- Website: www.cshl.edu/research/faculty-staff/adrian-r-krainer

Adrian Robert Krainer is a Uruguayan-American biochemist and molecular geneticist known for his research into RNA gene-splicing. He helped create a drug for patients with spinal muscular atrophy. Krainer holds the St. Giles Foundation Professorship at Cold Spring Harbor Laboratory in Laurel Hollow, New York.

== Early life and education ==
Krainer was born in Montevideo, Uruguay to a Jewish family of Hungarian and Romanian descent. He has one older brother, who is a chemical engineer. His father did forced labor for two years in a Romanian labor camp (Ferma Alba) during World War II. After the war, his father's original surname, Kreiner changed to Krainer due to a clerical error when he was a refugee in Italy. His parents owned a small leather business in Montevideo. Krainer attended a private bilingual French-Spanish elementary school. He later attended a public school for two years before completing his pre-college education with four years at a private Spanish-Hebrew school. Krainer lived through political unrest during his teenage years, including urban guerrilla and military dictatorship. Krainer received a full scholarship from Columbia University and completed a Bachelor of Arts degree in Biochemistry in 1981. He graduated cum laude and Phi Beta Kappa. In 1986, he earned a Doctor of Philosophy degree in biochemistry from Harvard University.

== Career and research ==
From 1986 to 1989, Krainer conducted postdoctoral research as the first Cold Spring Harbor Fellow at the Cold Spring Harbor Laboratory. Krainer worked as an assistant professor from 1989 to 1990, Associate Professor from 1990 to 1994, and Professor since 1994. Krainer is a faculty member of the graduate programs in Genetics, Molecular and Cellular Biology, and Molecular Genetics and Microbiology at State University of New York, Stony Brook. Krainer holds the St. Giles Foundation Professorship at Cold Spring Harbor Laboratory. His former students include Ewan Birney. Krainer is a co-founder and Director of Stoke Therapeutics, based in Bedford, MA.

=== Awards and honors ===
In 2019 he was awarded a Breakthrough Prize in Life Sciences for his contributions to the understanding of the RNA gene-splicing process and, in collaboration with fellow Prize Laureate Dr. Frank Bennet of Ionis Pharmaceuticals, the development of medical interventions that target the RNA-splicing process, including Spinraza, which is the first treatment for the genetic disorder Spinal Muscular Atrophy. In 2021 Krainer received the Wolf Prize in Medicine. In 2024 he was awarded the Albany Medical Center Prize jointly with Howard Y. Chang and Lynne E. Maquat.

Other honors include:

- Pew Scholar in the Biomedical Sciences (1992–96);
- National Institute of General Medical Sciences MERIT Award (2012-2022);
- New York Intellectual Property Law Association Inventor of the Year Award (2017);
- FE Bennett Award of the American Neurological Association (2017);
- RNA Society Lifetime Achievement Award (2019);
- Ross Prize in Molecular Medicine (2020);
- Gregor Johann Mendel Medal for Outstanding Achievements in Science (2020), Brno, Czech Republic;
- Fellow of the American Academy of Arts & Sciences (2016);
- Fellow of the National Academy of Inventors (2018);
- Member of the National Academy of Medicine (2019);
- Member of the National Academy of Sciences (2020)

== Personal life ==
Krainer's father and maternal grandparents were Holocaust refugees. He has three children, Emily, Andrew, and Brian. His wife, Kate Krainer, is a plant geneticist.
