= Cameron Prize for Therapeutics of the University of Edinburgh =

Medicine award

The Cameron Prize for Therapeutics of the University of Edinburgh is awarded by the College of Medicine and Veterinary Medicine to a person who has made any highly important and valuable addition to practical therapeutics (Note: Practical therapeutics is the medical treatment and care of an injured patient to combat pain, suffering and disease. In the modern sense it is the science of medicine. The term originates from the Greek word "therapeutikos" meaning to "inclined to serve".) in the previous five years. The prize, which may be awarded biennially, was founded in 1878 by Andrew Robertson Cameron of Richmond, New South Wales, with a sum of £2,000. The University's senatus academicus may require the prizewinner to deliver one or more lectures or to publish an account on the addition made to practical therapeutics. A list of recipients of the prize dates back to 1879.

== Cameron Prize Recipients ==
Year	Image	Laureate	Institution	Interest	Ref
1879		Paul Bert	Faculty of Sciences, Paris The Sorbonne	Decompression sickness, toxicity of high concentrations of oxygen	
1880		William Roberts	Owens College, Manchester	Discovered the antibacterial effects of penicillium moulds, coined the word "enzyme"	
1889		Louis Pasteur	Pasteur Institute	Principles of vaccination, first vaccines for rabies and anthrax, microbial fermentation, pasteurization first resolution of optical isomers	
1890		Joseph Lister	King's College Hospital, London	Pioneer of antiseptic surgery	
1891		David Ferrier	King's College Hospital, London	Cortical localisation	
1893		Victor Horsley	National Hospital for Paralysis and Epilepsy	Developed the Horsley–Clarke apparatus, stereotactic neurosurgery, epilepsy	
1894		Emil von Behring	University of Marburg, Marburg, Germany	Diphtheria antitoxin	
1896		William Macewen	University of Glasgow	Aseptic procedures in the operating theatre, a pioneer of brain surgery and for the development of a number of successful operating techniques and procedures in bone surgery	
1897		Thomas Fraser	Department of Materia Medica Edinburgh	Introduced strophanthus and physostigmine	
1898		Sydney Copeman	Ministry of Health. UK	Authority on vaccination	
1899		David Bruce	Netley Hospital at Netley, UK	Investigated brucellosis and trypanosomes, identifying the cause of African trypanosomiasis (sleeping sickness)	
1900		Waldemar Haffkine	Pasteur Institute in Paris	Vaccines against cholera and bubonic plague	
1901		Patrick Manson	The London School of Hygiene & Tropical Medicine	Discoveries in parasitology and a founder of the field of tropical medicine	
1902		Ronald Ross	University College, Liverpool, United Kingdom	Malaria, by which he showed how it enters the organism. Won Nobel Prize in 1902	
1904		Niels Ryberg Finsen	Copenhagen University Hospital	Treatment of lupus vulgaris with concentrated light radiation. Won Nobel Prize in 1903	
1910		August Bier	Charité - Universitätsmedizin, Berlin	Spinal anesthesia using cocaine and intravenous regional anesthesia	
1911		Simon Flexner	Rockefeller Institute for Medical Research	Studies into poliomyelitis and the development of serum treatment for meningitis	
1914		Paul Ehrlich	Frankfurt University, Germany	Hematology, immunology, and antimicrobial chemotherapy, discovered arsphenamine (Salvarsan), the first effective medicinal treatment for syphilis, concept of a silver bullet. Nobel Prize in 1908	
1915		Thomas Lauder Brunton	St. Bartholomew's Hospital, London	Use of amyl nitrite to treat angina pectoris, dissertation on digitalis	
1920		Robert Jones	Military orthopaedic hospital at Liverpool	Radiography in orthopaedics, described the Jones fracture.	
1921		Jules Bordet	Université Libre de Bruxelles	Development of serological tests for syphilis, isolated Bordetella pertussis in pure culture in 1906 and posited it as the cause of whooping cough. Nobel Prize 1921.	
1922		Frederick Hopkins	University of Cambridge	Discovery of growth-stimulating vitamins, the amino acid tryptophan and the discovery and characterization of glutathione. Nobel Prize 1929.	
1923		J J R Macleod	University of Toronto	Isolation of insulin, Nobel Prize 1923	
1924		Harvey Cushing	Harvard Medical School	Cushing's disease	
1925		Rudolf Magnus	University Medical Center Utrecht	Diuretic effect of the excretions of the pituitary gland, the reflexes involved in mammal posture, studied the effects of narcotics and poison gasses on the lungs	
1926		Henry Hallett Dale	National Institute for Medical Research	Study of acetylcholine as agent in the chemical transmission of nerve impulses. Nobel Prize 1936	
1927		Frederick Banting	University of Toronto	Treated dogs so that they no longer produced trypsin, insulin could then be extracted and used to treat diabetes. Nobel Prize 1923	
1928		Constantin Levaditi	Carol Davila University of Medicine and Pharmacy	Discovered in the presence of the polio virus in tissues other than nervous and this was the basis for the development of vaccine (by Jonas Salk and Albert Sabin)	
1929		Leonard Rogers	Hospital for Tropical Diseases	Effects of hæmostatic and other drugs on the intravascular coagulability of the blood and treatment of cholera with hypertonic saline, worked on Entamoeba histolytica, which he correctly associated with both dysentery and hepatic abscess	
1930		George R Minot	Harvard University	Discovered an effective treatment for pernicious anemia. Nobel Prize 1934	
1930		William P. Murphy	Brigham Hospital, Boston	Shared the Nobel Prize in Physiology or Medicine in 1934 with George Minot and George Whipple combined work in devising and treating macrocytic anemia (specifically, pernicious anemia). :iver had been tried on people with pernicious anemia and later were able to isolate Vitamin B12	
1931		Marie Curie	École Normale Supérieure	First woman to win a Nobel Prize with her husband, coined the word "radioactivity", and isolated radium chloride and pure radium. Nobel Prizes 1903 and 1911	
1932		Edward Mellanby	University of Sheffield	Determined that cause of rickets is lack of vitamin D	
1933		Gladys Rowena Henry Dick	University of Chicago	Isolated hemolytic streptococcus, co-developed a vaccine for scarlet fever, and introduced the Dick Test	
1933		George Frederick Dick	University of Chicago	Isolated hemolytic streptococcus, co-developed a vaccine for scarlet fever, and introduced the Dick Test	
1935		Edward Albert Sharpey Schafer	University of Edinburgh	Founder of endocrinology, coined the word "insulin" after theorising that a single substance from the pancreas was responsible for diabetes mellitus. Schafer's method of artificial respiration, introduced the use of suprarenal extract (containing adrenaline as well as other active substances)	
1936		Julius Wagner-Jauregg	Clinic for Psychiatry and Nervous Diseases in Vienna	Introduced malaria inoculation in the treatment of dementia paralytica (neurosyphilis) and research on goiter, cretinism, and iodine. Nobel Prize 1927	
1937		Carl Hamilton Browning	University of Glasgow	Worked in Germany with Paul Ehrlich, discovered the therapeutic qualities of acridine dyes	
1938		James B Collip	McGill University in Montreal	Working with the Toronto group that isolated insulin he prepared a pancreatic extract pure enough to be used in clinical trials, pioneering work with parathyroid hormone. Nobel Prize 1923	
1938		Karl Landsteiner	University of Vienna Rockefeller Institute for Medical Research	Discovered three human blood groups (O, A, and B), the Rhesus factor, and isolated the polio virus. Nobel Prize 1930	
1939		Gerhard Johannes Paul Domagk	Bayer laboratories at Wuppertal	Discoverer of sulfonamidochrysoidine (Prontosil) effective against streptococci, eventually led to the development of the antituberculosis drugs thiosemicarbazone and isoniazid. Nobel Prize 1939, lectured in 1954 (forced until then to decline Nobel Prize)	
1940		Charles Dodds	Courtauld Institute of Biochemistry	Pentose phosphate pathway which generates NADPH, the discovery of stilboestrol, a synthetic and powerfully active non-steroid analogue of the naturally occurring oestrogenic hormone	
1944		Otto Loewi	New York University College of Medicine	Showed Acetylcholine to be released by electrical stimulation of the vagus nerve and augmentation of adrenaline release by cocaine, a connection between digitalis and the action of calcium. Invented the mydriatic test in which an experimental form of diabetes in dogs led a change in the response of the eye to adrenaline. Nobel Prize 1936	
1945		Alexander Fleming	St Mary's Hospital, London	Discovered the enzyme lysozyme in 1923 and the antibiotic substance benzylpenicillin (penicillin G) from the mould Penicillium notatum in 1928. Nobel Prize 1945 with Florey	
1945		Howard Florey	University of Oxford	Carried out the first clinical trials of penicillin in 1941. Nobel Prize 1945 shared with Fleming	
1946		Albert Szent-Györgyi	National Institutes of Health, Bethesda, Maryland	Discovering vitamin C and the components and reactions of the citric acid cycle, identifying fumaric acid and other steps in what became known as the Krebs cycle. Nobel Prize 1937	
1947		Neil Hamilton Fairley	London School of Hygiene and Tropical Medicine	Saved thousands of Allied lives from malaria and other diseases during World War II, researched quinine, sulphonamides, atebrin, plasmoquine, and paludrine	
1948		Edwin B. Astwood	Tufts University School of Medicine, Boston	Hormonal control of the mammary gland, the initial rise in uterine weight in response to estrogen could be suppressed by progesterone and the basic mechanisms of thyroid physiology and assessment of relative potency of antithyroid drugs in man, established rational therapeutic regimens for most thyroid diseases, identification of a third pituitary gonadotropin, which he named luteotrophin.	
1949		Daniel Bovet	University of Rome La Sapienza.	Antihistamines discovered succinylcholine to be a depolarizing muscle relaxant. He also synthesized gallamine, the first completely artificial curariform drug to be clinically useful, work on synthetic analogs of bioactive amines and antihistamines. Nobel Prize 1957.	
1950		Rudolph Albert Peters	Institute of Animal Physiology, Babraham	British Anti-Lewisite (Dimercaprol) and treatment of post-arsphenamine jaundice researched pyruvate metabolism, focussing particularly on the toxicity of fluoroacetate	
1951		Tadeusz Reichstein	Pharmaceutical Institute of the University of Basel	Synthesized vitamin C by what is now called the Reichstein process, isolated aldosterone, a hormone of the adrenal cortex. Nobel Prize 1950 Jointly with Kendall	
1951		E C Kendall	Princeton University	Isolation of thyroxine, the active principle of the thyroid gland, the crystallization of glutathione, the hormones of the cortex of the adrenal glands and the anti-inflammatory effect of cortisone. Nobel Prize 1950	
1954		Russell Claude Brock	Guy's and the Brompton hospitals	Cardiac surgeon, operated on Fallot's tetralogy patients with pulmonary stenosis and mitral stenosis resulting from rheumatic fever, introduced new developments, notably hypothermia and the heart-lung machine	
1956		William D.M. Paton	University of Oxford	Interest in hyperbaric physiology, cholinergic transmission in particular decamethonium and hexamethonium, histamine release by licheniform and other basic substances, mechanism of action of gaseous anaesthetic agents, pharmacology of cannabis, the rate theory of drug action	
1956		Eleanor J Zaimis	The Royal Free Hospital, London	muscle relaxants and ganglionic blockers, the structure-activity relationships of methonium compounds	
1958		Charles B Huggins	University of Chicago	Discovered in 1941 that hormones could be used to control the spread of some cancers, specializing in prostate cancer, castration or estrogen administration led to glandular atrophy, androgen ablation of metastases, development of biomarker based on serum phosphatase. Nobel Prize 1966	
1960		John F Enders	Children's Hospital Boston	In vitro culture of poliovirus, isolated measles virus and began development of measles vaccine and conducted trials on 1,500 intellectually disabled children in New York City and 4,000 children in Nigeria. Nobel Prize 1954	
1962		Alan Sterling Parkes	University College, London	Reproductive biology, research in low-temperature biology leading to the discovery that glycerol protected spermatozoa against damage during freezing and storage at very low temperatures	
1964		Willem J Kolff	University of Utah	Pioneer of hemodialysis for kidney failure and the development of artificial organs, in particular the artificial heart	
1966		Gregory Pincus	Worcester Foundation for Experimental Biology in Shrewsbury, Massachusetts	Confirmed earlier research that progesterone would act as an inhibitor to ovulation, co-inventor the combined oral contraceptive pill, in vitro fertilization in rabbits	
1968		Robert Gwyn Macfarlane	Oxford University	Deciphered the enzymic cascade of blood coagulation and the treatment of haemophilia, studied the venom of many different snakes and isolated the poison of the Russell's Viper	
1970		Georges Mathé	Hôpital Paul-Brousse	Performed the first bone marrow graft and first successful kidney grafts between unrelated donors, the development of several important immunosuppressant molecules such as acriflavine, bestatine, ellipticine, oxaliplatin, triptoreline and vinorelbine	
1972		George H Hitchings	Wellcome Research Laboratories, Tuckahoe, New York	Work included 2,6-diaminopurine (a compound to treat leukemia) and p-chlorophenoxy-2,4-diaminopyrimidine (a folic acid antagonist), new drug therapies for malaria (pyrimethamine), leukemia (6-mercaptopurine and thioguanine), gout (allopurinol), organ transplantation (azathioprine) and bacterial infections (co-trimoxazole (trimethoprim) pointed the way that led to major antiviral drugs for herpes infections (acyclovir) and AIDS (zidovudine). Nobel Prize 1988 shared with Black	
1974		John Charnley	Wrightington Hospital, Lancashire	British orthopaedic surgeon pioneered hip replacement, development of the low friction arthroplasty concept, use of bone cement that acted as a grout rather than glue	
1976		Norman Shumway	Stanford University	Human heart transplant operation, pioneered the use of cyclosporine to prevent rejection.	
1978		Sune K Bergstrom	Karolinska Institute, Stockholm	Succeeded in producing pure prostaglandins and determining the chemical structures of two important examples, PGE and PGF, showed that these are formed through the conversion of unsaturated fatty acids, used to trigger contractions during childbirth, induce abortions, or reduce the risk of gastric ulcer. Nobel Prize 1982 Shared with John Vane	
1980		James Black	King's College Hospital Medical School, London	Developed propranolol, a beta-blocker that has a calming effect on the heart by blocking the receptor for adrenaline, developed cimetidine that suppresses the formation of gastric acid and is used to fight ulcers. Nobel Prize 1988 shared with Hitchings	
1988		Hans W Kosterlitz	University of Aberdeen	Endorphins, used electrically stimulated strip of guinea pig intestine to assess opiate activity in pig brain homogenates.	
1990		Roy Yorke Calne	University of Cambridge	Organ transplantation pioneer, improvement of immunosuppression techniques	
1993		Virgil Craig Jordan	Georgetown University	Discovered the breast cancer prevention properties of tamoxifen, the prevention of multiple diseases in women using his new discovery, selective estrogen receptor modulators (SERMs) raloxifene trial.	
1996		Patrick Humphrey	Glaxo	Pharmacological profile of selective 5-HT 4 receptor agonists, TD-5108, tegaserod, adenosine A1 receptor agonists. 5-HT3 receptor antagonists in the treatment of irritable bowel syndrome, triptans as the most important breakthrough in headache medicine – Sumatriptan, naratriptan, alosetron, ondansetron, vapiprost and salmeterol	
2004		Ravinder Nath Maini	Imperial College School of Medicine	Identified TNF alpha as a key cytokine in rheumatoid arthritis and discoverer of anti-TNF therapy as an effective treatment	
2004		Marc Feldmann	Kennedy Institute of Rheumatology, University of Oxford	Discoverer of anti-TNF therapy as an effective treatment for rheumatoid arthritis and other autoimmune diseases, infliximab and etanercept, treatments for Crohn's disease, ulcerative colitis, ankylosing spondylitis, psoriasis and psoriatic arthritis	
2007		Garret A. FitzGerald	University of Pennsylvania	Prostanoid research, pharmacological inhibition of COXs versus the microsomal PGE synthase– 1, involved in the interdisciplinary PENTACON consortium, integration of basic and clinical research in yeast, mammalian cells, fish, mice and humans with the objective of predicting NSAID efficacy and cardiovascular hazard in patients	
2018		Sally Davies	Chief Medical Officer for England	For her work leading the global response to the threat of antimicrobial resistance.	
2020		Michael Sofia	Arbutus Biopharma	For his work developing Sofosbuvir, and thereby revolutionising the treatment of Hepatitis C infection.	
2022		Katalin Karikó	University of Pennsylvania	For their discoveries concerning nucleoside base modifications that enabled the development of effective mRNA vaccines against COVID-19	
2022		Drew Weissman	University of Pennsylvania	For their discoveries concerning nucleoside base modifications that enabled the development of effective mRNA vaccines against COVID-19	
2024		Ian Frazer	The University of Queensland	For his work on HPV virus-like particles that led to the world’s first vaccine for cervical cancer	
2026		Lotte Bjerre Knudsen	Novo Nordisk	For their development of semaglutide as a transformational treatment for obesity and its (cardio)metabolic complications	
2026		Jesper Lau	Novo Nordisk	For their development of semaglutide as a transformational treatment for obesity and its (cardio)metabolic complications	
2026		Thomas Kruse	Novo Nordisk	For their development of semaglutide as a transformational treatment for obesity and its (cardio)metabolic complications	

== See also ==
- List of medicine awards
