= The Kennedy Trust for Rheumatology Research =

The Kennedy Trust for Rheumatology Research is a registered UK charity which funds the Kennedy Institute as well as a range of individual UK university-based researchers. Its longer-term objective is to "achieve a meaningful impact in the development of cures and preventative treatment for musculoskeletal and related inflammatory diseases".

== Formation of Trust ==
In 1965, Mathilda Kennedy, daughter of Michael Marks and her husband Terence Kennedy, founded the Mathilda and Terence Kennedy Institute of Rheumatology.

The Kennedys became interested in rheumatism after their general practitioner Dr Leslie Lankester was diagnosed with rheumatoid arthritis.

The Kennedy Trust was registered as a charity in 1970.

== Kennedy Institute ==
=== Formation of Institute ===
Mathilda and Terence Kennedy donated £500,000 to found the Kennedy Institute of Rheumatology in Hammersmith, the first institute in the world to be totally dedicated to the causes and cures of rheumatic diseases.

=== Governance ===
The first director of the Kennedy Institute was Professor Dugald Gardner. Succeeding directors included Dr Leonard Glynn, Professor Helen Muir, Professor Ravinder Maini, Professor Marc Feldmann and Professor Fiona Powrie.

=== Development of the Institute ===
In 2000, the institute's staff and research activities were incorporated into Imperial College as a division of its newly formed Faculty of Medicine.

In 2011, the Kennedy Institute became part of the University of Oxford as an independent constituent Institute within the Nuffield Department of Orthopaedics, Rheumatology and Musculoskeletal Science (NDORMS). In 2013 the Institute moved into a new building co-funded by the Kennedy Trust and the University of Oxford.

=== Achievements ===
In the mid-1980s, discoveries made by teams led by Ravinder Maini and Marc Feldmann, led the way to anti-TNF therapy being used as a successful treatment for rheumatoid arthritis.

== Archives ==
The archives of the Kennedy Trust are held at Wellcome Collection (ref no: SA/KET).
