= Michael B. Sporn =

- Born: 15 February 1933; New York, New York
- Died: 29 September 2022 (aged 89)
- Education: Harvard University; University of Rochester
- Spouse(s): Catherine Sporn, 1956-2009
- Children: Thomas, Paul
- Scientific career
- Fields: Drug discovery and development; cancer research and prevention
- Workplaces: Dartmouth Medical School; National Cancer Institute

Michael B. Sporn (February 15, 1933 – September 9, 2022) was an American cancer researcher and professor of pharmacology, toxicology and medicine at Dartmouth Medical School. He is credited with discovering transforming growth factor beta and is recognized for his research into cancer prevention and drug development.

He is noted for coining the term "chemoprevention" and for his advocacy of conceptualizing cancer as a chronic condition and treating it prior to carcinogenesis.

== Early life and education ==
Michael B. Sporn was born in New York city on February 15, 1933, to Sadie and Philip Sporn. He attended high school at the Horace Mann School in the Bronx. He then attended Harvard University, and was accepted to medical school after completing his junior year. He received his MD at the University of Rochester in 1959 with Omega Alpha honors.

== Career and scientific contributions ==
Sporn began his professional career in 1960 at the National Institutes of Health and the National Cancer Institute, where he became Chief of the Lung Cancer Branch in 1970. Discoveries made by the lab during his tenure were credited with establishing the field of retinoids. The term chemoprevention was first proposed by Sporn to describe compounds that can prevent oncogenesis.

In 1978, he was appointed Chief of the Laboratory of Chemoprevention, a position which he held until 1995. His research during this period covered subjects such as the study of nucleic acids, the biochemistry of retinoids, and the study of peptide growth factor which lead to the discovery of transforming growth factor beta along with Anita Roberts.

In 1995, he accepted a professorship at Geisel School of Medicine at Dartmouth College, where his research focused on the design and development of synthetic triterpenoid drugs with applications for cancer and other chronic illnesses. The Sporn Laboratory at Dartmouth synthesized a class of molecules called synthetic oleanane terpenoids, which have applications in both the prevention and treatment of cancer. He also developed a type of ligand known as rexinoids with potential application for gene control related to inflammation, proliferation, and differentiation of cancerous cells.

He is listed as an author on over 600 peer-reviewed research papers and his 1988 research on transforming growth factor beta has been cited more than 1,400 times. He is also listed as an author on 61 US patents and his work has been cited in thousands of other patents.

A number of institutions and organizations funded his work, including the National Institute of Health and the Breast Cancer Research Foundation.

== Contributions to drug development ==
Sporn's work has been recognized as leading to the development of tretinoin, which is also known as Altinac, AVITA, Refissa, Retin-A, and Tretin-X. His inventor patents at Dartmouth include the discovery of first generation synthetic triterpenoid CDDO and second generation synthetic triterpenoid CDDO Methyl Ester, also known as bardoxolone methyl. Sporn's research also contributed to the development of omaveloxolone, the first synthetic oleanane triterpenoid approved by Food and Drug Administration.

In 2018, Sporn founded Triterpenoid Therapeutics, Inc. to test his discoveries and bring them to market.

== Research philosophy ==
Sporn has been called the "father of chemoprevention" both because of the applications of a number of his discoveries in preventing cancer, and because of his advocacy for preventative treatment for cancer.

Throughout his career, Sporn challenged the understanding of cancer as a static condition, arguing instead that it should be viewed as a chronic disease and a process. He advocated for giving more attention to prophylaxis and treatment of early-stage cancer as opposed to curing late-stage cancer.

== Awards ==
- 1982 Lila Gruber Award for Cancer Research, American Academy of Dermatology
- 1991 AACR-Bruce F. Cain Memorial Award
- 1994 Mider Lecture Award, National Institutes of Health
- 1994 Medal of Honor, American Cancer Society
- 1995-2005 Editor-in-Chief, Cytokine and Growth Factor Reviews
- 1996 ASCO - American Cancer Society Award and Lecture
- 1998 Elected Fellow, American Association for the Advancement of Science
- 1998 Bristol-Myers Squibb Award for Distinguished Achievement in Cancer Research
- 2002 AACR - Cancer Research Foundation of America Award for Excellence in Cancer Prevention Research
- 2004 National Cancer Institute Eminent Scholar
- 2005 Brinker Award, Susan G. Komen Breast Cancer Foundation
- 2013 Elected Fellow of the AACR Academy
- 2020 Dartmouth Technology Innovation and Commercialization Award

== Publications ==
- 1990. Peptide Growth Factors and their Receptors I, with Anita B. Roberts, Berlin, Heidelberg: Springer. 1st Edition. ISBN 9780387976945
- 1990. Peptide Growth Factors and their Receptors II, with Anita B. Roberts, Berlin, Heidelberg: Springer. 1st Edition. ISBN 9783642747816
- 1984. The Retinoids, Volume I, with Anita B. Roberts and Dewitt S. Goodman, University of Michigan: Academic Press. ISBN 9780126581010
- 1994. The Retinoids, Volume II, with Anita B. Roberts and Dewitt S. Goodman, University of Michigan: Academic Press. ISBN 9780781700825
