= FASEB Excellence in Science Award =

Excellence in Science Award
- Description: Annual award recognizing outstanding achievement and research excellence by women in the biological sciences
- Sponsored by: Eli Lilly and Company
- Country: United States
- Presented by: FASEB

The Excellence in Science Award was established by the Federation of American Societies for Experimental Biology (FASEB) in 1989 to recognize outstanding achievement by women in biological science. All women who are members of one or more of the societies of FASEB are eligible for nomination. Nominations recognize a woman whose career achievements have contributed significantly to further our understanding of a particular discipline by excellence in research.

The award includes a $10,000 unrestricted research grant, funded by Eli Lilly and Company.

== Award recipients ==
Source: FASEB

- 1989 Marian Koshland
- 1990 Elizabeth Hay
- 1991 Ellen Vitetta
- 1992 Bettie Sue Masters
- 1993 Susan Leeman
- 1994 Lucille Shapiro
- 1995 Philippa Marrack
- 1996 Zena Werb
- 1997 Claude Klee
- 1998 Eva Neer
- 1999 Helen Blau
- 2000 Peng Loh
- 2001 Laurie Glimcher
- 2002 Phyllis Wise
- 2003 Joan A. Steitz
- 2004 Janet Rossant
- 2005 Anita Roberts
- 2006 Marilyn Farquhar and Elaine Fuchs
- 2007 Frances Arnold
- 2008 Mina J. Bissell
- 2009 Susan L. Lindquist
- 2010 Susan S. Taylor
- 2011 Gail R. Martin
- 2012 Susan R. Wessler
- 2013 Terry Orr-Weaver
- 2014 Kathryn V. Anderson
- 2015 Diane Griffin
- 2016 Bonnie Bassler
- 2017 Diane Mathis
- 2018 Lynne E. Maquat
- 2019 Barbara B. Kahn
- 2020 :

Lifetime Achievement : Brigid Hogan
Mid-Career Investigator : Aviv Regev
Early-Career Investigator : Karen Schindler

- 2021:

Lifetime Achievement : M. Celeste Simon
Mid-Career Investigator : Valentina Greco
Early-Career Investigator : Cigall Kadoch

- 2022:

Lifetime Achievement : Arlene H. Sharpe
Mid-Career Investigator : Sallie R. Permar
Early-Career Investigator : Smita Krishnaswamy

- 2023:

Lifetime Achievement : Elaine S. Jaffe
Mid-Career Investigator : Paola Arlotta
Early-Career Investigator : Diana Libuda

== See also ==
- List of biology awards
