= Janssen Medal =

The Janssen Medal can refer to:

- The Prix Jules Janssen, awarded by the Société astronomique de France (French Astronomical Society)
- The Janssen Medal (French Academy of Sciences), awarded by the French Academy of Sciences
- The Janssen Medal of the French Photographic Society
- Various awards named after Paul Janssen, such as the Dr. Paul Janssen Award for Biomedical Research
