= Fionula Brennan =

Irish immunologist (1957–2012)

- Born: 1957; Manorhamilton, Ireland
- Died: 15 June 2012 (aged 54–55)
- Education: University of Bristol
- Known for: Discovering "TNF-dependent cytokine cascade", the anti-TNF mechanism affecting rheumatoid arthritis
- Scientific career
- Fields: Immunology
- Workplaces: Kennedy Institute of Rheumatology, Imperial College London and University of Oxford; University of Zimbabwe

Fionula Brennan (1957–2012) was an Irish immunologist and Professor of Cytokine Immunopathology at the Kennedy Institute of Rheumatology.

Brennan described the role of tumour necrosis factor (TNF) in rheumatoid arthritis by demonstrating that anti-TNF antibodies inhibit inflammation of the synovial joints. This research led directly to the development of anti-TNF therapy.

== Early life and education ==
Fionula Brennan was born in Manorhamilton, County Leitrim, to Josie and Ted Brennan in 1957. She had a brother and a sister.

Brennan received her undergraduate degree and PhD in immunology from the University of Bristol.

== Career ==
From the late 1980s, Brennan worked at the Kennedy Institute of Rheumatology, where her work enabled revolutions in the treatment of rheumatoid arthritis. Brennan was Professor of Cytokine Immunopathology at the Kennedy Institute of Rheumatology until 2011.

In the late 1980s, developments in knowledge about cytokine production and methods of study had made it possible to investigate further their role in rheumatoid arthritis. Since it remained unclear which cytokine should be targeted to produce therapeutic effects, they were not investigated as therapeutic targets. However, as a postdoctoral researcher working initially with Ravinder Maini and then under Marc Feldmann from 1988 to 1989, Brennan questioned whether it was possible to suppress pathologic TNF selectively. Her work developed upon that of Feldmann and Glenn Buchan.

Brennan's experiments analysed cytokine expression in a dissociated synovial cell culture model, which kept immune/inflammatory cells alive and made it possible to study disregulation.

Brennan's experiments provided the first evidence that TNF might be a therapeutic target. Brennan's work showed that rheumatoid mixed synovial cell cultures were distinct from osteoarthritic cell cultures because anti-TNF antibodies reduced production of IL-1 cytokines, which regulate immune and inflammatory responses. Later experiments showed that it also downregulated other proinflammatory cytokines (GM-CSF, IL-6, and IL-8). This unexpected "TNF-dependent cytokine cascade" suggested that TNF might be a therapeutic target for rheumatoid arthritis.

Brennan spent the rest of her career building upon her significant early findings the importance of TNF overproduction in rheumatoid arthritis. She challenged the idea that T-cells were not relevant to rheumatoid arthritis by showing that TNF was produced by T-cell activated macrophages.

Brennan's final project sought to understand why regulatory T-cells failed to affect disease process. She found that pathogenic T-cells in joints and cytokine activated T-cells were not controlled by regulatory T-cells.

=== Research community ===
Brennan and Frances Balkwill ran the British Cytokine Group (BCG) for around 10 years. This group developed out of the 1987 TNF meeting and brought together researchers that worked in different fields such as cancer research and infections and inflammatory disease.

== Death and legacy ==
Brennan died on 15 June 2012 at Parkside Hospital, Wimbledon, as a result of cancer. She was survived by her husband Paul Gallagher and children Ciarán and Bridget.

The Marc and Tania Feldmann Charitable Trust plan to commemorate Brennan by naming a grant in her honour.
