= Terry Orr-Weaver =

American molecular biologist

- Education: Harvard University
- Known for: identification of genes for chromosome separation
- Awards: 2006 Fellow of the American Academy of Microbiology; 2006 National Academy of Sciences; 2010 Fellow of American Association for Advancement of Science; 2013 FASEB Excellence in Science Award; 2018 Flexner Discovery Lecturer at Vanderbilt University
- Scientific career
- Fields: genetics, developmental biology, cell biology
- Workplaces: Massachusetts Institute of Technology, Whitehead Institute
- Thesis: (1984)
- Doctoral advisor: Jack Szostak

Terry L. Orr-Weaver is an American molecular biologist in the MIT Department of Biology with a joint appointment to the Whitehead Institute. She does research on developmental biology, with a focus on "[c]oordination of cell growth and division with development, with particular focus on the oocyte-to-embryo transition, control of cell size, and regulation of metazoan DNA replication." Orr-Weaver and her collaborators have identified two proteins necessary for the proper sorting of chromosomes during meiosis with implications for cancer and birth defects. In 2006 she was elected to the National Academy of Sciences.

== Education ==
Terry Orr-Weaver received her PhD in biological chemistry in 1984 from Harvard University. She was the first graduate student advised by Nobel laureate Jack Szostak in his career, and he discussed her research in his Nobel biography.

== Academic and research career ==
Orr-Weaver was a faculty member at Massachusetts Institute of Technology and also at the Whitehead Institute, both of which she joined in 1987. She became a Searle Scholar in 1988. She was appointed an American Cancer Society Research Professor at MIT in 2008. She served as the President of the Genetics Society of America in 2005, and President of the National Drosophila Board in 2008. In 2013 she received the FASEB Excellence in Science Award.

Orr-Weaver's research concerns the cell cycle and delves into both normal and abnormal aspects of cell division regulation in such diseases as cancer and certain birth defects. She and her collaborators have particularly elucidated the way the cell cycle is coordinated with development. They have shown that cortex protein specifically triggers the anaphase-promoting complex in ovaries and the degradation of cortex protein following egg-activation is strictly controlled. They have also established that Inducer of Meiosis 4 (IME4) is required for an important step, Notch signaling, to occur in fruit fly ovaries.

She is the co-author, with Harvey Lodish, of the book Model Organisms: Drosophila, published in 1997 by Academic Press.

In 1994, Orr-Weaver was one of 16 women faculty in the School of Science at MIT who drafted and co-signed a letter to the then-Dean of Science (now Chancellor of Berkeley) Robert Birgeneau, which started a campaign to highlight and challenge gender discrimination at MIT.

== Awards and honors ==
- 2005–06 President of the Genetics Society of America
- 2006 Fellow of the American Academy of Microbiology
- 2006 National Academy of Sciences
- 2010 Fellow of American Association for Advancement of Science
- 2013 FASEB Excellence in Science Award
- 2018 Flexner Discovery Lecturer at Vanderbilt University
