= Helen Blau =

American biochemist

Helen Blau FRS
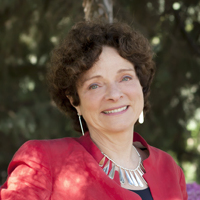
- Blau in 2013
- Born: Helen Margaret Blau; London, England
- Other name: Helen M Blau
- Education: University of York; Harvard University
- Spouse: David Spiegel
- Children: 2
- Family: Eve Blau (sister)
- Scientific career
- Fields: Developmental biology, Regenerative medicine, Stem cell biology
- Workplaces: Stanford University Medical School
- Website: Blau Lab website

Helen Margaret Blau is a cell biologist and stem cell researcher known for her work on muscle diseases, regeneration and aging. She is the Donald E. and Delia B. Baxter Foundation Professor and the Director of the Baxter Laboratory for Stem Cell Biology at Stanford University. Blau is known for overturning the prevailing view that once a cell assumes a certain specialty in the body — or differentiated state —such as a skin or liver cell, it cannot be changed. Her research established that the fate of mammalian cells can be altered. Her finding that specialized cells can be triggered to turn on genetic programs characteristic of other differentiated states provided early evidence that mammalian cellular reprogramming was possible and opened the door to the use of reprogramming in stem cell biology. Her work set the stage for the development of induced pluripotent stem cells and associated stem cell therapies.

Blau is also known for her work on adult stem cells and how they maintain, repair and rejuvenate tissues, in particular muscle. She revealed the role of the microenvironment of the niche, most notably tissue stiffness, in regulating stem cell function and showed how stem cell function declines in aging and hereditary muscle wasting diseases.

She discovered ways to rejuvenate aged stem cell and muscle tissue function. Blau discovered a new class of aging-associated enzyme she termed a "gerozyme" and showed that pharmacological targeting of the gerozyme in aged muscle tissue can rejuvenate tissue structure and metabolism and increase strength. Recently she extended this work to cartilage and showed that inhibition of the gerozyme regenerates cartilage in joints with OA due either to an ACL injury or aging. These findings suggest that 15-PGDH inhibition could be a therapeutic strategy for sarcopenia and for OA.

== Education and early life ==
Blau earned a B.A. from the University of York in England and an M.A. and Ph.D. in biology from Harvard University and was postdoctoral fellow at University of California, San Francisco.

== Career and research ==
After a postdoctoral fellowship with Charles J. Epstein in the departments of Biochemistry and Biophysics and the Division of Medical Genetics at The University of California, San Francisco (UCSF), she joined the faculty at Stanford University in 1978. She was awarded an endowed chair in 1999 and named Director of the Baxter Laboratory for Stem Cell Biology in 2002.

=== Cellular reprogramming and plasticity ===
It was long thought that the differentiated state is fixed and irreversible. In the 1980s, Blau challenged that idea using a cell fusion system she devised to join cells of two different species and differentiated states. Her experiments showed that previously silent genes could be activated. Specifically, when human skin, connective tissue, or liver cells were fused with mouse muscle cells, the human cells began to make muscle-specific gene products. This body of work showed that the differentiated state requires continuous reinforcement, and that a shift in the balance of regulator proteins called transcription factors in the nucleus can reprogram the cell to become a different type of cell. This discovery of an unexpected plasticity, or flexibility, in cell fate was foundational for the development of the field of stem cell biology and regenerative medicine. It was featured as "Plasticity of the Differentiated State" on the cover of the Frontiers in Biology special issue of the journal Science in 1985.

=== Muscle stem cell biology ===
Adult stem cells are found in tissues throughout the body. When they divide during development, or to repair damage after injury, one daughter cell remains a stem cell (it self-renews), while the other differentiates (it specializes) to become one of the cell types that make up that tissue.

In 2008, Blau published the first parameters for isolating muscle stem cells, also known as satellite cells, using flow cytometry. Her lab pioneered the use of bioluminescence imaging to monitor the dynamics of muscle stem cell engraftment in muscles in live mice and confirmed that the cells were true stem cells, capable of both self-renewal and differentiation. They also designed a bioengineered hydrogel with a stiffness that mimics healthy young muscle. Unlike rigid plastic tissue culture dishes, the elastic hydrogel preserves the stemness of the cells when grown in culture. This discovery provided the first functional link between substrate elasticity and the maintenance of stem cell self-renewal properties and established a paradigm with broad utility to enhance the regenerative capacity of tissue-specific stem cells grown in the laboratory.

=== Muscle regeneration after injury ===
In 2014 Blau's lab provided early evidence that stem cell function declines during aging due to internal defects, in addition to external factors. They identified a small molecule, SB202, that inhibits an enzyme associated with aging called p38-MAP kinase and showed that the regenerative properties of aged muscle stem cells could be rejuvenated through a combination of biophysical (growth on the bioengineered hydrogels Blau's lab designed) and biochemical (blocking p38MAPK) signals. More recently, Blau showed that muscle stem cells exhibit an age-dependent increase in CD47 levels, and that this increase is a hallmark of age-related muscle stem cell dysfunction. CD47 is a protein found on the surface of many cells in the body that protects them from attack by the body's immune system; an increase in the number of CD47 molecules on old or diseased cells can prevent the body from disposing of them properly. Overcoming this increase in CD47 levels led to a robust increase in muscle strength after injury. These approaches provide a paradigm for cell therapy strategies to treat muscle wasting.

In 2017 Blau's lab identified prostaglandin E2 (PGE2) as a critical component of the inflammatory response that orchestrates the natural muscle repair process. They showed that blocking the ability of muscle stem cells to respond to PGE2, or treatment with non-steroidal anti-inflammatory drugs like ibuprofen that inhibit PGE2 synthesis, leads to loss of muscle strength after injury. Injection of PGE2 into injured muscles causes resident muscle stem cells to increase in number and enhances muscle repair. These experiments showed that PGE2 is required and sufficient for muscle stem cell function in recovery after injury.

=== Gerozymes ===
In 2021 Blau discovered that with aging muscles accumulate increasing amounts of the enzyme 15-PGDH, the prostaglandin degrading enzyme which breaks down PGE2. This enzyme appears to be a master regulator of muscle aging. If 15-PGDH is overexpressed in muscles of young mice, they exhibit muscle atrophy and weakness that mimic the effect of years of aging. Conversely, using a small molecule drug to reduce the activity of 15-PGDH in old mice markedly increases muscle mass, strength and endurance when running on a treadmill. These experiments showed that 15-PDGH is a pivotal molecular determinant of aging in muscle — a new class of molecule Blau termed a "gerozyme".

When skeletal muscles lose synapses, points of contact with the nerves, they atrophy and weaken, which compromises mobility and affects quality of life. Denervation can be sudden due to a traumatic injury that compresses or severs the nerves or can occur progressively over time with disease or age. A total of 3 to 5% of the population in the United States suffers from such disorders, and the available treatment options are limited. Blau's laboratory showed that inhibiting the gerozyme restores neuromuscular connections after either an acute or chronic loss of synapses due injury or aging.

Further experiments showed that blocking the activity of the gerozyme has a synergistic beneficial effect on muscle: enhancing the number and function of cellular energy factories called mitochondria, remodeling the arrangement of protein filaments called myofibrils that make up muscle fibers, and repressing harmful aging-associated pathways. Coupled with its effect on muscle stem cells and motor axons, 15-PGDH represents a potent target for treatments designed to enhance muscle strength in those who are frail due to muscle disuse, genetic disease, or age. Blau is actively involved in efforts to translate these findings to the clinic.

=== Innovation ===
Blau is an ardent inventor who holds 16 issued US patents and numerous international patents which focus on assays of protein interactions, methods for telomere extension and tissue regeneration. She earned an Outstanding Inventor Award from the Stanford University Office of Technology Licensing and is recognized as one of Stanford's top innovators. She was elected to the National Academy of Inventors in 2017. Blau consults for biotechnology and pharmaceutical companies and is the founder of two companies focused on regenerative medicine to increase healthspan.

=== Teaching and Mentoring ===
Blau is known for her support of women in science and her success in mentoring numerous young scientists who comprise the next generation of academic leaders in muscle biology, stem cell biology and regenerative medicine. She has trained more than 95 students and postdoctoral scholars and she mentors young scientists at all levels.

=== Other Activities ===
Blau has served on many prominent scientific advisory boards and councils, including the Harvard Board of Overseers, the National Academy of Sciences, the National Academy of Medicine, NIH National Institute on Aging, the American Academy of Arts and Sciences, the American Society for Cell Biology, American Society for Gene Therapy, Ellison Medical Foundation, and the International Society for Stem Cell Research. She has served as the president of the American Society for Developmental Biology and president of the International Society of Differentiation. She has organized numerous national and international conferences and is an elected member of the Pontifical Academy of Sciences that advises Pope Leo XIV at the Vatican.

Blau is an active proponent of the ethical use of stem cells, fetal tissues and animals in research and she has contributed to multiple articles in the New England Journal of Medicine discussing animal research policies and the use of human fetal tissue in medicine. Recently, she helped implement the International Society for Stem Cell Research's 2023 "Guidelines for Stem Cell Research and Clinical Translation".

=== Honors & Awards ===
Honors – elected member

- American Association for the Advancement of Science (1991),
- National Academy of Medicine (1995)
- American Academy of Arts and Sciences (1996)
- National Academy of Sciences (2016)
- National Academy of Inventors (2017)
- Pontifical Academy of Sciences (2017)
- American Philosophical Society (2018)
- American Institute for Medical and Biological Engineering (2019)
- Austrian Academy of Sciences (2024)
- Royal Society (2024)
- European Molecular Biology Organization (EMBO) (2024)
- National Medal of Science (2025)
- President, The Society for Developmental Biology (1994)
- President, International Society of Differentiation (2002)

Honorary Doctorates

- Honorary Doctorate University of Nijmegan, Holland (2003)
- Honorary Doctorate University of York, England (2018)

Selected Awards

- Resident Scholar, Bellagio Study Center of Rockefeller Foundation, Italy (1992)
- MERIT Award, National Institutes of Health (1995)
- FASEB Excellence in Science Award (1999)
- Ellison Medical Foundation Senior Scholar Award (2001)
- McKnight Technological Innovations in Neuroscience Award (2001)
- Rolf-Sammet-Fonds Visiting Professorship, University of Frankfurt (2003)
- The American Association for Cancer Research Irving Weinstein Foundation Distinguished Lecture (2011)
- Keynote Speaker, Chromatin, Replication and Chromosomal Stability Conference, Stockholm, Sweden (2011)
- 50th Anniversary Symposium on Jacob and Monod's Operon Model (in honor of Francois Jacob), Institut Pasteur, Paris, France 2011
- NIH Director's Transformative Research Award (2012)
- 60th Anniversary Celebration of the Discovery of DNA (in honor of J.D. Watson), Cold Spring Harbor, NY (2013)
- Yvette Mayent-Rothschild Visiting Professorship, Institut Curie, Paris (2013)
- Stanford Office of Technology Licensing's Outstanding Inventor Award (2015)
- The Glenn Award for Research in Biological Mechanisms of Aging (2015)
- Li Ka Shing Foundation Award (2015)
- Ray A. and Robert L. Kroc Lectureship on Diabetes, Joslin Diabetes Center (2018)
- Milky Way Foundation Award (2021)
- Ernest McCulloch Lectureship, in honor of pioneering stem cell biologist, Presidential Symposium, International Society for Stem Cell Research (2023)
- National Medal of Science (2025)
- Carnegie Corporation of New York Great Immigrant Award (2025)
