= William D.M. Paton =

British pharmacologist

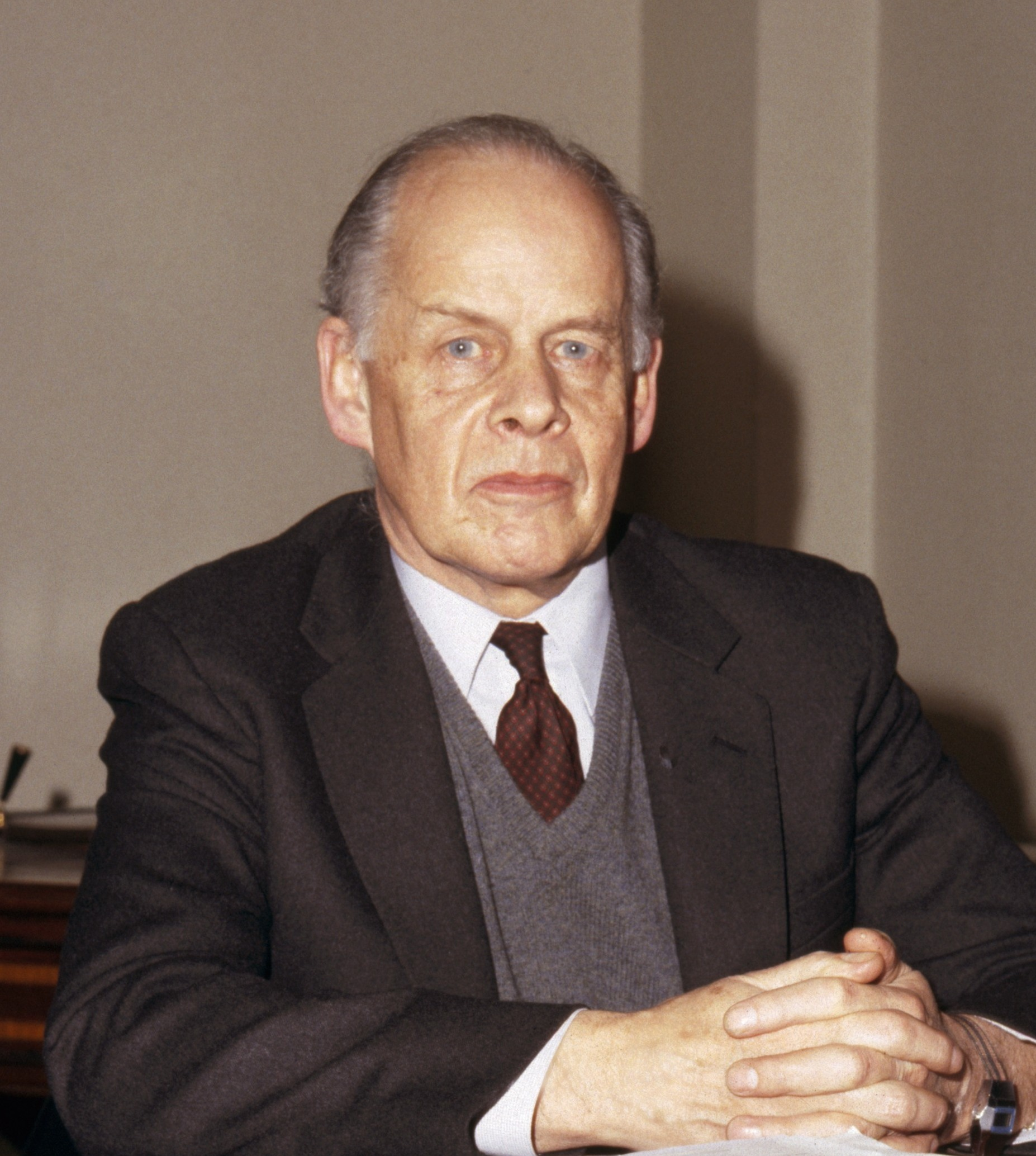
- William D.M. Paton in 1984
- Born: 5 May 1917
- Died: 17 October 1993 (aged 76)
- Occupation: British pharmacologist
- Awards: Cameron Prize for Therapeutics of the University of Edinburgh (1956); Gairdner Foundation International Award (1959)

Sir William Drummond Macdonald Paton CBE FRS (5 May 1917 – 17 October 1993) was a British pharmacologist and vivisection activist.

== Biography ==
Paton was born in Hendon and educated at Repton School and New College, Oxford, where he was awarded a BA in animal physiology. In 1939 he entered University College Hospital (UCH) to study clinical medicine and was appointed house physician to the medical unit.

Unfit for military service he took the post of pathologist in a tuberculosis sanatorium, later moving to the National Institute for Medical Research, then in Hampstead, London. He worked at NIMR for 8 years on the pharmacology of acetylcholine and its benefits in the control of hypertension. For this work he and his colleague Eleanor Zaimis were amongst the recipients of the first Gairdner Foundation International Awards in 1959.

In 1952 he returned to UCH as reader in applied pharmacology, and spent the next two years studying submarine physiology, developing the blend of oxygen, helium and nitrogen (Tri-mix) which enables divers to work at deeper depths. In 1956, he was awarded the Cameron Prize for Therapeutics of the University of Edinburgh.

In 1954 he was appointed Professor of Pharmacology at the Royal College of Surgeons, remaining there until 1959, when he was given the post of Professor of Pharmacology in the Department of Pharmacology, University of Oxford and made a Fellow of Balliol College. He was appointed a CBE in 1968 and knighted in 1979. He retired in 1984.

He died in Oxford, aged 76.

== Fellow of the Royal Society ==
He was elected a Fellow of the Royal Society in 1956. His nomination citation read: " Distinguished for his researches on histamine and methonium compounds. With MacIntosh he showed that many simple organic bases are histamine releasers and, later, he found that this property is shared by opium alkaloids and by a phenylethylamine derivative, compound 48/80, the most active known releaser. One of the outstanding recent contributions to pharmacology and therapeutics is his discovery, with Zaimis, of the actions of the methonium compounds - decamethonium a potent neuromuscular, and hexamethonium a potent ganglion blocking substance. His analysis of their mode of action has since become the model for such studies and led to the distinction between block by depolarisation and competition. Hexamethonium became the first effective drug in the treatment of malignant hypertension and of great value in cranial and plastic surgery. During the war he worked for the Royal Naval Personnel Research Committee on submarine physiology. "

== Views on animals ==
Paton was a vivisection activist and an opponent of animal rights. His 1984 book Man and Mouse: Animals in Medical Research was a defence of the use of animals in medical research. It was revised in 1993. According to Paton, a distinction should be made between moral agents and moral objects. Humans are moral agents who can accept duties and claim rights whilst animals are moral objects who have no duties, cannot make claims and do not have rights.

== Selected publications ==
- Vivisection, Morals, Medicine: Commentary from a Vivisecting Professor of Pharmacology (1983)
- Man and Mouse: Animals in Medical Research (1984, 1993)
