= Marc Feldmann =

Australian-educated British immunologist (born 1944)

Professor Sir Marc Feldmann AC FRS FAA FRCP FRCPath FMedSci
- Born: 2 December 1944 (age 81); Lvov
- Citizenship: Australia - United Kingdom
- Education: University of Melbourne; Walter and Eliza Hall Institute of Medical Research
- Known for: discovery of anti-TNF therapy for rheumatoid arthritis and other autoimmune diseases
- Awards: Crafoord Prize (2000); Cameron Prize for Therapeutics of the University of Edinburgh (2002); Albert Lasker Award for Clinical Medical Research (2003); EPO European Inventor of the Year Award (2007); Dr. Paul Janssen Award for Biomedical Research (2008); Ernst Schering Prize (2010); Gairdner Foundation International Award (2014); Tang Prize (2020); Royal Medal (2024); Robert Koch Gold Medal (2026)
- Scientific career
- Fields: Immunology
- Workplaces: Kennedy Institute of Rheumatology; Imperial College London; University of Oxford
- Doctoral students: Ashok Venkitaraman

Sir Marc Feldmann (born 2 December 1944) is an Australian-educated British immunologist. He is a professor at the University of Oxford and a senior research fellow at Somerville College, Oxford.

== Biography ==
Feldmann was born 2 December 1944 in Lvov to a well-to-do Polish-Jewish family who managed to get to France immediately postwar. He emigrated from France to Australia at age eight. After graduating with an MBBS degree from the University of Melbourne in 1967, he earned a Ph.D. in Immunology at the Walter and Eliza Hall Institute of Medical Research in 1972 with Sir Gustav Nossal.

He moved to London in the 1970s, working first with Avrion Mitchison at the Imperial Cancer Research Fund's Tumour Immunology Unit; in 1985 he moved to the Charing Cross Sunley Research Centre and the Kennedy Institute of Rheumatology (which joined with the Faculty of Medicine at Imperial College in 2000; in August 2011 the Institute transferred to the University of Oxford.

== Research ==
In the 1980s he published an hypothesis for the mechanism of induction of autoimmune diseases, highlighting the role of cytokines. This model was validated in experiments with thyroid disease tissue. From 1984 he collaborated with Ravinder N. Maini at the Kennedy Institute of Rheumatology to study disease mechanism in rheumatoid arthritis, an autoimmune disease affecting 1% of the population.

Feldmann's group demonstrated that diseased joints have far more pro-inflammatory cytokines than normal, and postdoctoral researcher Fionula Brennan identified one of these, tumour necrosis factor alpha, (abbreviated TNFα) as the key.

Blocking TNFα reduced levels of the other pro-inflammatory cytokines in test-tube models of arthritis, and this provided the rationale for testing TNF blockade in rheumatoid arthritis patients which had failed all existing treatment.

The first of a series of successful clinical trials was performed in 1992 at Charing Cross Hospital, using the antibody infliximab from Centocor, a biotech now part of Johnson and Johnson.

The success led to other companies joining the race to market. By 1998, etanercept (Enbrel) was approved for treatment in the US, and by 1999, infliximab (Remicade) was also approved; there have been multiple additional approved anti-TNF drugs, and they have become standard therapy for stopping the inflammatory and tissue-destructive pathways of rheumatoid arthritis and other autoimmune diseases including Crohn's disease, ulcerative colitis, ankylosing spondylitis, psoriasis and psoriatic arthritis.

== Prizes and fellowships ==
In 2000, Feldmann and Maini were awarded the Crafoord Prize; in 2002, the Cameron Prize for Therapeutics of the University of Edinburgh; in 2003, the Albert Lasker Award for Clinical Medical Research; in 2008, the Dr. Paul Janssen Award for Biomedical Research; in 2010, the Ernst Schering Prize in Germany; in 2014, the Canada Gairdner International Award. Feldmann was also awarded the John Curtin Medal of the Australian National University in 2007. In 2020 he received the Tang Prize in Biopharmaceutical Science, and in 2024 the Royal Medal of the Royal Society jointly with Ravinder N. Maini. In 2026 he was awarded the Robert Koch Gold Medal.

Feldmann is Fellow of the Royal College of Physicians and of the Royal College of Pathologists. He was elected a Fellow of several national Academies, the Academy of Medical Sciences, the Royal Society of London and is a Corresponding Member of Australian Academy of Science, and a Foreign Member of the National Academy of Sciences, US. He was knighted in the 2010 Queen's Birthday Honours.

In 2012 he delivered the Croonian Lecture to the Royal College of Physicians on anti-cytokine therapy.
