= Susan Leeman =

American endocrinologist (1930–2026)

- Born: May 9, 1930; Chicago, Illinois, U.S.
- Died: January 20, 2026 (aged 95); New York City, U.S.
- Education: Goucher College, Radcliffe College
- Known for: Discovery of Substance P and neurotensin
- Scientific career
- Fields: Endocrinology
- Thesis: The Problem of Neurohormonal Stimulation of the Secretion of Adrenocorticotropic Hormone (1958)

Susan E. Leeman (May 9, 1930 – January 20, 2026) was an American endocrinologist who was renowned for her research on peptides. Leeman was a professor in the Department of Pharmacology and Experimental Therapeutics at Boston University. She continued to work into her nineties and later served as the director of the Neuropeptide Laboratory in the Pharmacology Department at the Chobanian and Avedisian School of Medicine. Her work with substance P and neurotensin, both of which are peptides crucial to the function of the nervous, endocrine, and immune systems, led to her becoming considered one of the pioneers of neuroendocrinology. Her later research focused on substance P specifically and how it binds with its receptor. Leeman was elected as a member within the National Academy of Sciences in 1991 and received the academy's Fred Conrad Koch Award in 1994. Leeman was a member of the Endocrine Society, Society for Neuroscience, American Association for the Advancement of Science, and American Physiological Society.

== Early life and education ==
Susan Epstein (later changed to Leeman by marriage) was born on May 9, 1930, in Chicago, Illinois. Her mother was born in the United States and her father had emigrated from Russia to New York City. Her father was an academic metallurgist and her mother attended college at George Washington University at a time when few other women did. Susan also had one older brother named Henry. When Susan was six weeks old she and her family moved to Columbus, Ohio, and then to Bethlehem, Pennsylvania when she was six years old. There she grew up a part of a middle class Jewish family. She often faced discrimination in the form of antisemitism and sexism as she pursued a career in science.

During her childhood Leeman attended Hebrew School and was a Girl Scout. She decided to attend Goucher College, which was an all-girls’ school at the time, from which she received a bachelor's degree in physiology in 1951. She then applied to and was accepted by Harvard Medical School, but her academic program was administered through Radcliffe College. Thus, Radcliffe College was where she received her master's degree and PhD from in 1954 and 1958 respectively. Leeman was the only woman in her class to make it through the graduate program and continue a career in science. During her time in graduate school she was introduced to the field of neuroendocrinology, within which she was able to explore her passion for how the mind connects to the body. While in graduate school in the 1960s she began working on corticotropin, and while trying to purify this hormone later in her career she made a chance finding of a peptide called substance P. This event subsequently led to her life's work of researching substance P and another peptide she chemically isolated and defined, neurotensin.

== Professional career ==
Following her graduation in 1958, Susan Leeman was offered a one-year position as an instructor in the Physiology Department at Harvard Medical School. Realizing she was only a fill-in, the following year she took a job at Brandeis University where she stayed for the next 12 years. During this time she received a Career Development Award which helped her to balance her career and family life.

Leeman's research while at Brandeis University mainly focused on the effect a corticotropin-releasing factor (CRF) had on the secretion of adrenocorticotrophic hormone (ACTH) from the anterior pituitary gland. During her effort to purify the CRF, she discovered a peptide that could stimulate the secretion of saliva. This caused her to switch the direction of the project entirely, as she decided to further investigate this peptide. Eventually Leeman and her lab realized she had unintentionally isolated substance P – a peptide originally discovered by Ulf von Euler in the 1930s, but had yet to be chemically defined. Leeman went on to discover the amino acid sequence of substance P and published her findings in the Journal of Biological Chemistry in 1970. During the purification process of substance P, Leeman and a graduate student of hers discovered a different peptide that was distributed throughout the central nervous system, gastrointestinal tract, and immune system, but had yet to be identified. They decided to name their discovery “neurotensin”.

In 1972, having not yet received a full position, Leeman returned to Harvard Medical School as an assistant professor and continued her studies of substance P and neurotensin in the Laboratory of Human Reproduction and Reproductive Biology until 1980. She then left the medical school when she realised that she would not be offered a tenure there either, gaining a tenured professorship in physiology at the University of Massachusetts Medical School. In 1992, Leeman left Massachusetts to help start the pharmacology department at Boston University, where she has remained a professor in the Department of Pharmacology & Experimental Therapeutics, and the director of the Neuropeptide Laboratory in the Pharmacology Department at the Chobanian and Avedisian School of Medicine. As a result of her work Leeman is widely regarded as one of the founders of the field of neuroendocrinology.

== Later research ==
Later research projects conducted by Leeman and her lab were centered around the two peptides, substance P and neurotensin, that she originally isolated, sequenced, and synthesized. Her lab at Boston University has multiple goals regarding these neural peptides, including mapping their distribution within the brain and peripheral nervous system, delineating tracts containing substance P or neurotensin within the central nervous system, determining how substance P and neurotensin are released from neural tissue in vitro and in vivo, and identifying the binding domain of substance P with its receptor.

== Death ==
Leeman died on January 20, 2026, at the age of 95.

== Awards ==
Leeman became the first woman elected to the National Academy of Sciences in physiology and pharmacology in 1991. She was elected to the American Academy of Arts and Sciences in 1987. In 1993 she won the FASEB Excellence in Science Award and in 2005 won the Committee on Women in Neuroscience's Mika Salpeter Lifetime Achievement Award.

== Personal life ==
In 1957, Leeman married a medical student at Harvard while she was completing her doctorate there. Her three children survive her. She retired at nearly 90.
