= Claude Klee =

French biochemist

- Born: July 1931; France
- Died: 4 April 2017 (aged 85); Maryland, US
- Known for: Biomedical cancer research

Claude Klee (1931 – 4 April 2017) was a French biochemist.

== Biography ==
Claude B. Klee attended the University of Marseille until she graduated with her medical degree in 1959. She moved to the United States to work at the National Institute of Mental Health and also spent some time in Basel. In 1961 Klee began to work at the National Institutes of Health with Herbert Tabor, Louis Sokoloff and Maxine Singer. By 1966 Klee had a laboratory at the National Institute of Arthritis and Metabolic Diseases. In 1974 she started what was to become her iconic work at the National Cancer Institute's Biochemistry Laboratory which led to the 1991 Presidential Rank Awards. Klee was elected to the National Academy of Medicine in 1992. She also won the FASEB Excellence in Science Award. From 1995 Klee was a member of the American Academy of Arts and Sciences. Klee was also awarded the Women in Science and Engineering (WISE) Lifetime Achievement Award. She died in 2017 in Maryland, US.

Klee met her husband, Werner Klee, while working at Basel. The couple had two children.
