= Ravinder Maini =

British rheumatologist

Professor Sir Ravinder Maini FRS FRCP FRCPE FMedSci
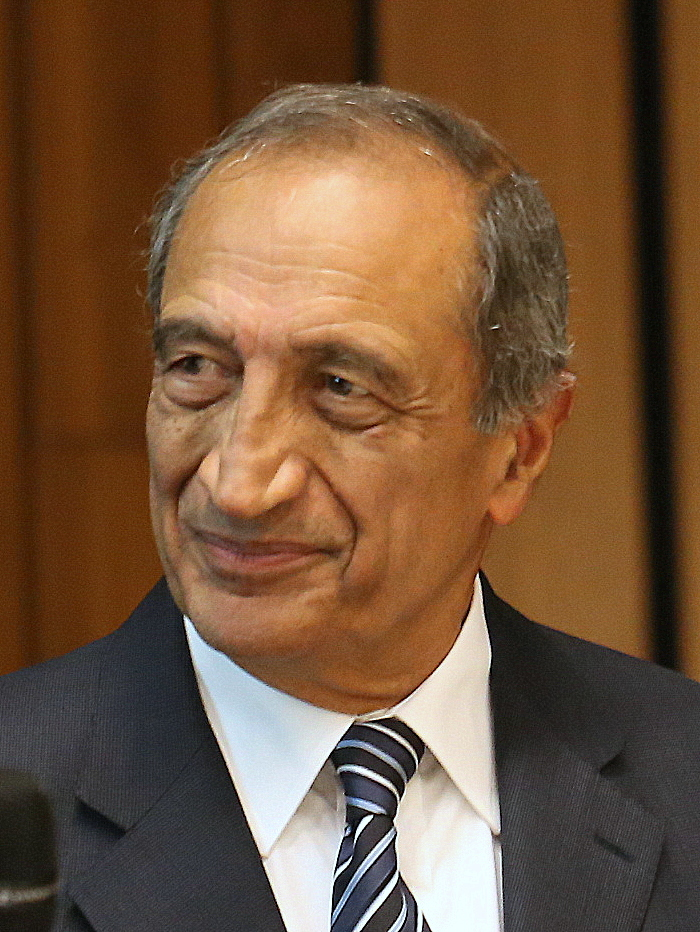
- Maini in Budapest, 2013.
- Born: 17 November 1937 (age 88); Ludhiana, Punjab, British India
- Education: Sidney Sussex College, Cambridge
- Known for: discovery of anti-TNF therapy as an effective treatment for rheumatoid arthritis
- Awards: Crafoord Prize (2000); Cameron Prize for Therapeutics of the University of Edinburgh (2002); Albert Lasker Award for Clinical Medical Research (2003); Dr. Paul Janssen Award for Biomedical Research (2008); Gairdner Foundation International Award (2014); Royal Medal (2024)
- Scientific career
- Fields: Immunology
- Workplaces: Imperial College School of Medicine

Sir Ravinder Nath Maini (born 17 November 1937) is an Indian-born British rheumatologist and academic who is an emeritus professor at Imperial College London. He led the Kennedy Institute of Rheumatology.

== Biography ==
Maini was born in Ludhiana, Punjab, British India, to Sir Amar Maini, a Kenyan-born lawyer and Ugandan politician, and his wife, Sam Saheli Mehra. His younger brother is academic Yoginder Nath Tidu Maini. Ravinder completed his bachelor's degree at Sidney Sussex College, Cambridge. In the 1980s, Maini, Marc Feldmann and Fionula Brennan identified TNF alpha as a key cytokine in the process of rheumatoid arthritis.

== Honours and awards ==
- 2000: Maini was awarded the Crafoord Prize jointly with Marc Feldmann.
- 2003: Knighthood
- 2003: Albert Lasker Award for Clinical Medical Research.
- 2004: Fothergillian prize from the London Medical Society
- 2004: Cameron Prize for Therapeutics of the University of Edinburgh
- 2007: Elected Fellow of the Royal Society
- 2008: Dr. Paul Janssen Award for Biomedical Research together with Marc Feldmann.
- 2010: Ernst Schering Prize from the German Schering Foundation together with Marc Feldmann.
- 2024: Royal Medal of the Royal Society jointly with Marc Feldmann.

He is an honorary member of the British Society for Immunology.
