= Patrick Humphrey =

British Pharmacologist

Professor Patrick Humphrey OBE
- Education: University of London
- Known for: Discovery of the triptans
- Awards: Cameron Prize for Therapeutics of the University of Edinburgh (1996)
- Scientific career
- Doctoral advisor: Richard Creese

Professor Patrick Humphrey OBE DSc PhD HonFBPhS is a South African-born British pharmacologist. He was instrumental in the discovery of the triptans, a group of 5-HT_{1B} and 5-HT_{1D} agonists used to stop single instances of cluster headache or migraine.

== Career ==
Patrick Humphrey studied at the University of London for his undergraduate, master's and doctoral degrees. His doctoral thesis concerned the activities of decamethonium at the neuromuscular junction, and was supervised by Richard Creese. After his PhD, Patrick joined Allen & Hanburys, a subsidiary of GlaxoSmithKline. His research into the cerebrovascular system uncovered some mechanisms by which serotonergic drugs affected blood flow within the skull. This led to the discovery of the triptans, a group of 5-HT_{1B/1D} agonists, most notably sumatriptan. He then became the director of the Glaxo Division of Pharmacology, which would go on to develop the anti-emetic drug odansetron. At this time he was also made an honorary Professor of Applied Pharmacology by the University of Cambridge. From 2001–2008, he acted as Head of Research at Theravance.

== Awards ==
In 1996, Patrick was awarded the Cameron Prize for Therapeutics of the University of Edinburgh. The next year, 1997, he was awarded the Royal Society's Mullard Award. He was awarded the OBE for "services to migraine research".
