= Lynne E. Maquat =

American biochemist

Lynne Maquat
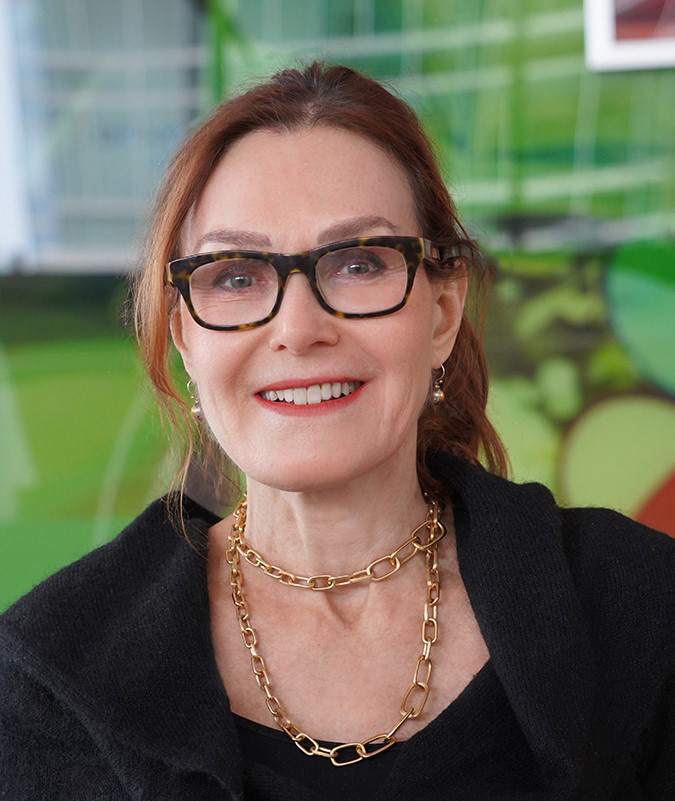
- Born: Lynne Elizabeth Maquat
- Education: University of Wisconsin–Madison; University of Connecticut
- Known for: RNA biology in human diseases
- Awards: Albany Medical Center Prize in Medicine and Biomedical Research (2024); Dr. Paul Janssen Award for Biomedical Research (2024); Gruber Prize in Genetics (2023); Wolf Prize in Medicine (2021); FASEB Excellence in Science Award (2018); Wiley Prize (2018); Gairdner Foundation International Award (2015); William C. Rose Award (2014); Member of the National Academy of Sciences (2011)
- Scientific career
- Fields: Biochemistry; Molecular biology Cell biology
- Workplaces: University of Rochester
- Doctoral advisor: William S. Reznikoff
- Website: www.urmc.rochester.edu/labs/maquat-lab

Lynne Elizabeth Maquat is an American biochemist and molecular biologist whose research focuses on the cellular mechanisms of human disease. She is known for her work in describing the process of nonsense-mediated decay. She is an elected member of the American Academy of Arts and Sciences, the National Academy of Sciences and the National Academy of Medicine. She currently holds the J. Lowell Orbison Endowed Chair and is a professor of biochemistry and biophysics, pediatrics and oncology at the University of Rochester Medical Center.

== Education ==
Maquat graduated magna cum laude with a Bachelor of Science degree in biology from the University of Connecticut in 1974. She received her PhD in biochemistry from the University of Wisconsin-Madison in 1979.

== Career and research ==
Maquat did postdoctoral research at the McArdle Laboratory for Cancer Research in Madison, Wisconsin. She then had a brief stint at Roswell Park Comprehensive Cancer Center in Buffalo, New York before settling at the University of Rochester in Rochester, New York, where she now holds an endowed chair. Her research is focused on mRNA decay and the molecular basis of human disease. Her research Specifically, she was the first to describe nonsense-mediated mRNA decay, work that enabled the discovery of the exon junction complex as a critical quality-control mechanism in the cell. She also described Staufen-mediated mRNA decay, a competitive process to NMD, and microRNA degradation. Her research began with beta thalassemia as a model and expanded to other hemoglobinopathies. She has also studied cell death in breast cancer cells exposed to chemotherapy, and cellular differentiation in muscle cells. Maquat also founded the Graduate Women in Science program at the University of Rochester Medical School, which provides mentoring and support to women seeking graduate education in the sciences.

=== Elected fellowships/memberships ===
- 2006 American Association for the Advancement of Science
- 2006 American Academy of Arts and Sciences
- 2011 National Academy of Sciences
- 2018 National Academy of Medicine

=== Awards and honors ===
- 2010 Lifetime Achievement Award in Service from the International RNA Society
- 2012–2013 Batsheva de Rothschild Fellow of the Israel Academy of Sciences and Humanities
- 2014 Athena Award for community involvement
- 2014 William C. Rose Award
- 2015 Canada Gairdner International Award
- 2017 Vanderbilt Prize in Biomedical Science
- 2017 Lifetime Achievement Award in Science from the International RNA Society
- 2018 FASEB Excellence in Science Award.
- 2018 Wiley Prize in Biomedical Sciences, Rockefeller University, New York, NY
- 2019 IUBMB Jubilee Lectureship
- 2021 Wolf Prize in Medicine, Wolf Foundation, Israel
- 2021 Warren Alpert Foundation Prize Harvard Medical School, Boston, Massachusetts
- 2023 Gruber Prize in Genetics
- 2024 Dr. Paul Janssen Award for Biomedical Research
- 2024 Albany Medical Center Prize in Medicine and Biomedical Research
