= Peng Loh =

American biochemist

Yoke Peng Loh
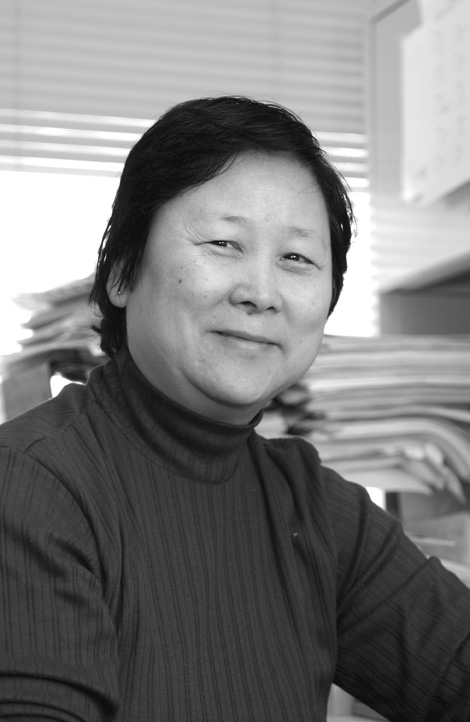
- Born: 1947 (age 78–79)
- Education: University College Dublin; University of Pennsylvania
- Scientific career
- Workplaces: Section on Cellular Neurobiology, Eunice Kennedy Shriver National Institute of Child Health and Human Development (NICHD), National Institutes of Health (NIH)

Yoke Peng Loh is an American biochemist and molecular biologist currently acting as Senior Investigator and Head at the Section on Cellular Neurobiology, Laboratory of Developmental Neurobiology, Eunice Kennedy Shriver National Institute of Child Health and Human Development (NICHD), National Institutes of Health (NIH). She earned a B.S. in biochemistry at University College Dublin in 1969 and a Ph.D. from the University of Pennsylvania in 1973. She did her postdoctoral work with Harold Gainer at NIH and at the Max Planck Institute in Germany.

== Research ==
Loh is recognized for her work in regulated secretory protein sorting in endocrine cells, protein processing and trafficking, mechanisms underlying the intracellular sorting of peptide hormones and neurotransmitters to the regulated secretory pathway, and key proteolytic events and enzymes involved in the processing of prohormones to biologically active peptides in the endocrine and nervous systems.

Loh has served as an academic advisor or editorial member for several journals: Molecular and Cellular Neurosciences (1995); Endocrinology (1997–2000); International Journal of Molecular Medicine (1997-); and Journal Molecular Neuroscience (2004-).

== Honors and awards ==
- 1986 Pfizer Traveling Scientist
- 1989 Public Health Service "Superior Service Award"; Superior Achievement Award in recognition of promoting Asian Pacific Islander American Activities and the mission of the NIH EEO Program.
- 1994 EEO Special Achievement Award for outstanding contributions to career development of Women Scientists.
- 1998 Asian Pacific American Organization Award for Outstanding Research.
- 1998 Women in Endocrinology Mentor's Award for Outstanding Research and Mentoring, especially in promoting the careers of women scientists.
- 1999 NIH Director's Award.
- 2000 Excellence in Science Award from the Federation of American Societies of Experimental Biology (FASEB): "The Excellence in Science Award recognizes outstanding achievement by women in biological science. Nominations recognize a woman whose career achievements have contributed significantly to further our understanding of a particular discipline by excellence in research." Dr Loh was awarded for Regulated Secretory Protein Sorting in Endocrine Cells: Unmasking Novel Signals, Receptors and Lipid Rafts.
- 2001 NIH Director's Award for Mentoring.
- 2014 Anita B. Roberts Lecture, an honor for distinguished women scientists at the NIH.
