= Susan Lindquist =

American geneticist (1949–2016)

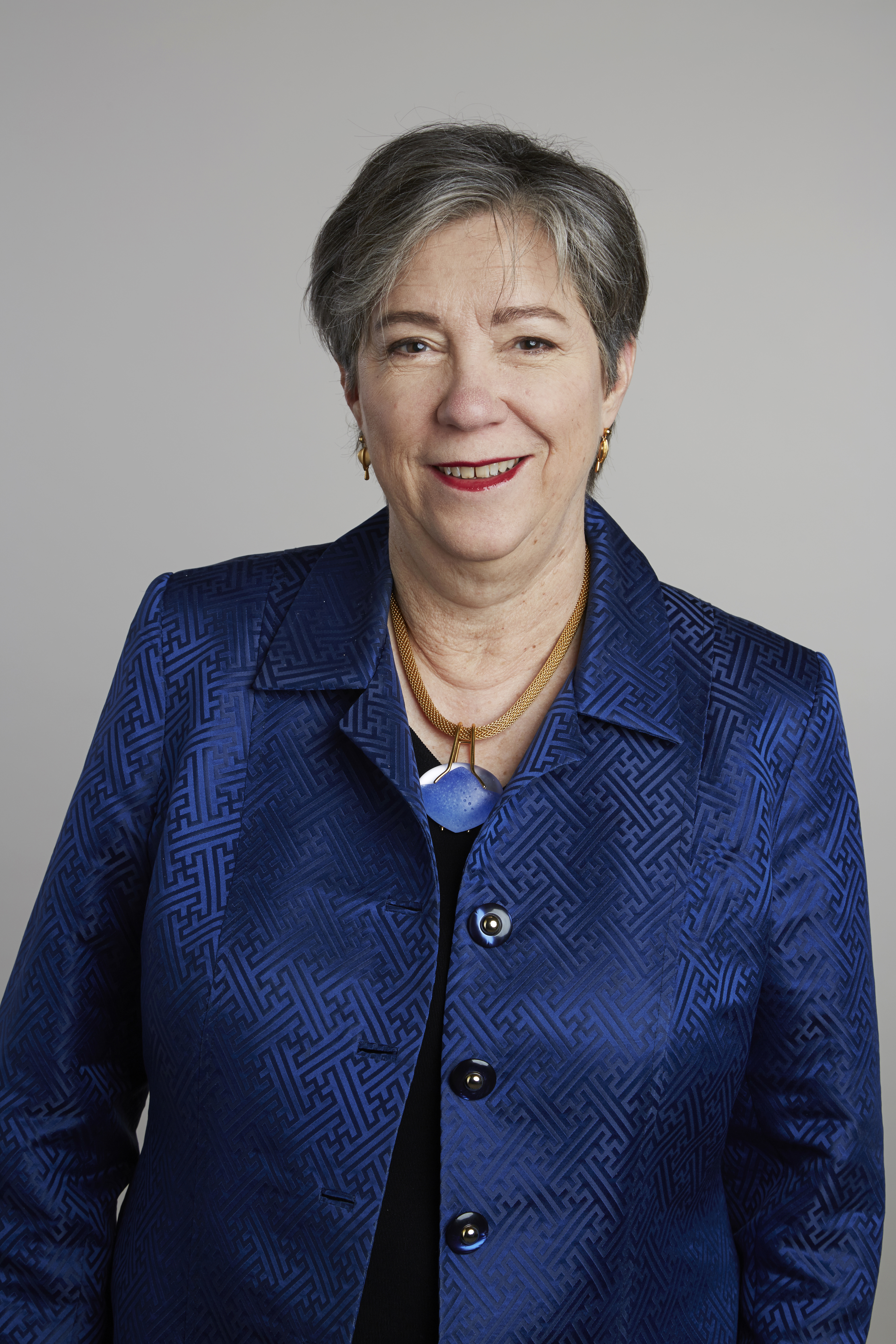
- Susan Lindquist in 2015, portrait via the Royal Society
- Born: Susan Lee Lindquist; June 5, 1949; Chicago, Illinois, U.S.
- Died: October 27, 2016 (aged 67); Boston, Massachusetts, U.S.
- Education: Harvard University; University of Illinois at Urbana–Champaign
- Known for: protein folding heat-shock proteins prions
- Awards: Dickson Prize (2003); Genetics Society of America Medal (2008); FASEB Excellence in Science Award (2009); National Medal of Science (2010); Mendel Medal (2010); E. B. Wilson Medal (2012)
- Scientific career
- Fields: Molecular biology
- Workplaces: Whitehead Institute; MIT; HHMI; University of Chicago
- Thesis: Protein and RNA synthesis induced by heat treatment in Drosophila melanogaster tissue culture cells (1976)
- Doctoral advisor: Matthew Meselson
- Website: lindquistlab.wi.mit.edu

Susan Lee Lindquist, ForMemRS (June 5, 1949 – October 27, 2016) was an American professor of biology at MIT specializing in molecular biology, particularly the protein folding problem within a family of molecules known as heat-shock proteins, and prions. Lindquist was a member and former director of the Whitehead Institute and was awarded the National Medal of Science in 2010.

== Early life and education ==
Lindquist was born in Chicago, Illinois, to Iver and Eleanor (née Maggio), and attended Maine South High School in Park Ridge.

Lindquist's father and mother were of Swedish and Italian descent, respectively, and although they expected her to become a housewife, Susan studied microbiology at the University of Illinois as an undergraduate and received her PhD in biology from Harvard University in 1976.

== Career ==
Upon completing her dissertation in 1976, Lindquist moved to the University of Chicago for a short post-doc with Hewson Swift before being hired as a faculty member in the Biology Department in 1978, becoming the Albert D. Lasker Professor of Medical Sciences with the founding of the Department of Molecular Genetics and Cell Biology in 1980. At the University of Chicago Lindquist investigated the role of heat shock proteins in regulating the cellular response to environmental stresses. Lindquist pioneered the use of yeast as a model system to study how heat shock proteins regulate gene expression and protein folding. For this work, Lindquist was made an investigator for the Howard Hughes Medical Institute in 1988. After making important new discoveries to prions, Lindquist moved to MIT in 2001 and was appointed as Director of the Whitehead Institute for Biomedical Research, one of the first women in the nation to lead a major independent research organization.

In 2004, Lindquist resumed research as an Institute Member, an associate member of the Broad Institute of MIT and Harvard, and an associate member of the David H. Koch Institute for Integrative Cancer Research at MIT.

Lindquist was awarded the National Medal of Science in 2009 (presented in 2010), for research contributions to protein folding.

Lindquist lectured nationally and internationally on a variety of scientific topics. In June 2006, she was the inaugural guest on the "Futures in Biotech" podcast on Leo Laporte's TWiT network. In 2007, she participated in the World Economic Forum in Davos, Switzerland with other MIT leaders.

Lindquist also co-founded two companies to translate research into potential therapies, FoldRx and Yumanity Therapeutics (with N. Anthony Coles), companies developing drug therapies for diseases of protein misfolding and amyloidosis.

In November 2016, Johnson & Johnson gave a $5 million gift to Whitehead Institute to establish the Susan Lindquist Chair for Women in Science in Lindquist's memory. The gift will be awarded to a female scientist at Whitehead Institute.

== Research ==
Lindquist is best known for her research that provided strong evidence for a new paradigm in genetics based upon the inheritance of proteins with new, self-perpetuating shapes rather than new DNA sequences. This research provided a biochemical framework for understanding devastating neurological illnesses such as Alzheimer's, Parkinson's, Huntington's, and Creutzfeldt–Jakob diseases. She was considered an expert in protein folding, which, as explained by Lindquist in the following excerpt, is an ancient, fundamental problem in biology:

What do "mad cows", people with neurodegenerative diseases, and an unusual type of inheritance in yeast have in common? They are all experiencing the consequences of misfolded proteins. ... In humans the consequences can be deadly, leading to such devastating illnesses as Alzheimer's Disease. In one case, the misfolded protein is not only deadly to the unfortunate individual in which it has appeared, but it can apparently be passed from one individual to another under special circumstances – producing infectious neurodegenerative diseases such as mad-cow disease in cattle and Creutzfeldt–Jacob Disease in humans.

Lindquist worked on the PSI+ element in yeast (a prion) and how it can act as a switch that hides or reveals numerous mutations throughout the genome, thus acting as an evolutionary capacitor. She proposed that a heat shock protein, hsp90, may act in the same way, normally preventing phenotypic consequences of genetic changes, but showing all changes at once when the HSP system is overloaded, either pharmacologically or under stressful environmental conditions.

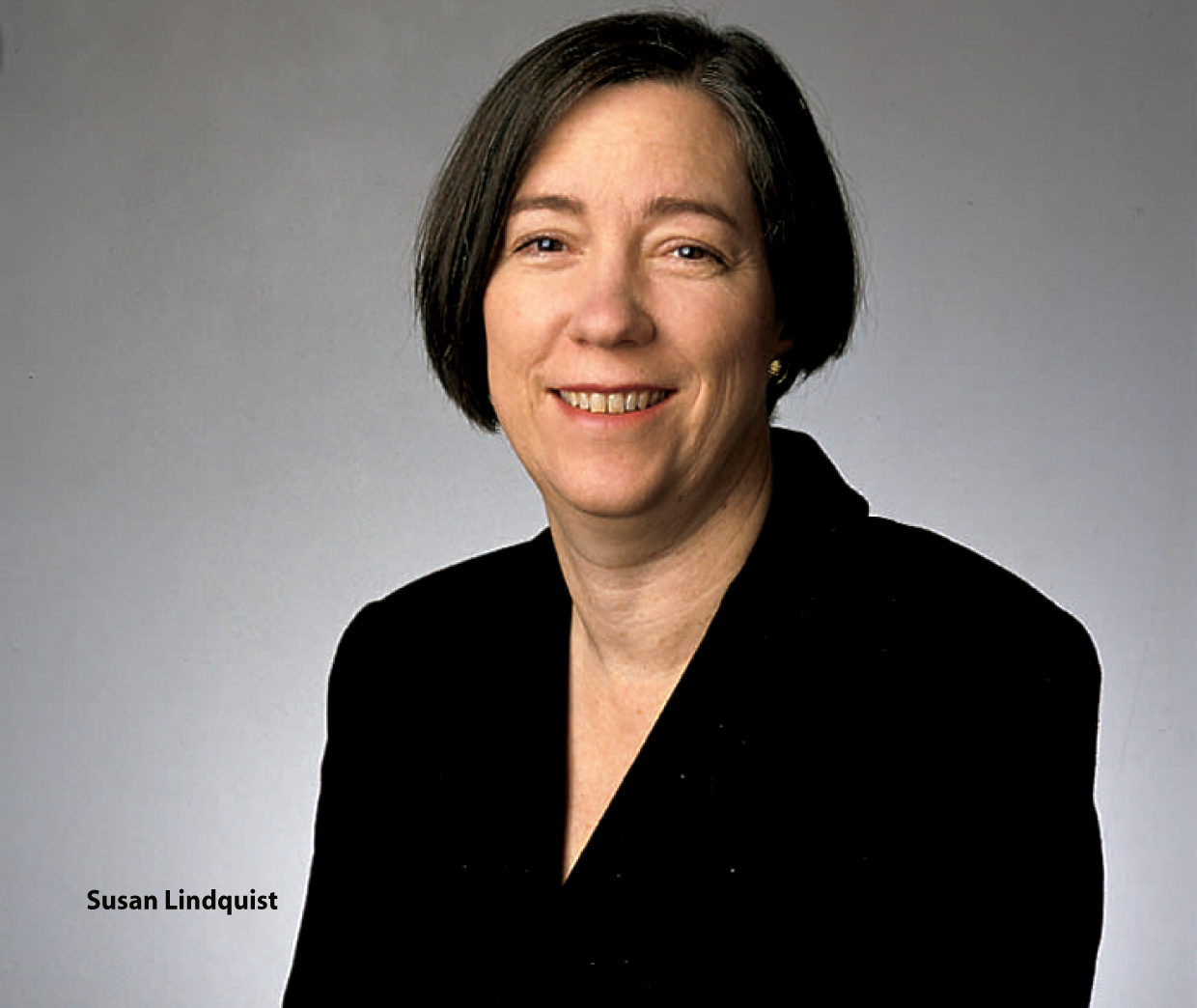
Susan Lindquist

Most of these variations are likely to be harmful, but a few unusual combinations may produce valuable new traits, spurring the pace of evolution. Cancer cells to have an extraordinary ability to evolve. Lindquist's lab investigates closely related evolutionary mechanisms involved in the progression of cancerous tumors and in the evolution of antibiotic-resistant fungi.

Lindquist made advances in nanotechnology, researching organic amyloid fibers capable of self-organizing into structures smaller than manufactured materials. Her group also developed a yeast "living test tube" model to study protein folding transitions in neurodegenerative diseases and to test therapeutic strategies through high-throughput screening.

=== Publications ===
- Tardiff DF, Jui NT, Khurana V, Tambe MA, Thompson ML, Chung CY, Kamadurai HB, Kim HT, Lancaster AK, Caldwell KA, Caldwell GA, Rochet JC, Buchwald SL, Lindquist S (2013). "Yeast reveal a "druggable" Rsp5/Nedd4 network that ameliorates α-synuclein toxicity in neurons". Science. 342 (6161): 979–83. Bibcode:2013Sci...342..979T. doi:10.1126/science.1245321. PMC 3993916. PMID 24158909.
- Chung CY, Khurana V, Auluck PK, Tardiff DF, Mazzulli JR, Soldner F, Baru V, Lou Y, Freyzon Y, Cho S, Mungenast AE, Muffat J, Mitalipova M, Pluth MD, Jui NT, Schüle B, Lippard SJ, Tsai LH, Krainc D, Buchwald SL, Jaenisch R, Lindquist S (2013). "Identification and rescue of α-synuclein toxicity in Parkinson patient-derived neurons". Science. 342 (6161): 983–7. Bibcode:2013Sci...342..983C. doi:10.1126/science.1245296. PMC 4022187. PMID 24158904.
- Jarosz, D. F.; Lindquist, S. (2010). "Hsp90 and Environmental Stress Transform the Adaptive Value of Natural Genetic Variation" (PDF). Science. 330 (6012): 1820–1824. Bibcode:2010Sci...330.1820J. doi:10.1126/science.1195487. PMC 3260023. PMID 21205668.
- Alberti, S.; Halfmann, R.; King, O.; Kapila, A.; Lindquist, S. (2009). "A Systematic Survey Identifies Prions and Illuminates Sequence Features of Prionogenic Proteins". Cell. 137 (1): 146–158. doi:10.1016/j.cell.2009.02.044. PMC 2683788. PMID 19345193..
- Gitler, A. D.; Chesi, A.; Geddie, M. L.; Strathearn, K. E.; Hamamichi, S.; Hill, K. J.; Caldwell, K. A.; Caldwell, G. A.; Cooper, A. A.; Rochet, J. C.; Lindquist, S. (2009). "Α-Synuclein is part of a diverse and highly conserved interaction network that includes PARK9 and manganese toxicity". Nature Genetics. 41 (3): 308–315. doi:10.1038/ng.300. PMC 2683786. PMID 19182805.
- Dai, C.; Whitesell, L.; Rogers, A. B.; Lindquist, S. (2007). "Heat Shock Factor 1 is a Powerful Multifaceted Modifier of Carcinogenesis". Cell. 130 (6): 1005–1018. doi:10.1016/j.cell.2007.07.020. PMC 2586609. PMID 17889646.
- Cooper, A. A.; Gitler, A.; Cashikar, A.; Haynes, C.; Hill, K.; Bhullar, B.; Liu, K.; Xu, K.; Strathearn, K.; Liu, F.; Cao, S.; Caldwell, K. A.; Caldwell, G. A.; Marsischky, G.; Kolodner, R. D.; Labaer, J.; Rochet, J. C.; Bonini, N. M.; Lindquist, S. (2006). "-Synuclein Blocks ER-Golgi Traffic and Rab1 Rescues Neuron Loss in Parkinson's Models". Science. 313 (5785): 324–328. Bibcode:2006Sci...313..324C. doi:10.1126/science.1129462. PMC 1983366. PMID 16794039.
- Cowen, L. E.; Lindquist, S. (2005). "Hsp90 Potentiates the Rapid Evolution of New Traits: Drug Resistance in Diverse Fungi". Science. 309 (5744): 2185–2189. Bibcode:2005Sci...309.2185C. doi:10.1126/science.1118370. PMID 16195452. S2CID 52847795.
- Krishnan, R.; Lindquist, S. L. (2005). "Structural insights into a yeast prion illuminate nucleation and strain diversity". Nature. 435 (7043): 765–772. Bibcode:2005Natur.435..765K. doi:10.1038/nature03679. PMC 1405905. PMID 15944694.
- Si, K.; Lindquist, S.; Kandel, E. (2003). "A neuronal isoform of the aplysia CPEB has prion-like properties". Cell. 115 (7): 879–891. doi:10.1016/S0092-8674(03)01020-1. PMID 14697205. S2CID 3060439.
- Queitsch, C.; Sangster, T. A.; Lindquist, S. (2002). "Hsp90 as a capacitor of phenotypic variation". Nature. 417 (6889): 618–624. Bibcode:2002Natur.417..618Q. doi:10.1038/nature749. PMID 12050657. S2CID 4419085.
- Serio, T.; Cashikar, A.; Kowal, A.; Sawicki, G.; Moslehi, J.; Serpell, L.; Arnsdorf, M.; Lindquist, S. (2000). "Nucleated conformational conversion and the replication of conformational information by a prion determinant". Science. 289 (5483): 1317–1321. Bibcode:2000Sci...289.1317S. doi:10.1126/science.289.5483.1317. PMID 10958771.
- Patino, M. M.; Liu, J. -J.; Glover, J. R.; Lindquist, S. (1996). "Support for the Prion Hypothesis for Inheritance of a Phenotypic Trait in Yeast". Science. 273 (5275): 622–626. Bibcode:1996Sci...273..622P. doi:10.1126/science.273.5275.622. PMC 1050929. PMID 8662547. S2CID 9760894.
- Lindquist, S. (1981). "Regulation of protein synthesis during heat shock". Nature. 293 (5830): 311–314. Bibcode:1981Natur.293..311L. doi:10.1038/293311a0. PMID 6792546. S2CID 4263197.

== Awards and honors ==
Lindquist won numerous awards and honors including:

- Elected to the American Academy of Arts and Sciences in 1996.
- Elected to the National Academy of Sciences in 1997.
- Named a fellow of the American Academy of Microbiology in 1997.
- Received the Novartis/Drew Award in Biomedical Research in 2000.
- Received the Dickson Prize in Medicine in 2003.
- Elected to the American Philosophical Society in 2003.
- Named one of the 50 most important women in science by Discover Magazine in 2002.
- Awarded the Sigma Xi William Procter Prize for Scientific Achievement in 2006.
- Elected to the Institute of Medicine of the National Academies in 2006.
- Awarded the Genetics Society of America Medal in 2008.
- Awarded the Otto Warburg Medal by the German Society for Biochemistry and Molecular Biology in 2008.
- Awarded the FASEB Excellence in Science Award in 2009.
- Awarded the Max Delbrück Medal, Berlin, Germany, in 2010.
- Awarded the Mendel Medal by The Genetics Society, UK, in 2010.
- Awarded the National Medal of Science (for 2009) in 2010.
- Made an Associate Member of the European Molecular Biology Organization in 2011.
- Awarded the E.B. Wilson Medal by The American Society for Cell Biology in 2012.
- Awarded the Vanderbilt University School of Medicine Vanderbilt Prize for Women's Excellence in Science and Mentorship in 2014.
- Elected a Foreign Member of the Royal Society (ForMemRS) in 2015.
- Vallee Visiting Professorship (2015)
- Awarded the Albany Medical Center Prize in Medicine and Biomedical Research with F. Ulrich Hartl and Arthur Horwich in 2016.
- Awarded (posthumously) the Rosenstiel Award in 2016.

== Personal life ==
Lindquist was married to Edward Buckbee and had two daughters. She died of cancer in Boston at the age of 67 on October 27, 2016.
