= Eleanor Zaimis =

British pharmacologist

Eleanor Christides Zaimis
- Born: Eleanor Christides; 16 June 1915; Galați, Romania
- Died: 3 October 1982 (aged 67); Athens, Greece
- Education: University of Athens
- Awards: Cameron Prize for Therapeutics of the University of Edinburgh (1956); Gairdner Foundation International Award (1959)
- Scientific career
- Fields: Pharmacology

Eleanor Christides Zaimis (16 June 1915 – 3 October 1982) was a Greek-British academic who was professor at Royal Free Hospital School of Medicine, often referred to as "Nora". She was the recipient of the 1959 Gairdner Foundation International Award for study of methonium compounds and other pharmacology contributions.

Zaimis was elected to the British Pharmacological Society Hall of Fame.

== Early life and education ==
Zaimis was born in Galați, Romania. Her father, John Cristides worked in shipping and her mother, Helen Hanoutsos was the daughter of a landowner. She was educated at the Greek Gymnasium and graduated in medicine at the University of Athens in 1938. During the next nine years, she gained an MD and a BSc in chemistry.

== Career ==
After graduating in medicine, she was an assistant to the professor of pharmacology at the University of Athens and she from 1945 she served on a committee for evaluating new antibiotics such as penicillin and streptomycin. In 1947, she went to England as a British Council scholar where she initially worked in the department of pharmacology at Bristol University and later at the National Institute for Medical Research, she then moved to the department of pharmacology at the school of pharmacy, University of London.

In 1950, she was elected as an associate to the Physiological Society and eventually, became a full member in 1951. In 1954, she was appointed as a reader and head of the pharmacology department at the Royal Free Hospital School of Medicine. In 1956, she was awarded the Cameron Prize for Therapeutics of the University of Edinburgh. She was awarded a professorship by the Royal Free Hospital School of Medicine in 1958 and she remained head of the department until her retirement in 1980. During this time, she made significant contributions to the fields of neuromuscular and cardiovascular pharmacology.

In 1958, she received the Gairdner Foundation international award. In 1962, she was awarded the Cross of Commander of the Greek Order of Benevolence and in 1968, she received the NP Kravkov pharmacology medal from the USSR Academy of Medical Sciences. Between 1967 and 1971, she was on the committee of the Physiological Society. She was made an honorary member of the Rome Academy of Medicine and a corresponding member of the Academy of Athens.

Her outstanding worked (with William Paton) was on methonium compounds and synthesized the remaining members of what is referred to as the methonium series, including compounds such as hexamethonium and decamethonium. Both of these compounds are important in medicine, the first is used for hypertension and the second is used by anaesthetists to control muscles. She was one of the first scientists to realize the importance of researching the chronic effect of minimal drug use, as well as the acute effect.

== Death and legacy ==
She died in 1982 and she was elected to the British Pharmacological Society Hall of Fame in 2015.

== Publications ==
- Textbook on Hygiene, 1948
- Evaluation of new drugs in man, 1963
- Nerve growth factor and its antiserum, 1972
- Neuromuscular junction, 1976
