= Bettie Sue Masters =

American biochemist

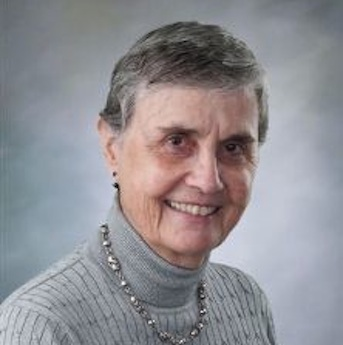
- Born: 1937 (age 88–89); Lexington, Virginia
- Education: Roanoke College (B.S.); Duke University (Ph.D.)
- Spouse: Robert Sherman Masters
- Children: 2
- Scientific career
- Fields: Biochemistry
- Thesis: The mechanism of hepatic microsomal triphosphopyridine nucleotide-cytochrome c reductase (1963)
- Doctoral advisor: Henry Kamin PhD

Bettie Sue Siler Masters is an American biochemist who is adjunct professor at Duke University known for her work on nitric oxide synthase and cytochrome P450 reductase. She was the 1992 recipient of the FASEB Excellence in Science Award, and has been elected as a member of the National Academy of Medicine and as a fellow of the American Association for the Advancement of Science.

== Early life and education ==
Masters was born in Lexington, Virginia, where her father was a radio announcer and a singer. As a child she was an avid reader of Sherlock Holmes and Dr. Watson whose analytical skills she admired. She became interested in chemistry during her sophomore year in high school, and placed high enough in the Westinghouse Science Talent Search to receive a scholarship for college. After the College of William & Mary would not honor the scholarship because she was a woman, she went on to attend Roanoke College, thereby becoming a first-generation college student. She graduated from Roanoke College in 1959 with a B.S. in chemistry. In 1963, she earned her Ph.D. in biochemistry from Duke University.

== Career ==
Following her Ph.D. work, she conducted postdoctoral research first with fellowship support from the American Cancer Society and then with grant support from the American Heart Association. In 1968, she moved to the University of Texas Southwestern Medical School where she established her independent laboratory and advanced through the ranks to Full Professor. In 1982, she moved to the Medical College of Wisconsin to accept the position as chair of the department of biochemistry, thereby becoming the first woman to hold this position at that institution. In 1990, she moved to the University of Texas Health Science Center at San Antonio where she was named as the first Robert A. Welch Distinguished Professor in Chemistry. Upon retirement after half a century of research, she became an adjunct professor at Duke University in the department of biochemistry to continue her career as a teacher of graduate students.

== Research ==
Masters is recognized for her work on the structure and function of enzymes. As a graduate student she characterized the kinetics and mechanism NADPH-cytochrome P450 reductase (NADPH-cytochrome P450 oxidoreductase). She went on to develop methods to purify enzymes, such as cytochrome P450 reductase and the three isoforms of nitric oxide synthase, which allows investigation into their biochemical properties and identification of the active sites of the proteins through x-ray crystallography. In collaboration with the laboratory of Dr. Jung-Ja Kim, the crystal structure of NADPH-cytochrome P450 reductase was determined. Concerning nitric oxide synthases, Masters examined the atomic structure of the endothelial isoenzyme, the zinc bound within the protein, and the co-factors required (heme and tetrahydrobiopterin).

== Selected publications ==
- Vásquez-Vivar, Jeannette; Kalyanaraman, B.; Martásek, Pavel; Hogg, Neil; Masters, Bettie Sue Siler; Karoui, Hakim; Tordo, Paul; Pritchard, Kirkwood A. (1998-08-04). "Superoxide generation by endothelial nitric oxide synthase: The influence of cofactors". Proceedings of the National Academy of Sciences. 95 (16): 9220–9225. Bibcode:1998PNAS...95.9220V. doi:10.1073/pnas.95.16.9220. ISSN 0027-8424. PMC 21319. PMID 9689061.
- Roman, L J; Sheta, E A; Martasek, P; Gross, S S; Liu, Q; Masters, B S (1995-08-29). "High-level expression of functional rat neuronal nitric oxide synthase in Escherichia coli". Proceedings of the National Academy of Sciences. 92 (18): 8428–8432. Bibcode:1995PNAS...92.8428R. doi:10.1073/pnas.92.18.8428. ISSN 0027-8424. PMC 41170. PMID 7545302.
- McMillan, K; Bredt, D S; Hirsch, D J; Snyder, S H; Clark, J E; Masters, B S (1992). "Cloned, expressed rat cerebellar nitric oxide synthase contains stoichiometric amounts of heme, which binds carbon monoxide". Proceedings of the National Academy of Sciences. 89 (23): 11141–11145. Bibcode:1992PNAS...8911141M. doi:10.1073/pnas.89.23.11141. ISSN 0027-8424. PMC 50505. PMID 1280819.
- Yasukochi, Y; Masters, B S (1976). "Some properties of a detergent-solubilized NADPH-cytochrome c(cytochrome P-450) reductase purified by biospecific affinity chromatography". Journal of Biological Chemistry. 251 (17): 5337–5344. doi:10.1016/s0021-9258(17)33166-6. ISSN 0021-9258. PMID 821951.

== Awards and honors ==
Masters has received numerous honors and awards. Roanoke College, her alma mater, awarded her the Roanoke College Medal for her distinguished service to her community and her profession. In 1983, she received an Honorary Doctor of Science degree from Roanoke College.

In 1990, Masters was recruited to the University of Texas Health Science Center at San Antonio as the first Robert A. Welch Distinguished Professor in Chemistry. In 1992, Masters received the Excellence in Science Award from the Federation of American Societies for Experimental Biology (FASEB). In 2000, she was the recipient of the Bernard B. Brodie Award in Drug Metabolism from the American Society for Pharmacology and Experimental Therapeutics (ASPET). In 1996, Masters was elected as a member of the National Academy of Medicine (NAM) and, in 2001, she was elected as a fellow of the American Association for the Advancement of Science (AAAS). In 2005, Charles University (Prague) awarded Masters an honorary medical degree, Doctorem Medicinae Honoris Causae, in recognition of her work. In 2022, the Medical College of Wisconsin (MCW) awarded Masters an honorary Doctor of Science degree in recognition of her leadership role in the field of biochemistry and her contributions to medical scientist training (via initiation of MCW's MD/PhD training program--Medical Scientist Training Program). In 2024, Masters was named a fellow of the American Society for Biochemistry and Molecular Biology (ASBMB).

== Personal life ==
Bettie Sue Masters was married to Robert Sherman Masters for 53 years before his death in 2013. They had two daughters, Diane Elizabeth Masters and Deborah Masters Camitta, who presented them with three grandchildren.
