= Dr. Paul Janssen Award for Biomedical Research =

Biomedical research award

The Dr. Paul Janssen Award for Biomedical Research is given annually by Johnson & Johnson to honor the work of an active scientist in academia, industry or a scientific institute in the field of biomedical research. It was established in 2004 and perpetuates the memory of Paul Janssen, the founder of Janssen Pharmaceutica, a Johnson & Johnson subsidiary.

== The Award ==
The Dr. Paul Janssen Award includes a $200,000 prize and acknowledges the work of an individual who has made a significant, transformational contribution toward the improvement of human health.

Johnson & Johnson created the award in 2004 with the following goals:

- To honor the memory of Janssen, his dedication to excellence and his leadership of young scientists
- To promote, recognize and reward passion and creativity in biomedical research
- To underscore Johnson & Johnson's commitment to scientific excellence in the advancement of healthcare knowledge, while fulfilling its responsibility in the community

== Paul Adriaan Jan Janssen (1926–2003) ==
Known to his colleagues as “Dr. Paul,” Janssen was the founder of Janssen Pharmaceutica, N.V., a pharmaceutical research laboratory based in Beerse, Belgium, and a physician-scientist who helped save millions of lives through his contribution to the discovery and development of more than 80 medicines. His work was responsible for many breakthroughs in several fields of disease, including pain management, psychiatry, infectious disease and gastroenterology. In addition, he has more than 100 patents to his name.

== Recipients ==
Source: Jannsen

Participants at the 2008 Dr. Paul Janssen Award for Biomedical Research Symposium at the New York Academy of Sciences in New York

- 2006: Craig C. Mello, a professor of Molecular Medicine at the University of Massachusetts Medical School, Worcester, MA, and an investigator at the Howard Hughes Medical Institute, for his role in the discovery of RNA interference (RNAi) and the elucidation of its biological functions
- 2008: Professor Marc Feldmann and Emeritus Professor Sir Ravinder N. Maini of The Kennedy Institute of Rheumatology, Imperial College London, for their role in the discovery of tumor necrosis factor-alpha, or TNF-alpha, as an effective therapeutic target for rheumatoid arthritis and other autoimmune diseases.
- 2009: Axel Ullrich, director of the Department of Molecular Biology, Max Planck Institute of Biochemistry in Germany, for his pioneering work in applying molecular biology and molecular cloning to the discovery of protein therapeutics for the treatment of a wide range of diseases, including diabetes and cancer.
- 2010: Anthony S. Fauci, Director of the National Institute of Allergy and Infectious Diseases (NIAID) and Erik De Clercq, Professor Emeritus, Rega Institute for Medical Research. Dr. Fauci received the award for his pioneering contributions to basic and clinical research in the areas of AIDS and other immunodeficiencies, both as a scientist and through his service as the Director of the NIAID. Dr. De Clercq was recognized for his landmark discoveries in anti-HIV medications, including nucleotide analogues, and inventions or co-inventions of several approved drugs for anti-viral therapy.
- 2011: Napoleone Ferrara, Genentech Fellow, for his research on angiogenesis, the process of new blood vessel formation that plays a key role in cancer proliferation and a number of other diseases. Dr. Ferrara’s discoveries opened the door to the development of a new class of therapeutics to combat a serious eye disorder and contributed to the development of new oncology therapeutics.
- 2012: Victor Ambros, of the University of Massachusetts Medical School, and Gary Ruvkun of Massachusetts General Hospital and Harvard Medical School, for their collaborative discovery of microRNAs (miRNAs) as central regulators of gene expression and development.
- 2013: David Julius, chair of the Department of Physiology at the University of California, San Francisco for his discovery of the molecular mechanism that controls thermosensation.
- 2014: Emmanuelle Charpentier, Professor at the Hannover Medical School and Helmholtz Centre for Infection Research (HZI), Germany and The Laboratory for Molecular Infection Medicine Sweden (MIMS), Umeå University, Sweden and Jennifer Doudna, a Howard Hughes Medical Institute Investigator and Li Ka Shing Professor of Biochemistry, Biophysics and Structural Biology, University of California, Berkeley, for their work on a new method for precise and facile genomic editing.
- 2015: Bert Vogelstein, Johns Hopkins University, Johns Hopkins Kimmel Cancer Center and the Howard Hughes Medical Institute, for his breakthroughs in oncology research.
- 2016: Yoshinori Ohsumi, Professor, Frontier Research Center, Tokyo Institute of Technology, Yokohama, Japan, for his pioneering discoveries in the field of autophagy.
- 2017: Douglas C. Wallace, Founder and Director, Center for Mitochondrial and Epigenomic Medicine, Children’s Hospital of Philadelphia; Professor of Pathology and Laboratory Medicine, Perelman School of Medicine, University of Pennsylvania, for pioneering the field of human mitochondrial genetics and its application to the study of disease, aging, and patterns of human migration.
- 2018: James P. Allison, Professor and Chair, Department of Immunology, University of Texas MD Anderson Cancer Center, for pioneering a novel and effective strategy to harness the immune system for treating solid tumor cancers.
- 2019: Franz-Ulrich Hartl, Director, Max Planck Institute of Biochemistry and Arthur Horwich, Sterling Professor of Genetics and Professor of Pediatrics, Yale School of Medicine and Investigator, Howard Hughes Medical Institute, for their revolutionary insights into chaperone-mediated protein folding.
- 2020: Lewis C. Cantley
- 2021: Katalin Karikó
- 2022: Jeffrey I. Gordon
- 2023: Robert Langer
- 2024: Lynne Maquat

== See also ==
- List of medicine awards
- List of prizes named after people
