= Velusetrag =

Chemical compound

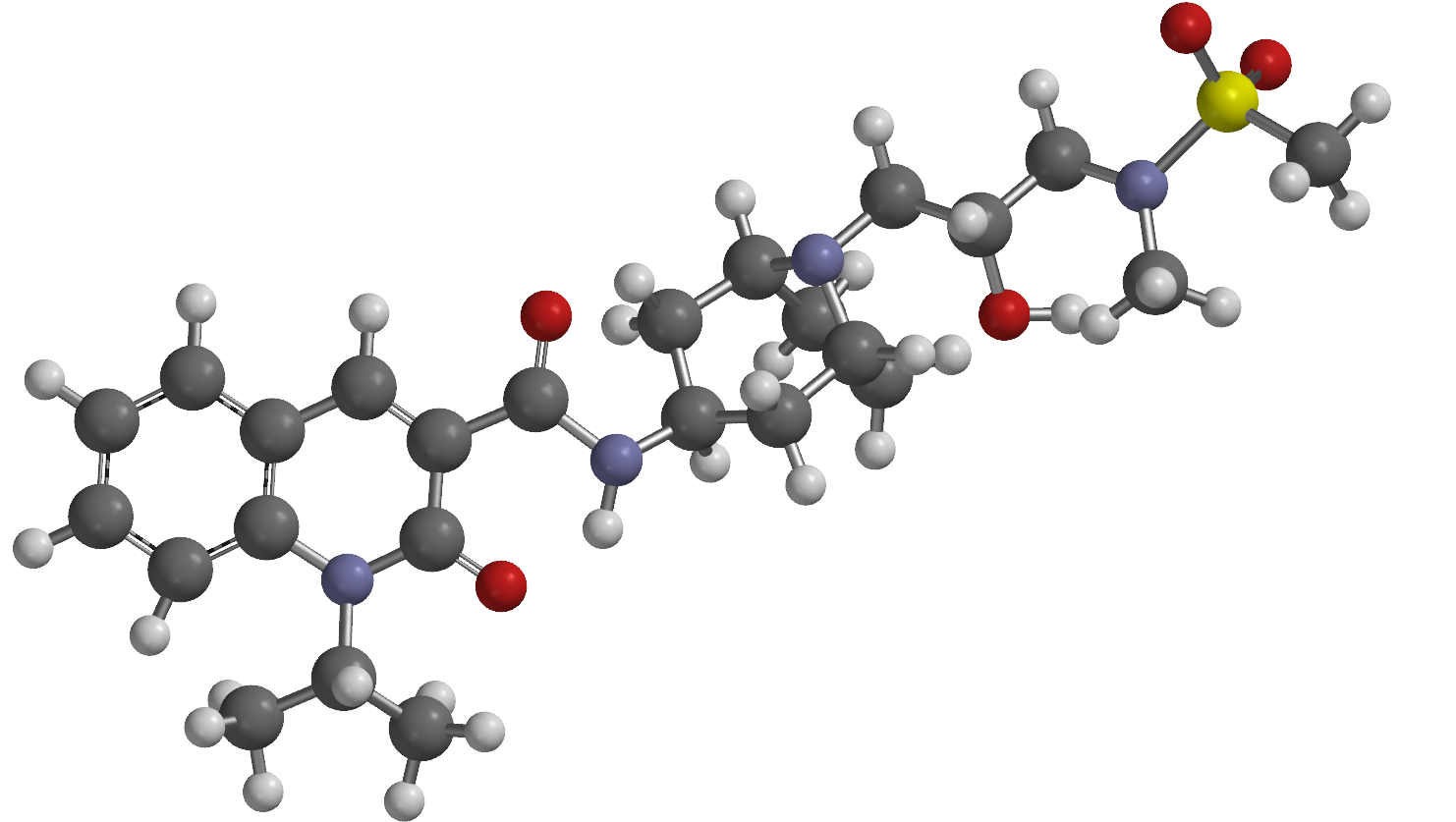

Clinical data
- Other names: N-[(3-endo)-8-{(2R)-2-Hydroxy-3-[methyl(methylsulfonyl)amino]propyl}-8-azabicyclo[3.2.1]oct-3-yl]-1-isopropyl-2-oxo-1,2-dihydro-3-quinolinecarboxamide
- Routes of administration: Oral
- ATC code: None

Legal status
- Legal status: US: Investigational New Drug

Identifiers
- IUPAC name: N-((1R,3r,5S)-8-{(2R)-2-hydroxy-3-[(methanesulfonyl)(methyl)amino]propyl}-8-azabicyclo[3.2.1]octan-3-yl)-2-oxo-1-(propan-2-yl)-1H-quinoline-3-carboxamide
- CAS Number: 866933-46-2 866933-51-9 (hydrochloride)
- PubChem CID: 53297466
- IUPHAR/BPS: 8425
- ChemSpider: 28527582
- UNII: J4VNV64ARB
- KEGG: D09693
- ChEMBL: ChEMBL2087337

Chemical and physical data
- Formula: C_{25}H_{36}N_{4}O_{5}S
- Molar mass: 504.65 g·mol^{−1}
- 3D model (JSmol): Interactive image
- SMILES: CC(C)n1c(=O)c(C(=O)N[C@H]2C[C@H]3CC[C@@H](C2)N3C[C@@H](O)CN(C)S(C)(=O)=O)cc2ccccc21
- InChI: InChI=1S/C25H36N4O5S/c1-16(2)29-23-8-6-5-7-17(23)11-22(25(29)32)24(31)26-18-12-19-9-10-20(13-18)28(19)15-21(30)14-27(3)35(4,33)34/h5-8,11,16,18-21,30H,9-10,12-15H2,1-4H3,(H,26,31)/t18-,19+,20-,21-/m0/s1; Key:HXLOHDZQBKCUCR-WOZUAGRISA-N

Velusetrag (INN, USAN; previously known as TD-5108) is an experimental drug candidate for the treatment of gastric neuromuscular disorders including gastroparesis, and lower gastrointestinal motility disorders including chronic idiopathic constipation and irritable bowel syndrome. It is a potent, selective, high efficacy 5-HT_{4} receptor serotonin agonist being developed by Theravance Biopharma and Alfa Wassermann. Velusetrag demonstrates less selectivity for other serotonin receptors, such as 5-HT_{2} and 5-HT_{3}, to earlier generation 5-HT agonists like cisapride and tegaserod.

In a large clinical trial in patients with chronic idiopathic constipation (n=401), velusetrag statistically and clinically improved the frequency and consistency of complete spontaneous bowel movements (CSBMs) compared to placebo. Doses of 15 and 30 mg were well tolerated compared to placebo.

Velusetrag showed accelerated intestinal and colonic transit after single dosing and accelerated gastric emptying after multiple dosing in healthy volunteer subjects. In addition, velusetrag showed accelerated gastric emptying in patients with diabetic or idiopathic gastroparesis. The proportion of patients who experienced at least a 20% improvement is gastric emptying ranged from 20% to 52% for velusetrag dosed patients and 5% for placebo patients.

On December 6, 2016, Theravance Biopharma announced that the U.S. Food and Drug Administration (FDA) has granted Fast Track designation to velusetrag for the treatment of symptoms associated with diabetic and idiopathic Gastroparesis.

As of May 10, 2017, Velusetrag is being studied, at doses of 5, 15 and 30 mg over a 12-week treatment period, for symptomatic improvement in patients with diabetic or idiopathic gastroparesis in the DIGEST study.

== See also ==
- Prucalopride
