= Etanercept =

Biopharmaceutical for autoimmune diseases

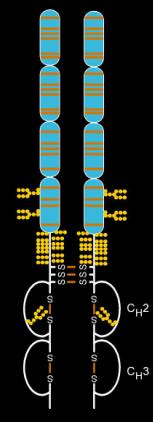

Clinical data
- Trade names: Enbrel
- Biosimilars: etanercept-szzs, etanercept-ykro, Benepali, Brenzys, Erelzi, Etacept, Etera, Eticovo, Fubelv, Lifmior, Nepexto, Rymti
- AHFS/Drugs.com: Monograph
- MedlinePlus: a602013
- License data: US DailyMed: Etanercept
- Pregnancy category: AU: D
- Routes of administration: Subcutaneous
- ATC code: L04AB01 (WHO)

Legal status
- Legal status: AU: S4 (Prescription only); CA: ℞-only / Schedule D; UK: POM (Prescription only); US: ℞-only; EU: Rx-only

Pharmacokinetic data
- Bioavailability: 58–76% (SC)
- Elimination half-life: 70–132 hours

Identifiers
- CAS Number: 185243-69-0
- PubChem SID: 7847807
- DrugBank: DB00005
- ChemSpider: None
- UNII: OP401G7OJC
- KEGG: D00742
- ChEMBL: ChEMBL1201572
- CompTox Dashboard (EPA): DTXSID8040850
- ECHA InfoCard: 100.224.383

Chemical and physical data
- Formula: C_{2224}H_{3475}N_{621}O_{698}S_{36}
- Molar mass: 51235.07 g·mol^{−1}

Etanercept, sold under the brand name Enbrel among others, is a biologic medical product that is used to treat autoimmune diseases by interfering with tumor necrosis factor (TNF), a soluble inflammatory cytokine, by acting as a TNF inhibitor. It has US Food and Drug Administration (FDA) approval to treat rheumatoid arthritis, juvenile idiopathic arthritis and psoriatic arthritis, plaque psoriasis and ankylosing spondylitis. TNF is the "master regulator" of the inflammatory (immune) response in many organ systems. Autoimmune diseases are caused by an overactive immune response. Etanercept has the potential to treat these diseases by inhibiting TNF.

Etanercept is a fusion protein produced by recombinant DNA. It fuses the TNF receptor to the constant end of the IgG1 antibody. First, the developers isolated the DNA sequence that codes the human gene for soluble TNF receptor 2, which is a receptor that binds to tumor necrosis factor. Second, they isolated the DNA sequence that codes the human gene for the Fc end of immunoglobulin G1 (IgG1). Third, they linked the DNA for TNF receptor 2 to the DNA for IgG1 Fc. Finally, they expressed the linked DNA to produce a protein that links the protein for TNF receptor 2 to the protein for IgG1 Fc.

The prototypic fusion protein was first synthesized and shown to be highly active and unusually stable as a modality for blockade of TNF in vivo in the early 1990s by Bruce A. Beutler, an academic researcher then at the University of Texas Southwestern Medical Center at Dallas, and his colleagues.

These investigators also patented the protein, selling all rights to its use to Immunex, a Seattle biotechnology company that was acquired by Amgen in 2002.

It is a large molecule, with a molecular weight of 150 kDa, that binds to TNFα and decreases its role in disorders involving excess inflammation in humans and other animals, including autoimmune diseases such as ankylosing spondylitis, juvenile rheumatoid arthritis, psoriasis, psoriatic arthritis, rheumatoid arthritis, and, potentially, in a variety of other disorders mediated by excess TNFα. Etanercept is a therapeutic alternative on the World Health Organization's List of Essential Medicines.

== Medical uses ==
In the United States, etanercept is indicated for:

- Moderate to severe rheumatoid arthritis (RA) (November 1998)
- Moderate to severe polyarticular juvenile rheumatoid arthritis (May 1999)
- Psoriatic arthritis (January 2002)
- Ankylosing spondylitis (AS) (July 2003)
- Moderate to severe plaque psoriasis (April 2004)

In the European Union, etanercept is indicated to treat:

- moderate to severe active rheumatoid arthritis
- severe, active and progressive rheumatoid arthritis
- juvenile idiopathic arthritis
- polyarthritis (rheumatoid-factor-positive or -negative) and extended oligoarthritis in children and adolescents
- active and progressive psoriatic arthritis
- enthesitis-related arthritis
- axial spondyloarthritis
- severe active ankylosing spondylitis
- severe non-radiographic axial spondyloarthritis
- moderate to severe plaque psoriasis
- chronic severe plaque psoriasis pediatric plaque psoriasis

=== Unrecognized uses ===
An American physician, Edward Tobinick, has attempted to use etanercept to treat chronic neurological dysfunction after stroke and brain injury and issued US and foreign patents. Writing for Science-Based Medicine, Steven Novella said that it was "unethical for physicians to practice outside of their area of competence and expertise". Tobinick sued Novella in response, and lost. Of this treatment, the American Academy of Neurology advise "there is insufficient evidence to determine its effectiveness and that the treatment may be associated with adverse outcomes and high cost".

== Adverse effects ==
On 2 May 2008, the US Food and Drug Administration (FDA) placed a black box warning on etanercept due to a number of serious infections associated with the drug. Serious infections and sepsis, including fatalities, have been reported with the use of etanercept including reactivation of latent tuberculosis and hepatitis B infections.

Injection site reactions such as redness and pain are common, occurring in approximately 11.4% of cases.

== Mechanism of action ==
Etanercept reduces the effect of naturally present TNF, and hence is a TNF inhibitor, functioning as a decoy receptor that binds to TNF.

Tumor necrosis factor (TNF) is a cytokine produced by lymphocytes and macrophages, two types of white blood cells. It mediates the immune response by attracting additional white blood cells to sites of inflammation and through additional molecular mechanisms that initiate and amplify inflammation. Inhibition of its action by etanercept reduces the inflammatory response, which is especially useful for treating autoimmune diseases.

There are two types of TNF receptors: those found embedded in white blood cells that respond to TNF by releasing other cytokines, and soluble TNF receptors that are used to deactivate TNF and blunt the immune response. In addition, TNF receptors are found on the surface of virtually all nucleated cells (red blood cells, which are not nucleated, do not contain TNF receptors on their surface). Etanercept mimics the inhibitory effects of naturally occurring soluble TNF receptors, the difference being that etanercept, because it is a fusion protein rather than a simple TNF receptor, has a greatly extended half-life in the bloodstream, and therefore a more profound and long-lasting biologic effect than a naturally occurring soluble TNF receptor.

== Structure ==
Etanercept is made from the combination of two naturally occurring soluble human 75-kilodalton TNF receptors linked to an Fc portion of an IgG1. The effect is an artificially engineered dimeric fusion protein. Etanercept is a complex molecule containing 6 N-glycans, up to 14 O-glycans and 29 disulfide bridge structures.

== History ==
The first etanercept-related patent was filed by Immunex in September 1989. The fusion protein was developed by Bruce A. Beutler, an academic researcher then at the University of Texas Southwestern Medical Center at Dallas, and colleagues, who patented it and licensed the rights in 1995 to Immunex. Another patent on such fusion protein technology from Brian Seed at Massachusetts General Hospital was licensed to Immmunex in 1997.

Etanercept was approved for use in the United States in November 1998.

Etanercept was approved for use in the European Union in February 2000.

== Society and culture ==
=== Economics ===
The US retail price of etanercept has risen over time. In 2008, the cost of etanercept was $1,500 per month or $18,000 per year. By 2011, the cost had exceeded $20,000 per year. In 2013, a survey by the International Federation of Health Plans (IFHP) found that the average US cost for etanercept was $2,225 per month, or $26,700 per year. The IFHP report also found wide variation in prices charged to various US health plans, between $1,946 per month at the 25th percentile and $4,006 per month at the 95th percentile.

Etanercept is more expensive in the US than in other countries. As of 2013, average monthly costs in surveyed nations ranged from $1,017 in Switzerland to $1,646 in Canada, compared to an average monthly cost of $2,225 per month in the US.

Amgen sells etanercept within the US and Canada, while Pfizer, Inc. sells the drug outside of the US and Canada. Sales within the US and Canada were $3.5 billion in 2010. Sales of etanercept outside the US and Canada were $3.3 billion in 2010.

In late March 2025, Amgen lost a lawsuit against Colorado over a prescription drug affordability board.

=== Patents ===
The patent on etanercept was set to expire in October 2012, but, in the United States, a second patent, granting exclusivity for another 16 years, has been granted.

Before the extension it seemed unlikely that a generic would have been available. As a biologic, etanercept is subject to different laws from those applicable to chemical formulations. Many countries do not permit the manufacture of generic biologics. However, the European Union and the United States (Biologics Price Competition and Innovation Act of 2009) do have in place a system to approve generic biologics (biosimilars) which "requires mandatory clinical testing and periodic review".

In April 2013, the Indian pharma major Cipla made an announcement about launching the first biosimilar of Etanercept in India under the brand name Etacept for the treatment of rheumatic disorders.

=== Biosimilars ===
In January 2016, Benepali was approved for use in the European Union.

In February 2017, Lifmior was approved for use in the European Union. It was withdrawn from the market in February 2020.

In June 2017, Erelzi was approved for use in the European Union.

In March 2019, YLB113 (Etanercept biosimilar by YL Biologics) was approved in Japan.

In April 2019, Eticovo received FDA approval.

In May 2020, Nepexto was approved for use in the European Union.

Rymti and Etera were approved for medical use in Australia in October 2020.
