= Anita Roberts =

American biologist

Anita B. Roberts
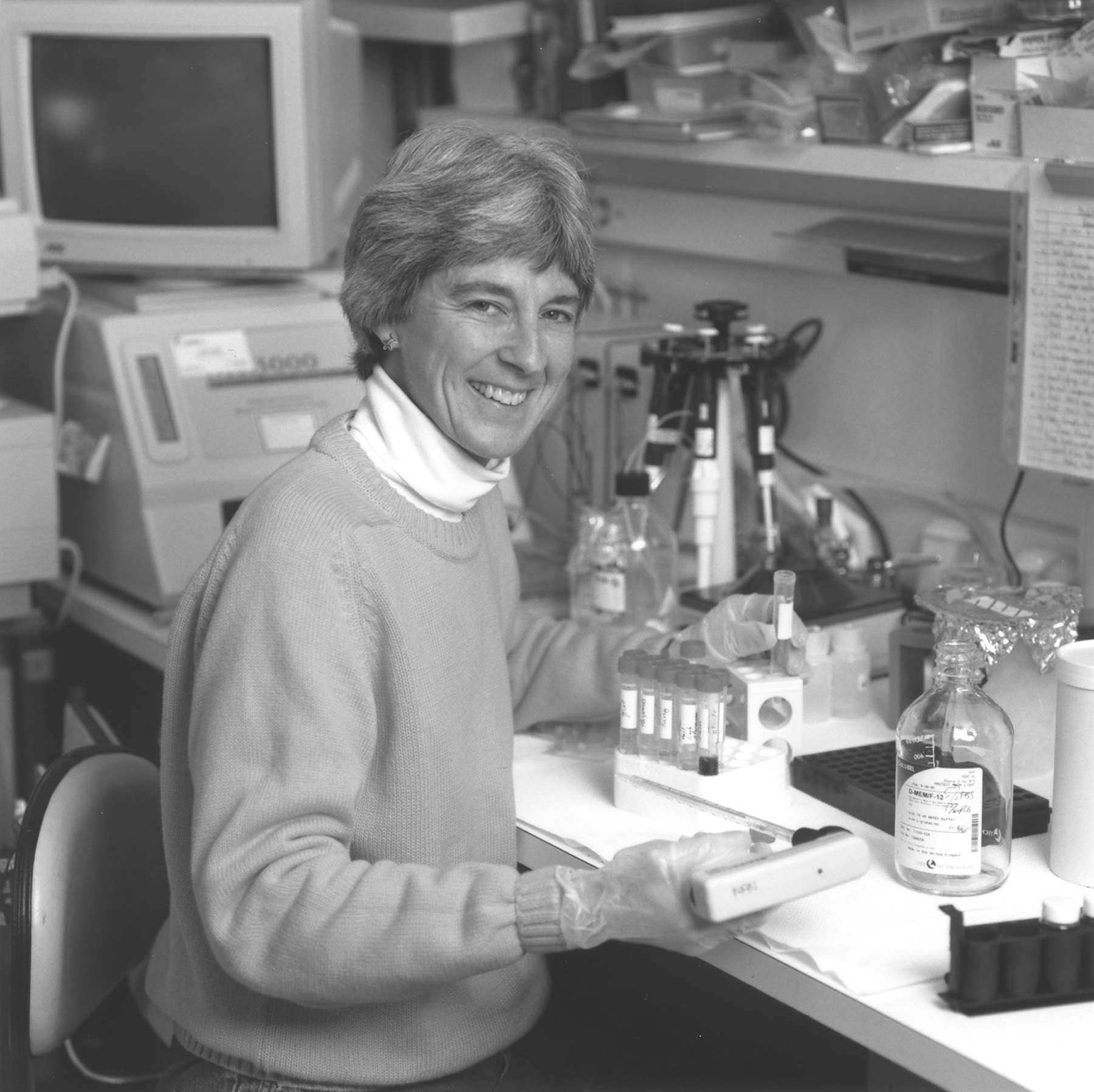
- Born: April 3, 1942; Pittsburgh, Pennsylvania
- Died: May 26, 2006 (aged 64); Bethesda, Maryland
- Education: Oberlin College (1964); University of Wisconsin-Madison (Ph.D., 1968)
- Known for: TGF-β
- Scientific career
- Fields: Biochemistry; Cancer research
- Workplaces: National Cancer Institute

Anita Bauer Roberts (April 3, 1942 – May 26, 2006) was an American molecular biologist who made pioneering observations of a protein, TGF-β, that is critical in healing wounds and bone fractures and that has a dual role in blocking or stimulating cancers.

She is ranked as one of the top fifty most cited biological scientists in the world.

== Formative years ==
Roberts was born on April 3, 1942, in Pittsburgh, Pennsylvania, where she grew up. In 1964, she graduated with her bachelor's degree in chemistry from Oberlin College. She earned her PhD in biochemistry from the University of Wisconsin–Madison in 1968, working on retinoid metabolism under Hector DeLuca.

She worked as a postdoctoral fellow at Harvard University, a staff chemist at Aerospace Research Applications Center, and an instructor in chemistry at Indiana University Bloomington.

== Career ==
In 1976, Roberts joined the National Cancer Institute, which is part of the National Institutes of Health in Bethesda, Maryland. From 1995 to 2004, she served as Chief of the institute's Laboratory of Cell Regulation and Carcinogenesis, and continued her research there until her death in 2006.

During the early 1980s, Roberts and her colleagues began to experiment with the protein transforming growth factor beta, commonly referred to as TGF-β.

Roberts isolated the protein from bovine kidney tissue and compared her results with TGF-β taken from human blood platelets and placental tissue. Institute researchers then began a series of experiments to determine the protein's characteristics. They discovered that it helps play a central role in signaling other growth factors in the body to heal wounds and fractures speedily.

TGF-β was later shown to have additional effects, including regulation of the heartbeat and the response of the eye to aging. In her continuing research, Roberts and others found that TGF-β inhibits the growth of some cancers while stimulating growth in advanced cancers, including cancers of the breast and lung.

Roberts was a former president of the Wound Healing Society In 2005, she was elected to the American Academy of Arts and Sciences.

Roberts herself was diagnosed with stage IV gastric cancer in March 2004. She received a degree of fame in the cancer community for her blog, detailing her daily struggles with the disease.

== Awards and recognition ==
Roberts was the recipient of several awards for her contributions to the field of science. These include: the Leopold Griffuel Prize (2005), FASEB Excellence in Science Award (2005), and Komen Brinker Award for Scientific Distinction (2005). A lecture series is named for her.

As of 2005, she was the 49th most-cited scientist and the third most-cited among all women scientists.
