= TNF inhibitor =

Class of immunosuppressive drug

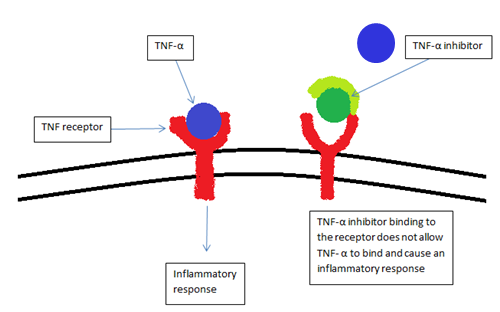
The function of TNF-α and TNF- α inhibitor

A TNF inhibitor is a pharmaceutical drug that suppresses the physiologic response to tumor necrosis factor (TNF), which is part of the inflammatory response. TNF is involved in autoimmune and immune-mediated disorders such as rheumatoid arthritis, ankylosing spondylitis, inflammatory bowel disease, psoriasis, hidradenitis suppurativa and refractory asthma, so TNF inhibitors may be used in their treatment. The important side effects of TNF inhibitors include lymphomas, infections (especially reactivation of latent tuberculosis), congestive heart failure, demyelinating disease, a lupus-like syndrome, induction of auto-antibodies, injection site reactions, and systemic side effects.

The global market for TNF inhibitors in 2008 was US$13.5 billion, in 2009 US$22 billion, and in 2024 US$44 billion.

== Examples ==
Inhibition of TNF effects can be achieved with a monoclonal antibody such as infliximab, adalimumab, certolizumab pegol, and golimumab, or with a circulating receptor fusion protein such as etanercept.

While most clinically useful TNF inhibitors are monoclonal antibodies, some are simple molecules such as xanthine derivatives (e.g. pentoxifylline) and bupropion.

Thalidomide and its derivatives lenalidomide and pomalidomide are also active against TNF.

Several 5-HT_{2A} agonist hallucinogens including (R)-DOI, TCB-2, LSD and LA-SS-Az have unexpectedly also been found to act as potent inhibitors of TNF, with DOI being the most active, showing TNF inhibition in the picomolar range, an order of magnitude more potent than its action as a hallucinogen. Similarly, many sigma-1 agonist psychoactive drugs including dextromethorphan, fluoxetine, and cocaine have also been found to inhibit TNF to varying degrees.

== Medical uses ==
=== Rheumatoid arthritis ===
The role of TNF as a key player in the development of rheumatoid arthritis was originally demonstrated by Greek biologist George Kollias and colleagues in proof of principle studies in transgenic animal models.

TNF levels have been shown to be raised in both the synovial fluid and synovium of patients with rheumatoid arthritis. This leads to local inflammation through the signalling of synovial cells to produce metalloproteinases and collagenase.

Clinical application of anti-TNF drugs in rheumatoid arthritis was demonstrated by Marc Feldmann and Ravinder N. Maini, who won the 2003 Lasker Award for their work. Anti-TNF compounds help eliminate abnormal B cell activity.

Therapy which combines certain anti-TNF agents such as etanercept with DMARDs such as methotrexate has been shown to be more effective at restoring quality of life to sufferers of rheumatoid arthritis than using either drug alone.

=== Skin disease ===
Clinical trials regarding the effectiveness of these drugs on hidradenitis suppurativa are ongoing.

The National Institute of Clinical Excellence (NICE) has issued guidelines for the treatment of severe psoriasis using the anti-TNF drugs etanercept and adalimumab as well as the anti-IL12/23 biological treatment ustekinumab. In cases where more conventional systemic treatments such as psoralen combined with ultraviolet A treatment (PUVA), methotrexate, and ciclosporin have failed or can not be tolerated, these newer biological agents may be prescribed. Infliximab may be used to treat severe plaque psoriasis if aforementioned treatments fail or can not be tolerated.

=== Gastrointestinal disease ===
In 2010 The National Institute of Clinical Excellence (NICE) in the UK issued guidelines for the treatment of severe Crohn's Disease with infliximab and adalimumab.

=== Cancer ===
Anti-TNF therapy has shown only modest effects in cancer therapy. Treatment of renal cell carcinoma with infliximab resulted in prolonged disease stabilization in certain patients. Etanercept was tested for treating patients with breast cancer and ovarian cancer showing prolonged disease stabilization in certain patients via downregulation of IL-6 and CCL2. On the other hand, adding infliximab or etanercept to gemcitabine for treating patients with advanced pancreatic cancer was not associated with differences in efficacy when compared with placebo.

== Side effects ==
=== Cancer ===
The U.S. Food and Drug Administration continues to receive reports of a rare cancer of white blood cells (known as hepatosplenic T-cell lymphoma or HSTCL), primarily in adolescents and young adults being treated for Crohn's disease and ulcerative colitis with TNF blockers, as well as with azathioprine, and/or mercaptopurine.

=== Opportunistic infections ===
TNF inhibitors put patients at increased risk of certain opportunistic infections. The FDA has warned about the risk of infection from two bacterial pathogens, Legionella and Listeria. People taking TNF blockers are at increased risk for developing serious infections that may lead to hospitalization or death due to certain bacterial, mycobacterial, fungal, viral, and parasitic (e.g., Leishmania) opportunistic pathogens.

==== Tuberculosis ====
In patients with latent Mycobacterium tuberculosis infection, active tuberculosis (TB) may develop soon after the initiation of treatment with infliximab. Before prescribing a TNF inhibitor, physicians should screen patients for latent tuberculosis. The anti-TNF monoclonal antibody biologics infliximab, golimumab, certolizumab and adalimumab, and the fusion protein etanercept, which are all currently approved by the FDA for human use, have warnings which state that patients should be evaluated for latent TB infection, and if it is detected, preventive treatment should be initiated prior to starting therapy with these medications.

==== Fungal infections ====
The FDA issued a warning on September 4, 2008, that patients on TNF inhibitors are at increased risk of opportunistic fungal infections such as pulmonary and disseminated histoplasmosis, coccidioidomycosis, and blastomycosis. They encourage clinicians to consider empiric antifungal therapy in certain circumstances to all patients at risk until the pathogen is identified. A recent review showed that anti-TNFα agents associate with increased infection risks for both endemic and opportunistic invasive fungal infections, particularly when given late in the overall course of treatment of the underlying disease, and in young patients receiving concomitant cytotoxic or augmented immunosuppressive therapy.

=== Multiple sclerosis and demyelinating disorders ===
In 1999 a randomized control trial was conducted testing a TNF-alpha inhibitor prototype, Lenercept, for the treatment of multiple sclerosis (MS). However, the patients in the study who received the drug had significantly more exacerbations and earlier exacerbations of their disease than those who did not.

Case reports have also come out suggesting the possibility that anti-TNF-alpha agents not only may worsen, but may cause new-onset Multiple Sclerosis or other demyelinating disorders in some patients. A 2018 case report described an Italian man with plaque psoriasis who developed MS after starting entanercept. Their literature review at that time identified 34 other cases of demyelinating disease developing after the initiation of an anti-TNF drug. Thus, anti-TNF-alpha drugs are contraindicated in patients with MS, and the American Academy of Dermatology recommends avoiding their use in those with a first degree relative with MS.

Several other monoclonal antibodies like adalimumab, pembrolizumab, nivolumab, and infliximab have been reported to trigger MS as an adverse event.

The risk of anti-TNF-associated demyelination is not associated with genetic variants of multiple sclerosis. In some studies, there were clinical differences to multiple sclerosis as 70% of the patients with anti-TNF-induced demyelination. The symptoms of demyelination do not resolve with corticosteroids, intravenous immunoglobulin or plasma exchange, and is not clear whether MS therapies are effective in anti-TNF-induced demyelination.

=== Paradoxical psoriasis ===
Despite their good safety profile, one of the reported side effects of TNF-α inhibitors is the occurrence of paradoxical psoriasis; defined as the development of psoriatic lesions or as an exacerbation of pre-existent lesions, in patients with or without a prior history of psoriasis, while undergoing treatment with TNF-α inhibitors, such as infliximab, adalimumab, and etanercept for their underlying inflammatory disease. The first case of paradoxical psoriasis induced by TNF-α inhibitors was reported in a patient with inflammatory bowel disease. Since then, an increasing number of cases have been reported in IBD cohorts and in patients suffering from other chronic immune-mediated inflammatory diseases such as rheumatoid arthritis. This increase is positively correlated with the increasing use of TNF-α inhibitors. The rates of paradoxical psoriasis reported across observational studies range from 2% to 5%, with higher rates observed in female patients. The time to onset from induction can range anywhere from a few days to a few months. The most common clinical presentations being pustular psoriasis, plaque psoriasis and guttate psoriasis, with nail and scalp involvement. Some patients may experience more than one type of lesion and/or have lesions across multiple locations.

== Anti-TNF agents in nature ==
TNF or its effects are inhibited by several natural compounds, including curcumin (a compound present in turmeric), and catechins (in green tea). Cannabidiol and Echinacea purpurea also seem to have anti-inflammatory properties through inhibition of TNF-α production, although this effect may be mediated through cannabinoid CB_{1} or CB_{2} receptor-independent effects.

5-HT_{2A} receptor agonists as well as sigma-1 receptor agonists have also been shown to have potent inhibitory effects on TNF-α, including psilocybin found in many species of mushrooms and DMT found in a wide variety of plants.

Thymoquinone, a compound found in the flower Nigella sativa, has been studied for possible TNF-α inhibition and related benefits for autoimmune disorder treatment.

== History ==
Early experiments associated TNF with the pathogenesis of bacterial sepsis. Thus, the first preclinical studies using polyclonal antibodies against TNF-alpha were performed in animal models of sepsis in 1985 and showed that anti-TNF antibodies protected mice from sepsis. However, subsequent clinical trials in patients with sepsis showed no significant benefit. It wasn't until 1991 that studies in a transgenic mouse model of overexpressed human TNF provided the pre-clinical rationale for a causal role of TNF in the development of polyarthritis and that anti-TNF treatments could be effective against human arthritides. This was later confirmed in clinical trials and led to the development of the first biological therapies for rheumatoid arthritis.
