= Vendryes =

Vendryes is a surname. Notable people with the surname include:

- Georges Vendryes (1920–2014), French physicist
- Joseph Vendryes (1875–1960), French Celtic linguist
- Margaret Rose Vendryes (1955–2022), American visual artist, curator, and art historian
- Jason Vendryes, American actor known for roles in Beyond the Gates, Ruthless, and Queen of the South
