= Rahima Banu =

Last known person naturally infected with Variola major smallpox

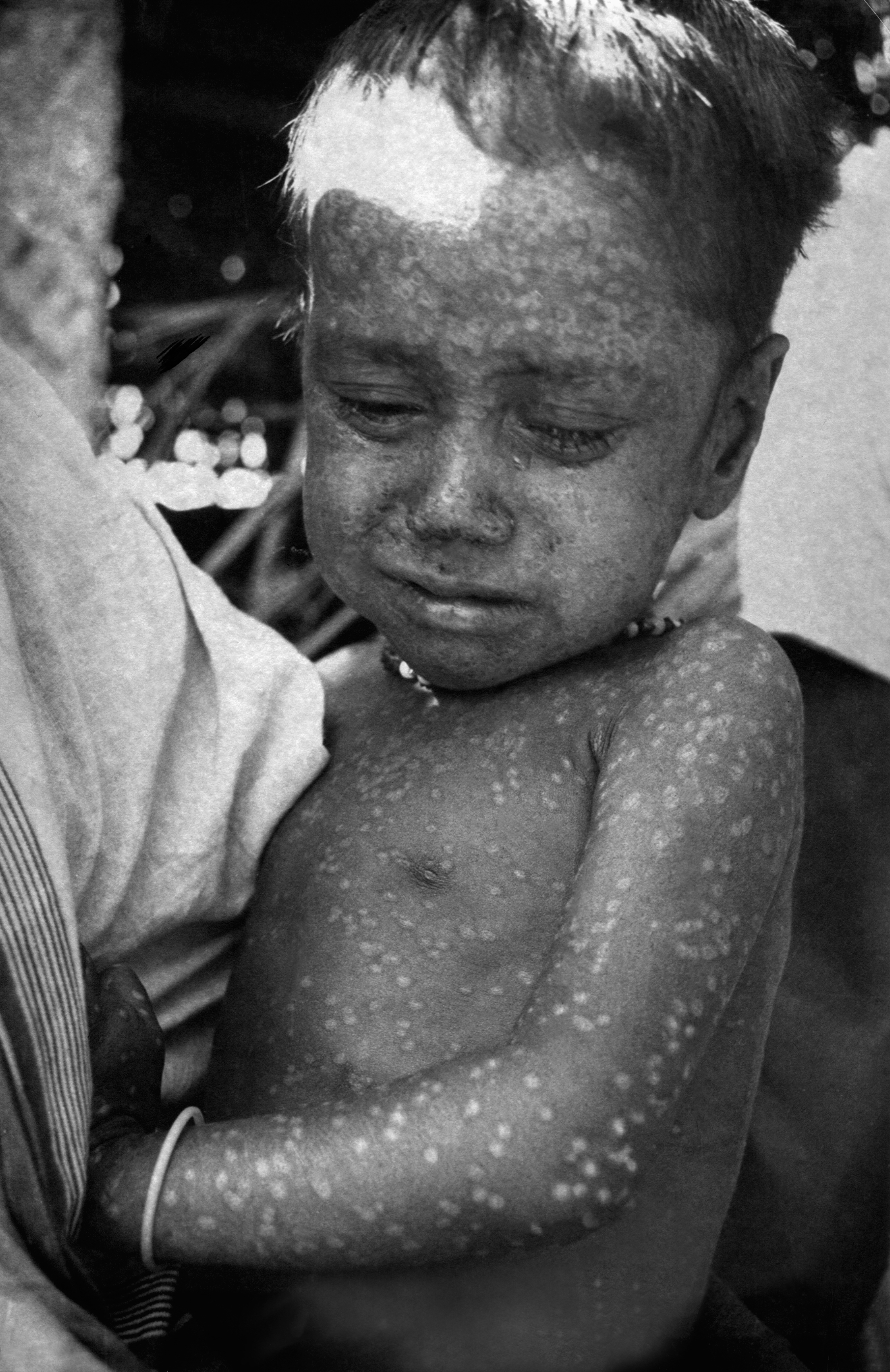
- Banu in 1975, displaying a smallpox-induced maculopapular rash
- Born: Rahima Banu Begum; 16 October 1972 (age 54)

Rahima Banu Begum (Bengali: রহিমা বানু বেগম; born 16 October 1972) is the last known person to have been infected with naturally occurring Variola major smallpox, the more deadly variety of the disease.

== Biography ==
=== Smallpox case ===
Rahima Banu's case of smallpox at three years old was reported to the public health officials on 16 October 1975. Her family lived in the village of Kuralia on Bhola Island in the Bangladeshi district of Barisal. Her case was reported to the local Smallpox Eradication Program team by an eight-year-old girl, Bilkisunnessa, who was paid 250 taka. Information on the case was forwarded via telegram to Donald Henderson, who led the World Health Organization's (WHO) campaign to eradicate the disease.

Following care provided by the WHO, Banu was declared cured on 24 November 1975. Scabs of the virus from her body were transferred to the US Centers for Disease Control and Prevention (CDC) office in Atlanta, where they are currently stored along with hundreds of other samples. Bhola Island remained under disease surveillance for ring vaccination of those with potential contact to her family. Her smallpox sample is formally known as "Bangladesh 1975" and informally described as the "Rahima strain".

=== Later life ===
Aside from her work as a housewife, Banu generated income for her family by posing for photos. In a 2009 interview, Banu lamented discrimination against her and her four children over health misinformation. After marrying a farmer at age 18, she sustained harassment from her in-laws over her widespread association with infectious disease. The WHO provided her family with a farm plot, but recent cyclones and rising sea levels have eroded the coastline and excessively salinated the soil. Thus, Banu's husband, Rafiqul Islam has shifted to pedaling a rickshaw to provide for the family.

In 2023, Banu criticized media depictions of her case as a public health success because her family's poverty has limited its access to safe housing, quality health care, and education for their children. Still, she expressed pride at contributing to the eradication of smallpox.

== See also ==
- Ali Maow Maalin, last person infected with naturally occurring Variola minor smallpox and last case of smallpox in general
- Janet Parker, last known person to die from smallpox
