= Yutaka Takahasi =

Japanese engineer (1927–2021)

Yutaka Takahasi (高橋 裕, Takahashi Yutaka, July 28, 1927 – May 26, 2021) was a Japanese engineer notable for his work on river basin management and reduction of water-related disasters.

Takahasi received the 2015 Japan Prize "for the contribution to development of innovative concept on river basin management and reduction of water-related disasters."

His work showed that many previous 'river improvements' resulted in increase in flood discharges, with his recommendations changing Japanese river management policies from the 1980s onward.

== Early life and education ==
Takahasi was the son of Goro Takahashi, an expert in citrus cultivation. He received his B.E. in engineering from the University of Tokyo in 1950, where he also graduated with a Ph.D. in engineering in 1964 while working as an associate professor.

== Career and research ==
Takahasi was appointed lecturer in the Faculty of Engineering at the University of Tokyo in 1955, and was promoted to associate professor in 1961, and full professor in 1968. He became professor emeritus in 1988. He was also professor in the Faculty of Engineering at Shibaura Institute of Technology from 1987 to 1998.

== Death ==
Yutaka Takahasi died on May 26, 2021, at the age of 93.

== Awards ==
- 1978 Nepal Suprabal Gorakha Dakshin Bafu
- 1981 L’Ordre des Palmes Academiques, Chevalier (France)
- 1987 National Land Agency Achievement Award for Water Resources
- 1994 Meijimura Award
- 1998 JSCE (Japan Society of Civil Engineers) Achievement Award
- 2000 IWRA (International Water Resources Association) Crystal Drop Award
- 2007 The Order of the Sacred Treasure, second class
- 2011 JAGH (Japanese Association of Groundwater Hydrology) Academic Award
- 2015 Japan Prize
- 2016 Asian Scientist 100, Asian Scientist
