= John J. Wild =

English-born American physician

- Born: August 11, 1914; Kent, England
- Died: September 18, 2009 (aged 95); Edina, Minnesota, U.S.
- Resting place: Lakewood Cemetery
- Education: University of Cambridge
- Awards: Japan Prize
- Scientific career
- Fields: Medicine

John Julian Cuttance Wild (August 11, 1914 – September 18, 2009) was an English-born American physician who was part of the first group to use ultrasound for body imaging, most notably for diagnosing cancer. Modern ultrasonic diagnostic medical scans are descendants of the equipment Wild and his colleagues developed in the 1950s. He has been described as the "father of medical ultrasound".

== Early life and education ==
Wild was born in Kent, England. He attended Merchant Taylors' School in the City of London and took out his first patent at the age of 14, for a device to distribute hot and cold water evenly when filling a bathtub. At the University of Cambridge, he studied the Natural Sciences Tripos, receiving a Bachelor of Arts degree in 1936, followed by a Master of Arts in 1940 and became a Doctor of Medicine in 1942. He was elected as a member of the Royal Society of Medicine in 1944 and joined the Royal Army Medical Corps that same year, leaving in 1945 with the rank of major. There he spent his time treating American and British soldiers for venereal diseases.

== Ultrasound ==
Wild emigrated to the United States in 1946, taking a position at the University of Minnesota. After starting at the school's department of surgery, he shifted to the electrical engineering department in 1950. As a surgeon during World War II he had seen many patients who had suffered bowel failure experienced because of bomb explosions from German V-1 flying bombs and had developed a technique called the "Wild tube" to deal with the problem. After seeing patients in the U.S. with similar conditions, Wild conceived the idea of using ultrasound as a noninvasive means to determine the level of injuries suffered in the intestines of patients, with the sound bouncing back from the tissue identifying the thickness and resiliency of that portion of the intestine. He had developed the technique after having heard of high-frequency sounds being used as a means to identify cracks in tank armor. While the early machines operated at too low a resolution for the purpose of scanning the intestines, by 1951 he and Dr. John Reid gained access to equipment that operated at the 15 MHz range, providing the detail needed to scan internally and to distinguish between healthy and cancerous tissue. Wild and his team were able to take ultrasound scans of breast tissue that could be used as a noninvasive means to identify and diagnose tumors. Together with Reid, Wild developed tools for scanning rectal and vaginal tissues.

Their work was published in the journal The Lancet in March 1951 and in Science in March 1952. Wild and Reid stated that they planned the "immediate application of echography to the detection of tumors in accessible sites in the living intact human organism" through the process of "record[ing] soft tissue structure by tracing the information obtained from a sound beam sweeping through the tissues onto a fluorescent television screen". They were credited in Diagnosis of Diseases of the Breast as "the first to develop equipment specifically designed for breast scanning", as well as "the first to differentiate between cystic and solid masses in the breast by means of ultrasonography".

Wild earned the 1991 Japan Prize, with a cash prize of 10 million yen (then approximately US$370,000), in recognition for his innovations in the field of ultrasound imaging.

== Death ==
A resident of St. Louis Park, Minnesota, Wild died at age 95 on September 18, 2009, at the N. C. Little Memorial Hospice in Edina, Minnesota, because of complications from a stroke. He was survived by his wife, Valerie, as well as by a daughter, two sons and three grandchildren. He was buried in Lakewood Cemetery.
