= Akira Fujishima =

Japanese chemist (born 1942)

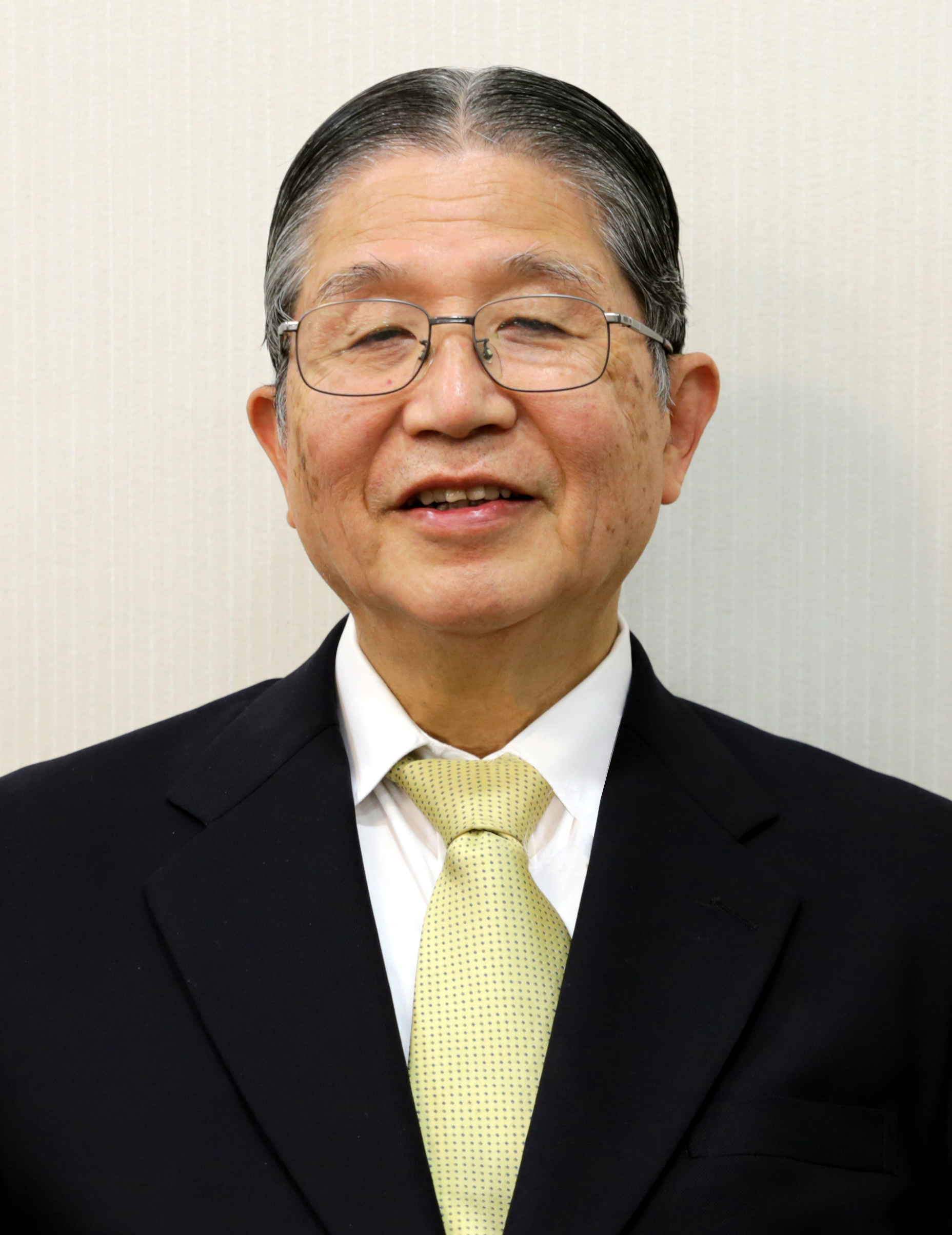
- Born: March 10, 1942 (age 84); Tokyo, Japan
- Education: Yokohama National University; University of Tokyo
- Known for: Discovery of photocatalytic and superhydrophilic properties of TiO_{2}
- Awards: Asahi Prize (1983); Japan Prize (2004); Japan Academy Prize (2004); Order of Culture (2017)
- Scientific career
- Fields: Photoelectrochemistry; TiO_{2} Photocatalysis; Photofunctional Materials; Diamond Electrochemistry
- Doctoral advisor: Ken'ichi Honda

Akira Fujishima (藤嶋 昭, Fujishima Akira; born March 10, 1942) is a Japanese chemist and president of Tokyo University of Science. He is known for significant contributions to the discovery and research of photocatalytic and superhydrophilic properties of titanium dioxide (TiO_{2}), which is also known as the Honda-Fujishima effect.

== Career and research ==
In 1966, he earned his B.A. (Engineering) at the Faculty of Engineering, Yokohama National University, and in 1971 his Ph.D. (Engineering) at the Graduate School of Engineering, the University of Tokyo.

In 1967, while working on his Ph.D. under the supervision of professor Kenichi Honda (本多 健一), he discovered the phenomenon of photocatalytic water decomposition (water photolysis) when he exposed a titanium dioxide electrode to strong light, later called the Honda-Fujishima effect. The discovery of self-cleaning properties of titanium dioxide by the group under his supervision initiated a revolution in the ceramic, glass, and other industries (e.g., self-cleaning glass).

On completing his Ph.D. in 1971 he became assistant professor at Kanagawa University but returned to the University of Tokyo in 1975 as assistant professor in the Department of Applied Chemistry. He was promoted to associate professor in 1978 and professor in 1986 within the same department. He became professor emeritus in 2003 and special university professor emeritus in 2005.

In 1989, he was appointed executive director of the Chemical Society of Japan. In 1998 he became chief of the optical science group at Kanagawa Academy of Science and Technology Research, and president of the Japanese Photochemistry Association. In 1999 he was founder editor-in-chief of the editorial panel of the Journal of Photochemistry and Photobiology C: Photochemistry Reviews. In 2001, he was nominated vice president of the Chemical Society of Japan, becoming its president in 2006.

In 2002, he was research supervisor for the development of advanced nanostructured materials for energy conversion and storage at the Japan Science and Technology Agency (JST). In 2003 he became president of the Electrochemical Society of Japan and chairman of the Kanagawa Academy of Science and Technology. In 2010, Fujishima became the ninth president of Tokyo University of Science.

== Recognition ==
Akira Fujishima has been the recipient of many prestigious awards and honours.

In 1983, he was awarded the Asahi Prize from the Asahi Shimbun. He received the Award for Research Excellence from the Electrochemical Society of Japan in 1987.

In 1998, he received the Inoue Harushige Award for technical innovation from the Research Development Corporation of Japan and the Innovations in Real Materials Award.

In 1999, he received the Award of the Electrochemical Society of Japan 1999 and in the following year, 2000, the Chemical Society of Japan Award

In 2003, he was the recipient of the Heinz Gerischer Award of the European Section of The Electrochemical Society and Japan's Medal with Purple Ribbon. The following year he was further recognised in his own country when in 2004 he received both the Japan Prize and the Japan Academy Prize

In 2006, he received the National Commendation for Invention Award and the Kanagawa Culture Award.

In 2012, he received the Laurea Honoris Causa in chemistry of the environment from the University of Turin.

In 2017, he received the Order of Culture from the Emperor of Japan.
