= Ali Maow Maalin =

Last naturally acquired case of smallpox (1954–2013)

- Maalin in 1977, while infected with smallpox
- Born: Ali Maow Maalin; 1954; Merca, Trust Territory of Somaliland
- Died: 22 July 2013 (aged 58–59); Merca, Somalia
- Occupation: Vaccine advocate
- Known for: Last person in history recorded to be infected with naturally occurring smallpox

Ali Maow Maalin (Somali: Cali Macow Macallin; also Mao Moallim and Mao' Mo'allim; 1954 – 22 July 2013) was a Somali hospital cook and health worker from Merca who is the last person known to have been infected with naturally occurring Variola minor smallpox. The disease was diagnosed in October 1977 and Maalin made a full recovery. Although he had many contacts, none of them developed the disease, and an aggressive containment campaign was successful in preventing an outbreak. Smallpox was declared to have been eradicated globally by the World Health Organization (WHO) two years later. Maalin was subsequently involved in the successful poliomyelitis eradication campaign in Somalia, and he died of malaria while carrying out polio vaccinations after the re-emergence of the poliovirus in 2013.

== Early life ==
Merca (Marka) is immediately southwest of the capital, Mogadishu.

Ali Maow Maalin was born in 1954 in the port town of Merca, in southern Somalia. He worked as a hospital cook, as well as an occasional vaccinator for a WHO smallpox eradication team. He had not been successfully vaccinated, even though smallpox vaccination was obligatory for hospital employees.

According to CDC epidemiologist Jason Weisfeld, one of the people who led the later containment effort in Merca, Maalin had received the smallpox vaccine but it had failed to take effect, and he had not been protected. Other sources state that he had not been vaccinated. It was later revealed in an interview in 2007, Maalin said that he had not been vaccinated, explaining: "I was scared of being vaccinated then. It looked like the shot hurt."

== Maalin's case ==
In August 1977, an outbreak developed in a Somali nomadic group of twenty families; eight children developed symptoms in August to October. On 12 October 1977, two children with smallpox symptoms were discovered at an encampment near the small inland settlement of Kurtunawarey, around 90 km (60 miles) from Merca. Local officials drove the children to Merca, where there was a nearby isolation camp. Maalin, then aged 23, served as a guide to the party taking them in a closed Land Cruiser from the hospital where he worked either to the home of a surveillance supervisor or directly to the isolation camp. He is believed to have been infected during the journey, which lasted no more than 5–15 minutes. One of the children, a six-year-old girl named Habiba Nur Ali, died two days later. She was the last person to die from naturally acquired smallpox. The outbreak among the nomadic group was successfully contained by WHO workers by 18 October, but, critically, investigators failed to identify Maalin as a contact.

On 22 October, Maalin fell ill with fever and headache, and received malaria treatment in hospital. After four days a rash appeared. Perhaps working on the assumption that he had been successfully vaccinated against smallpox, Maalin was then believed to have chickenpox and was discharged from hospital. Over the next few days, his symptoms developed to indicate smallpox as the cause. Not wishing to be put into isolation, Maalin failed to report himself. On 30 October, a nurse colleague reported him, possibly for the reward of 200 Somali shillings (around $35), and Maalin was transferred to the isolation camp. An infection of the Variola minor strain of smallpox was diagnosed, based on his symptoms and later confirmed by laboratory tests. The date of diagnosis is sometimes stated as 26 October 1977. Maalin did not experience complications, and subsequently recovered fully and was discharged in late November.

Donald Henderson, who directed the WHO eradication programme from 1967 until 1976, describes Maalin's case as "a classic one in depicting omissions and mistakes in program operations." Maalin, described by Henderson as "a popular man," had been visited by many relatives and friends during his illness before he entered isolation. While hospitalised with fever, he had walked freely around the hospital, interacting with multiple patients.

== Containing the potential outbreak ==
Multiple measures were used to contain the potential outbreak in the town of Merca. The response was coordinated by Weisfeld and Karl Markvart. Maalin's contacts were all traced by the WHO eradication team. A total of 161 contacts were identified, 41 of whom had not been vaccinated. There were 91 people who had been in face-to-face contact with Maalin, 12 of whom were unvaccinated. Some of his contacts lived up to 120 km (75 miles) outside the town. All contacts were kept under surveillance for six weeks. His face-to-face contacts and their families were vaccinated, but none showed any sign of having been infected. Merca Hospital was closed to new patients, all its medical staff were vaccinated and existing patients were quarantined in situ. The residents of the fifty houses neighbouring Maalin's lodgings were vaccinated, and vaccinations were later extended to the ward of the town in which Maalin lived. House-to-house searches throughout the entire town looked for cases. Police checkpoints on all exits to the town, including footpaths, were established to vaccinate anyone passing who had not been recently immunised. A total of 54,777 people were vaccinated in the two weeks following Maalin's isolation. The response later broadened, with monthly house-to-house searches across the region widening to a search throughout Somalia, completed in December 1977.

The containment efforts proved effective and, on 17 April 1978, WHO's Nairobi office sent a telegram stating: "Search complete. No cases discovered. Ali Maow Maalin is the world's last known smallpox case." Although there was one further smallpox outbreak in 1978 acquired from a laboratory in Birmingham, UK, Maalin remains the last case of naturally acquired smallpox in the world. On 26 October 1979, two years after the day when Maalin's rash appeared, WHO declared that smallpox had been eradicated globally.

== Later life and involvement in polio eradication campaign ==
Maalin remained in the Merca area, where he was employed in a range of roles. In the mid-1990s, he was selling medicines in a nearby small town. Maalin was among the 10,000 volunteers who participated in the effort to eradicate poliomyelitis from Somalia, which succeeded in 2008. He explained his motivation for volunteering: "Somalia was the last country with smallpox. I wanted to help ensure that we would not be the last place with polio too."

Maalin worked for WHO as a local coordinator with responsibility for social mobilisation, and spent several years travelling across Somalia, vaccinating children and educating communities. The Boston Globe described him as one of the "most valuable" local coordinators for WHO. He encouraged people to be vaccinated by sharing his experiences with smallpox: "Now when I meet parents who refuse to give their children the polio vaccine, I tell them my story. I tell them how important these vaccines are. I tell them not to do something foolish like me." He continued to work as a regional coordinator for the vaccination drive, and was hailed as one of the "true heroes" of the campaign.

A younger sister of Maalin died due to measles, inspiring Maalin to train as a health worker and assist in providing measles immunisations to children.

After the 2013 reintroduction of poliovirus into Somalia, Maalin was again carrying out vaccinations in the Merca district when he developed a fever, and died days later, on 22 July 2013, of malaria.

== Smallpox eradication in Africa ==
Smallpox was an infectious disease caused by two strains of virus, Variola major and V. minor. V. minor was the rarer of the two strains, and causes a much less severe disease (sometimes called alastrim), with a fatality rate of around 1%. No treatment is available, and the only protection is vaccination. The virus is usually transmitted by prolonged face-to-face contact with a person showing symptoms. The incubation period averages 12–14 days. One of the most feared diseases of human history, smallpox was still causing an estimated 2 million deaths every year as late as 1967.

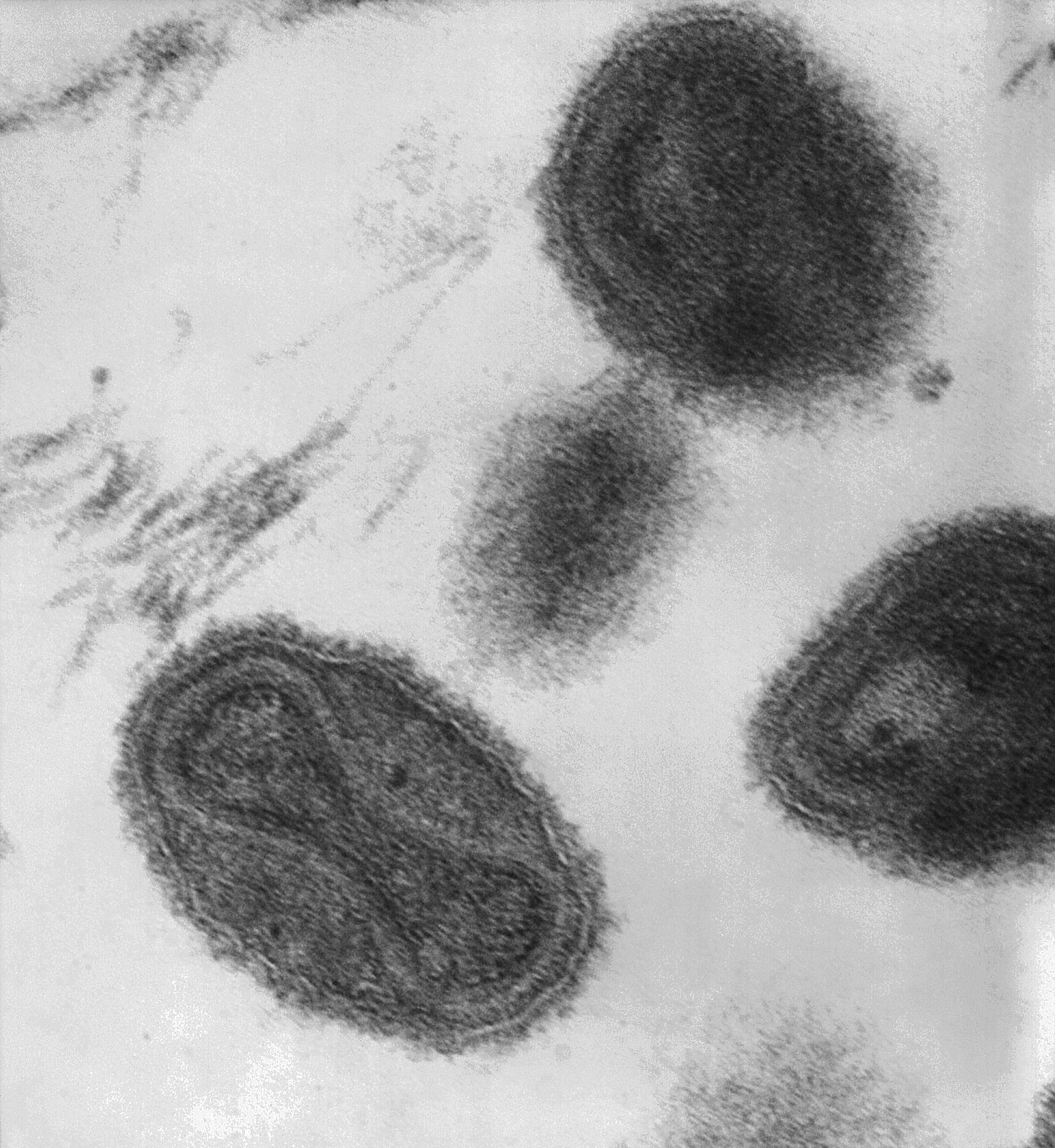
Smallpox virus

The global effort to eradicate smallpox from endemic areas such as Africa began in 1959 with a mass vaccination campaign. This approach met with little success, and a more effective targeted approach was developed in the late 1960s. This involved active surveillance by case hunting, combined with rapid containment of infection in areas reporting outbreaks by intensive vaccination. The majority of African countries were free from smallpox by 1972. By the end of 1975, the virus had been eradicated worldwide except in Ethiopia and Somalia in the Horn of Africa, and their neighbour Kenya. The nomadic people of the Ogaden Desert retained endemic smallpox with an unusually mild form of the disease, which facilitated persistence in the population. From 1975, WHO efforts were concentrated on this region. Ethiopia saw its last case in August 1976 and Kenya in February 1977.

Somalia proved particularly challenging because much of its population of 3.5 million was nomadic. A mass vaccination campaign in the country in 1969 had failed because many nomadic people in the region had cultural objections to vaccination, and either refused or avoided it. Elimination efforts relied on an intensive reporting system. A severe drought in 1975 exacerbated the difficulties by increasing movement across the border with Ethiopia, and frequent outbreaks continued. In March 1977, surveillance efforts found over 3000 cases in the south of the country. The Somali government declared a state of emergency and successfully appealed to the United Nations for assistance. By June, when the outbreak peaked, 3,000 Somali health workers and 23 international advisers were involved in the eradication efforts. Eradication work was hampered in July when the Ogaden War broke out, limiting access to the desert.

== See also ==
- Rahima Banu: The last person to contract smallpox from naturally occurring Variola major
- Janet Parker: The last person to die from smallpox, which occurred after she acquired the virus from a laboratory source in Birmingham, UK
