= Japan Prize =

Science and technology award

The Japan Prize
- Awarded for: original and outstanding achievements in science and technology that are recognized as having advanced the frontiers of knowledge and having served the cause of peace and prosperity for mankind
- Country: Japan
- Presented by: The Japan Prize Foundation
- First award: 1985
- Website: www.japanprize.jp

The Japan Prize (日本国際賞, Nihon-kokusai-shō; lit. "Japan International Prize") is awarded to individuals whose original and outstanding achievements in science and technology are recognized as having advanced the frontiers of knowledge and served the cause of peace and prosperity for mankind. As of 2026, the Japan Prize has been awarded to 116 people from more than thirteen countries.

The Japan Prize is presented by the Japan Prize Foundation, which selects internationally renowned scientists and engineers to be awarded the Prize in one of two areas: one from Physics, Chemistry, Informatics, and Engineering; and one from Life Science, Agriculture, Medicine, and Pharmacy. The corresponding fields for each area are determined in advance, and each year, two awards are presented. Laureates each receive a certificate of merit, a prize medal, and as of 2020, a prize of 100 million yen. Only living individuals are eligible for the award.

The prestigious prize presentation ceremony is held in the presence of the Emperor and the Empress of Japan. According to his book Dancing Naked in the Mind Field, Kary Mullis, 1993 Nobel Laureate in Chemistry, addressed Empress Michiko as sweetie when being awarded the prize in 1993 for the development of the polymerase chain reaction. The events are also attended by the Prime Minister, the Speaker of the House of Representatives, the President of the House of Councillors, the Chief Justice of the Supreme Court, and by government ministers and representatives from various fields and industries. The 2014 Japan Prize Presentation Ceremony was held on April 23 at the National Theatre in Tokyo.

At present the international prize is often considered one of the most prestigious awards in science and technology fields after the Nobel Prize. According to an article in the scientific journal Nature Immunology, the prize is one of the prestigious science awards that recognize immunology as well as Nobel Prize, Sweden (since 1901), Albert Lasker Basic Medical Research Award, USA (since 1946), Paul Ehrlich and Ludwig Darmstaedter Prize, Germany (since 1952), Canada Gairdner International Award, Canada (since 1959), Wolf Prize, Israel (since 1978), and Crafoord Prize, Sweden (since 1980).

== Background ==
In 1981, the Japanese government wished to establish a prestigious international award that would contribute to the advancement of science and technology, and private donations would form the foundation of the prize.

The Japanese Government issued the following cabinet endorsement on the establishment of the Japan Prize on October 28, 1983:

The official position of the Japanese Government is that the Japan Prize, to be bestowed by the Science and Technology Foundation of Japan (now known as the Japan Prize Foundation), will serve to deepen the understanding of the role played by science and technology in furthering world peace and prosperity, thereby making a vital contribution to the positive development of mankind. Based on this judgment, the government agencies concerned are urged to offer whatever cooperation necessary in all phases pertinent to this Prize.

The first Japan Prize Presentation Ceremony was held in April 1985.

== Laureates ==
Year	Name	Nationality	Citation
2026	Cynthia Dwork	United States	for her contribution to leading research for building an ethical digital society, including differential privacy and fairness.
2026	Shizuo Akira; Zhijian Chen	Japan; United States	for their discovery of the nucleic acid sensing mechanism by the innate immune system.
2025	Russell Dean Dupuis	United States	for his distinguished contributions to the Development of metalorganic chemical vapor deposition technology for compound semiconductor electronic and optoelectronic devices, and pioneering contribution to its large-scale commercialization.
2025	Carlos M. Duarte	Spain	for his contribution to our understanding of marine ecosystems in a changing Earth, especially through pioneering research on Blue Carbon.
2024	Brian Hoskins; John Michael Wallace	United Kingdom; United States	for the establishment of a scientific foundation for understanding and predicting extreme weather events.
2024	Ronald M. Evans	United States	for the discovery of the nuclear hormone receptor family and its application to drug development
2023	Masataka Nakazawa; Kazuo Hagimoto	Japan; Japan	for distinguished contributions to global long-distance, high-capacity optical fiber network through the development of semiconductor laser pumped optical amplifier.
2023	Gero Miesenböck; Karl Deisseroth	Austria; United States	for the development of methods that use genetically addressable light-sensitive membrane proteins to unravel neural circuit function.
2022	Katalin Karikó; Drew Weissman	Hungary; United States	for pioneering research contributing to the development of mRNA vaccines.
2022	Christopher Field	United States	for outstanding contributions to estimation of global biospheric productivity and climate change science using advanced formulas based on observation
2021	Martin A. Green	Australia	for development of high-efficiency silicon photovoltaic devices.
2021	Bert Vogelstein; Robert A. Weinberg	United States; United States	for their pioneering work in conceptualizing a multi-step model of carcinogenesis and its application and impact on improving cancer diagnosis and therapy.
2020	Robert G. Gallager	United States	for pioneering contribution to information and coding theory.
2020	Svante Pääbo	Sweden	for pioneering contributions to paleoanthropology through decoding ancient human genome sequences.
2019	Yoshio Okamoto	Japan	for leading contributions to precision synthesis of helical polymers and development of practical chiral materials for separating chiral drugs.
2019	Rattan Lal	India	for the sustainable soil management for global food security and mitigation of climate change.
2018	Akira Yoshino	Japan	for the development of lithium-ion batteries.
2018	Max Dale Cooper; Jacques Miller	United States; Australia	for the discovery of B and T lymphocyte lineages and its impact on understanding disease pathology and therapeutic development.
2017	Emmanuelle Charpentier; Jennifer Doudna	France; United States	for deciphering the molecular details of the type II bacterial immune system CRISPR (Clustered Regularly Interspaced Short Palindromic Repeats)-Cas and the creation of the CRISPR-Cas9 genome editing system, a truly revolutionary technique in genetic engineering, far more economical and faster than those previously available.
2017	Adi Shamir	Israel	for his significant contributions to the fields of cryptography and computer science.
2016	Hideo Hosono	Japan	for the creation of unconventional inorganic materials with novel electronic functions based on nano-structure engineering.
2016	Steven D. Tanksley	United States	for his contribution to modern crop breeding through research on development of molecular genetic analysis.
2015	Yutaka Takahasi (ja)	Japan	for the contribution to development of innovative concept on river basin management and reduction of water-related disasters.
2015	Theodore Friedmann; Alain Fischer	United States; France	for the proposal of the concept of gene therapy and its clinical applications.
2014	Yasuharu Suematsu	Japan	for pioneering research on semiconductor lasers for high-capacity long-distance optical fiber communication.
2014	C. David Allis	United States	for the discovery of histone modifications as fundamental regulators of gene expression.
2013	C. Grant Willson (de); Jean M. J. Fréchet	United States; United States	for development of chemically amplified resist polymer materials for innovative semiconductor manufacturing process.
2013	John Frederick Grassle	United States	for contribution to marine environmental conservation through research on ecology and biodiversity of deep-sea organisms.
2012	Janet Rowley; Brian Druker; Nicholas Lydon	United States; United States; United Kingdom	for the development of a new therapeutic drug targeting cancer-specific molecules.
2012	Masato Sagawa	Japan	for the developing the world's highest performing Nd-Fe-B type permanent magnet and contributing to energy conservation.
2011	Kenneth Thompson; Dennis Ritchie	United States; United States	for writing the Unix operating system.
2011	Tadamitsu Kishimoto; Toshio Hirano	Japan; Japan	for the discovery of interleukin-6.
2010	Shun-ichi Iwasaki	Japan	for contributions to high-density magnetic recording technology by the development of a perpendicular magnetic recording method.
2010	Peter Vitousek	United States	for contributions to solving global environmental issues based on the analysis of nitrogen and other substances’ cycles.
2009	Dennis L. Meadows	United States	for contributions in the area of "Transformation towards a sustainable society in harmony with nature".
2009	David E. Kuhl	United States	for contributions in the area of "Technological integration of medical science and engineering". Specifically, tomographic imaging in nuclear medicine.
2008	Vinton Gray Cerf; Robert E. Kahn	United States; United States	for the creation of network architecture and communication protocol for the Internet.
2008	Victor A. McKusick	United States	for the establishment of medical genetics and contributions to its development.
2007	Albert Fert; Peter Grünberg	France; Germany	for the discovery of Giant Magneto-Resistance (GMR) and its contribution to development of innovative spin-electronics devices.
2007	Peter Shaw Ashton	United Kingdom	for contributions to the conservation of tropical forest.
2006	John Houghton	United Kingdom	for pioneering research on atmospheric structure and composition based on his satellite observation technology and for promotion of international assessments of climate change.
2006	Akira Endo	Japan	for the discovery of the Statins and their development.
2005	Makoto Nagao	Japan	for pioneering contributions to Natural Language Processing and Intelligent Image Processing.
2005	Masatoshi Takeichi; Erkki Ruoslahti	Japan; United States	for fundamental contribution in elucidating the Molecular Mechanisms of Cell Adhesion.
2004	Kenichi Honda; Akira Fujishima	Japan; Japan	for pioneering work on photochemical catalysis and its application for the environment.
2004	Keith J. Sainsbury	New Zealand	for contributions to the understanding of shelf ecosystems and their sustainable utilization.
2004	John H. Lawton	United Kingdom	for observational, experimental and theoretical achievements for the scientific understanding and conservation of Biodiversity.
2003	Benoît Mandelbrot; James A. Yorke	France United States; United States	for the creation of universal concepts in complex systems - Chaos and Fractals.
2003	Seiji Ogawa	Japan	for the discovery of the principle for functional magnetic resonance imaging.
2002	Tim Berners-Lee	United Kingdom	for advancement of civilization through invention, implementation and deployment of the World Wide Web.
2002	Anne McLaren; Andrzej K. Tarkowski	United Kingdom; Poland	for pioneering work on mammalian embryonic development.
2001	John B. Goodenough	United States	for the discovery of environmentally benign electrode materials for high energy density rechargeable lithium batteries.
2001	Timothy R. Parsons	Canada	for the contributions to the development of Biological/Fisheries Oceanography and for conservation of fishery resources and marine environment.
2000	Ian L. McHarg	United States	for the establishment of an ecological City Planning Process and a proposal of a Land Use Evaluation System.
2000	Kimishige Ishizaka	Japan	for the discovery of Immunoglobulin E and mechanisms of IgE-mediated allergic reactions.
1999	W. Wesley Peterson	United States	for the establishment of coding theory for reliable digital communication, broadcasting and storage.
1999	Jack L. Strominger; Don C. Wiley	United States; United States	for the elucidation of the three dimensional structures of class I and class II human histocompatibility antigens and their bound peptides.
1998	Leo Esaki	Japan	for the creation and realization of the concept of man-made superlattice crystals which led to generation of new materials with useful applications.
1998	Jozef S. Schell; Marc C. E. Van Montagu	Belgium; Belgium	for the establishment of the theory and method of the production of transgenic plants.
1997	Takashi Sugimura; Bruce N. Ames	Japan; United States	for the contribution to establishment of fundamental concept on causes of cancer.
1997	Joseph F. Engelberger; Hiroyuki Yoshikawa (ja)	United States; Japan	for the establishment of the Robot Industry and Creation of a Techno-Global Paradigm.
1996	Charles K. Kao	United States United Kingdom	for pioneering research on wide-band, low-loss optical fiber communications.
1996	Masao Ito	Japan	for the elucidation of the functional principles and neural mechanisms of the cerebellum.
1995	Nick Holonyak Jr.	United States	for outstanding contributions to research and practical applications of light emitting diodes and lasers through pioneering achievements in the understanding of physical principles and in the process technology of intermetallic compound semiconductors.
1995	Edward F. Knipling	United States	for pioneering contributions in the development of Integrated Pest Management by the Sterile Insect Release Method and other biological approaches.
1994	William Hayward Pickering	New Zealand	for inspirational leadership in unmanned lunar and planetary exploration, and for pioneering achievements in the development of spacecraft and deep space communications.
1994	Arvid Carlsson	Sweden	for the discovery of dopamine as a neurotransmitter and clarification of its role in mental and motor functions and their disorders.
1993	Frank Press	United States	for the development of modern seismology and advancement of international cooperation in disaster science.
1993	Kary B. Mullis	United States	for the development of the polymerase chain reaction.
1992	Gerhard Ertl	Germany	for the contributions to the new development of the chemistry and physics of solid surfaces.
1992	Ernest John Christopher Polge	United Kingdom	for the discovery of a method of the cryopreservation of semen and embryos in farm animals.
1991	Jacques-Louis Lions	France	for the contributions to analysis and control of distributed systems, and to promotion of applied analysis.
1991	John Julian Wild	United States	for the development of ultrasound imaging in medicine.
1990	Marvin Minsky	United States	for the establishment of an academic field named Artificial Intelligence and the proposal of fundamental theories in that field.
1990	William Jason Morgan; Dan McKenzie; Xavier Le Pichon	United States; United Kingdom; France	for the initiation of the theory of plate tectonics and contributions to its development.
1989	Frank Sherwood Rowland	United States	for the studies on the mechanisms of stratospheric ozone depletion by chlorofluorocarbons.
1989	Elias James Corey	United States	for the pioneering contributions to the syntheses of prostaglandins and their related compounds which are of great therapeutic value.
1988	Georges Vendryes	France	for the establishment of fast breeder reactor technology.
1988	Donald Henderson; Isao Arita; Frank Fenner	United States; Japan; Australia	for the eradication of Smallpox.
1988	Luc Montagnier; Robert C. Gallo	France; United States	for the discovery of the AIDS-causing virus and development of diagnostic methods.
1987	Henry M. Beachell; Gurdev S. Khush	United States; India	for the development of the IR8 and IR36 strains for rice breeding strategies geared to the tropical and subtropical zones.
1987	Theodore H. Maiman	United States	for the realization of the world's first laser.
1986	David Turnbull	United States	for pioneering contributions to materials science with impact on new materials technology such as amorphous solids.
1986	Willem J. Kolff	United States	for research and development of artificial organs and their relevant technology.
1985	John R. Pierce	United States	for outstanding achievement in the field of electronics and communications technologies.
1985	Ephraim Katchalski-Katzir	Israel	for outstanding achievement in basic theory in the field of immobilized enzymes and their practical applications.

== See also ==
- List of general science and technology awards
