= Fukase Yōshun =

Japanese physician and vaccinologist

- 深瀬 洋春

Personal details
- Born: Fukase Sadayuki (深瀬 貞之); 1834 Hakodate, Matsumae Domain, Japan
- Died: December 23, 1905 (aged 70–71) Hakodate, Hokkaido, Japan

Fukase Yōshun (Japanese: 深瀬 洋春; 1834–1905) was a Japanese physician and vaccinologist.

== Biography ==
Fukase Yōshun was born in Hakodate as the eldest son of Fukase Kōsai Kazumoto (深瀬 鴻斉 一甫), a medical expert originally from the Yonezawa Domain in Dewa Province who moved to Hakodate in order to open a medical practice. Fukase Yōshun's brother, Fukase Kōdō (深瀬 鴻堂), became the second director of the Hakodate Medical Center (箱館医学所, Hakodate igakujo) founded by Kurimoto Jō'un.

Fukase traveled to Edo to study Western medicine with Satō Takanaka. At the Russian Consulate in Hakodate he studied with a physician named Zalessky (Залесский).

In 1857, alarmed by an epidemic of smallpox spreading rapidly among the Ainu, Abe Masahiro ordered a small team of physicians including Fukase and Kuwata Ryūsai to enter Ezo and carry out compulsory vaccination of the Ainu populace. The team prepared their vaccine from samples of plasma collected from smallpox victims (痘漿, tōshō). Fukase traveled to Karafuto and carried out the first known smallpox vaccinations there.

In his later years, Fukase returned to his hometown of Hakodate and served at the local medical outpost of the Kaitakushi. He died in 1905.

== See also ==
- Koyama Shisei
