= Theodore Friedmann =

American researcher

Theodore Friedmann (born June 16, 1935) is an American researcher most noted for his work in human gene therapy.

== Early life and education ==
He was born in Vienna. His family emigrated to the United States when he was a young child. Friedmann received his A.B in 1956 and M.D. in 1960 from the University of Pennsylvania. He received an M.A. from the University of Oxford in 1995, where he was the Newton-Abraham Visiting Professor in 1996.

== Career and research ==
After his MD, he worked at the Children's Hospital Medical Center, Boston, Massachusetts from 1960 to 1962, and the US Air Force 10th Tac. Hospital in Alconbury, England from 1962 to 1963. He then worked as a research fellow in colloid science at the University of Cambridge from 1963 to 1964 before returning to Boston, where he was also a teaching and research fellow at Harvard University. He worked at the National Institutes of Health from 1965 to 1968, and then joined the University of California, San Diego where he was assistant professor, promoted to associate professor in 1973 and professor in 1981.

He is a past president of the American Society for Gene Therapy (now the American Society of Gene and Cell Therapy).

He also served as the first chair of WADA's Gene Doping Expert Group, from its establishment in 2004 to 2019

He was awarded the Japan Prize in 2015 'for the proposal of the concept of gene therapy and its clinical applications.

== Awards ==
- The Award of Merit from National Institutes of Health (NIH) 2003
- Japan Prize 2015
- Distinguished Graduate Award, University of Pennsylvania, 2006
- Austrian Cross of Honour for Science and Art, 1996
- H.C. Jacobæus Prize of the Nordic Research Committee and Nordic Insulin Foundation, 1995

== Selected publications ==
- Friedmann, Theodore, and Richard Roblin. "Gene therapy for human genetic disease?." Science 175.4025 (1972): 949–955.
- Friedmann, Theodore. "Progress toward human gene therapy." Science 244.4910 (1989): 1275–1281.
