= Kenichi Honda =

Japanese chemist (1925–2011)

- Born: August 23, 1925
- Died: February 26, 2011 (aged 85)
- Education: University of Tokyo
- Awards: Asahi Prize (1982); Japan Prize (2004)
- Scientific career
- Fields: Photoelectrochemistry
- Doctoral students: Akira Fujishima

Kenichi Honda (本多健一, August 23, 1925 – February 26, 2011) was a Japanese chemist. He made a significant contribution to the discovery and characterization of photocatalytic properties of titanium dioxide (TiO_{2}), for which he shared the 2004 Japan Prize with his former student Akira Fujishima.

== Biography ==
In 1949 Honda received his bachelor's degree in engineering from the University of Tokyo. He then spent several years in France, where he defended a PhD in 1957 at the University of Paris. After returning to Japan he obtained a second doctorate degree, from the University of Tokyo in 1961. He then worked as a lecturer (1965–1975) and professor (1975–1983) at the University of Tokyo and at Kyoto University (1983–1989). In 1989 he moved to the Tokyo Polytechnic University and served as its president in 1996–2004.

== Research ==
In the late 1960s Honda and his doctorate student Akira Fujishima discovered the Honda-Fujishima effect - photocatalytic water decomposition (photolysis) upon exposing a titanium dioxide electrode to strong light. For this discovery, published in 1972, Honda and Fujishima received the 2004 Japan Prize.
