= Frank Fenner =

Australian virologist (1914–2010)

Professor Frank Fenner AC CMG MBE FRS FAA
- Born: Frank Johannes Fenner; 21 December 1914; Ballarat
- Died: 22 November 2010 (aged 95); Canberra
- Other name: Frank John Fenner (after 1938)
- Education: University of Adelaide
- Occupation: Virology
- Employer: Australian National University
- Known for: Eradication of smallpox Control of Australia's rabbit plague
- Spouse: Ellen Margaret Bobbie Roberts
- Parent(s): Albert Charles Fenner and Emma Louise "Peggy" Hirt

Frank John Fenner (21 December 1914 – 22 November 2010) was an Australian scientist with a distinguished career in the field of virology. His two greatest achievements are cited as overseeing the eradication of smallpox, and the attempted control of Australia's rabbit plague through the introduction of Myxoma virus.

The Australian Academy of Science awards annually the prestigious Fenner Medal for distinguished research in biology by a scientist under 40 years of age.

== Early life and education ==
Frank Johannes Fenner was born in Ballarat in 1914. His father was Charles Fenner. The family moved to Adelaide, South Australia in November 1916. He attended Rose Park Primary School and Thebarton Technical School. He attended the University of Adelaide, where he earned degrees in medicine and surgery in 1938. That year, uneasy about Hitler's rise, he legally changed his middle name from Johannes (the first name of his German-born paternal grandfather) to John.

== Career ==
In May 1937, Fenner was a member of an Adelaide University anthropological expedition to Nepabunna Mission in the northern Flinders Ranges in South Australia led by J. B. Cleland, which also included Charles P. Mountford as ethnologist and photographer, as well as botanist Thomas Harvey Johnston and others.

From 1940 to 1946 he was a captain and Major in the Australian Army Medical Corps with service in Australia, Palestine, Egypt, New Guinea and Borneo, as medical officer in field ambulance and Casualty Clearing Station, pathologist to general hospital and malariologist. For his work in combating malaria in Papua New Guinea he was made a Member of the Order of the British Empire in 1945.

Following his war-time service he was recruited by Frank Macfarlane Burnet to work at the Walter and Eliza Hall Institute of Medical Research in Melbourne. Initially they worked on smallpox in mice, for which he coined the term "mousepox", and later on the genetics of poxvirus.

In 1949, he received a fellowship to study at the Rockefeller Institute for Medical Research in New York City, he worked on mycobacterium Bairnsdale bacillus, which causes Buruli ulcer, the third most important mycobacterial disease worldwide after tuberculosis and leprosy. Here he worked with and was influenced by René Dubos, who is one of the claimed originators of the phrase "Think Globally, Act Locally".

=== In Canberra, 1949–2010 ===
Returning to Australia in 1949, he was appointed professor of microbiology at the new John Curtin School of Medical Research at the Australian National University (ANU), Canberra. Here he began studying viruses again, in particular the myxoma virus.

Throughout the 1940s and 1950s Australia had severe rabbit plagues. Fenner's work on the myxoma virus showed that initially it killed rabbits in 9 to 11 days and was 99.5% lethal. Under heavy selection pressure, the few rabbits that survived developed resistance, which meant that the pest was never completely eradicated, but their numbers were reduced. Prior to the release of the virus as a biological control for the rabbits, Fenner, Frank Macfarlane Burnet and Ian Clunies Ross famously injected themselves with myxoma virus, to prove it was not dangerous for humans.

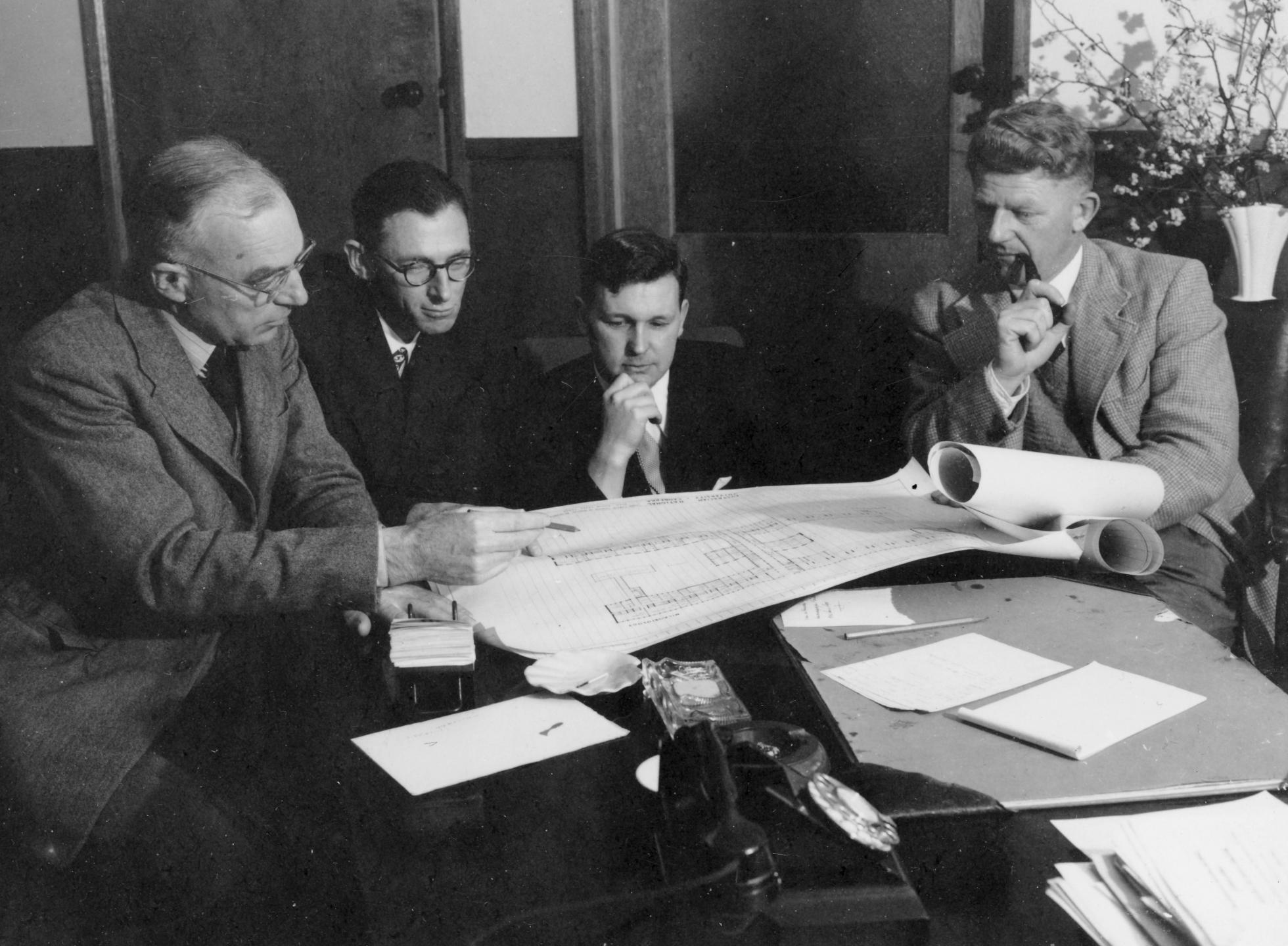
Fenner (second from right) and colleagues review plans for the John Curtin School of Medical Research

From 1967 to 1973 Fenner was Director of the John Curtin School of Medical Research. In 1977, he was named the chairman of the Global Commission for the Certification of Smallpox Eradication, the same year the last known case of naturally transmitted smallpox occurred in Somalia. Fenner announced the eradication of smallpox to the World Health Assembly on 8 May 1980. This success story is regarded as the greatest achievement of the World Health Organization. Before its eradication, smallpox was one of the world's most virulent viruses, responsible for millions of deaths, and leaving many of the victims who survived with disfiguring scars for life.

Fenner had an abiding interest in the environment, and was the foundation Director of the Centre for Resources and Environmental Studies at the ANU (1973), where he worked until his retirement in 1979, and which became part of the Fenner School of Environment and Society in 2007. He was a keen supporter of Australia having an ecologically, socially sustainable population. He was emeritus professor at the John Curtin School of Medical Research.

In June 2010, he predicted in an interview with The Australian the extinction of the human race within a century, primarily as the result of human overpopulation, environmental degradation and climate change.

He died in Canberra on the morning of 22 November 2010 after a brief illness, and days after the birth of his first great-grandchild.

== Personal life ==
In 1944 Fenner met Bobbie Roberts. Ellen Margaret 'Bobbie' Roberts was a trained midwife and nurse. During World War II she worked on malaria with the Australian Army Nursing Service and through her work met Fenner. Shortly after they met they married in a Catholic ceremony (despite Fenner being an atheist). While keen to have children, the couple were infertile and with Bobbie having a hysterectomy in 1949 they decided to adopt. They subsequently adopted two children. Marilyn Aldus Fenner was born on 27 June 1950. Her biological parents were unknown. Victoria Fenner (born 1 March 1943) was adopted later at the request of her father (Fenner's younger brother Tom) after the death in a fire of Victoria's mother (Beverley Slaney).

On 30 March 1958, Victoria Fenner shot and killed herself, as part of a supposed suicide pact with another child, Catherine Webb, who provided the rifle and bullets. The coronial inquiry heard she had been passing through a period of extreme mental and spiritual disturbance and the coroner declared her death a suicide. Fenner himself was unable to fathom a motive, other than she was upset from reading Neville Shute's book, On the Beach.

Bobbie Fenner was diagnosed with cancer in 1989 and eventually died in 1994. Marilyn Fenner and her family then moved into the family home and looked after her father until his death.

== Publications ==
- Frank Fenner and Francis Ratcliffe, Myxomatosis. Cambridge University Press, 1965. ISBN 0521049911
- Fenner, Frank; Wittek, Riccardo; Dumbell, Keith R. (1988). The Orthopoxviruses. Elsevier. ISBN 978-0-323-15022-4.

== Honours ==
Of the many honours Fenner received throughout his career, there are the following:

- Member of the Order of the British Empire (MBE), 19 July 1945
- Companion of the Order of St Michael and St George (CMG) 12 June 1976, in recognition of service to medical research
- The Macfarlane Burnet Medal and Lecture of the Australian Academy of Science, 1985
- The Japan Prize (Preventive Medicine), 1988 (with Donald Henderson and Isao Arita)
- Companion of the Order of Australia (AC) 26 January 1989, in recognition of service to medical science, to public health and to the environment
- Copley medal of the Royal Society, 1995
- Albert Einstein World Award of Science, 2000
- Clunies Ross Lifetime Contribution National Science and Technology Award, 2002
- Both the Frank Fenner building which houses the ANU Medical School and Faculty of Science, and a residential college Fenner Hall are named in honour of Frank Fenner.
- WHO Medal
- Mueller Medal (1964) and ANZAAS Medal (1980)
- ANZAC Peace Prize
- Matthew Flinders Medal and Lecture, 1967
- Britannica Australia Award for Medicine
- 2002 Prime Minister's Prize for Science
- ACT Senior Australian of the Year 2005
- The federal Division of Fraser, named for Jim Fraser, was renamed after Frank Fenner for the 2016 general election. This was due to the AEC's plans to name a seat in Victoria in honour of deceased Prime Minister Malcolm Fraser.
