= Yoshio Okamoto =

Japanese chemist (born 1941)

- Born: 10 January 1941 (age 85)
- Citizenship: Japanese
- Known for: asymmetric polymerization
- Awards: Japan Prize 2019
- Scientific career
- Institutions: Nagoya University, Harbin Engineering University

Yoshio Okamoto (岡本佳男; born 10 January 1941) is a Japanese chemist, who was awarded the 2019 Japan Prize for his groundbreaking work in asymmetric polymerization and its practical applications in drug discovery.

Okamoto was the first to prove that synthetic polymer conformations could be controllable, publishing work on asymmetric polymerization from 1979 onwards.

This led to the development by Okamoto and others of helical polymers for use in high performance liquid chromatography columns (HPLC), enabling easy separation of chiral drug molecules.

== Education and career ==
Okamoto received his B.S. (1964), M.S. (1966), and Ph.D. (1969) degrees from Osaka University, and served as assistant professor and associate professor at the university from 1969 to 1990. In 1990 he became a professor at Nagoya University. After retiring in 2004, he was appointed Guest Professor of EcoTopia Science Institute, Nagoya University. He was appointed as Chair Professor of Harbin Engineering University in 2007.

== Awards ==
Awards for his work include the Award of Society of Polymer Science, Japan (1982), The Chemical Society of Japan Award for 1999, Chirality Medal (2001), Medal with Purple Ribbon (Japanese Government) (2002), Fujiwara Prize (2005), and the Japan Prize (2019). In 2020, he became a laureate of the Asian Scientist 100 by the Asian Scientist.
