= Koyama Shisei =

- 小山 肆成

Personal details
- Born: 1807 Hisagi Village, Kii Province, Japan
- Died: October 28, 1862 (aged 54–55) Kyoto, Yamashiro Province, Japan

Koyama Shisei (Japanese: 小山 肆成; 1807-1862) was a Japanese samurai physician and vaccinologist. He also used the name Hōshū (蓬洲).

Koyama's reputation was such that he was compared with other outstanding scientists of his time, as in the phrase, "Seishū of the north, Hōshū of the south" (北の青洲、南の蓬洲).

== Biography ==
He was born in 1807 near Hisagi (久木) village in rural Kii Province to a jizamurai family. When he was young, he traveled to Kyoto to study with his elder brother Koyama Fumiaki (小山 文明), but Fumiaki "died suddenly in a fit of rage" (憤死) in 1822. In 1823, he began studying Confucianism under his brother's teacher Okada Nangai (岡田 南涯), and medical science under Takagai Ki'en (高階 枳園), a physician to the Imperial Court. He also studied herbal medicine and kanpō. Eventually, Koyama opened his own medical practice on Karasuma Street.

At the beginning of the 19th century, the Balmis Expedition introduced Edward Jenner's technique of using cowpox to inoculate patients against smallpox to Qing China. Hearing of this, Koyama obtained from Takagai Ki'en a copy of the Chinese book Yin dou lue (引痘略, Intōryaku) written by Qiu Xi (邱 熺) which contained an explanation of Jennerian inoculation. Koyama's activities are primarily responsible for this information becoming widely available in Japan.

During the Tenpō famine (1833–1837), an epidemic of smallpox ravaged Koyama's native Kii Province. After he learned that his nephew's entire family had died of smallpox in 1835, he immersed himself in research to discover a way to combat the disease. Koyama sold almost all of his personal belongings, including his family swords, in order to raise money to buy cattle for his research. The cattle were used to cultivate cowpox samples.

In 1849, Koyama successfully tested Japan's first Jennerian smallpox vaccine, Gyūkajintōbyō (牛化人痘苗).

Koyama died in Kyoto in 1862.

== See also ==
- Kuwata Ryūsai (1811–1868)
- Fukase Yōshun
- Isao Arita
