= Georges Vendryes =

French physicist

Georges Vendryès or Georges Vendryes (1920 – 16 September 2014) was a French physicist who played a significant role in the French nuclear industry and is considered the "father" of fast breeder reactor technology, for which he received the Enrico Fermi Prize and Japan Prize.

Vendryes studied at the École Polytechnique and the École des Ponts et Chaussées and received his doctorate in nuclear physics at the Sorbonne. From 1948 he was employed by the French nuclear research authority CEA, where he made his first experiments under Frédéric Joliot-Curie. At the CEA he worked on neutron transport experiments and research and development of different type of reactors including controlled thermonuclear fusion. and was significant in the construction of various important installations such as Harmonie (1965), Masurca (1966), Rapsodie (1967), Phenix (1973) and Superphénix (1985).

He was appointed Director of the Nuclear Reactors Department of the CEA in 1971, and was Adviser to the CEA Administrator General from 1983 to 1988.

In 1984 he received the Enrico Fermi Prize and in 1988 he received the Japan Prize. He was an officer of the Legion of Honor and Grand Officer of the Ordre national du Mérite and was awarded the Federal Cross of Merit. He was a member of the National Academy of Engineering and Honorary Vice President of the CEA. In 2007, he received the first Eminent Scientist Award from the Indian Nuclear Society.

Georges Vendryes died on 16 September 2014.
