= Goro Takahashi =

Japanese silversmith (1939–2013)

- 髙橋吾郎
- Born: June 29, 1939; Jujo, Tokyo, Japan
- Died: November 25, 2013 (aged 74)
- Other name: Yellow Eagle
- Occupations: Silversmith, leather worker, founder of Goro's
- Years active: 1954–2013
- Relatives: Eddie Little Sky (adoptive father)

Goro Takahashi (髙橋吾郎; June 29, 1939 – November 25, 2013), also known as Yellow Eagle, was a Japanese silversmith and leather craftsman renowned for his Native American–inspired works sold through his brand and store Goro's. Goro traveled extensively through the United States, where he learned silversmithing and immersed himself in Native American culture, spending time with the Oglala Lakota people to the point of being adopted by a Lakota family and becoming the first Japanese person to participate in a Sun Dance. Goro's jewelry achieved cult status in Japan and internationally, thanks in part to celebrities like Takuya Kimura, Eric Clapton, and John Mayer who wear and collect his work.

== Biography ==
=== Early life ===
Goro was born in Jujo, Tokyo, on June 29, 1939, and had five older brothers. Despite being the sixth child, he was called Goro (after go (五), the number five in Japanese) because at the time of his birth he was the fifth living son, as one of his older brothers had already died in war. His father Seiji (清二) was a hardware seller who wrote haiku under the pseudonym Seisen (清 泉).

During junior high school, Goro attended a summer camp in the forest of Hayama, Kanagawa. There he met an American soldier stationed in Japan who, despite the language barrier, taught him leather crafting. Goro kept visiting him year after year, until eventually the soldier was relieved of his duties and returned to the US. Before leaving, he gifted Goro his leather-crafting tools. After graduation, at the age of 16, Goro interrupted his studies and used those tools to craft leather belts and engrave them with floral patterns characteristic of the American West. He brought these belts to Nakata Shoten (ja:中田商店), a shop dealing in military paraphernalia in the Ameyoko shopping district in Ueno. The owner, Tadao Nakata (中田忠夫), initially placed an order of 100 belts, and later commissioned Goro leather bags, Native and Western accessories. During this time he briefly took on an apprentice, his nephew Taro Takahashi (ja:高橋太郎), who would later become a surfer renowned for crafting the first fiberglass surfboard in Japan.

=== Founding Goro's and gaining recognition ===
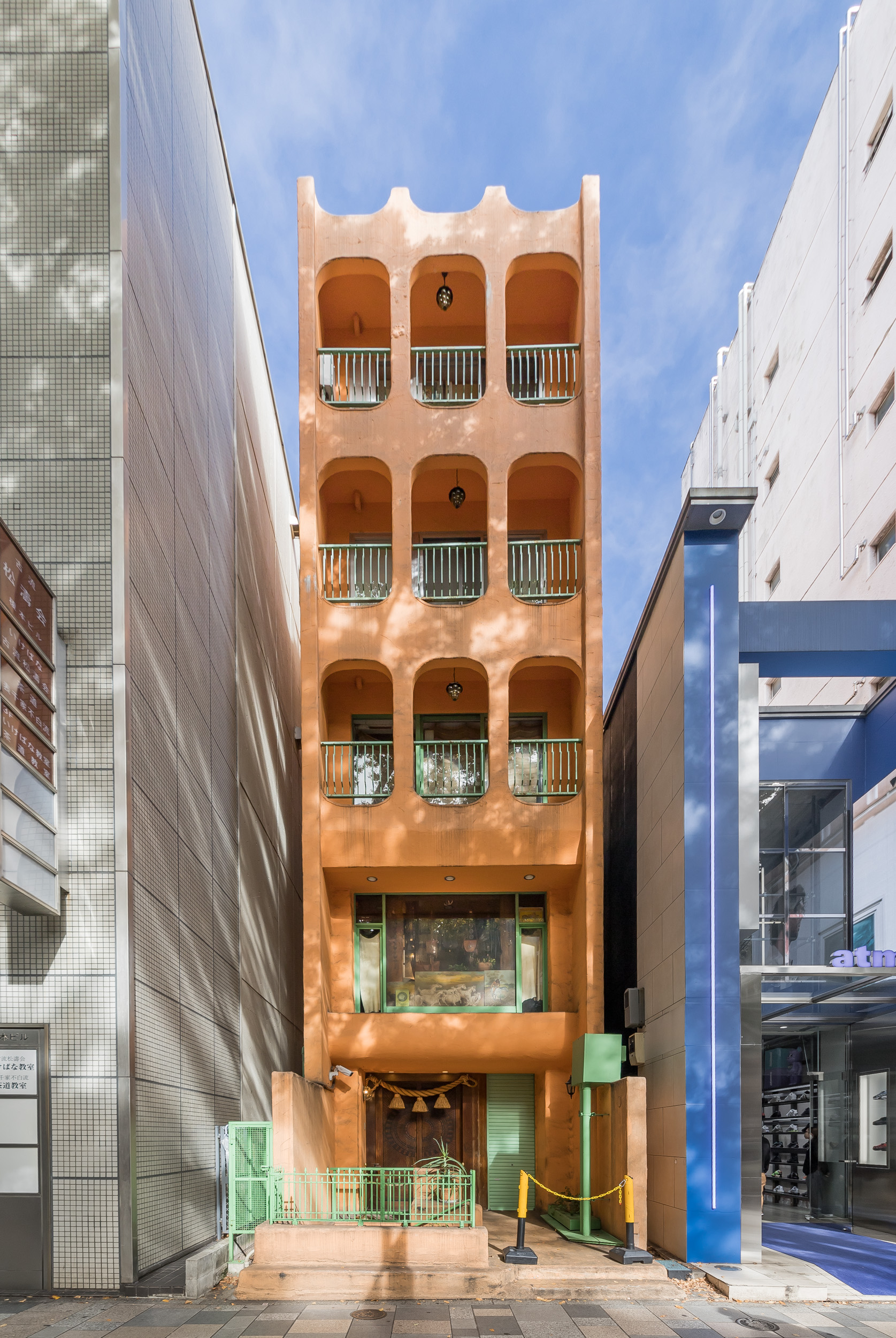
The building that houses Goro's (2nd floor) in Omotesandō

In 1956, Goro founded his brand, Goro's (ja:ゴローズ), in Komagome, Tokyo, where he was living. The logo was designed by his friend Vartan Kurjian, an American designer who lived in Tokyo at the time. Until the late 1960s, Goro mostly produced leather goods while gradually experimenting with brass buckles and metal fittings. Goro opened an atelier on the second floor of the Central Apartment building Minami-Aoyama in 1966, where he lived. There he worked on everything from deerskin jackets and trousers to pieces of furniture, including customizing his own Isuzu Bellett with leather upholstery carved with his designs.

During this time Goro frequented clubs like MUGEN (ムゲン) in Akasaka, a hip go-go bar famous for being frequented by celebrities. This is where he befriended designers such as Takeo Kikuchi and Junko Hoshino, as well as mingled with celebrities like Tina Turner, who commissioned his work. It was around this time that Goro made his first appearance in the menswear magazine MEN'S CLUB. In 1972 he opened the Goro's store on Omotesandō in Harajuku, a district of Tokyo internationally recognized as a center of Japanese youth culture and fashion.

=== In the United States ===
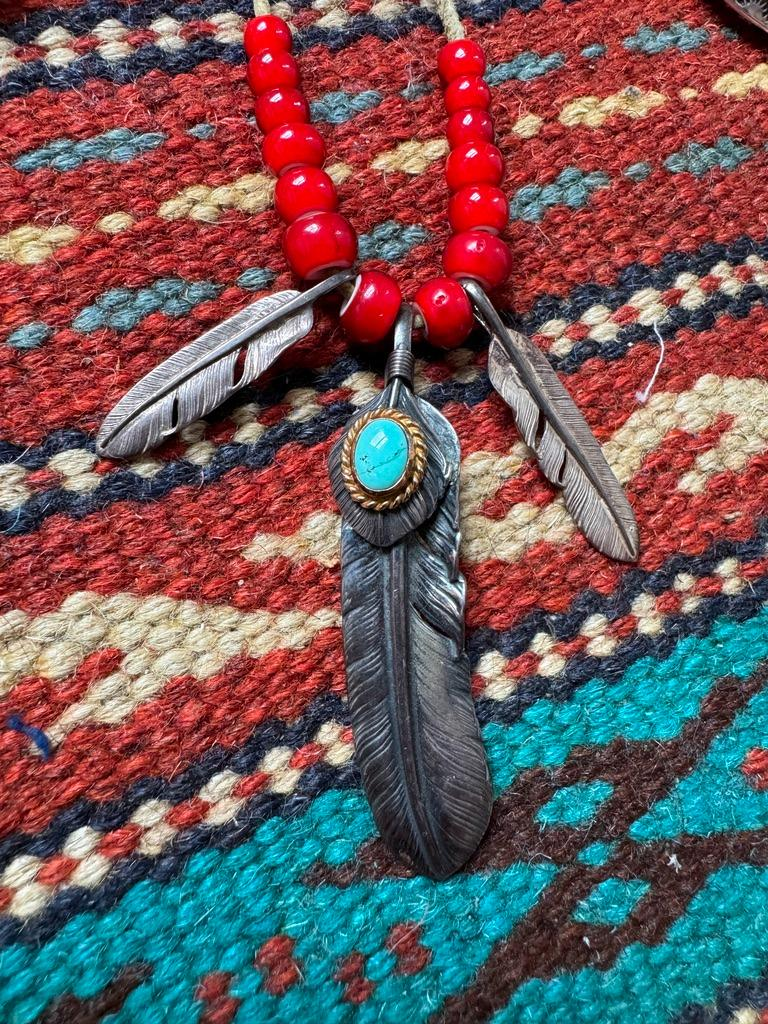
Silver feathers crafted by Goro Takahashi

In 1967, when he was 28 years old, Goro traveled to New York City during his first visit to the United States. There he visited a museum (Note: While Goro mentions "the Smithsonian", the Smithsonian Institution did not have a presence in New York in 1967. It is likely he either visited the MET or the Museum of the American Indian of the Heye Foundation, which became part of the Smithsonian in 1989, and whose collection became the foundation for the present National Museum of the American Indian located in Washington, D.C.) where, for the first time, he saw Native American artifacts, jewelry, and silverwork in person. Going back to Japan, he saved money, and whenever he had earned enough he would return to the United States. In 1971, Goro visited Flagstaff, Arizona, during a trip on U.S. Route 66. There he was approached by an Arizona silversmith, Jed Deutschman, (Note: He is referred to as "JED" (uppercase), which was Jed Deutschman's signature stamp. The biographies given for JED and Jed Deutschman match in numerous distinctive details.) who asked him about the leather accessories he was wearing. Despite the language barrier, the two bonded, forming a friendship that would last for the rest of their lives. Jed taught Goro how to craft accessories from silver, his first project being a concho made using a crushed one dollar silver coin. In return, Goro bartered the products of his leather-crafting skills. After returning to Japan from this trip, Goro started crafting Native American inspired silver jewelry and selling it at Goro's.

In 1979 he traveled to the Pine Ridge Indian Reservation in South Dakota where he met Eddie Little Sky, his wife Dawn Little Sky and his son Beau Little, who later adopted him in their family as a huŋká relative, a traditional Lakota kinship relationship. There he underwent a naming ceremony and received the name of Yellow Eagle (as in "eagle from the east") by the medicine man. Also in 1979, Goro was allowed to participate in a Sun Dance ceremony, becoming the first Japanese person to do so. The bald eagle, the eagle's feather, and the medicine wheel would go on to become the signature motifs used in his work. Shortly after returning to Japan from this trip he became the first officially sanctioned Native American–style silversmith in Japan.

=== Back in Japan ===
Goro's fame grew in the 1980s and 1990s, propelled by the Amekaji and Shibuya Casual trends in fashion at the time, as well as being featured in popular menswear publications like Men's Club and Popeye. During this time he was running the store alone, which made him an easy target for shoplifters. To put an end to it, in the winter of 1991 Goro started allowing only one person or group at a time, which led to a more personalized shopping experience and longer lines outside his store, both of which further increased his fame. One day, thinking of his customers sitting on the cold guardrails in winter, he installed a 30-foot-long (10 m) log on the sidewalk, which became an Harajuku attraction in itself. The log was eventually removed by the Tokyo Metropolitan Government after ten years, in 2002.

In 1987, Goro injured his right hand in a fire accident, which left him without a finger on his dominant hand. This made Goro consider permanently closing the store, but he was dissuaded by a Buddhist priest and friend of his, who pushed him to continue his work. Goro kept producing and working at the store until the 2000s, when he retired to focus on creative endeavors in his Tokyo studio. He died on November 25, 2013, at the age of 74.

== Legacy ==
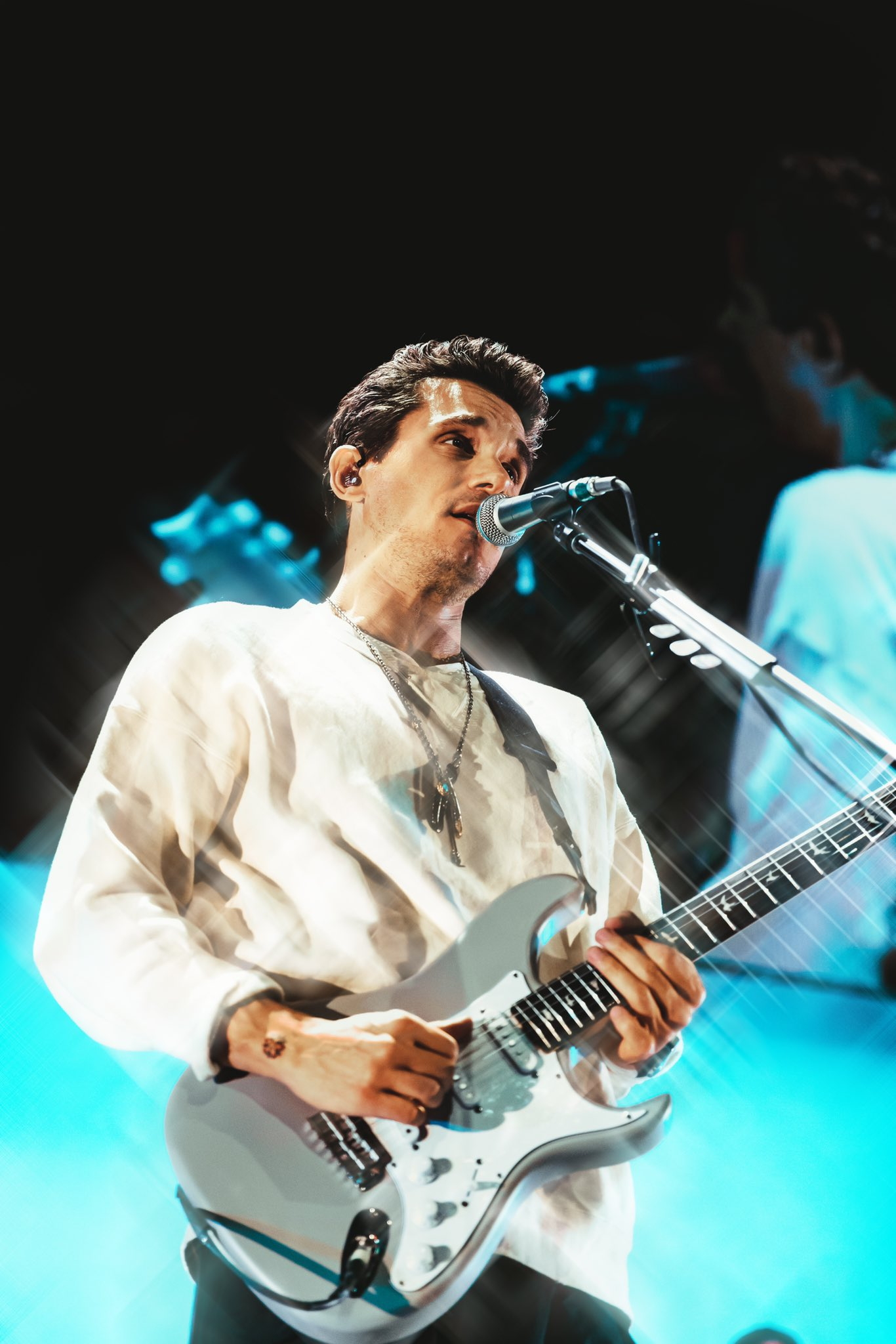
John Mayer wearing Goro's

Goro's work originated the Native American jewelry world of Japan, inspiring many Japanese people to take up silversmithing and craft silver feathers, eagles, and other Native motifs. Some of these people were his apprentices, like Taneaki Tajiri (田尻種彬) of TADY & KING and Takashi Murata (村田高詩) of STUDIO T&Y, while others, like Ken Kikuchi (ケンキクチ) of the homonymous brand and Kazuya Ito (伊藤 一也) of First Arrow's, are unaffiliated, but were strongly influenced by his work. Goro has had an impact beyond silversmithing, and inspired people like Hiroki Nakamura of Visvim with his attitude towards craftsmanship and the freedom with which he lived his life.

Goro's work has been prized and worn by many celebrities. In the West, John Mayer and Eric Clapton are known to collect his work. Clapton discovered Goro's in the 90s through Hiroshi Fujiwara, and had Goro make him a custom guitar strap. In Japan, Takuya Kimura was an important figure in popularizing Goro's. Hiroshi Fujiwara, Ken Kaneko, Tomomi Itano, Ronnie Wood, Ed Sheeran, G-Dragon, Shawn Yue and JJ Lin, among others, are known to wear his work.

The Goro's store in Omotesandō is still open and operated by his descendants and staff, who are now crafting the items. Visiting the store in person is the only way to buy brand new Goro's, as they do not have a web store nor retailers. The shop still only allows one customer at a time, and instituted a lottery system to make sure the volume of purchases does not exceed an allotted daily capacity as well as a countermeasure to deter flippers.

Because Goro's work continues to be prized and increase in market value, it has been subject to intense counterfeiting. To counter this, Goro's maintains a log "of all purchases, orders, and repairs" created in person at the shop, and does not provide authenticity appraisals nor certificates. These records are also used to gauge a customer's history with the brand, and the most loyal customers are rewarded with the opportunity to buy exclusive items that are not sold to novices. Other limitations are imposed on what a customer can or cannot buy, for example first-time customers do not get to pick their first item, which is instead chosen for them by the staff based on what they think will suit the customer best. Also, customers cannot buy more than one feather per day.

== Personal life ==
Goro was considered a perfectionist and a free-spirited man, dividing his time between honing his craft and roaming Tokyo and the United States on his motorcycles. Goro had a dog named Snow, a white Kishu he adopted after finding him abandoned on a beach in Chiba, where Goro was looking for driftwood to put on display in the shop. Much to the dismay of other pet owners, Goro was renowned for letting Snow roam free without a collar, not picking up his feces, and bringing him on his motorcycle on both his daily commute and longer trips.

Goro started riding motorcycles in his mid-40s and owned several Harley-Davidson and Indian Motorcycles both in Japan and in the United States. When he turned 50, he rode a red 1937 Indian Chief on a solo trip from Los Angeles to the Pine Ridge Indian Reservation in South Dakota for a ceremony. He would often visit the Little Sky family in August, staying for three months, living in his tipi and riding motorcycles with his adoptive brother Beau, who was also a biker. In South Dakota he also participated in a Sturgis Motorcycle Rally. In 1992 he embarked on a transcontinental trip from Los Angeles to New York City via Milwaukee, where, despite riding an Indian, he attended Harley-Davidson's 90th anniversary party and met Willie G. Davidson.

== Sources ==
- Teruhiko, Doi, ed. (2012). 原宿ゴローズ大全 vol.1 [Harajuku Goro's Complete Guide vol.1] (in English and Japanese). Translated by Kayama, Shigeko (Multilingual ed.). Tokyo: World Photo Press. ISBN 9784846529567.
- Teruhiko, Doi, ed. (2013). 原宿ゴローズ大全 vol.2 [Harajuku Goro's Complete Guide vol.2] (in English and Japanese). Translated by Kayama, Shigeko (Multilingual ed.). Tokyo: World Photo Press. ISBN 9784846529994.
