= Donald Henderson =

American physician (1928-2016)

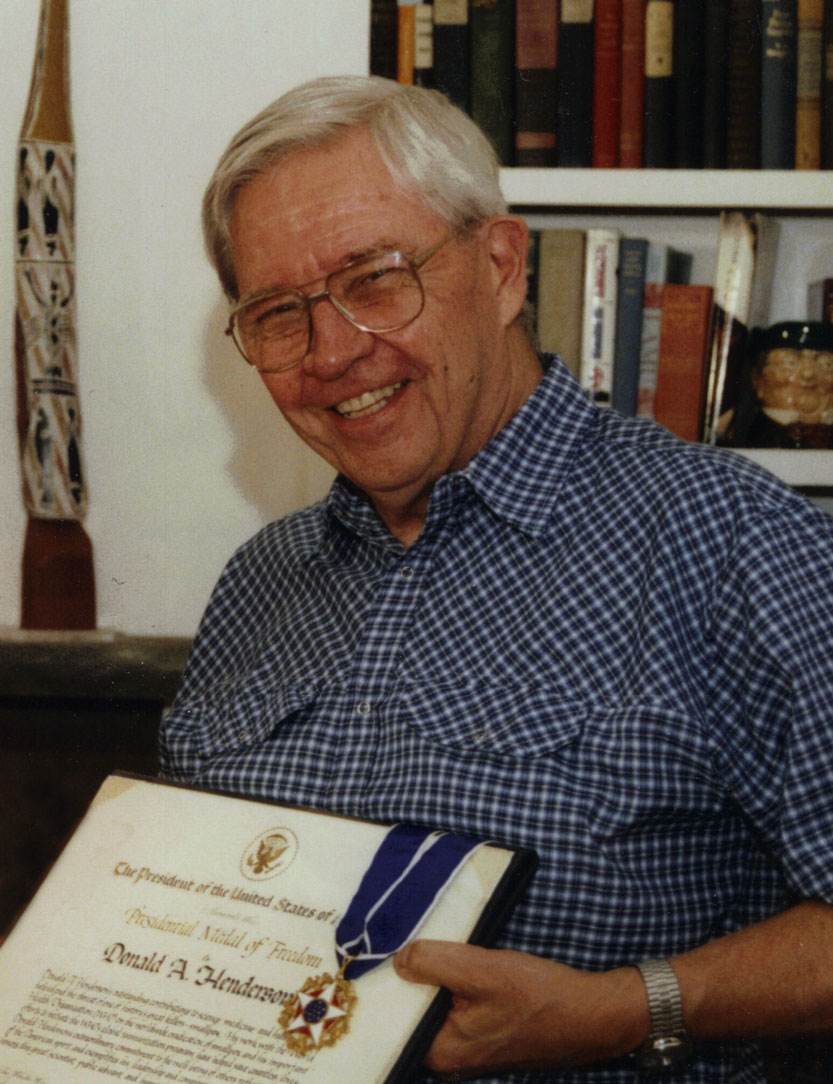
- Henderson with his Presidential Medal of Freedom in July 2002
- Born: Donald Ainslie Henderson; September 7, 1928; Lakewood, Ohio, U.S.
- Died: August 19, 2016 (aged 87); Baltimore, Maryland, U.S.
- Education: Oberlin College (BA); University of Rochester (MD); Johns Hopkins University (MPH)
- Known for: Eradicating smallpox Founding the Center for Health Security
- Awards: Ernst Jung Prize (1976); Public Welfare Medal (1978); National Medal of Science (1986); Japan Prize (1988); Albert B. Sabin Gold Medal (1994); Calderone Prize (1999); Presidential Medal of Freedom (2002)
- Scientific career
- Fields: Epidemiology
- Workplaces: World Health Organization; Johns Hopkins University; University of Pittsburgh; UPMC Center for Health Security

Donald Ainslie Henderson (September 7, 1928 – August 19, 2016) was an American physician, educator, and epidemiologist who directed a 10-year international effort (1967–1977) that eradicated smallpox throughout the world and launched international childhood vaccination programs. From 1977 to 1990, he was Dean of the Johns Hopkins School of Public Health. Later, he played a leading role in instigating national programs for public health preparedness and response following biological attacks and national disasters via establishing the Center for Health Security. At the time of his death, he was Professor and Dean Emeritus of the Johns Hopkins Bloomberg School of Public Health, and Professor of Medicine and Public Health at the University of Pittsburgh, as well as Distinguished Scholar and former Founder of the Center for Health Security.

== Early life and education ==
Henderson was born in Ohio. His father, David Henderson, was an engineer; his mother, Eleanor McMillan, was a nurse. His interest in medicine was inspired by a Canadian uncle, William McMillan, who was a general practitioner and senior member of the Canadian House of Commons.

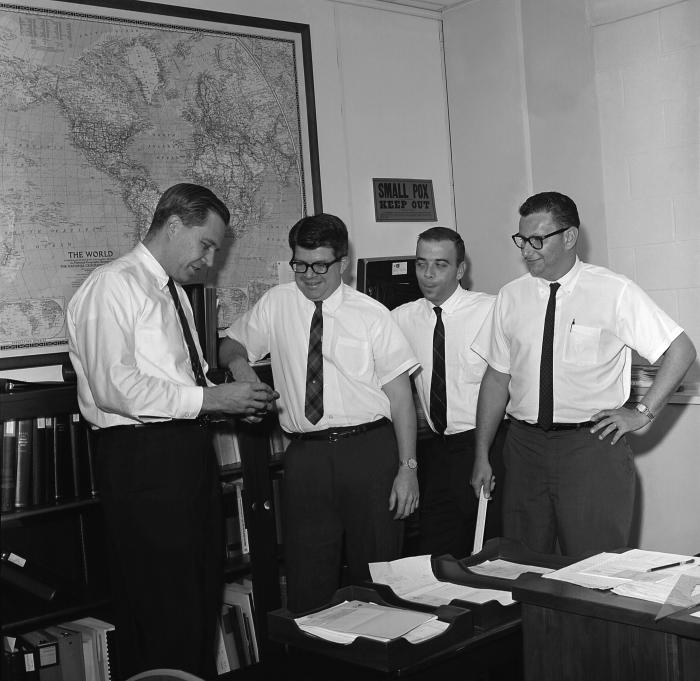
Henderson (first man on left) as part of the CDC's smallpox eradication team in 1966

Henderson graduated from Oberlin College in 1950 and received his MD from the University of Rochester School of Medicine in 1954. He was a resident physician in medicine at the Mary Imogene Bassett Hospital in Cooperstown, New York, and, later, a Public Health Service Officer in the Epidemic Intelligence Service of the Communicable Disease Center (now the Centers for Disease Control and Prevention—CDC). He earned an MPH degree in 1960 from the Johns Hopkins School of Hygiene and Public Health (now the Johns Hopkins Bloomberg School of Public Health).

== Research and career ==
=== Eradication of smallpox ===
Henderson served as Chief of the CDC virus disease surveillance programs from 1960 to 1965, working closely with epidemiologist Alexander Langmuir. During this period, he and his unit developed a proposal for a United States Agency for International Development (USAID) program to eliminate smallpox and control measles during a 5-year period in 18 contiguous countries in western and central Africa. This project was funded by USAID, with field operations beginning in 1967.

The USAID initiative provided an important impetus to a World Health Organization (WHO) program to eradicate smallpox throughout the world within a 10-year period. In 1966, Henderson moved to Geneva to become director of the campaign. At that time, smallpox was occurring widely throughout Brazil and in 30 countries in Africa and South Asia. More than 10 million cases and 2 million deaths were occurring annually. Vaccination brought some control, but the key strategy was "surveillance-containment". This technique entailed rapid reporting of cases from all health units and prompt vaccination of household members and close contacts of confirmed cases. WHO staff and advisors from some 73 countries worked closely with national staff. The last case occurred in Somalia on October 26, 1977, only 10 years after the program began. Three years later, the World Health Assembly recommended that smallpox vaccination could cease. Smallpox is the first human disease ever to be eradicated. This success gave impetus to WHO's global Expanded Program on Immunization, which targeted other vaccine-preventable diseases, including poliomyelitis, measles, tetanus, diphtheria, and whooping cough. Now targeted for eradication are poliomyelitis and Guinea Worm disease; after 25 years, this objective is close to being achieved.

=== Later work ===
From 1977 through August 1990, Henderson was Dean of the Johns Hopkins School of Public Health. After being awarded the 1986 National Medal of Science by Ronald Reagan for his work leading the World Health Organization (WHO) smallpox eradication campaign, Henderson launched a public struggle to reverse the Reagan administration's decision to default on WHO payments. In 1991, he was appointed associate director for life sciences, Office of Science and Technology Policy, Executive Office of the President (1991–93) and, later, deputy assistant secretary and senior science advisor in the Department of Health and Human Services (HHS). In 1998, he became the founding director of the Johns Hopkins Center for Civilian Biodefense Strategies, now the Johns Hopkins Center for Health Security.

Following the September 11, 2001, attack on the World Trade Center, HHS Secretary Tommy G. Thompson asked Henderson to assume responsibility for the Office of Public Health Preparedness (later the Office of the Assistant Secretary for Preparedness and Response). For this purpose, $3 billion was appropriated by Congress.

In 2006, Henderson co-authored a paper in which the authors were skeptical of several potential pandemic measures, including social distancing: "Many could result in significant disruption of the social functioning of communities and result in possibly serious economic problems. Such negative consequences might be worth chancing if there were compelling evidence or reason to believe they would seriously diminish the consequences or spread of a pandemic. However, few analyses have been produced that weigh the hoped-for efficacy of such measures against the potential impacts of large-scale or long-term implementation of these measures."

At the time of his death, he served as the Editor Emeritus of the academic journal Health Security (formerly Biosecurity and Bioterrorism: Biodefense Strategy, Practice, and Science).

=== Honors and awards ===
- 1975 – George McDonald Medal, London School of Tropical Medicine
- 1978 – Public Welfare Medal, National Academy of Sciences
- 1985 – Albert Schweitzer International Prize for Medicine
- 1986 – National Medal of Science in Biology
- 1988 – The Japan Prize, shared with Isao Arita and Frank Fenner
- 1990 – Health for All Medal, World Health Organization
- 1993 – Walter Reed Medal, The American Society of Tropical Medicine & Hygiene
- 1994 – Albert B. Sabin Gold Medal, Sabin Foundation
- 1995 – John Stearns Medal, New York Academy of Medicine
- 1996 – Edward Jenner Medal, Royal Society of Medicine
- 2001 – Clan Henderson Society, Chiefs Order
- 2002 – Presidential Medal of Freedom
- 2007 – John Snow Society's Pumphandle Lecture
- 2013 – Order of Brilliant Star, with Grand Cordon, Republic of China
- 2014 – Prince Mahidol Award, Thailand
- 2015 – Charles Merieux Award, National Foundation for Infectious Diseases

Seventeen universities conferred honorary degrees on Henderson.

=== Selected publications ===
- Fenner F, Henderson DA, Arita I, Jezek Z, Ladnyi. (1988) Smallpox and Its Eradication (ISBN 92-41-56110-6), Geneva, World Health Organization. The definitive archival history of smallpox.
- Henderson DA. (2009) Smallpox, the Death of a Disease (ISBN 978-1591027225) New York: Prometheus Books
- Henderson DA (1993) Surveillance systems and intergovernmental cooperation. In: Morse SS, ed. Emerging Viruses. New York: Oxford University Press: 283–289.
- Henderson DA, Borio LL (2005) Bioterrorism: an overview. In Principles and Practice of Infectious Diseases (Eds. Mandell MD, Bennett JE, Dolin R) Phil, Churchill Livingstone, 3591–3601.
- Henderson DA (2010) The global eradication of smallpox: Historical Perspective and Future Prospects in The Global Eradication of Smallpox (Ed: Bhattacharya S, Messenger S) Orient Black Swan, London. 7–35
- Henderson DA, Shelokov A (1959). "Medical progress: Epidemic neuromyasthenia—clinical syndrome". The New England Journal of Medicine. 260 (15): 757–764, 814–818. doi:10.1056/NEJM195904092601506. PMID 13644582.
- Langmuir AD, Henderson DA, Serfling RE (1964). "The epidemiological basis for the control of influenza". American Journal of Public Health and the Nation's Health. 54 (4): 563–571. doi:10.2105/ajph.54.4.563. PMC 1254817. PMID 14136320.
- Neff JM, Lane JM, Pert JH, Moore R, Millar JD, Henderson DA (1967). "Complications of smallpox vaccination: I. National survey in the United States, 1963". The New England Journal of Medicine. 276 (3): 125–132. doi:10.1056/nejm196701192760301. PMID 4381041.
- Henderson DA. (1967) Smallpox eradication and measles-control programs in West and Central Africa: Theoretical and practical approaches and problems. Industry and Trop Health VI, 112–120, Harvard School of Public Health, Boston.
- Henderson DA (1972). "Epidemiology in the global eradication of smallpox". International Journal of Epidemiology. 1 (1): 25–30. doi:10.1093/ije/1.1.25. PMID 4669176.
- Henderson DA (1975). "Smallpox eradication—the final battle (Jenner Lecture)". Journal of Clinical Pathology. 28 (11): 843–849. doi:10.1136/jcp.28.11.843. PMC 475879. PMID 802231.
- Henderson DA (1976). "The eradication of smallpox". Scientific American. 235 (4): 25–33. Bibcode:1976SciAm.235d..25H. doi:10.1038/scientificamerican1076-25. PMID 788150.
- Henderson DA (1998). "The challenge of eradication: lessons from past eradication campaigns (The Pittsfield Lecture)". The International Journal of Tuberculosis and Lung Disease. 2: 54–58.
- Henderson, DA (1998), "The siren song of eradication", Journal of the Royal College of Physicians of London, 32 (6): 580–84, doi:10.1016/S0035-8819(25)01808-2, PMC 9662996, PMID 9881317.
- Henderson, DA (1999). "The looming threat of bioterrorism". Science. 283 (5406): 1279–82. Bibcode:1999Sci...283.1279.. doi:10.1126/science.283.5406.1279. PMID 10037590.
- Henderson, DA; Inglesby, TV; Barlett, JG; et al. (1999). "Smallpox as a biological weapon: medical and public health management". JAMA. 281 (22): 2127–37. doi:10.1001/jama.281.22.2127. PMID 10367824.
- O'Toole, T; Henderson, DA (2001). "A clearly present danger: confronting the threat of bioterrorism". Harvard International Forum. 23: 49–53.

== Personal life ==
Henderson married Nana Irene Bragg in 1951. The couple had a daughter and two sons, whom they raised in Atlanta, Georgia and Geneva, Switzerland. He died at Gilchrist Hospice, Towson, Maryland, at the age of 87, after fracturing his hip.
