= History of apoptosis research =

Apoptosis is the process of programmed cell death. From its early conceptual beginnings in the 1950s, it has exploded as an area of research within the life sciences community. As well as its implication in many diseases, it is an integral part of biological development.

== Early research, and the "worm people" at Cambridge ==
Sydney Brenner's studies on animal development began in the late 1950s in what was to become the Laboratory of Molecular Biology (LMB) in Cambridge, UK. It was at this lab that during the 1970s and 1980s, a team led by John Sulston succeeded in tracing the nematode Caenorhabditis elegans entire embryonic cell lineage. In other words, Sulston and his team had traced where each and every cell in the roundworm's embryo came from during the division process, and where it ended up.

H. Robert Horvitz arrived from the US at the LMB in 1974, where he collaborated with Sulston. Both would share the 2002 Nobel Prize in Physiology or Medicine with Brenner, and Horvitz would go back to the US in 1978 to establish his own lab at the Massachusetts Institute of Technology.

Brenner's original interests were centered in genetics and in the development of the nervous system, but cell lineage and differentiation inevitably led to the study of cell fate:

One aspect of the cell lineage particularly caught my attention: in addition to the 959 cells generated during worm development and found in the adult, another 131 cells are generated but are not present in the adult. These cells are absent because they undergo programmed cell death - Horvitz: "Worms, Life and Death," 2002.

Programmed cell death had been known long before "the worm people" began to publish their celebrated findings. In 1964 Richard A. Lockshin and Carroll Williams published their contribution on "Endocrine potentiation of the breakdown of the intersegmental muscles of silkmoths", where they used the concept of programmed cell death during a time when little research was being carried out on this topic. John W. Saunders, Jr., stated the following in his 1966 contribution titled "Death in Embryonic Systems":

Abundant death, often cataclysmic in its onslaught, is part of early development in many animals; it is the usual method of eliminating organs and tissues that is useful only during embryonic or larval life

Saunders and Lockshin reciprocally acknowledged that they benefited from each other's work, and both pointed out the possibility that cell death might be regulated. Their observations helped to lead later work toward the genetic pathways of programmed cell death.

== Coining of the term apoptosis ==
In a signal article published in 1972, John F. Kerr, Andrew H. Wyllie and A. R. Currie, coined the term "apoptosis" in order to differentiate naturally occurring developmental cell death, from the necrosis that results from acute tissue injury. They adopted the Greek word for the process of leaves falling from trees or petals falling from flowers. The word apoptosis is a combination of the prefix 'apo' and the root 'ptosis': 'apo' means 'away', 'off' or 'apart', and 'ptosis' means 'falling'. Based on the origin of the word it makes sense that it should be pronounced "APE oh TOE sis". The pronunciation "a POP tuh sis", although commonly used, ignores the origin of the word.

They also noted that the characteristic structural changes of apoptosis were present in cells that died in order to maintain an equilibrium between cell proliferation and death in a particular tissue.

== Discovery of bcl-2 ==
Landmark research by David L. Vaux and colleagues described the anti-apoptotic and tumorigenic (tumor-causing) role of the human cancer gene bcl-2. Researchers had been hot in the track of oncogenes, and now more and more of the pieces were falling into place. However, although bcl-2 was the first component of the cell death mechanism to be cloned in any organism, identification of other components of the vertebrate mechanism had to await the linking of apoptosis with the mechanism for programmed cell death in the worm.

== 1990s and later ==
In 1991, Ron Ellis, Junying Yuan and Horvitz released a rounded and up-to-date account of research on programmed cell death in their "Mechanisms and Functions of Cell Death". Among other important work at Horvitz's laboratory, graduate students Hilary Ellis and Chand Desai had made the first discovery of genes that encode apoptosis-inducing proteins: ced-3 and ced-4. Michael Hengartner also identified a gene with an opposite effect: ced-9. The product of this gene, which is similar to bcl-2, protects cells from programmed cell death, so its expression conveys a life-or-death decision on individual cells.

In 1992, it was shown by David Vaux and Stuart Kim at Stanford that human bcl-2 gene could inhibit programmed cell death in the worm, thus linking programmed cell death and apoptosis - revealing them to be the same, evolutionarily conserved process.

In 1993, graduate students Shai Shaham and Junying Yuan working in Horvitz's laboratory identified interleukin-1-beta-converting enzyme as the mammalian homolog of the CED-3 enzyme. In 1994, Michael Hengartner published a paper showing that ced-9 had similar sequence to bcl-2.

In 1997, a protein similar to CED-4 was identified and named Apaf-1 (apoptotic protease activating factor). The team published their results in an article entitled "Apaf-1, a human protein homologous to C. elegans CED-4, participates in cytochrome c-dependent activation of caspase-3". It identified and reconstituted the mitochondrial pathway to apoptosis and illuminated whole new avenues of research on inflammatory diseases, cancer, and apoptosis in general.

By 1998, research on the topic had already increased, as attested in the editorial "Cell Death in Us and Others", written by an important contributor to apoptosis research, Pierre Golstein, in the 28 August 1998 issue of Science:

Although there have been scattered reports on the topic of cell death for more than a century, the 20,000 publications on this topic within the past 5 years reflect a shift from historically mild interest to contemporary fascination
