= Ira Herskowitz =

American geneticist

- Born: July 14, 1946
- Died: April 28, 2003
- Education: California Institute of Technology, Massachusetts Institute of Technology
- Occupations: Geneticist, academic
- Employers: University of California, San Francisco; University of Oregon
- Awards: MacArthur Fellows Program (1987); Thomas Hunt Morgan Medal (2002); NAS Award for Scientific Reviewing (For his incisive reviews of phage biology, both literary and pictorial, that have focused and enlivened their subject for practitioners and spectators alike., 1985); Rosenstiel Award (2002); Genetics Society of America Medal (1988); Mendel Medal (1991); Howard Taylor Ricketts Prize (1992)

Ira Herskowitz (July 14, 1946 – April 28, 2003) was an American phage and yeast geneticist who studied genetic regulatory circuits and mechanisms. He was particularly noted for his work on mating type switching and cellular differentiation, largely using Saccharomyces cerevisiae as a model organism.

== Education ==
Ira Herskowitz and his twin brother Joel were born in Brooklyn, New York on 14 July 1946. Their father Irwin Herskowitz was a Drosophila geneticist, at Indiana University and later at Saint Louis University.

Ira Herskowitz became interested in bacteriophages when he studied with Robert Stuart Edgar at California Institute of Technology. After completing a degree in 1967, he entered Massachusetts Institute of Technology (MIT), where he studied the molecular biology of the lambda phage. Herskowitz worked with Ethan Signer, whose other students include Nancy Kleckner and Frederick M. Ausubel. He received his Ph.D. from MIT in 1971. He spent his final year at MIT working with David Botstein. Herskowitz and Botstein attended the Cold Spring Harbor Laboratory's yeast course together.

== Career ==
Herskowitz taught at the University of Oregon from 1972 to 1981. In 1981 he moved to the University of California, San Francisco (UCSF), where he headed the Herskowitz lab.

== Research ==
Herskowitz studied the regulatory hierarchy of phage genes, in particular the switch between the lytic cycle and the lysogenic cycle. As a graduate student, Herskowitz made major contributions to the scientific understanding of regulation of gene expression in Lambda phage. Lambda phage was the first organism whose regulatory strategies became well understood, due in part to Herskowitz' pioneering work. The positive regulation of operons by activators was controversial. Herskowitz and Signer (1970) were the first to define a regulatory site in the prophage that controlled a set of late genes. They showed that the expression of bacteriophage lambda's late genes was controlled by the product of the Q gene, late in the life cycle of the virus by the site. A single site in the genome was used by Q to activate all of the late genes, which were transcribed into a single, long messenger RNA. This was one of the earliest examples of positive control of gene expression, and suggested that late gene expression required circularization. Herskowitz further described the products of the N, cII, and cIII genes, positive regulation of cII and cIII, and N's central role as a positive regulator for rightward and leftward transcription in lambda phage.

Herskowitz also worked with Costa Georgopoulos on host genes that control DNA replication and host mutants with virus growth defects. They demonstrated for the first time that functional interactions between genes could be inferred directly using purely genetic arguments. The work showed the broad applicability of the technique of identifying mutants that have lost the ability to carry out a function, followed by second-site mutations that recover the function.

Botstein and Herskowitz (1974) developed a technique for making hybrid phage. They determined the relationship between Salmonella phage P22 and coliphage lambda, and discovered that bacteriophage genomes had a modular structure.

Herskowitz's work on yeast had substantial impact as well. Herskowitz focused on Saccharomyces cerevisiae (baker's yeast) as a model organism. A simplest single-cell organism, it functions in ways similar to a human cell. Saccharomyces cerevisiae became a premier experimental organism for the study of eukaryotic regulation, in part due to Herskowitz's work. Herskowitz is credited with being the first to use a bar sign in a pathway diagram to denote a negative influence as well as popularizing the phrase "the awesome power of yeast genetics".

Yeast cells are comparable of switching between two different types. Herskowitz identified the mechanism of the mating of yeast in homothallic strains, describing it via the "cassette model" metaphor. According to this metaphor, a cell possesses a "library" of "cassettes" with both types of genes. Only one "cassette" can be "played" at a given time and influence cell behavior, but both exist in the library. The "cassette" that is not being "played" is "silent" or "hidden". The cell changes types by putting in a different "cassette", replacing the functional section of genetic information with information from one of the silent copies Work with Janet Kurjan on models for the pheromone response pathway led to identification of genes for mating pheromones and mating type switching. The cassette model became a paradigm for the control of differentiation in eukaryotic regulatory systems. The work revolutionized thinking about gene regulation and showed the importance of plasticity.

Herskowitz used geneticist techniques to study topics in molecular and cell biology. He identified fundamental patterns in eukaryotic cell growth and division. He demonstrated that cells often divide asymmetrically and differ in ways that result in growing differently. His work on polarized growth has shown how cells control their shape and develop buds. Different molecular determinants in progeny cells initiate different programmes of cellular development. Herskowitz also showed that division of yeast cells creates a history of cellular division in the form of molecular marks on the cell's surface. These marks can be used to direct future growth and division. Herskowitz studied many other areas through the mechanisms of yeast mating, including signal transduction, control of the eukaryotic cell-cycle, RNA transport, the role of chromatin in transcription, meiosis, sporulation, gene expression, and how human genetic variation leads to different responses to drugs.

Herskowitz worked with the Annual Review of Genetics and other journals, and was awarded the 1985 NAS Award for Scientific Reviewing of the National Academy of Sciences. Herskowitz received in 1983 the Eli Lilly and Company-Elanco Research Award from the American Society for Microbiology. He was elected to the Institute of Medicine in 2002, the National Academy of Sciences in 1986.

He was an engaging and effective communicator, who often used metaphors to explain complex ideas clearly. He and his brother were both talented musicians, and Herskowitz would sometimes perform his own songs and his brother's composition "The Double-Talking Helix Blues". A recipient of UCSF's Distinguished Teaching Award, he was known for mentoring highly successful students, many of them women.

Herskowitz died in San Francisco, California on April 28, 2003, of pancreatic cancer. James D. Watson said after his passing:

He was one of the people who made U.C.S.F. the most exciting place in the world for a younger scientist to be. A talk by Ira was always fun to listen to. And he approached science with a certain degree of idealism."

== Awards ==
- 1985 NAS Award for Scientific Reviewing of the National Academy of Sciences.
- 1987 MacArthur Fellows Program
- 1988 Genetics Society of America Medal
- 1991 Mendel Medal
- 2002 Thomas Hunt Morgan Medal
- 2002 Lewis S. Rosenstiel Award for Distinguished Work in Basic Medical Research.
