= Allan Jacobson =

Allan S. Jacobson
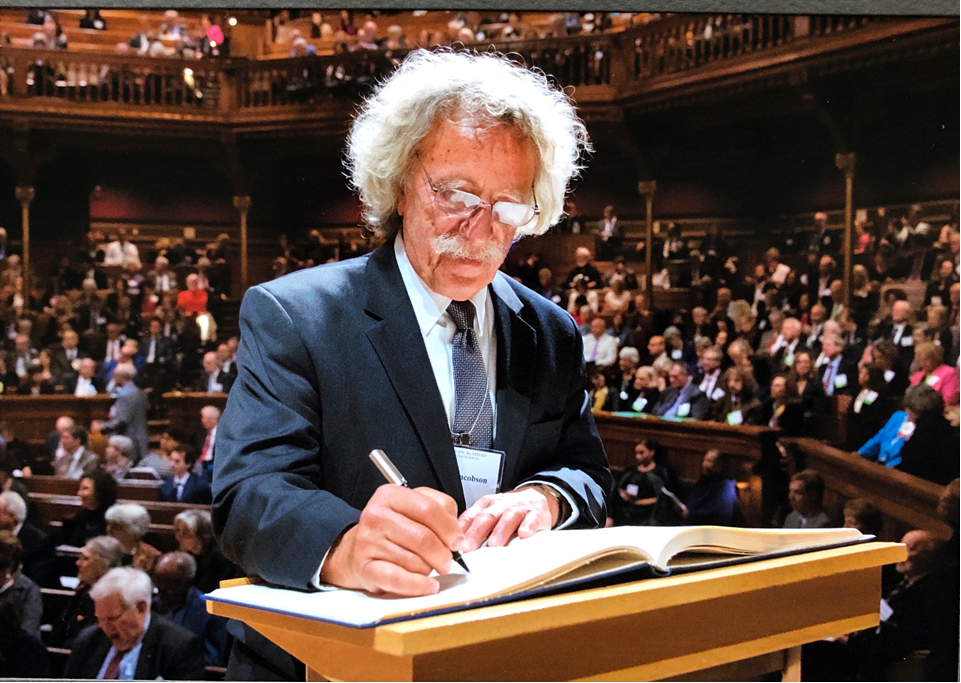
- Jacobson signs the book of members at the American Academy of Arts and Sciences in October 2018
- Education: Queens College (BA); Brandeis University (PhD)
- Known for: Research on messenger RNA stability and nonsense-mediated mRNA decay
- Awards: National Institutes of Health MERIT Award; Fellow of the American Academy of Arts and Sciences; Gruber Prize in Genetics
- Scientific career
- Fields: Molecular genetics, RNA biology
- Workplaces: University of Massachusetts Chan Medical School

Allan S. Jacobson is an American biologist and academic researcher known for his work in molecular genetics and RNA biology, particularly the mechanisms of messenger RNA (mRNA) stability, translation, and nonsense-mediated mRNA decay. He is the Gerald and Zelda Haidak Distinguished Professor of Cell Biology at the University of Massachusetts Chan Medical School, where he served as chair of the Department of Microbiology and Physiological Systems for nearly three decades and currently holds the title of chair emeritus. Jacobson is also a co-founder of the biotechnology company PTC Therapeutics. He is a recipient of the National Institutes of Health MERIT Award and the Gruber Prize in Genetics.

== Education ==
Jacobson graduated from the Bronx High School of Science in 1962 and received a Bachelor of Arts degree in biology from Queens College in 1966. He earned a PhD in biology from Brandeis University in 1971 and completed postdoctoral training at the Massachusetts Institute of Technology.

== Career ==
Jacobson joined the founding faculty of the University of Massachusetts Medical School (now UMass Chan Medical School) in 1973. He served as the Chair of the Department of Microbiology and Physiological Systems for nearly three decades, beginning in 1994. During this tenure, in 2012, he was named the Gerald & Zelda Haidak Distinguished Professor of Cell Biology. He concluded his term as chair in 2023 and was appointed chair emeritus in 2024.

=== PTC Therapeutics ===
In 1998, Jacobson co-founded PTC Therapeutics Inc. with Stuart Peltz. He served as the chairman of the company's Board of Directors from its inception until 2004 and has continued to serve on its board of directors and its Scientific Advisory Board. The company's efforts led to the development of drugs such as ataluren (Translarna), risdiplam (Evrysdi), and sepiapterin (Sephience), all designed to treat specific genetic disorders by respectively promoting "read-through" of premature termination codons, modifying the pre-mRNA splicing mechanism, and lowering blood phenylalanine levels.

== Research ==
Jacobson’s research has focused on post-transcriptional regulation of gene expression, particularly mRNA stability, mechanisms of translation termination, and the function of the poly(A) tail. His work has examined how mRNA structure, translation, and quality-control pathways interact in eukaryotic cells.

Early in his career, Jacobson studied the role of the poly(A)-binding protein in translation initiation and mRNA stability. This research contributed to the development of the closed-loop model of messenger ribonucleoprotein (mRNP) organization, which describes interactions between the 5′ and 3′ ends of mRNA that influence translation and transcript stability.

Jacobson later developed experimental systems in the yeast Saccharomyces cerevisiae to investigate the regulation of mRNA decay. Using these approaches, he sought to understand the molecular basis for the accelerated decay of mRNAs that contain premature termination codons (PTCs). Jacobson identified several genes that regulate this process. and dubbed their collective effect as the nonsense-mediated mRNA decay (NMD) pathway. He characterized endogenous NMD substrates, including pre-mRNAs that enter the cytoplasm, and examined the interactions and mRNA surveillance roles of conserved NMD pathway proteins including UPF1, UPF2, UPF3, and DCP2.

To study the relationship between translation and NMD, Jacobson analyzed translation termination at premature termination codons and proposed the “faux-UTR” model to explain how aberrant termination events can activate NMD. This work contributed to understanding of translational fidelity and mRNA quality control.

In subsequent research, Jacobson examined the molecular basis of nonsense suppression, showing that near-cognate tRNA mispairing at specific codon positions affects suppression efficiency. He also identified sequence contexts that influence translation termination efficiency. He also reported that NMD functions as a probabilistic quality-control mechanism during translation elongation. Additional studies addressed the regulation of mRNA decapping, including interactions between UPF1 and other decapping activators and the DCP1/DCP2 enzyme complex.

Jacobson’s research on translation termination and NMD has informed translational studies in genetic disease, including work contributing to the development of ataluren (Translarna). The compound promotes readthrough of premature stop codons in certain inherited disorders such as Duchenne muscular dystrophy.

== Honors and awards ==
- National Institutes of Health MERIT Award (2005–2015)
- Fellow, American Academy of Microbiology (2011)
- Chancellor's Medal for Distinguished Scholarship, UMass Medical School (2014)
- Dean's Award for Outstanding Contribution to Graduate Education, UMass Medical School (2016)
- Fellow of the American Academy of Arts and Sciences (2018)
- Gruber Prize in Genetics (2023)
