= Lundblad =

Lundblad is a Swedish surname. Notable people with the surname include:

- Janne Lundblad (1887–1940), Swedish Army officer and equestrian
- Peter Lundblad (1950–2015), Swedish singer and songwriter
- Thomas Lundblad (born 1967), Swedish fencer
- Victoria Lundblad, American geneticist
