= Lee Sweeney =

American scientist

H. Lee Sweeney is an American scientist who studies muscle.

== Education and career ==
He received his undergraduate degree in biochemistry from Massachusetts Institute of Technology in 1975 and his PhD from Harvard in physiology and biophysics in 1984. He then spent a year as research instructor in physiology at the University of Texas Southwestern Medical School, and then obtained an appointment as an assistant professor at the University of Texas at Austin.

He joined the faculty of the University of Pennsylvania in 1989, became chair of the department of physiology in 1999, became founding director of the Paul D. Wellstone Muscular Dystrophy Cooperative Research Center in 2005. and eventually obtained an endowed chair and became director of the Penn Center for Orphan Disease Research and Therapy, which was founded in 2012.

He left Penn and joined the faculty of University of Florida College of Medicine in 2015, where he became the Thomas H. Maren M.D. Eminent Scholar Chair in Pharmacology and Therapeutics and became the director of the new Myology Institute there.

== Research ==
In 1998 his lab published work in which they used gene therapy to incorporate an extra copy of IGF1 into muscle cells of young and old mice; age-related muscle aging in the older mice was reversed and both old and mice became stronger. The paper received national press coverage, and the mice became known as "Schwarzenegger mice." He soon started receiving calls from athletes and coaches asking him to use this method for gene doping; he was still receiving inquires as of 2008. He has written on the topic of gene doping in popular media and is often called upon to comment on the topic in the media. Sweeney was awarded Hamdan Award for Medical Research Excellence - Molecular Therapy in Drug Targeting (Pharmacogenomics) in 2008 by Hamdan Medical Award.

Sweeney collaborated with PTC Therapeutics in the discovery and development of ataluren. which was initially funded in part by Parent Project Muscular Dystrophy. Sweeney's lab had published work in 1999 showing that gentamicin could "cure" a rodent model of Duchenne muscular dystrophy and this led to the collaboration with PTC that produced ataluren—Sweeney was the last author on the initial publication of ataluren in Nature in 2007. Ataluren was approved to treat DMD in Europe in 2014.

As of 2012 he had been an author on around 180 papers and reviews that had been cited around 16,000 times.

Along with serving on the scientific advisory board of PTC, he does likewise with Cytokinetics and Solid Biosciences He is also on the scientific advisory board of the Parent Project Muscular Dystrophy.
