= Fossilworks =

Online resource for fossil organisms

- Available in: English
- Creator: John Alroy
- Editor: John Alroy
- Website: www.fossilworks.org
- Launched: 1998; 28 years ago
- Current status: Shut down in c. 2022

Fossilworks was a portal which provides query, download, and analysis tools to facilitate access to the Paleobiology Database, a large relational database assembled by hundreds of paleontologists from around the world.

== History ==
Fossilworks was created in 1998 by John Alroy and housed at Macquarie University. It included many analysis and data visualization tools formerly included in the Paleobiology Database.

Fossilworks was shut down around 2022 and now links to the Paleobiology Database.
