= Spuhler =

Spuhler may refer to:

- Hap Spuhler (1918–1982), American baseball coach
  - Spuhler Field, a baseball field in Fairfax, Virginia named after Hap
- James Spuhler (1917–1992), American anthropologist
- Johnny Spuhler (1917–2007), English footballer
- Peter Spuhler (born 1959), Swiss entrepreneur and politician
- Willy Spühler (1902–1990), Swiss politician
