= Gruber Prize in Genetics =

The Gruber Prize in Genetics
- Awarded for: Groundbreaking contributions to any realm of genetics research
- Location: Yale University Office of Development, New Haven, Connecticut
- Presented by: Gruber Foundation
- Reward: US$500,000
- First award: 2001
- Website: gruber.yale.edu

The Gruber Prize in Genetics, established in 2001, is one of three international awards worth US$500,000 made by the Gruber Foundation, a non-profit organization based at Yale University in New Haven, Connecticut.

The Genetics Prize honors leading scientists for distinguished contributions in any realm of genetics research. The Foundation’s other international prizes are in Cosmology and Neuroscience.

== Recipients ==
- 2001 Rudolf Jaenisch
- 2002 H. Robert Horvitz
- 2003 David Botstein
- 2004 Mary Claire King
- 2005 Robert Hugh Waterston
- 2006 Elizabeth Blackburn, a cell biologist specializing in telomeres
- 2007 Maynard Olson of the University of Washington, a bioinformatics specialist
- 2008 Allan C. Spradling, PhD, of the Carnegie Institution for Science and Howard Hughes Medical Institute (HHMI) in Baltimore; for his work on fruit fly genomics
- 2009 Janet Rowley, MD, the Blum-Riese Distinguished Service Professor at the University of Chicago
- 2010 Gerald Fink, PhD, the Margaret and Herman Sokol Professor at MIT
- 2011 Ronald W. Davis, PhD, Stanford University
- 2012 Douglas C. Wallace, PhD
- 2013 Svante Pääbo, PhD
- 2014 Victor Ambros, PhD, University of Massachusetts; David Baulcombe, PhD, University of Cambridge; and Gary Ruvkun, PhD, Harvard University
- 2015 Emmanuelle Charpentier, Helmholtz Centre for Infection Research in Germany and Jennifer Doudna, University of California, Berkeley
- 2016 Michael Grunstein, University of California, Los Angeles (UCLA) and C. David Allis, Rockefeller University
- 2017 Stephen J. Elledge, Harvard Medical School
- 2018 Joanne Chory (Salk Institute for Biological Studies), and Elliot Meyerowitz (Caltech)
- 2019 Bert Vogelstein (Johns Hopkins Hospital, Howard Hughes Medical Institute)
- 2020 Bonnie Bassler (Princeton University, Howard Hughes Medical Institute)
- 2021 Stuart H. Orkin (Harvard Medical School, Howard Hughes Medical Institute)
- 2022 Ruth Lehmann (Whitehead Institute and MIT), James Priess (Fred Hutchinson Cancer Research Center), and Geraldine Seydoux (Johns Hopkins University School of Medicine).
- 2023 Allan Jacobson (University of Massachusetts Chan Medical School), and Lynne E. Maquat (University of Rochester School of Medicine)
- 2024 Hugo J. Bellen (Baylor College of Medicine BCM)
- 2025 Rotem Sorek (Weizmann Institute of Science in Rehovot, Israel)
- 2026 Alan G. Hinnebusch (National Institutes of Health, USA)

== See also ==
- List of genetics awards
