= Marian Carlson =

Geneticist

- Education: Harvard University, AB; Stanford University, PhD
- Spouse: Stephen P. Goff
- Awards: Member of National Academy of Sciences, Genetics Society of America Medal
- Scientific career
- Fields: Genetics, Biochemistry
- Workplaces: Columbia University; Simons Foundation; Howard Hughes Medical Institute
- Thesis: Satellite DNA and adjacent genes in Drosophila heterochromatin (1978)

Marian Bille Carlson is a geneticist and the Director of Life Sciences at the Simons Foundation. She is a member of the National Academy of Sciences and a past president of the Genetics Society of America.

== Education and career ==
Carlson received her Bachelor of Arts degree from Harvard University. There, she spent a summer working in the laboratory of David Hubel after taking a neurobiology course and decided to become a biologist. She then attended Stanford University where she received a Ph.D. working on satellite DNA in Drosophila melanogaster under the supervision of Douglas Brutlag. She then became a postdoctoral researcher at Massachusetts Institute of Technology, working in the laboratory of David Botstein, where she began to work on yeast genetics and gene regulation.

Carlson became a faculty member at Columbia University College of Physicians & Surgeons in 1981, and was promoted to a professor of genetics and development. In 2008, she took a position at the Howard Hughes Medical Institute before moving to the Simons Foundation in 2010.

Carlson was elected to the Board of the Genetics Society of America in 1994 alongside Eric Lander. In 2001, she became president of the Genetics Society of America.

== Selected publications ==
- Hardie, D. Grahame; Carling, David; Carlson, Marian (1998-06-01). "THE AMP-ACTIVATED/SNF1 PROTEIN KINASE SUBFAMILY: Metabolic Sensors of the Eukaryotic Cell?". Annual Review of Biochemistry. 67 (1): 821–855. doi:10.1146/annurev.biochem.67.1.821. ISSN 0066-4154. PMID 9759505.
- Carlson, Marian; Botstein, David (1982-01-01). "Two differentially regulated mRNAs with different 5′ ends encode secreted and intracellular forms of yeast invertase". Cell. 28 (1): 145–154. doi:10.1016/0092-8674(82)90384-1. ISSN 0092-8674. PMID 7039847. S2CID 7499962.
- Carlson, Marian (1999-04-01). "Glucose repression in yeast". Current Opinion in Microbiology. 2 (2): 202–207. doi:10.1016/S1369-5274(99)80035-6. ISSN 1369-5274. PMID 10322167.

== Awards and honors ==
In 1993, Carlson was named a fellow of the American Association for the Advancement of Science. In 2004, Carlson was named a fellow of the American Academy of Arts and Sciences. In 2009, she was elected a member of the National Academy of Sciences and received the Genetics Society of America Medal. In 2012, Carlson was elected to the American Academy of Microbiology.
