= Bonnie Bassler =

American molecular biologist (born 1962)

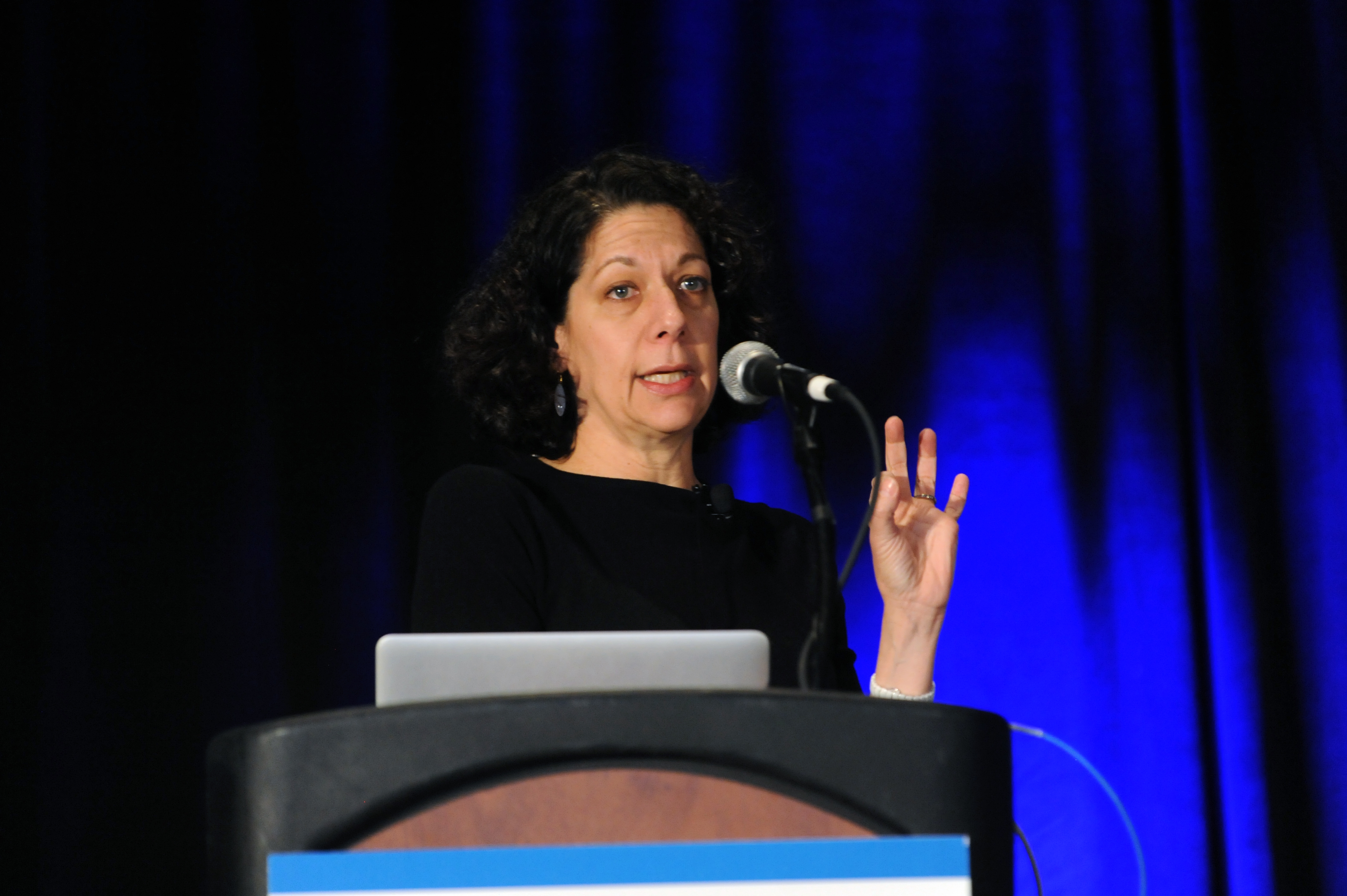
- Bassler at a 2015 American Society for Biochemistry and Molecular Biology meeting.
- Born: Bonnie Lynn Bassler; 1962 (age 63–64); Chicago, Illinois, U.S.
- Education: University of California, Davis; Johns Hopkins University
- Known for: Quorum sensing
- Spouse: Todd Reichart
- Awards: Wiley Prize in Biomedical Science (2009); Richard Lounsbery Award (2011); Shaw Prize (2015); Pearl Meister Greengard Prize (2016); Wolf Prize in Chemistry (2022); Genetics Society of America Medal (2020); Princess of Asturias Award (2023)
- Scientific career
- Workplaces: Princeton University

External videos
- "Quorum sensing: Bacteria talks", Bonnie Bassler, TED2014
- Bonnie Bassler Biography, Explorer's Guide to Biology

Bonnie Lynn Bassler (born 1962) is an American molecular biologist; the Squibb Professor in Molecular Biology and chair of the Department of Molecular Biology at Princeton University; and a Howard Hughes Medical Institute Investigator. She has researched cell-to-cell chemical communication in bacteria and discovered key insights into the mechanism by which bacteria communicate, known as quorum sensing. She has contributed to the idea that disruption of chemical signaling can be used as an antimicrobial therapy.

Bassler has received numerous awards for her research, including the Princess of Asturias Award (2023), Paul Ehrlich and Ludwig Darmstaedter Prize (2021), the Pearl Meister Greengard Prize (2016), the L'Oreal-UNESCO award (2012), the Richard Lounsbery Award (2011), the Wiley Prize in Biomedical Sciences (2009), and a MacArthur Fellowship (2002).

She is an elected member of the National Academy of Sciences (as of 2006), a Foreign Member of the Royal Society (as of 2012), a former president of the American Society for Microbiology (2011) and served on the National Science Board with a term expiring May 10, 2016. She was an editor of the Annual Review of Genetics from 2012 to 2017.

== Early life and education ==
Bassler was born in Chicago and raised in Danville, California. She began her career in science at 13 "as a veterinarian's assistant at the Miami Zoo and later at a local dog and cat clinic."

Bassler entered the University of California, Davis as a major in veterinary sciences, but focused on genetics and biochemistry and received a Bachelor of Science in biochemistry. Bassler worked for UC Davis biochemistry and molecular medicine professor Frederic Troy, who assigned her to a bacteria research project. Within this project, Bassler characterized an enzyme in E. coli which cleaved sugars from various membrane glycoproteins. Bassler has stated that prokaryotes are "the perfect creatures to work on." Bassler attended Johns Hopkins University and received a PhD in biochemistry in 1990.

Her postdoctoral research was conducted at the Agouron Institute in La Jolla, California where she worked with Michael R. Silverman from 1990 to 1994. Silverman was the first to discover quorum sensing, by studying the marine bacterium Vibrio fischeri. The glow-in-the-dark bacteria communicate chemically about their numbers and only give off light when a cohort is large enough to create an effective light source. Bassler determined further that bacteria are "multilingual" and use multiple chemical signal molecules to communicate with each other.

Since then, Bassler has also shown that bacteria use quorum sensing to differentiate self and other, a trait previously thought to be limited to more highly evolved organisms. Bassler has shown that viruses and host cells (such as human cells) as well as bacteria, use quorum sensing, and that the virulence of pathogenic bacteria is in part a result of quorum sensing. Bassler has developed anti-quorum-sensing strategies that, in animal models, halt infection from bacterial pathogens of global significance.

In 1994, Bassler joined the Princeton faculty. She is currently the chair of the department of molecular biology and the Squibb Professor in molecular biology. Her lab at Princeton University researches quorum sensing, the process of cell-cell communication in bacteria.

Bassler's exploration of the ways in which bacteria communicate and behave collectively can be seen as contributing to a paradigm shift in how scientists view the microbial world. Bassler's discoveries are said to "open new vistas in basic science, but are also of practical significance." Bassler's research has contributed new and exciting strategies for treating bacterial disease. In 2002, the MacArthur Foundation awarded Bassler a fellowship in recognition of her contributions to the bacterial lexicon.

== Research ==
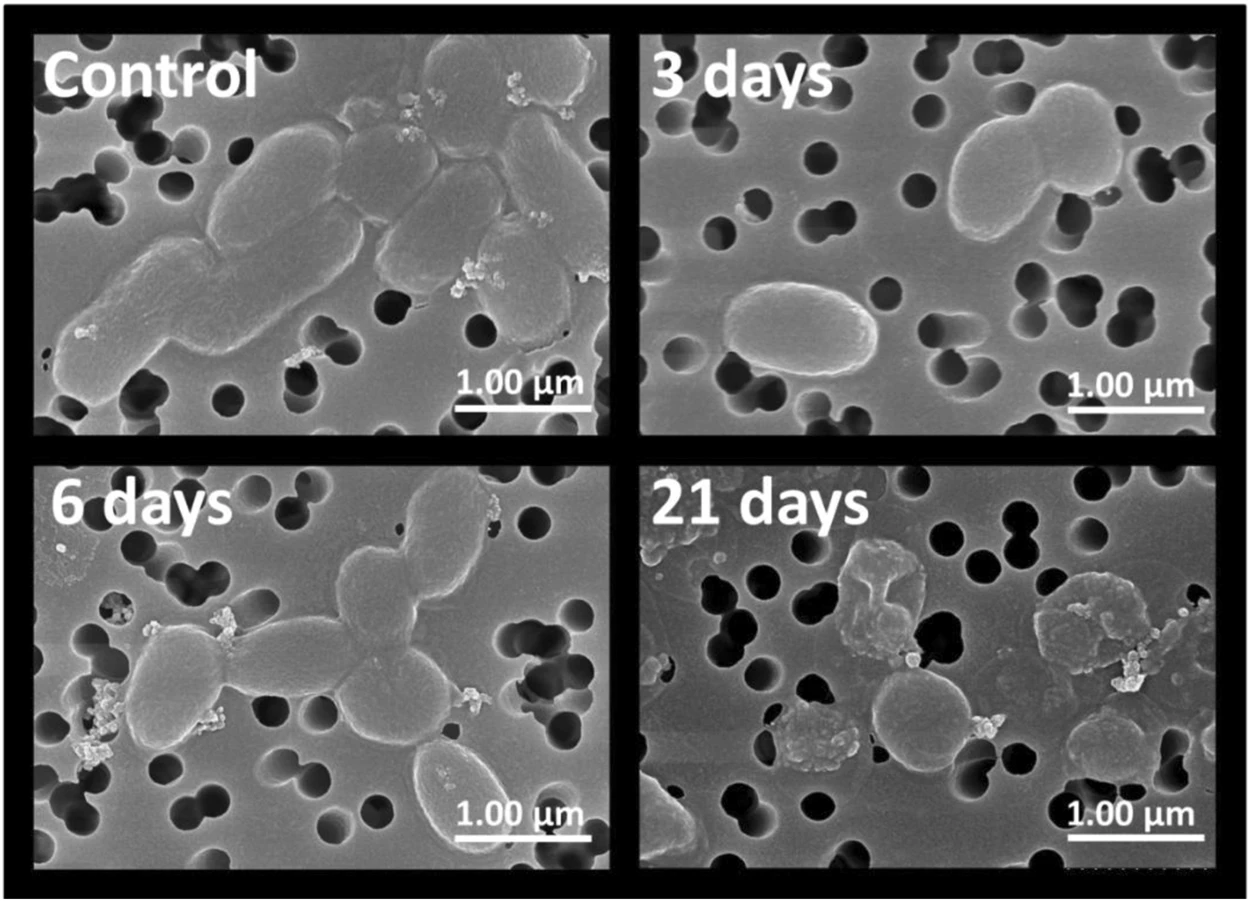
Vibrio harveyi

During her postdoctoral research, Bassler experimented with genetic manipulation of bioluminescent genes in V. harveyi bacteria and discovered that this bacteria had multiple molecules for quorum sensing. She found that these bacteria use quorum sensing to turn on and off a large number of genes in response to communications from other bacteria. These communications and responses allow bacteria of the same species and of different species to cooperate in a similar manner to multi-cellular organisms. She extended this research in a series of experiments leading to the discovery that boron binding is used as a co-factor in communication. Boron is found in abundance in the oceans where V. harveyi is found.

Bassler's lab focuses on intra- and inter-species communication, self versus non-self recognition, information transferring, and population level cooperation. Research topics include: How bacteria distinguish self from other: ligand-receptor interactions, Dynamics: small RNA regulation of quorum sensing, Biofilms under flow and the public goods dilemma, Manipulation of quorum sensing on demand, and microbiome quorum sensing and inter-kingdom communication.

== Awards and honors ==
- 2002 MacArthur Fellowship
- 2004 Elected member of the American Association for the Advancement of Science
- 2006 National Academy of Sciences
- 2007 Fellow of the American Academy of Arts and Sciences
- 2008 Special Recognition from the World Cultural Council
- 2009 Wiley Prize in Biomedical Sciences
- 2010 USA Science and Engineering Festival's Nifty Fifty Speakers, nominated by American Society for Microbiology
- 2010–2016 National Science Board, nominated by President Barack Obama
- 2011 Richard Lounsbery Award
- 2011 L'Oréal-UNESCO For Women in Science Awards Laureate for North America
- 2010–2011 President of the American Society for Microbiology
- 2012 Member in the American Philosophical Society
- 2014 American Society for Microbiology EMD Millipore Alice C. Evans Award
- 2015 Shaw Prize in Life Science and Medicine
- 2016 The FASEB Excellence in Science Award
- 2016 Pearl Meister Greengard Prize
- 2016 Max Planck Research Award
- 2016 Elected member of the National Academy of Medicine
- 2018 Dickson Prize
- 2018 Ernst Schering Prize
- 2020 Genetics Society of America Medal
- 2020 Gruber Prize in Genetics
- 2021 Paul Ehrlich and Ludwig Darmstaedter Prize
- 2022 Wolf Prize in Chemistry.
- 2022 Honorary Doctor of Humane Letters from Johns Hopkins University
- 2023 Canada Gairdner International Award
- 2023 Princess of Asturias Awards
- 2023 Albany Medical Center Prize
- 2025 National Medal of Science
- 2026 Copley Medal of the Royal Society

== Selected works ==
- Ng, Wai-Leung; Bassler, Bonnie L. (December 1, 2009). "Bacterial Quorum-Sensing Network Architectures". Annual Review of Genetics. 43 (1): 197–222. doi:10.1146/annurev-genet-102108-134304. ISSN 0066-4197. PMC 4313539. PMID 19686078.
- Bassler, Bonnie L.; Losick, Richard (April 2006). "Bacterially Speaking". Cell. 125 (2): 237–246. doi:10.1016/j.cell.2006.04.001. ISSN 0092-8674. PMID 16630813. S2CID 17056045.
- Camilli, Andrew; Bassler, Bonnie L. (February 24, 2006). "Bacterial Small-Molecule Signaling Pathways". Science. 311 (5764): 1113–1116. Bibcode:2006Sci...311.1113C. doi:10.1126/science.1121357. ISSN 0036-8075. PMC 2776824. PMID 16497924.
- Waters, Christopher M.; Bassler, Bonnie L. (November 1, 2005). "Quorum sensing: Cell-to-Cell Communication in Bacteria". Annual Review of Cell and Developmental Biology. 21 (1): 319–346. doi:10.1146/annurev.cellbio.21.012704.131001. ISSN 1081-0706. PMID 16212498.
- Lenz, Derrick H.; Mok, Kenny C.; Lilley, Brendan N.; Kulkarni, Rahul V.; Wingreen, Ned S.; Bassler, Bonnie L. (July 9, 2004). "The Small RNA Chaperone Hfq and Multiple Small RNAs Control Quorum Sensing in Vibrio harveyi and Vibrio cholerae". Cell. 118 (1): 69–82. doi:10.1016/j.cell.2004.06.009. ISSN 0092-8674. PMID 15242645. S2CID 18997499.
- Chen, Xin; Schauder, Stephan; Potier, Noelle; Van Dorsselaer, Alain; Pelczer, István; Bassler, Bonnie L.; Hughson, Frederick M. (January 2002). "Structural identification of a bacterial quorum-sensing signal containing boron". Nature. 415 (6871): 545–549. doi:10.1038/415545a. ISSN 0028-0836. PMID 11823863. S2CID 4334017.
- Miller, Melissa B.; Bassler, Bonnie L. (October 1, 2001). "Quorum Sensing in Bacteria". Annual Review of Microbiology. 55 (1): 165–199. doi:10.1146/annurev.micro.55.1.165. ISSN 0066-4227. PMID 11544353.
- Schauder, Stephan; Shokat, Kevan; Surette, Michael G.; Bassler, Bonnie L. (December 21, 2001). "The LuxS family of bacterial autoinducers: biosynthesis of a novel quorum-sensing signal molecule". Molecular Microbiology. 41 (2): 463–476. doi:10.1046/j.1365-2958.2001.02532.x. ISSN 0950-382X. PMID 11489131. S2CID 24852124.
- Surette, Michael G.; Miller, Melissa B.; Bassler, Bonnie L. (February 16, 1999). "Quorum sensing in Escherichia coli, Salmonella typhimurium, and Vibrio harveyi: A new family of genes responsible for autoinducer production". Proceedings of the National Academy of Sciences. 96 (4): 1639–1644. Bibcode:1999PNAS...96.1639S. doi:10.1073/pnas.96.4.1639. ISSN 0027-8424. PMC 15544. PMID 9990077.
- Bassler, Bonnie L (December 1999). "How bacteria talk to each other: regulation of gene expression by quorum sensing". Current Opinion in Microbiology. 2 (6): 582–587. doi:10.1016/s1369-5274(99)00025-9. ISSN 1369-5274. PMID 10607620.
- Bassler, Bonnie L.; Wright, Miriam; Silverman, Michael R. (July 1994). "Multiple signalling systems controlling expression of luminescence in Vibrio harveyi : sequence and function of genes encoding a second sensory pathway". Molecular Microbiology. 13 (2): 273–286. doi:10.1111/J.1365-2958.1994.Tb00422.X. PMID 7984107. S2CID 39587138.
- Bassler, Bonnie L.; Wright, Miriam; Showalter, Richard E.; Silverman, Michael R. (August 1993). "Intercellular signalling in Vibrio harveyi: sequence and function of genes regulating expression of luminescence". Molecular Microbiology. 9 (4): 773–786. doi:10.1111/j.1365-2958.1993.tb01737.x. ISSN 0950-382X. PMID 8231809. S2CID 36357210.
