= Geraldine Seydoux =

American biologist

- Born: June 18, 1964 (age 62); Paris, France
- Education: University of Maine, Orono; Princeton University
- Scientific career
- Fields: genetics, embryogenesis
- Workplaces: Johns Hopkins University

Geraldine C. Seydoux (born 1964 in Paris, France) is a Professor of Molecular Biology and Genetics (1995–present), the Huntington Sheldon Professor in Medical Discovery (2015–present), and the Vice Dean for Basic Research (2017–present) at Johns Hopkins University. She is also a Howard Hughes Medical Institute Investigator. In 2002, Discover magazine recognized her as one of the 50 most important women in science.

== Education ==
Seydoux received a B.Sc. from the University of Maine, Orono in 1986. She graduated from Princeton University with a Ph.D. in 1991, and did post-doctoral training at the Carnegie Institution before joining Johns Hopkins University in 1995.

== Research ==
Seydoux's work has focused on the earliest stages of embryogenesis and how single-celled eggs develop into multicellular embryos. The Seydoux lab attempts to determine the process by which embryonic development and polarization are activated. Seydoux studies Caenorhabditis elegans to examine how embryos choose between soma and germline. She was able to demonstrate that the synthesis of mRNA must be globally inhibited prior to the establishment of the germline. Seydoux has also confirmed that proteins in a fertilizing sperm trigger the reorganization of structural proteins inside the ovum. This is an essential step towards the anterior-posterior polarization of the one celled embryo. Geraldine Seydoux's studies provide much insight into the creation of a fully formed multicellular organism from a single cell.

== Awards ==
- 2022, Gruber Prize in Genetics
- 2019, Harvey Lecture
- 2018, Kuggie Vallee Distinguished Lecturer
- 2016, elected to the National Academy of Sciences
- 2013, elected to the American Academy of Arts and Sciences
- 2001, Kirsch Investigator
- 2001, MacArthur Fellows Program
- 1997, Searle Scholar
- 1996, Fellow, David and Lucile Packard Foundation
