= Pearl Meister Greengard Prize =

The Pearl Meister Greengard Prize
- Awarded for: Accomplishments of outstanding women scientists.
- Country: United States
- Presented by: The Rockefeller University
- First award: 2004
- Website: Pearl Meister Greengard Prize

The Pearl Meister Greengard Prize is an award for women scientists in biology given annually by the Rockefeller University.

The Prize was founded by Nobel laureate Paul Greengard and his wife Ursula von Rydingsvard in honor of Greengard's mother, Pearl Meister Greengard, who died giving birth to him. Greengard began funding the award in 1998. Greengard donated the full share of his 2000 Nobel Prize to the fund, and was able to use his new publicity to attract additional funding for the award, which was launched in 2004. The award is meant to shine a spotlight on exceptional female scientists, since, as Greengard observed, "[women] are not yet receiving awards and honors at a level commensurate with their achievements."

The award includes a $100,000 honorarium (previously $50,000).

Three recipients of the Prize, Carol Greider, Elizabeth Blackburn and Katalin Karikó, have gone on to receive the Nobel Prize in Physiology or Medicine. One recipient, Jennifer Doudna, received the Nobel Prize in Chemistry.

== Winners ==
Source: Rockefeller University

- Nicole Marthe Le Douarin (2004)
- Philippa Marrack (2005)
- Mary Frances Lyon (2006)
- Gail R. Martin, Beatrice Mintz, Elizabeth Robertson (2007)
- Elizabeth Blackburn, Carol Greider, Vicki Lundblad (2008)
- Suzanne Cory (2009)
- Janet Rowley and Mary-Claire King (2010)
- Brenda Milner (2011)
- Joan Steitz (2012)
- Huda Y. Zoghbi (2013)
- Lucy Shapiro (2014)
- Helen Hobbs (2015)
- Bonnie Bassler (2016)
- JoAnne Stubbe (2017)
- Jennifer Doudna (2018)
- Xiaowei Zhuang (2019)
- Joanne Chory (2020)
- Pamela Björkman (2021)
- Katalin Karikó (2022)
- Lily Jan, Eve Marder (2023)
- Svetlana Mojsov (2024)
- Maria Jasin (2025)

== See also ==
- List of prizes, medals, and awards for women in science
- List of biology awards
