= Annual Review of Genetics =

- Discipline: Genetics
- Language: English
- Edited by: Tatjana Piotrowski

Publication details
- History: 1967–present, 59 years old
- Publisher: Annual Reviews (US)
- Frequency: Annually
- Open access: Subscribe to Open
- Impact factor: 9.1 (2025)

Standard abbreviations
- ISO 4: Annu. Rev. Genet.

Indexing
- CODEN: ARVGB
- ISSN: 0066-4197 (print); 1545-2948 (web)
- LCCN: 67-29891
- OCLC no.: 41333387

Links
- Journal homepage

The Annual Review of Genetics is an annual peer-reviewed scientific review journal published by Annual Reviews (AR). It was established in 1967 and covers all topics related to the genetics of viruses, bacteria, fungi, plants, and animals, including humans. The current editor is Tatjana Piotrowski. As of 2023, it is being published as open access, under the Subscribe to Open model. As of 2026, Journal Citation Reports gives the journal a 2025 impact factor of 9.1, ranking it eleventh out of 192 journals in the category "Genetics & Heredity".

== History ==
Annual Reviews (AR) is a nonprofit organization whose stated mission is to synthesize knowledge "for the progress of science and the benefit of society." In 1965, AR surveyed geneticists to determine if there was a need for an annual journal that published review articles about recent developments in the field of genetics. Responses to the survey were favorable, with the first volume of the Annual Review of Genetics being published two years later in 1967. Its inaugural editor was Herschel L. Roman. As of 2020, it was published both in print and electronically.

== Scope and indexing ==
It defines its scope as covering various aspects of genetics, including molecular, cell, and developmental biology; behavioral genetics, population genetics, chromosome structure and transmission, gene function and expression, mutation and DNA repair, genomics, and immunogenetics. Various organisms are considered, including viruses, bacteria, fungi, plants, and animals. It is abstracted and indexed in Scopus, Science Citation Index Expanded, MEDLINE, Embase, and Academic Search, among others.

== Editorial processes ==
The Annual Review of Genetics is helmed by the editor or the co-editors. The editor is assisted by the editorial committee, which includes associate editors, regular members, and occasionally guest editors. Guest members participate at the invitation of the editor, and serve terms of one year. All other members of the editorial committee are appointed by the AR board of directors and serve five-year terms. The editorial committee determines which topics should be included in each volume and solicits reviews from qualified authors. Unsolicited manuscripts are not accepted. Peer review of accepted manuscripts is undertaken by the editorial committee.

=== Editors of volumes ===
Dates indicate publication years in which someone was credited as a lead editor or co-editor of a journal volume. The planning process for a volume begins well before the volume appears, so appointment to the position of lead editor generally occurred prior to the first year shown here. An editor who has retired or died may be credited as a lead editor of a volume that they helped to plan, even if it is published after their retirement or death.

- Herschel L. Roman (1967–1984)
- Allan M. Campbell (1985–2011; announced retirement as of 2010, credited as editor for 2011)
- Campbell and Bonnie Bassler (appointed as of 2011; credited as co-editors for 2012)
- Bonnie Bassler (2013–2017)
- Nancy M. Bonini (2018–2021)
- Tatjana Piotrowski (2022-)

=== Current editorial committee ===
As of 2022, the editorial committee consists of the editor and the following members:

- Dominique C. Bergmann
- Francesca Cole
- Harmit S. Malik
- Peter Scheiffele
- John C. Schimenti
- Jeff Sekelsky
- Gisela Storz

As of 2022, it was composed by:

- Andrew G. Clark
- Dominique C. Bergmann
- Zemer Gitai
- Peter Scheiffele
- John C. Schimenti
- Jeff Sekelsky
- Gisela Storz
- Junying Yuan
