= Martha Constantine-Paton =

American neuroscientist

Martha Constantine-Paton is a neuroscientist at the Massachusetts Institute of Technology. She is a member of the McGovern Institute for Brain Research and a professor in the Department of Brain and Cognitive Sciences.

== Overview ==
Prior to joining MIT in 1999 she held faculty appointments at Princeton from 1976-1984 and at Yale from 1985-1999. In 1976, Dr. Constantine-Paton earned her Ph.D from Cornell University. She is an expert on synaptic plasticity and brain development, particularly visual development. She is known for her studies on three-eyed frogs, a demonstration of neural plasticity in which a third eye grafted into a developing tadpole produces a pattern of overlapping connections that resemble mammalian ocular dominance columns. Using this system, she and her colleagues demonstrated the importance of NMDA receptors in development plasticity.

She currently studies the molecular mechanisms that underlie the brain's response to visual experience. Her work is also relevant to understanding the mechanisms of schizophrenia and amyotrophic lateral sclerosis (Lou Gehrig's disease).

== Personal life ==
She is married to Nobel laureate H. Robert Horvitz.
