= Tatjana Piotrowski =

German molecular geneticist

- Born: 1968 (age 56–57); Herrenberg, Germany
- Education: University of San Francisco; University of Tübingen; Max Planck Institute for Developmental Biology
- Partner: Alejandro Sánchez Alvarado
- Children: 2
- Scientific career
- Institutions: University of Utah School of Medicine; Stowers Institute for Medical Research

Tatjana Piotrowski (born 1968) is a German molecular geneticist who researches zebrafish as models of vertebrate development. She has worked at Stowers Institute for Medical Research since 2011 and is editor of the Annual Review of Genetics.

== Early life and education ==
Tatjana Piotrowski grew up in Herrenberg, Germany which is near the Black Forest. She credits her upbringing near the forest for her interest in life sciences, and knew from the time she was in high school that she wanted to study zoology or animal behavior. She lived for a year in San Francisco as an au pair, where she simultaneously enrolled at the University of San Francisco to take classes in biology and geology. She attended the University of Tübingen, where she graduated with a bachelor's degree in biology and a master's degree in zoology. Her master's thesis research on the evolution and anatomy of nervous systems in fish, using the zebrafish as a model organism, was conducted at the University of California, San Diego. After completing her PhD at Max Planck Institute for Developmental Biology in Christiane Nüsslein-Volhard's laboratory, she returned to the US for a research fellowship at the National Institutes of Health's Laboratory of Molecular Genetics in Maryland.

== Career ==
Tatjana Piotrowski was employed at University of Utah School of Medicine as an associate professor in the Department of Neurobiology and Anatomy before accepting a position at the Stowers Institute for Medical Research in 2011. Her more recent research is on the zebrafish lateral line, which is a sensory organ. She researches mechanisms that allow the regeneration of hair cells in the lateral line of zebrafish. Her research on hair cells has the potential to function as a model for reversing hearing loss in mammals, including humans. In 2022 Piotrowski succeeded Nancy Bonini as editor of the Annual Review of Genetics.

== Personal life ==
She is married to Alejandro Sánchez Alvarado, who is also a scientist at the Stowers Institute for Medical Research. They have two children.
