= Elaine Ostrander =

American geneticist

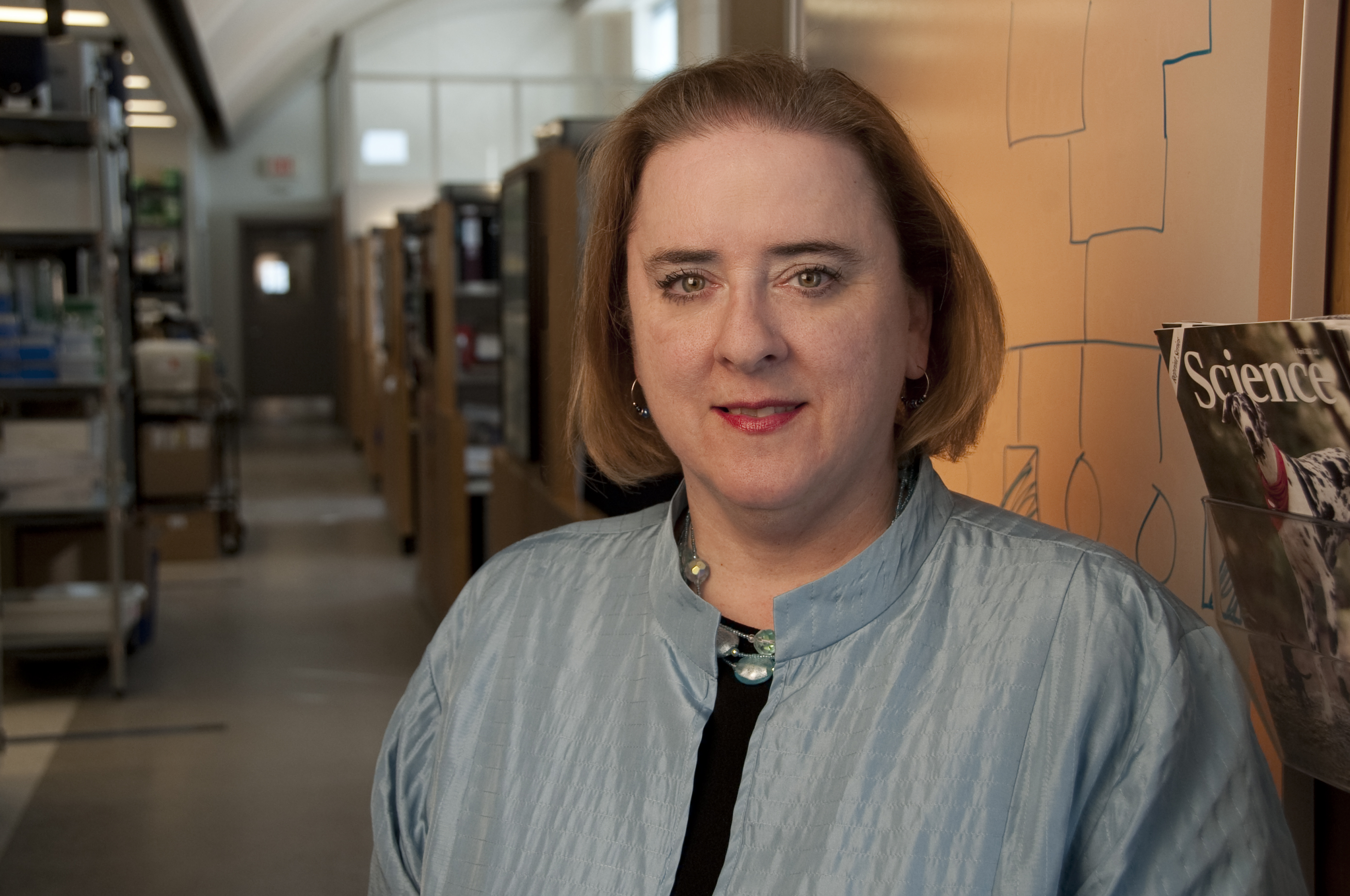
- Born: 1958 (age 67–68); Syracuse, New York
- Education: Oregon Health & Science University; University of Washington; Harvard University
- Known for: Research on prostate cancer Conducting genetic investigations with the canis familiaris, the domestic dog model
- Awards: Fellow at the American Association for the Advancement of Science (2013); Elected to the National Academy of Sciences (2019); Lifetime Achievement Award from the American Kennel Club; 2013 Genetics Society of America Medal
- Scientific career
- Fields: Genetics; Genomics; Cancer Biology
- Workplaces: National Institutes of Health; National Human Genome Research Institute

Elaine Ann Ostrander is an American geneticist at the National Human Genome Research Institute (NHGRI) of the National Institutes of Health (NIH) in Bethesda, Maryland. She holds a number of professional academic appointments, currently serving as Distinguished and Senior Investigator and head of the NHGRI Section of Comparative Genomics; and Chief of the Cancer Genetics and Comparative Genomics Branch. She is known for her research on prostate cancer susceptibility in humans and for conducting genetic investigations with the Canis familiaris —the domestic dog— model, which she has used to study disease susceptibility and frequency and other aspects of natural variation across mammals. In 2007, her laboratory showed that much of the variation in body size of domestic dogs is due to sequence changes in a single gene encoding a growth-promoting protein.

== Early life ==
Ostrander was born in Syracuse, New York in 1958. Her father was a librarian and her mother was a school administrator. The family lived in New York, New Jersey, Nebraska, and then Washington. She has a sister and a brother, marine biologist Gary Ostrander. She attended high school at Eisenhower High School (Yakima, Washington).

== Education ==
Ostrander received her Bachelor of Science degree from the University of Washington in Seattle. In 1987, she was awarded a Ph.D. from the Oregon Health Sciences University (now known as the Oregon Health & Science University) in Portland. She completed post-doctoral training in molecular biology at Harvard. From 1991–1993, she was a staff scientist in the Genetics and Human Genome Project at Lawrence Berkeley National Laboratory in Berkeley, California. At Berkeley, she worked in the laboratory of Jasper Rine, where the dog genome project originated.

== Career ==
Ostrander did her postdoctoral training at Harvard University in Cambridge, Massachusetts. She then went to the University of California, Berkeley, and the Lawrence Berkeley National Labs. There, she began the canine genome project and, with collaborators, built the canine linkage and radiation hybrid maps. She also wrote the white paper arguing for the genome sequencing of the domestic dog. Ostrander also held academic appointments at the Fred Hutchinson Cancer Research Center in Seattle, Washington and the University of Washington for 12 years, where she rose to the rank of Member in the Human Biology and Clinical Research Divisions and head of the Genetics Program.

She came to the NIH in 2004. At NHGRI, she holds a number of professional academic appointments, serving as Distinguished Investigator, Senior Scientist and Head of the Section of Comparative Genetics, and Chief of the Cancer Genetics and Comparative Genomics Branch. She has been an NCI, DOD, DOE and NHGRI grant recipient.

Ostrander has served on the faculty of a number of leading biomedical research institutions, including the Fred Hutchinson Cancer Research Center in Seattle, Washington; the University of Washington in Seattle, and NHGRI in Bethesda, Maryland. She is also affiliated as a mentor in the human genetics pre-doctoral training program at The Johns Hopkins University School of Medicine in Baltimore. Her professional academic responsibilities continue to include a number of leadership roles in planning, research, peer review, and tenure and promotion efforts at a number of scientific institutions, including NHGRI; The Johns Hopkins University School of Medicine; and the Fred Hutchinson Cancer Research Center in Seattle, Washington. At the National and International level, her leadership roles include a seat on the Scientific Advisory Board of the Fanconi Anemia Research Fund, the American Society of Human Genetics Board of Directors and Program Committees, the American Genetic Association Council, the Faculty of 1000, and many others. In addition, she currently oversees admissions for the NIH-Oxford Cambridge Scholars Program.

=== The NHGRI Dog Genome Project ===
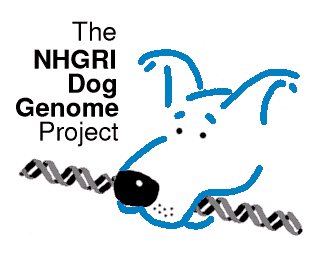

The primary goal of this project is to develop and apply the necessary resources for the identification and study of canine genes. This will aid in an international effort to use the dog system as a model for genetics and genomics, with a special application to cancer research. Other objectives include finding genes responsible for breed-specific diseases that can inform the genetics of similar diseases in humans. Using this information, scientists hope to improve animal health while achieving a greater understanding of the genetic variants associated with human diseases.

The Ostrander lab has generated whole genome sequence data for dozens of dog breeds. She has used that and related data from 175 dog breeds to understand why dog breeds behave and look differently. Using this large and now public data set, the Ostrander lab attempts understanding of the underlying patterns of genetic information that occurs between different breeds of dogs, in both healthy and disease states.

Ostrander leads an international team of researchers, technicians, veterinarians, population geneticists, molecular biologists, statisticians, and computer scientists to accomplish her goals.

Previous trainees from the lab have gone on to become professors at educational institutions, entrepreneurs, teachers, and science policy experts. Thus far, Ostrander's group has been able to map genes that regulate variations seen in body size, leg length, skull shape, and fur type across breeds, with many of these findings published in journals. Many of these genes are important regulators of growth, and help explain the 40-fold difference in body size observed between large and small breeds.

Disease-related research is done by collecting DNA in the form of blood samples from specific purebred, registered dogs. Health histories and pedigrees are also collected as well. Over time, diseases may emerge in the dogs that can be compared to the human equivalent. The group have been able to identify genes linked to retinitis pigmentosum, epilepsy, kidney cancer, soft tissue sarcomas and squamous cell cancers. These results have been published in both human and veterinary literature, as the genetic underpinnings of canine genetics informs the same disease found in humans. The genes causing the disease in dogs are the same ones causing the disease in humans.

Recently, Ostrander has undertaken a large study aimed at understanding how the nearly 500 breeds which exist worldwide were each formed, and how they relate to one another. This work has revealed secrets of early breed formation as well as new findings regarding human population migration. In 2019 she published the analysis of 722 canine whole genome sequences, looking at 144 modern breeds, 54 wild canids and 100 village dogs. This documented over 91 million SNPs and small indels, creating a large catalog of genomic variation for the species.

== Honors ==
Ostrander has presented her research at national and international scientific meetings, as well as given many distinguished named lectures. In 2011, she was named NIH Distinguished Investigator. She is the author of nearly 350 scientific publications that have been cited more than 18,000 times, including more than 1,200 citations to the 2005 paper she co-authored describing the genome sequence of the domestic dog.

In 1999, Ostrander was awarded the President's Award by the American Kennel Club Canine Health Foundation, followed by the AKC Canine Health Foundation Asa Mays Award for Excellence in Canine Health Research (2005) and, in 2013, she was the Lifetime Achievement Winner of the International Canine Health Award. She is also the recipient of the Burroughs Wellcome Fund Innovation Award in Functional Genomics (2000) and the Lifetime Achievement Award from Weill Cornell Medical College's Prostate Cancer Institute (2011). In 2013, she won the Genetics Society of America Medal in recognition of her research on the genetic basis of phenotypic variation between dog breeds and on genome-wide associations in human cancers. She was also the recipient of the NIH Oxford Cambridge Scholars Mentorship Award in 2017.

Ostrander has also served in an advisory capacity on behalf of leading professional societies, journals, and other scientific efforts in the United States, Belgium, Sweden, and others. Ostrander is a member of the American Association for the Advancement of Science (AAAS) and, in 2013, she was inducted as a Fellow. She is a member of the American Society of Human Genetics, the American Genetic Association, the American Association for Cancer Research, Women in Cancer Research, the Genetics Society of America, and the Association for Women in Science. Ostrander served a term on the board of directors of the American Society of Human Genetics and in 2013 received the Genetics Society of America medal.

She was elected to the National Academy of Sciences in 2019.

=== Patents ===
Ostrander holds a U.S. patent: Application 20100217534 Patent Number (20110224911), related to genetic identification of dog breeds.
