= Maynard Olson =

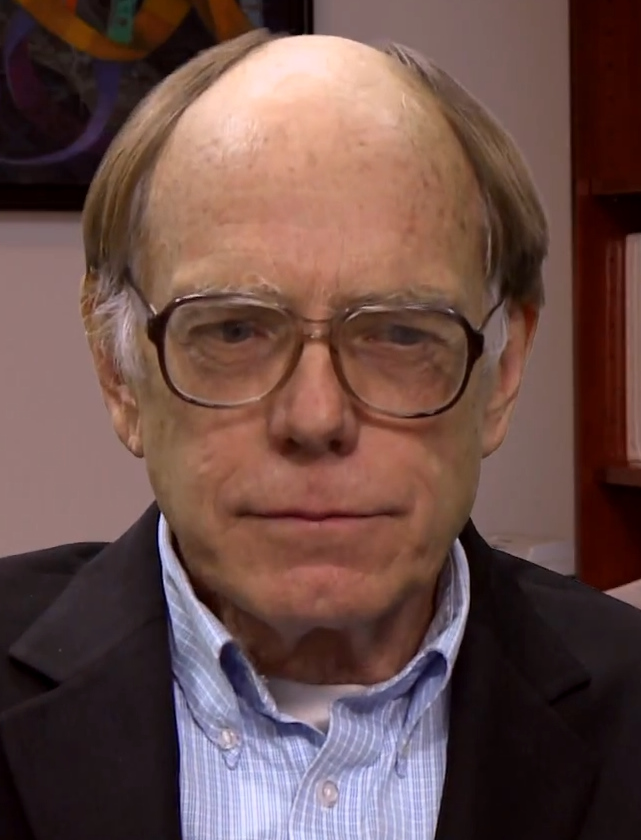
- Maynard Olson in 2017
- Born: October 2, 1943 (age 83); Bethesda, Maryland
- Education: California Institute of Technology (Caltech), Stanford University (Ph.D. 1970)
- Known for: Mapping the genome of Pseudomonas aeruginosa
- Awards: Genetics Society of America Medal, Canada Gairdner International Award, Gruber Prize in Genetics
- Scientific career
- Fields: Chemistry, molecular biology
- Workplaces: Dartmouth College, University of Washington, Washington University in St. Louis

Maynard Victor Olson is an American chemist and molecular biologist. As a professor of genomics and medicine at the University of Washington, he became a specialist in the genetics of cystic fibrosis, and one of the founders of the Human Genome Project. During his years at Washington University in St. Louis, he also led efforts to develop yeast artificial chromosomes that allowed for the study of large portions of the human genome.

== Early life and education ==
Olson was born and raised in Bethesda, Maryland, where he was educated through their public school system. Upon graduating from high school, he received his undergraduate degree from California Institute of Technology (Caltech) and his doctoral degree in inorganic chemistry from Stanford University in 1970. During his time at Caltech, he attended lectures by Richard Feynman which he said was a "memorable experience."

== Career ==
Upon graduating with his PhD, Olson worked at Dartmouth College as an inorganic chemist but experienced "an early mid-life crisis" and chose to change fields. Olsen decided to begin work on genomics in the 1970s, after reading Molecular Biology of the Gene, by James Watson. He subsequently took a sabbatical and worked with Benjamin Hall at the University of Washington (UW) in Seattle. In 1979, he accepted a position at Washington University in St. Louis, where he began to work on the development of systematic approaches to the analysis of complex genomes. Throughout the 1980s, Olson continued to analyze whole genomes in his own laboratory. He worked with a computer developing algorithms for parallel genome mapping projects through yeast while John Sulston focused on nematode worm, Caenorhabditis elegans. This was one of the first uses of restriction fragment length polymorphisms to map a cloned gene. In 1989, Olson became a member of the Program Advisory Committee on the Human Genome at the National Institutes of Health (NIH).

At the beginning of the following decade, Olson was the recipient of the 1992 Genetics Society of America Medal for his genetic achievements. During the same year, he returned to UW and joined their Department of Molecular Biotechnology. In 1994, Olson was elected to the United States National Academy of Sciences. At the turn of the century, Olson was a lead scientist on a study mapping the genome of Pseudomonas aeruginosa which was published in Nature. The implications of this study led to the possibility of new treatments for patients with cystic fibrosis and patients with severe burns and others who develop this type of infection. As a result of his pioneering gene research, he was the co-recipient of Durham, North Carolina's City of Medicine Award. The citation specifically noted that without his discovery, sequencing the human genome "would not have been possible." In 2003, Olson was elected to the American Academy of Arts and Sciences for "developing technological and experimental innovations critical to genome sequencing." He was elected to the American Philosophical Society in 2005. He was also the recipient of the 2002 Canada Gairdner International Award and 2007 Gruber Prize in Genetics.

Olson retired from his position in 2008.
