= Genetics Society of America Medal =

- Awarded for: outstanding contributions to the field of genetics in the last 15 years
- Date: 1981
- Country: United States
- Presented by: Genetics Society of America
- Website: www.genetics-gsa.org/awards/gsa_medal.shtml

The Genetics Society of American Medal is a medal awarded by the Genetics Society of America for outstanding contributions to the field of genetics in the last 15 years.

The Medal was established by the society in 1981 and recognizes members who have made recent contributions to the field.

== Award recipients ==
Source: Genetics Society of America

- 2025 Noah Whiteman
- 2024 Luciano Marraffini
- 2023 -
- 2022 Margaret Fuller, Stanford University School of Medicine
- 2021 Douglas Koshland
- 2020 Bonnie Bassler, Princeton University
- 2019 Anne Villeneuve
- 2018 Mariana Wolfner
- 2017 David Kingsley
- 2016 Detlef Weigel
- 2015 Steven Henikoff
- 2014 Angelika B. Amon
- 2013 Elaine Ostrander
- 2012 Joanne Chory
- 2011 John Carlson
- 2010 Barbara J. Meyer
- 2009 Marian Carlson
- 2008 Susan Lindquist
- 2007 Shirley M. Tilghman
- 2006 Victor Ambros
- 2005 Stephen J. Elledge
- 2004 Trudy F. Mackay
- 2003 Jeffrey C. Hall
- 2002 Andrew Z. Fire (Nobel Prize in Physiology or Medicine)
- 2001 H. Robert Horvitz (Nobel Prize in Physiology or Medicine)
- 2000 Jack W. Szostak (Nobel Prize in Physiology or Medicine)
- 1999 Charles H. Langley
- 1998 Ronald W. Davis
- 1997 Christine Guthrie
- 1996 Elliot Meyerowitz
- 1995 Eric F. Wieschaus (Nobel Prize in Physiology or Medicine)
- 1994 Leland H. Hartwell (Nobel Prize in Physiology or Medicine)
- 1993 Jonathan R. Beckwith
- 1992 Maynard V. Olson
- 1991 Bruce S. Baker
- 1990 Nancy Kleckner
- 1989 Allan C. Spradling
- 1988 David Botstein and Ira Herskowitz
- 1987 Sydney Brenner (Nobel Prize in Physiology or Medicine)
- 1986 Gerald Rubin
- 1985 Philip Leder
- 1984 David S. Hogness
- 1983 Charles Yanofsky
- 1982 Gerald R. Fink
- 1981 Beatrice Mintz

== See also ==
- List of genetics awards
