= Joanne Chory =

American plant biologist (1955–2024)

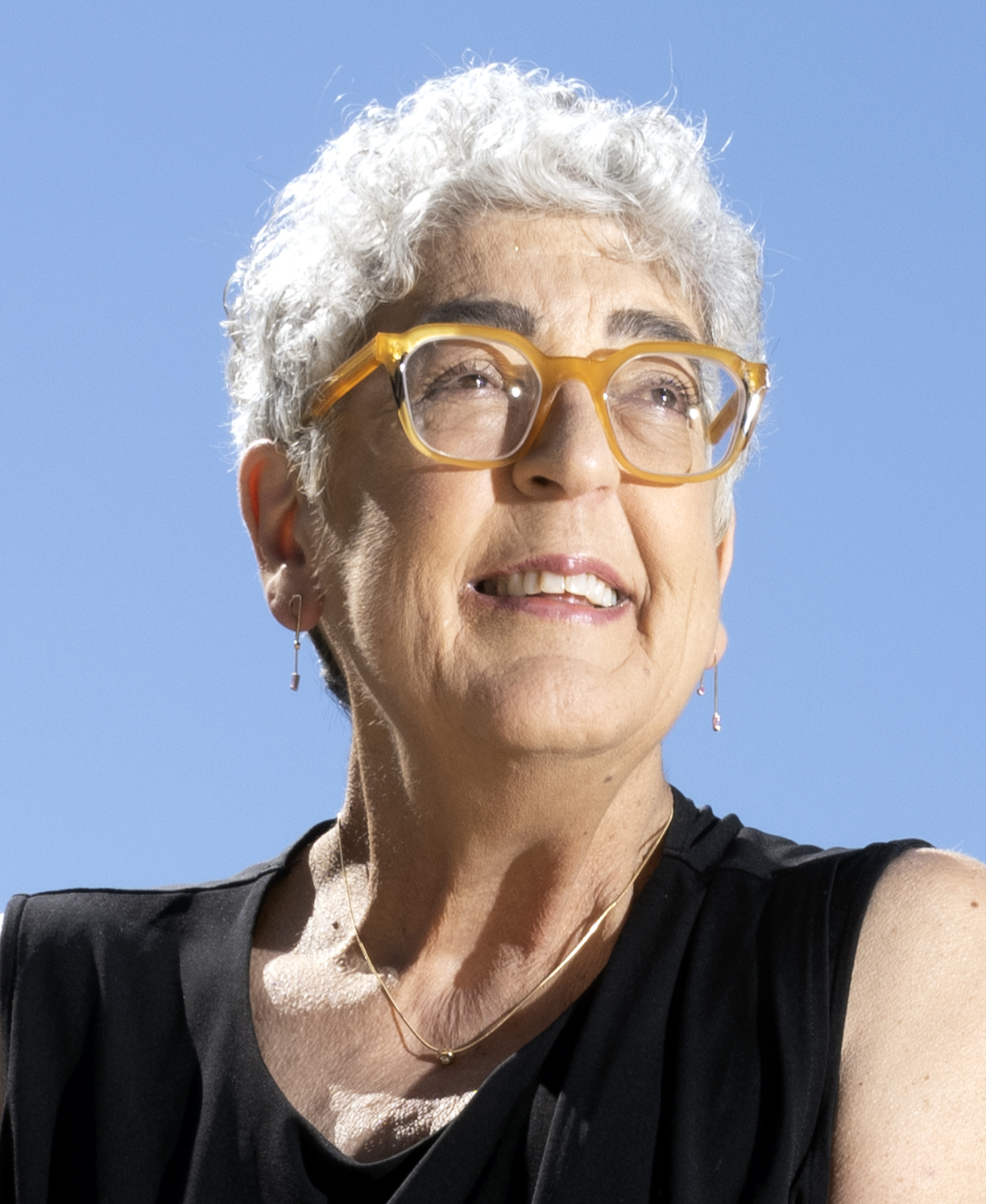
- Chory in 2022
- Born: March 19, 1955; Boston, Massachusetts, U.S.
- Died: November 12, 2024 (aged 69); La Jolla, California, U.S.
- Education: Oberlin College (BS, Biology); University of Illinois, Urbana–Champaign (PhD, Microbiology)
- Known for: Plant hormone biology, retrograde signaling, photobiology
- Awards: Genetics Society of America Medal (2012); Kumho Award in Plant Molecular Biology (2004); Scientific American 50: Research Leader in Agriculture (2003); L'Oreal-UNESCO Award for Women in Science (2000); American Society of Plant Biologists, Charles Albert Schull Award (1995); Breakthrough Prize in Life Sciences (2018); Gruber Prize in Genetics (2018); Princess of Asturias Award (2019); Benjamin Franklin Medal (2024); Wolf Prize in Agriculture (2024)
- Scientific career
- Fields: Plant Biology
- Workplaces: Salk Institute for Biological Studies
- Doctoral advisor: Samuel Kaplan
- Website: www.salk.edu/scientist/joanne-chory/

Joanne Chory (March 19, 1955 – November 12, 2024) was an American plant biologist and geneticist. She was a professor and director of the Plant Molecular and Cellular Biology Laboratory at the Salk Institute for Biological Studies and an investigator of the Howard Hughes Medical Institute.

Chory was the founding director of the Salk Institute's Harnessing Plants Initiative (HPI), a carbon dioxide removal approach to fight climate change by optimizing a plant's natural ability to capture and store carbon dioxide and adapt to different climate conditions. Chory and the HPI team aim to help plants grow bigger and stronger root systems that can absorb larger amounts of carbon by burying it in the ground in the form of suberin, a naturally occurring substance. Chory and the HPI team received a $35 million award in support of the initiative from the TED Audacious Project in 2019 and another $30 million from the Bezos Earth Fund in 2020.

Chory's work at the Salk Institute, which she joined in 1988, pioneered the use of molecular genetics to study how plants change their shape and size to optimize photosynthesis and growth for different environments. She held the Howard H. and Maryam R. Newman Chair in Plant Biology and was an adjunct professor in the Section of Cell and Developmental Biology at UC San Diego.

Chory was elected as a foreign member of the Royal Society in 2011 and was the recipient of the 2018 Breakthrough Prize in Life Sciences and the 2019 Prince of Asturias Award for Technical and Scientific Research.

== Background ==
Chory was born in Boston, Massachusetts, in 1955. Her Lebanese parents raised her along with her four brothers and one sister. She began her upper-level education at Oberlin College in Ohio where she graduated with a degree in biology with honors. She earned her PhD at University of Illinois Urbana-Champaign.

She was a postdoctoral fellow at the Harvard Medical School in the lab of Frederick M. Ausubel. In 1988 she joined the Salk Institute as an assistant professor. Chory eventually married her husband, Stephen Worland, with whom she has two adopted children.

In 2004, Chory was diagnosed with Parkinson's disease. She struggled with the disease for well over a decade, but with the help of medications and a brain implant to help regulate her movement, she continued her genetic research. Along with her passion for genetics, Chory strived to inspire young women to become scientists and constantly worked to improve the field for women.

Chory's early career interests were centered in microbiology. Through her research in that field she developed a deeper interest in genetics, specifically research that was being done on Arabidopsis plants. Through her lengthy career in genetics she was awarded numerous accolades for her many contributions to the field.

Chory died from complications of Parkinson's disease in La Jolla, California, on November 12, 2024, at the age of 69.

== Career and research ==
Chory focused her research on finding a way to optimize plant growth to sustain a growing human population. She used Arabidopsis thaliana as a model organism, but her purpose was to optimize all plant growth and not just that of A. thaliana itself. She mutated the genes of the model organism and used the results to understand the effects that these mutations have. She approached this information from various directions including using genetics, genomics, cell biology, x-ray crystallography, biochemistry, and ecology. She made strides in understanding light sensitivity and hormones in these plants. She used this knowledge to optimize growth in other plants in hopes that the work will help sustain an ever-growing human population.

Chory showed particular appreciation for manipulation of phenotypes of an organism. Light signals are required for the induction and regulation of many developmental processes in plants. She participated in research dissecting this complex process by isolating mutations that alter light-regulated seedling development in Arabidopsis. Her work identified mutants that are deficient in the phytochrome photoreceptors and in nuclear-localized repressors and also revealed that steroid hormones control light-regulated seedling development. Dr. Chory's lab has been involved in the manipulation of the biosynthetic pathway for these steroids that altered the growth and development of plants and identification of the putative steroid receptor, a transmembrane receptor kinase. Her group has also contributed towards the understanding of chloroplast to nuclear retrograde signaling and plant shade avoidance responses.

== Awards and honors ==
- 2024 Wolf Prize in Agriculture
- 2024 Benjamin Franklin Medal
- 2020 Pearl Meister Greengard Prize
- 2019 Princess of Asturias Award for Technical and Scientific Research
- 2018 Gruber Prize in Genetics
- 2018 Breakthrough Prize in Life Sciences
- 2015 Elected to the American Philosophical Society
- 2012 Genetics Society of America Medal
- 2011 Elected Foreign Member of the Royal Society
- 2009 Elected Foreign Associate, Académie des Sciences, France
- 2008 Member, German Academy of Sciences Leopoldina
- 2006 Associate Member, EMBO
- 2005 Fellow of the American Association for the Advancement of Science
- 2004 Kumho Award in Plant Molecular Biology
- 2003 Scientific American 50: Research Leader in Agriculture
- 2000 L'Oreal-UNESCO Award for Women in Science
- 1999 Elected Member of the U.S. National Academy of Sciences
- 1998 Elected Fellow of the American Academy of Arts and Sciences
- 1997 Investigator, Howard Hughes Medical Institute
- 1995 Charles Albert Schull Award, awarded by American Society of Plant Biologists
- 1994 NAS Award for Initiatives in Research
