= John Carlson (biologist) =

American biologist and professor

John Russell Carlson is an American biologist and professor. He currently holds the Eugene Higgins Professor of Molecular, Cellular, and Developmental Biology at Yale University. He is an elected member of the National Academy of Sciences.

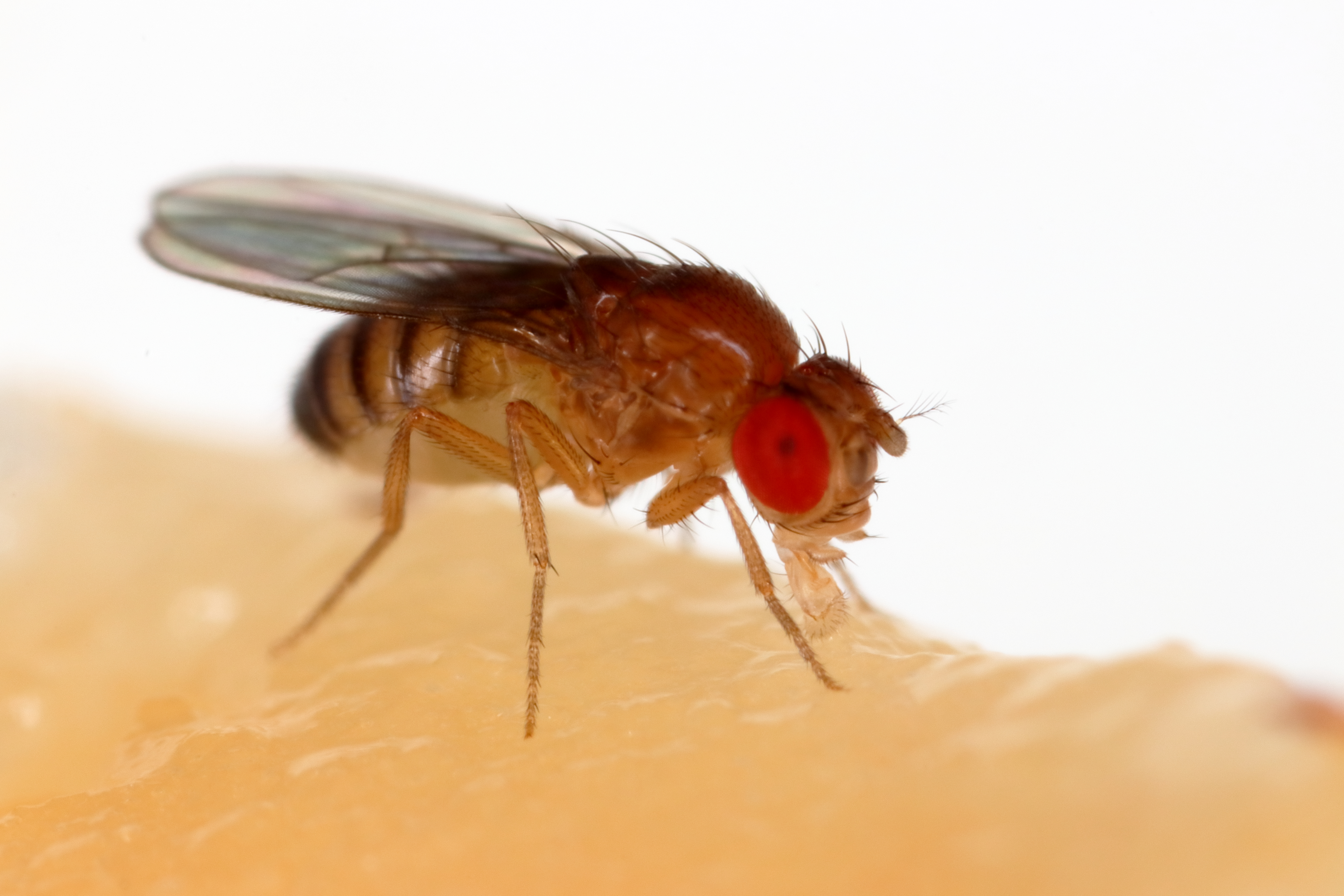
Drosophila Melanogaster, the object of Carlson's science

== Research ==
The Carlson lab studies insect chemosensation using the model organism Drosophila. Significant contributions to the field include discovery of the olfactory receptor genes in insects using the Drosophila genome, called the Odorant Receptor (Or) gene family, followed by the discovery of the insect taste receptor genes, called the Gustatory Receptor (Gr) gene family, a system to deorphanize insect odorant receptors referred to as the "empty neuron" system, using which a study identified ligands for most of the Drosophila Olfactory Receptor (Or) repertoire and a similar study that characterized the Or repertoire of the Anopheles gambiae mosquito. Carlson lab research has also been featured in Scientific American.

== Biography ==
Carlson earned his A.B. at Harvard University in 1977 and his Ph.D. from Stanford University in 1982.

== Honors ==
Carlson is a member of the National Academy of Sciences, and the American Academy of Arts and Sciences. Carlson was awarded the 2011 Genetics Society of America Medal. He is also a John Simon Guggenheim Memorial Foundation Fellow.
