= Alejandro Sánchez Alvarado =

Molecular biologist (born 1964)

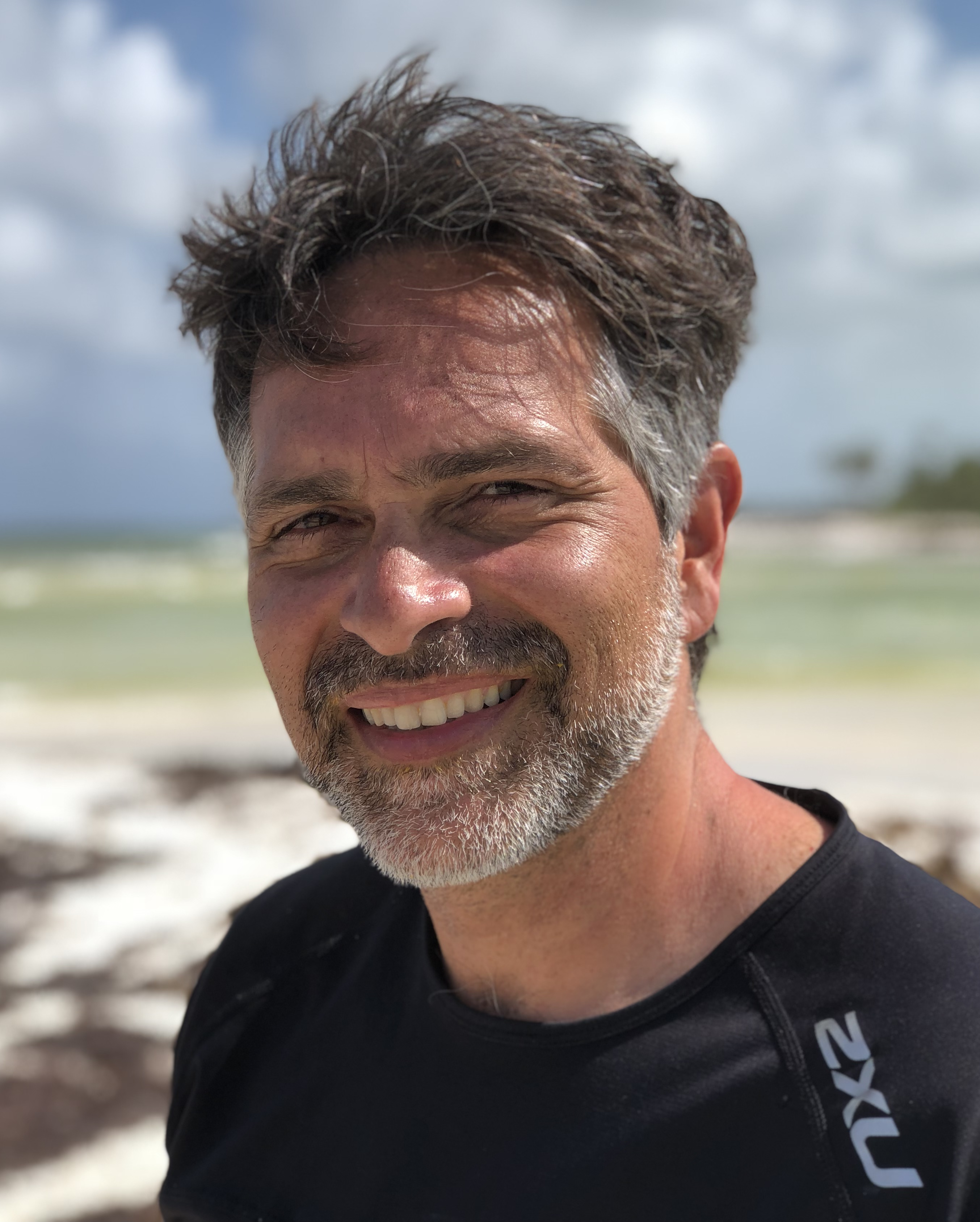
- Born: 24 February 1964 (age 62); Caracas, Venezuela
- Education: Vanderbilt University; University of Cincinnati College of Medicine
- Spouse: Tatjana Piotrowski
- Children: 2
- Scientific career
- Workplaces: Stowers Institute for Medical Research
- Doctoral advisor: Jeffrey Robbins
- Other academic advisors: Donald D. Brown
- Website: planaria.stowers.org

Alejandro Sánchez Alvarado is a Venezuelan-American molecular biologist. He is an Emeritus Investigator of the Howard Hughes Medical Institute, and President and Chief Scientific Officer of the Stowers Institute for Medical Research. The Sánchez Alvarado Laboratory focuses on understanding the regenerative capabilities of the planarian flatworm Schmidtea mediterranea. In 2015, Sánchez Alvarado was elected a fellow of the American Academy of Arts and Sciences, and to the National Academy of Sciences in 2018 for his distinguished and continuing achievements in original scientific research. In 2023, the Vilcek Foundation awarded Sánchez Alvarado the Vilcek Prize in Biomedical Science for “… his contributions to the field of regeneration—from the identification of crucial genes that control regeneration in living organisms, to the potential for regenerative medicine to treat disease.”

== Life ==
Born in Venezuela, Sánchez Alvarado attended the Colegio Emil Friedman for elementary and high school education, where he first cultivated his interest in biology. After receiving a BS in molecular biology and chemistry from Vanderbilt University in 1986, he attended the University of Cincinnati College of Medicine for his PhD in pharmacology and cell biophysics in the laboratory of Dr. Jeffrey Robbins. After receiving his Ph.D. in 1992, he carried out postdoctoral studies from 1994 to 1995 in Baltimore, Maryland at the Carnegie Institution of Washington, Department of Embryology under the mentorship of Dr. Donald D. Brown. He was then appointed Staff Associate at the Department of Embryology to run his own independent research group and during which he started to develop the planarian S. mediterranea as a research organism to study animal regeneration
