= NAS Award for Scientific Reviewing =

The NAS Award for Scientific Reviewing is awarded by the U.S. National Academy of Sciences (NAS) "to recognize authors whose reviews have synthesized extensive and difficult material, rendering a significant service to science and influencing the course of scientific thought." It has been awarded annually in specific fields since 1979.

== List of NAS Award for Scientific Reviewing winners ==
- Christina Maslach (2020, social sciences)

For her insightful, integrative reviews discovering and developing the rigorous research and multidimensional theory of worker or job burnout and interventions to mitigate it, thereby advancing science and improving human wellbeing.

- Robert Kennicutt (2019, astronomy)

For the highly cited review "Star Formation in Galaxies Along the Hubble Sequence" and related work synthesizing the broad field of stellar formation, which provided a critical intellectual foundation for the field.

- Ad Bax (2018, structural biology)

For lucid, revelatory reviews and pioneering technical concept pieces on the development and application of novel biomolecular NMR methods, particularly multidimensional methods, that have transformed the science of a generation of spectroscopists and the field of structural biology at large.

- Daniel Nagin (2017, criminology)

For exemplary reviews of the scientific literature on the crime-prevention effects of criminal and social sanctions. These reviews have altered the course of criminological theory and empirical research and have greatly informed analysis of public policy.

- Sergio Verdú (2016, computer science)

For consistent and distinguished contributions of review material in information theory, and for a leading role in developing high-quality review journals covering broad areas of the information sciences.

- Thomas Dean Pollard (2015, biochemistry)

For his published reviews tracing the history of cell motility from its beginnings, critically analyzing the biochemical reactions responsible for cellular movements, critiquing the methods and assumptions used in the field, and synthesizing the information available into creative models that have guided the development of the field.

- Sarah B. Hrdy (2014, biosocial interactions)

For her insightful and visionary synthesis of a broad range of data and concepts from across the social and biological sciences to illuminate the importance of biosocial processes among mothers, infants, and other social actors in forming the evolutionary

- Bruce Kleiner and John Lott (2013, mathematics)

For their joint explication of Perelman's celebrated solution of the Poincaré Conjecture; the Kleiner/Lott presentation was instrumental in making the solution accessible to the mathematical community, and, as the first detailed scientific presentation, played a crucial role in the verification of the solution.

- Larry R. Squire (2012, neuroscience)

For his prolific contributions of reviews on the organization of and history of research on memory systems, for editing textbooks on neuroscience and learning and memory and biographies of the leaders of neuroscience research, and for contributing numerous book reviews, which have provided a valuable resource for neuroscientists and has made the study of learning and memory accessible to a broad audience.

- Thomas J. Sargent (2011, economics)

For his pathbreaking books that integrate dynamic macroeconomic models under uncertainty with time series econometric methods, which have informed and enlightened a generation of economic researchers.

- John Alroy (2010, geosciences)

For developing the Paleobiology Database, which has produced an extraordinarily extensive synthesis of paleontological data that has been driving the field of paleobiology forward in ways that would have been previously impossible.

- Roger W. Hendrix (2009, genetics)

Hendrix's reviews, overviews, and minireviews have focused research in the areas of structure, assembly, and genomics of bacteriophages and include numerous original and provocative ideas.

- Alejandro Portes (2008, social and political sciences)

For contributions to the understanding of immigrant and transnational communities through penetrating reviews in the areas of immigration, education, globalization, and social capital.

- Geoffrey R. Burbidge (2007, astronomy)

For contributions as editor of the Annual Review of Astronomy from 1974 to 2004, using his vast knowledge to make it the premier astronomy review journal worldwide.

- Peter Vitousek (2006, environmental science)

For his scholarly and inspirational book and reviews on nitrogen cycling and its role in the evolving patterns of ecosystem productivity and diversity.

- Daniel L. Schacter (2005, psychology)

For his numerous books and reviews, which illuminate and explain the psychology and neuroscience of human memory for specialists, scientific colleagues, and the public.

- Donald G. Truhlar (2004, chemical physics)

For his incisive reviews on transition-state theory, potential energy surfaces, quantum scattering theory, and solvation models, which have informed and enlightened the chemical physics community for a generation.

- Stuart H. Hurlbert (2003, ecology)

For his lively reviews of species diversity, experimental design, keystone species, and other issues in ecology, which have shaped the work of generations of ecologists.

- Roy D'Andrade (2002, anthropology)

For his creative synthesis of intersections of anthropology with psychology and his insightful interpretations of historical trends shaping the future goals of anthropology.

- Milton W. Cole (2001, materials science)

For his valued reviews and monographs which have critically assessed and inspired novel research concerning electrons and films at surfaces.

- Charles F. Stevens (2000, neuroscience)

For his numerous "News and Views" articles in Nature that, for more than a decade, reviewed nearly all the major advances in molecular neuroscience.

- James M. Poterba (1999, economics)

For his influential and comprehensive review of factors determining the savings of individuals over their lifetimes and the private accumulation of wealth for retirement.

- James R. Holton (1998, geology/geophysics)

For his landmark reviews which have become the primary cornerstones of the current understanding of dynamical meteorology of the earth's stratosphere for both researchers and students.

- Paul H. Harvey (1997, evolutionary biology)

For his many influential reviews embracing all aspects of evolutionary biology, and particularly for bringing evolutionary perspectives to other areas of biological investigation.

- Jeffrey S. Banks (1996, social/political sciences)

For his influential reviews of work on the theory of games of incomplete formation, theory of automata, and the theory of repeated play games as they apply to political relationships, as well as for his extensive editorial work.

- Robion C. Kirby (1995, mathematics)

For his list of problems in low-dimensional topology and his tireless maintenance of it; several generations have been greatly influenced by Kirby's list.

- Thomas M. Jessell (1994, developmental biology)

For his contributions, by writing and editing reviews, to bridging the fields of developmental neurobiology and developmental biology.

- Janet Taylor Spence (1993, psychology)

For her pervasive and generative influence upon virtually all of the contemporary, scientific literature of psychology as editor, author, and policy maker.

- Robert T. Watson (1992, chemistry)

For his leading international reviews of stratospheric ozone research, which have served as the basis for industrial and governmental decisions to regulate the atmospheric emissions of chlorofluorocarbons.

- Alexander N. Glazer (1991, botany)

For his lucid, enthusiastic, informative, and gracefully written reviews explaining the structure and operation of phycobilisomes, the phycobiliprotein complexes that harvest light for photosynthesis in cyanobacteria.

- James N. Spuhler (1990, anthropology)

For his reviews, which used population genetics to illuminate such anthropological questions as race and intelligence, the biological and cultural components of language, "scientific creationism" relationships among species, and the timetable of human evolution.

- Sidney R. Coleman (1989, physics)

For his lucid, insightful, and influential reviews on partially conserved currents, gauge theories, instantons, and magnetic monopoles—subjects fundamental to field theory and particle physics.

- Eric R. Kandel (1988, cell biology)

For his reviews relating findings in simple systems to those obtained in higher forms, which have greatly influenced modern study of the cellular basis of learning.

- Gardner Lindzey (1987, psychology)

For 40 years he has aimed his critical eye at the current work in personality psychology, social psychology, and behavioral genetics, always balancing a talent for synthesis with a seasoned researcher's sense of complexity.

- Virginia Trimble (1986, astronomy)

For informing and enlightening the astronomical community by her numerous, comprehensive, scholarly, and literate reviews, which have elucidated many complex astrophysical questions.

- Ira Herskowitz (1985, biochemistry)

For his incisive reviews of phage biology, both literary and pictorial, that have focused and enlivened their subject for practitioners and spectators alike.

- Ernest R. Hilgard (1984, psychology)

For his creative synthesis of the literature on conditioning and learning theory, which shaped the development of the field for several decades, and for his subsequent application of those same skills to the difficult areas of hypnosis, suggestibility, and consciousness.

- Michael E. Fisher (1983, critical phenomena)

For his continuing sequence of reviews that put into proper perspective discoveries concerning critical phenomena and defined the fundamental problems he and others subsequently resolved.

- Victor A. McKusick (1982, genetics)

For the preparation of rigorous and comprehensive reviews, which have stimulated and guided the entire field of human genetic research in both its basic and clinical aspects.

- John S. Chipman (1981, economics)

For his outstanding contributions to economic thought, particularly his highly acclaimed surveys of economic theory on international trade, welfare economics, and the Paretian heritage.

- W. Conyers Herring (1980, applied physics)

For a career of service to the scientific community and particularly its review literature.

- G. Alan Robinson (1979, pharmacology)

For his insightful contributions to the recognition of the pervasive biological importance of cyclic adenosine monophosphate.

== See also ==
- List of general science and technology awards
