= Roger Hendrix =

American biologist

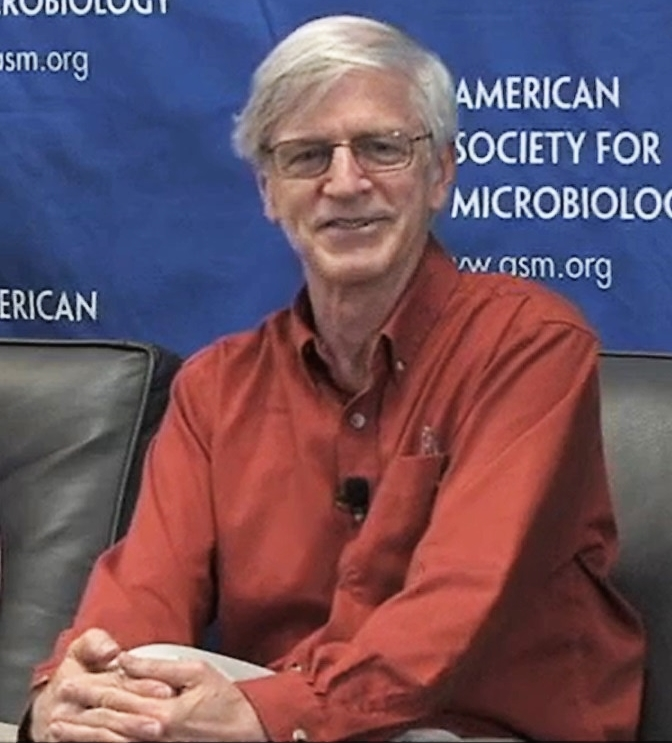
Hendrix at the 2011 American Society for Microbiology General Meeting in New Orleans.

Roger W. Hendrix (July 7, 1943 – August 15, 2017) was an American biologist, focusing in bacteriophage biology, and a distinguished professor at University of Pittsburgh. He studied biology at the California Institute of Technology and went on to obtain his Ph.D. from Harvard University under the supervision of James Watson, the co-discoverer of the structure of DNA. In 2009, he received the NAS Award for Scientific Reviewing.

He died on August 15, 2017.
