= Nancy Kleckner =

American molecular biologist

- Education: Harvard University, Massachusetts Institute of Technology
- Known for: chromosome mechanics
- Awards: Thomas Hunt Morgan Medal (2016)
- Scientific career
- Workplaces: Harvard University
- Doctoral advisor: Ethan Signer
- Doctoral students: Victoria Lundblad

Nancy Kleckner is the Herchel Smith Professor of Molecular Biology at Harvard University and principal investigator at the Kleckner Laboratory at Harvard University.

== Education ==
Nancy Kleckner worked with Matt Meselson as an undergraduate at Harvard University, earning her degree in 1968. She then moved on to do her PhD at Massachusetts Institute of Technology working with Ethan Signer on the genetics of lambda phage and DNA replication. She did a postdoc under David Botstein at Princeton University in 1974.

== Career ==
Kleckner returned to Harvard as a professor in 1977 and was awarded tenure in 1985. Her first graduate student at Harvard was Victoria Lundblad, who discovered the gene-enzyme systems of yeast that control formation of telomeres.

Her work in transposons and mutagenesis has been largely productive, and led her to study the physical mechanism of chromosome replication. She discovered SeqA, a protein involved in initiation of DNA replication.

Currently, she runs the Kleckner Lab at Harvard University which performs research related to chromosome and membrane mechanics.

== Awards ==
- 1990 Genetics Society of America Medal
- 1993 Elected to the National Academy of Sciences
- 2016 Thomas Hunt Morgan Medal for lifetime achievement in the field of genetics
- Elected Fellow of the American Academy of Arts and Sciences
- Elected Fellow of the American Association for the Advancement of Science
- Elected Fellow of the American Academy of Microbiology
