= Michael Hengartner =

Swiss-Canadian biochemist & biologist

Michael Otmar Hengartner
- Born: June 5, 1966 (age 60); St. Gallen, Switzerland
- Education: Université Laval (1988); Massachusetts Institute of Technology (Ph.D., 1994)
- Occupation: President of the ETH Board
- Spouse: Denise Hengartner
- Children: sixT

Michael Otmar Hengartner (born 5 June 1966, St. Gallen, Switzerland) is a Swiss-Canadian biochemist and molecular biologist. From February 2020 he has been president of the ETH Board. Before that he was the president of the University of Zurich and president of the Swiss Rectors' Conference, swissuniversities.

== Early life and education ==
Hengartner was born in 1966, the son of a Swiss mathematics professor. The family moved first to Paris, later to Bloomington, Indiana and then to Quebec City, where he grew up.

He studied biochemistry at the Université Laval in Quebec, and graduated with a B.S. in 1988. He received a doctorate in 1994 from the Massachusetts Institute of Technology under H. Robert Horvitz. He then led a research group at the Cold Spring Harbor Laboratory.

== Career ==
In 1997, he co-founded the biotech company Devgen. In 2001, he was appointed to the newly established Ernst Hadorn Endowed Professorship at the Institute of Molecular Biology of the University of Zurich. In 2008, he co-founded the scientific consultancy company Evaluescience. From 2009 to 2014, he was Dean of the Faculty of Mathematics and Natural Sciences of the University of Zurich; and from 2014 to 2019, rector of the University of Zurich. Since 2019, he has been director of the ETH Board and since 2009, a member of the National Academy of Sciences Leopoldina. On February 1, 2020, he took up his position as President of the ETH Board. In August 2020 Hengartner spoke about the Swiss lack of courage to "think big" despite investing heavily in education and basic research. He confirmed ETH Zurich's efforts to fostering a culture of innovation achieving faster market maturity of innovative products, especially in the area of digitization and climate. In November 2021 Hengartner highlighted the concerns about the consequences of brain drain from Switzerland.

In January 2022, Hengartner drew attention to Switzerland experiencing the first consequences of being excluded from Horizon Europe with top Swiss scientists losing leadership roles in Horizon projects and young scientists being denied internationally recognised grants and the resulting problems of attracting leading scientists. He emphasised the urgency for the Swiss State Secretariat for Education, Research and Innovation to find alternative ways forward and for politicians to ensure its funding, but he also hoped for an EU agreement by the end of 2022.

In February 2022, in run up to the Swiss referendum on animal testing, Hengartner stood his ground in a debate, emphasising that Swiss laws ranked human life higher than that of animals, which is a moral value people either do or don't share, but at the same time he also highlighted the resulting tightrope walk of balancing the benefit of research for humans against the suffering of animals. In October 2022 Hengartner discussed Switzerland's scientific advantage through the high number of well-known residential scientists making it an attractive choice for the upcoming generation, but also referred to his concerns over the EU's decision to relegate Switzerland to a „non-associated third country“, robbing Switzerland of its position of influence in Horizon Europe, the EU's 7-year scientific research programme, as well as denying it access to future funding from the European Research Council.

He is a member of the Swiss National Science Foundation.

== Private life ==
Hengartner is married to biologist Denise Hengartner. The couple has six children.

== Research interests ==
Hengartner is researching the molecular basis of apoptosis. He uses especially the nematode Caenorhabditis elegans as molecular organism. He is also investigating mechanisms of cancer, Alzheimer's and geriatric diseases.

== Awards ==
- 2003: Dr. Josef Steiner Cancer Research Prize
- 2006: National Latsis Prize of Switzerland
- 2006: Cloëtta Prize
- 2010: Credit Suisse Award for Best Teaching from the University of Zurich
- 2016: Honorary doctorate from Université Pierre et Marie Curie and the University of Paris-Sorbonne
