= Victoria Lundblad =

American molecular biologist

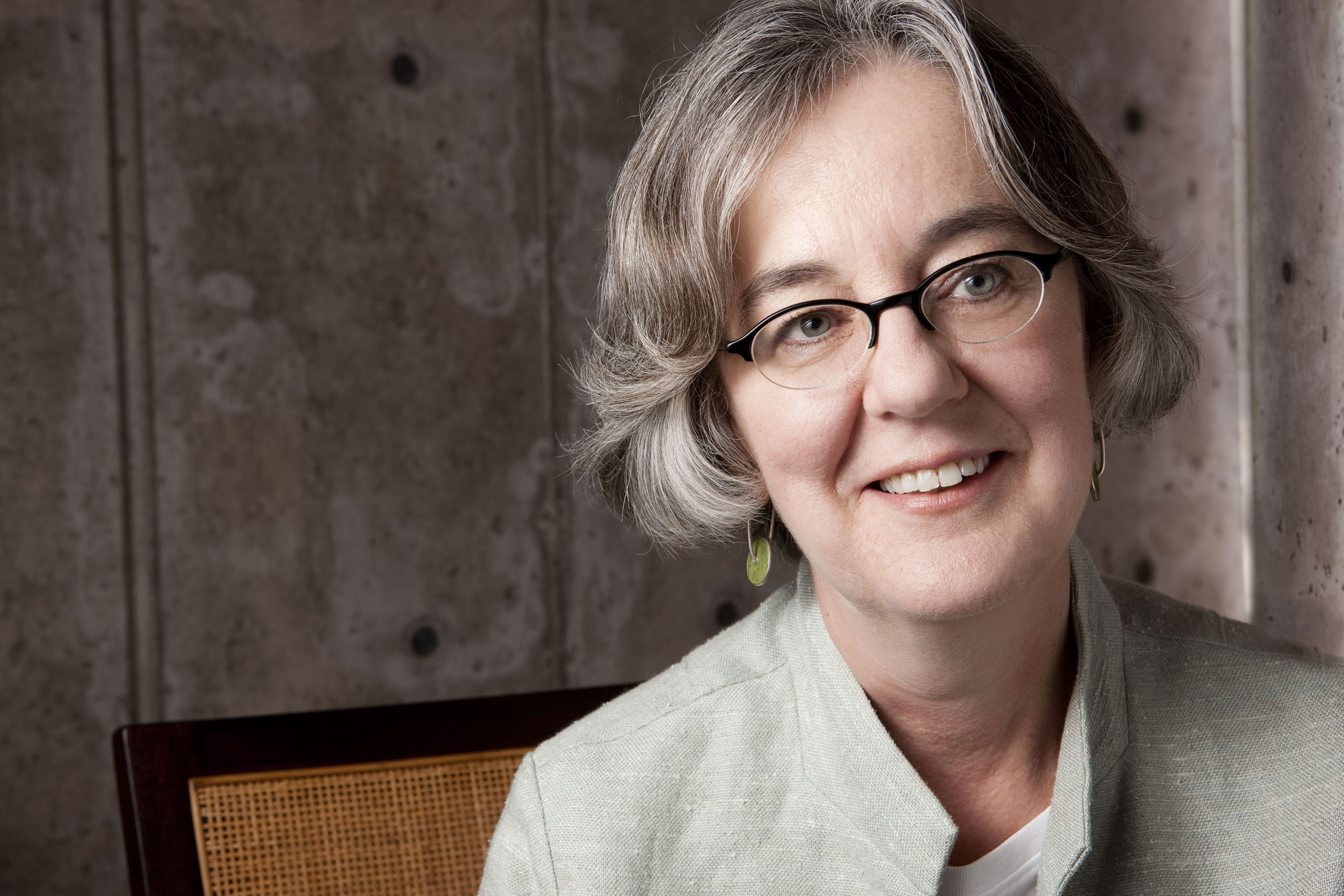
- Citizenship: American
- Education: UC Berkeley Harvard University
- Scientific career
- Fields: Genetics
- Workplaces: Salk Institute for Biological Studies

Victoria Lundblad is an American geneticist whose work focuses on the genetic control of chromosome behavior in yeast. Many of her discoveries have concerned telomerase, the RNA-containing enzyme that completes the ends of chromosomes. She works at the Salk Institute in La Jolla, California.

== Early life and education ==
Victoria Lundblad was born in the Bay Area of California to a biochemist and a school teacher. Vicki Lundblad was involved in science experiments as early as junior high school, testing whether skin emitted substances that repelled mosquitoes. She then took up playing the cello and threw herself into music studies; arriving at University of California, Berkeley, she meant to major in mathematics and music. She narrowed it down to Mathematics, but later added Biology.

She pursued graduate education in biology at Harvard University, where she became Nancy Kleckner's first graduate student. At Harvard, she was excited by a lecture by Jack Szostak, Nobel laureate in 2016, about his work on telomeres with Elizabeth Blackburn. She began a postdoctoral fellowship in 1983, working with Jack Szostak on yeast with a defective telomerase that underwent early senescence. She continued her study of telomeres as a postdoctoral fellow in Elizabeth Blackburn's laboratory. In 1991, she joined the genetics department at Baylor College of Medicine. In 2004, she moved to the Salk Institute.

== Research career ==
In 1989, Lundblad identified a gene named EST1 ("ever shorter telomeres") in which telomeres are lost, and found that EST1 encoded a regulatory subunit of telomerase. Later, collaborating with Nobel laureate Tom Cech, she discovered the catalytic subunit of telomerase and identified it as a reverse transcriptase with associated RNA.

In 2017, three women full professors at the Salk Institute filed gender discrimination suits against the institute, pointing out that research funding was not distributed fairly, that only 13% of the research staff were women, and that of the five smallest laboratory spaces, four were assigned to women, among other problems. Salk Institute responded that Lundblad was "consistently ranking below her peers in producing high quality research and attracting" grant support and that each of the three professors ranked in "the bottom quartile of her peers". Scientific colleagues across the country objected to this characterization of Lundblad, including Nobel laureate Carol Greider, whose work also concerns telomerase, and who said Lundblad was "one of the few icons in the field," and that "for me to read in a press release that she's somehow in the bottom quartile rang really poorly to me." In August, 2018, Lundblad settled the lawsuit out of court with undisclosed remedies offered by the institute.

In 2014 she was elected to the American Academy of Microbiology — one of 16 women out of the 88 new fellows that year.

== Honors and awards ==
- 1997 DeBakey Excellence in Research Award from Baylor College of Medicine
- 2008 Pearl Mester Greengard Prize from Rockefeller University.
- 2015 National Academy of Sciences in Medical Genetics, Hematology, and Oncology

== Selected works ==
Nugent CI, Hughes TR, Lue NF, Lundblad V.(1996) "Cdc13p: a single-strand telomeric DNA-binding protein with a dual role in yeast telomere maintenance." Science 274(5285):249-52.

Lundblad V, Wright WE. (1996) "Telomeres and telomerase: a simple picture becomes complex." Cell 87(3):369-75.

Virta-Pearlman V, Morris DK, Lundblad V. (1996) "Est1 has the properties of a single-stranded telomere end-binding protein." Genes Dev. 10(24):3094-104.

Lendvay TS, Morris DK, Sah J, Balasubramanian B, Lundblad V. (1996) "Senescence mutants of Saccharomyces cerevisiae with a defect in telomere replication identify three additional EST genes." Genetics 144(4):1399-412.

Linger J, Hughes TR, Shevchenko A, Mann M, Lundblad V, Cech TR. )1997) "Reverse transcriptase motifs in the catalytic subunit of telomerase." Science. 276(5312):561-7.
