= John Alroy =

American paleontologist

- Born: 1966 (age 59–60); New York, United States
- Education: BS Reed College; PhD University of Chicago
- Awards: NAS Award for Scientific Reviewing (2010); Charles Schuchert Award (2007); Romer Prize (1994)
- Scientific career
- Fields: Paleontology; Paleobiology
- Workplaces: Macquarie University; NCEAS; University of Arizona; Smithsonian National Museum of Natural History

John Alroy is a paleobiologist born in New York in 1966 and now residing in Sydney, Australia.

== Area of expertise ==
Alroy specializes in diversity curves, speciation, and extinction of North American fossil mammals and Phanerozoic marine invertebrates, connecting regional and local diversity, taxonomic composition, body mass distributions, ecomorphology, and phylogenetic patterns to intrinsic diversity dynamics, evolutionary trends, mass extinctions, and the effects of global climate change.

In a 3 September 2010 online article by Hugh Collins, a contributor for AOL Online Science, Alroy was quoted in a newly released study paper from Sydney's Macquarie University that "It would be unwise to assume that any large number of species can be lost today without forever altering the basic biological character of Earth's oceans."

== Education ==
He graduated from Hunter College High School in 1984. He then received his BA from Reed College, Department of Biology, in 1989. And then his PHD from University of Chicago, Committee on Evolutionary Biology, in 1994.

== Professional life ==
In 1989, Alroy began his career at the Smithsonian Institution as a predoctoral intern, where he worked in the Department of Paleobiology and the Evolution of Terrestrial Ecosystems program. He later conducted research from 1994 to 1996 at the University of Arizona as part of its Research Training Group in the Analysis of Biodiversification.

From 1998 to 2010, he worked at the National Center for Ecological Analysis and Synthesis as a postdoctoral fellow and with the University of California, Santa Barbara as an assistant and later associate researcher.

== Honors ==
- 1994 Romer Prize of the Society of Vertebrate Paleontology.
- 2007 Charles Schuchert Award of the Paleontological Society.
- 2010 NAS Award for Scientific Reviewing from the National Academy of Sciences.

== Appearance event ordination ==
Appearance Event Ordination (AEO) is a superior form of dating fossil collections, according to Alroy. Age assignments to North American land mammals are provided for comparison and may disagree with the AEO estimates because they are taken straight from published sources. Therefore, the assignments reflect the subjective opinions of the authors who described the fossils. They are not based on quantitative analyses of faunal and biostratigraphic data.

"AEO age estimates are preferable because they are objective, repeatable, and quantitative. That's because AEO uses explicitly recorded and clearly defined numerical data, and because it uses algorithmic search and optimization criteria instead of verbal argumentation."

== Selected publications ==
- The shifting balance of diversity among major marine animal groups. Science 329:1191–1194 (2010).
- Speciation and extinction in the fossil record of North American mammals. pp. 301–323 in R. Butlin, J. Bridle, and D. Schluter (eds.), Speciation and Patterns of Diversity. Cambridge University Press, Cambridge (2009).
- Dynamics of origination and extinction in the marine fossil record. PNAS 105:11536-11542 (2008).
- Phanerozoic trends in the global diversity of marine invertebrates. Science 321:97–100 (with 34 others: 2008).
- Statistical independence of escalatory ecological trends in Phanerozoic marine invertebrates. Science 312:897–900 (with Madin et al.: 2006).
- A multispecies overkill simulation of the end-Pleistocene megafaunal mass extinction. Science 292:1893–1896 (2001).
- Global climate change and North American mammalian evolution by John Alroy, Paul L. Koch, and James C. Zachos; The Paleontological Society (2000).
- Successive approximations of diversity curves: Ten more years in the library. Geology 28:1023–1026 (2000).
- Equilibrial diversity dynamics in North American mammals. pp. 232–287 in M. L. McKinney and J. Drake (eds.), Biodiversity Dynamics: Turnover of Populations, Taxa and Communities. Columbia University Press, York (1998).
- Cope's rule and the dynamics of body mass evolution in North American mammals. Science 280:731–734.
- Constant extinction, constrained diversification, and uncoordinated stasis in North American mammals. Palaeogeography, Palaeoclimatology, Palaeoecology 127:285–311 (1996).
