= James Spuhler =

American biological anthropologist

- Born: James Norman Spuhler; March 1, 1917; Tucumcari, New Mexico, US
- Died: September 2, 1992 (aged 75); Santa Fe, New Mexico, US
- Education: University of New Mexico; Harvard University
- Spouse: Helen McKaig (m. 1946–1992)
- Children: Derek Drake
- Awards: NAS Award for Scientific Reviewing (1990)
- Scientific career
- Fields: Biological anthropology Genetic anthropology
- Institutions: Ohio State University; University of Michigan; University of New Mexico
- Thesis: Some Procedures in Human Genetics: A methodological study (1946)
- Doctoral advisor: Earnest Hooton

James Norman Spuhler (March 1, 1917 – September 2, 1992) was an American biological anthropologist who has been described as "the founder of anthropological genetics". He taught at the University of New Mexico from 1967 to 1984, where his research focused on human genetics. In 1990, he received the NAS Award for Scientific Reviewing. He died of cancer at his home in Santa Fe, New Mexico, on September 2, 1992.

== Background ==
James Spuhler began his education at the University of New Mexico. He started at the university on a football scholarship, but gave up his scholarship to focus on his education. After he graduated, he was sent to China because of World War 2. While in China he served as a Naval officer and learned to speak some Chinese and Japanese. When he returned from the war he started at Harvard University to be trained in physical anthropology. While studying at Harvard he wrote his dissertation on human genetics, which was one of the first of this topic submitted to any Department of Anthropology in the United States. While he was at Harvard, genetic knowledge was not used in relation to human populations as Spuhler was the first to be trained in this field. His dissertation prevented information for his two different subjects of expertise: human genetics and physical anthropology. Following his Ph.D. he worked as an instructor at the Ohio State University in the Department of Anthropology and Sociology. Spuhler became a reviewer but never worked full time because he continued to do research in the field and laboratory.

== Research ==
The first study we contributed to was one of his teachers, Clyde Kluckhohn. Spuhler suggested a strategy of studying the nine genetic traits of the Ramah Navaho. The nine traits included in the study were a secrater factor of saliva, PTC taste reaction, anterior thoracic venus patterns, color perceptions, occipital hair whorl, absence of peroneus teritus muscles, and the number of vallate papillae on the tongue.

His next project was a study of racial-ethnic differences in IQ. This study was completed during the academic year of 1971–1972 at the Center for Advanced Study in the Behavioral Sciences in Palo Alto, California. He and other scholars cooperatively researched the genetic and environmental variations that would account for the racial-ethnic differences in IQ. The results of the study stated that the environmental and genetic differences will not always occur. After this study was completed he was hired as a chair of the Department of Anthropology at the University of Michigan. He started the first two courses with a focus of genetic anthropology in the United States, which influenced further teaching of biological anthropology. The two courses were called " The Genetic Basis of Evolution" and "Population Genetics".

== Rewards ==
In 1990 James Spuhler was awarded the Award of Excellence for Scientific Reviewing by the National Academy of Sciences. He was given this award for his reviews that used population genetics that study anthropological questions. There were a wide array of study topics including race, intelligence, language, relationships among species, and human evolution. Spuhler explains that he writes for the "general scientific public, whether citizen or professional." Over 700 publications have cited his work.
