= PTC Therapeutics =

Pharmaceutical company

Coordinates: 40.550722°N 74.423071°W

PTC Therapeutics, Inc.
- Type: Public
- Traded as: Nasdaq: PTCT; Russell 2000 component; S&P 600 component
- Industry: Pharmaceuticals
- Founded: January 1, 1998; 28 years ago
- Headquarters: Warren Township, New Jersey, U.S.
- Revenue: ▲US$1.73 billion (2025)
- Net income: ▲US$683 million (2025)
- Website: ptcbio.com

PTC Therapeutics, Inc. is an U.S.-based pharmaceutical company focused on the development of orally administered small molecule drugs and gene therapies that alter gene expression via post-transcriptional control (PTC) mechanisms in orphan diseases.

In September 2009, PTC entered into an agreement with Roche for the development of orally bioavailable small molecules for central nervous system diseases. PTC acquired the Bio-e platform in 2019.

== Products ==
In 2017, PTC acquired Emflaza (deflazacort) from Marathon Pharmaceuticals. PTC also owns Translarna (ataluren), another therapy marketed for nonsense mutation Duchenne muscular dystrophy. The two products generated revenues of $174 million and $260 million in 2017 and 2018, respectively.

PTC has the commercialization rights for WAYLIVRA (volanesorsen) in Latin America.

In 2018, PTC acquired Agilis Biotherapeutics and a gene therapy candidate, GT-AADC, with compelling clinical data in treating aromatic L-amino acid decarboxylase (AADC) deficiency. AADC deficiency is a rare CNS disorder arising from reductions in the enzyme AADC that result from mutations in the dopa decarboxylase (DDC) gene. As of 2024, the AAV based treatment for AADC deficiency has been approved by the FDA and commercialized in the United States as Kebilidi. It is the first FDA-approved gene therapy treatment for AADC deficiency. This same product was granted EMA approval for use in the European Union under the name Upstaza.

== Pipeline ==
In 2020, PTC acquired Censa Pharmaceuticals, a biopharmaceutical company focused on the development of CNSA-001 (sepiapterin), a clinical-stage investigational therapy for orphan metabolic diseases, including phenylketonuria (PKU) and other diseases associated with defects in the tetrahydrobiopterin (BH4) biochemical pathways diagnosed at birth.

In 2020, PTC announced the FDA approval of Evrysdi (risdiplam) for the treatment of spinal muscular atrophy (SMA) in adults and children 2 months and older.

In 2024, Novartis committed $1 billion upfront in a licensing deal with PTC for an experimental treatment for Huntington’s disease, with the potential for an additional $1.9 billion tied to achieving specific development, regulatory, and commercial milestones. PTC Therapeutics’ therapy, known as PTC518, is an oral medication designed to reduce the production of the mutant protein linked to the genetic mutation responsible for the disease. This mutant protein is believed to contribute to neuronal death, driving disease progression. In June, interim data from a Phase 2 trial indicated that PTC518 successfully lowered levels of the mutant protein in both blood and cerebrospinal fluid.

In 2026, PTC acquired isaralgagene civaparvovec, an AAV gene therapy for Fabry disease, from Sangamo Therapeutics in a section 363 bankruptcy auction. PTC paid $111 million in cash upfront, with an additional $80 million to be paid upon the drug's accelerated approval and $20 million upon full approval. At the time of the acquisition, Sangamo had already initiated a rolling BLA submission seeking accelerated approval of isaralgagene civaparvovec, with only the CMC module left to complete.
