= Junying Yuan =

American biologist (born 1958)

- Born: October 3, 1958 (age 68); Shanghai, China
- Education: Fudan University; Harvard University; Massachusetts Institute of Technology
- Known for: Apoptosis research Necroptosis
- Scientific career
- Fields: Biology; Cell death
- Workplaces: Harvard Medical School
- Doctoral advisor: H. Robert Horvitz

Junying Yuan (Chinese: 袁钧瑛; pinyin: Yuán Jūnyīng, born October 3, 1958) is the Elizabeth D. Hay Professor of Cell Biology at Harvard Medical School, best known for her work in cell death. Early in her career, she contributed significant findings to the discovery and characterization of apoptosis. Additionally, she discovered the programmed form of necrotic cell death known as necroptosis.

== Education and early career ==
Yuan was born in Shanghai, her maternal grandfather was the scholar and translator Li Qingya (李青崖), and her paternal grandfather, Yuan Kaiji (袁开基), was a famous professor of organic chemistry. Her parents were both medical professors at Fudan University Shanghai Medical College, while her uncle, Yuan Chengye, was a professor and an academician of the Chinese Academy of Sciences. Junying Yuan attended Fudan University following the revival of higher education after its suspension under the Cultural Revolution. She was among the first wave of students to attempt the newly revived National Higher Education Entrance Examination in 1977, coming in first of all students who attempted it in Shanghai. She completed her bachelor's in biochemistry in 1982, and was subsequently one of the first students admitted to doctoral study in the United States through the China-U.S. Biochemistry Examination and Application (CUSBEA) program, coming in second out of the 25,000 who attempted the CUSBEA in its first year.

In the United States, she completed her Ph.D. in Neuroscience(1989) at Harvard University under the supervision of MIT professor H. Robert Horvitz, where she endeavored to elucidate the molecular mechanisms behind programmed cell death in the nematode Caenorhabditis elegans. She identified the proteins ced-3 and ced-4 as drivers behind programmed cell death in C. elegans, and subsequently identified the mammalian homologue of ced-3 known as interleukin-1 beta-converting enzyme(ICE), later called caspase-1.

== Career ==
Junying Yuan established an independent lab at Harvard-affiliated Massachusetts General Hospital in 1989, immediately upon completion of her Ph.D. Her initial efforts were directed towards providing evidence for the functional role of caspases in mediating mammalian apoptosis. Her independent work at this stage provided the first insights into molecular mechanisms in mammalian apoptosis, which contributed significantly to the Nobel Prize in Chemistry won by her Ph.D. supervisor, Robert Horvitz.

In 1996, Yuan moved her lab to the Department of Cell Biology at Harvard Medical School's Longwood campus, where she continued her investigation into cell death. Her work delved further into programmed cell death and revealed a wide cohort of proteins involved in the regulation and consequences of apoptosis. Some notable work includes her discovery that BID cleavage by caspase-8 mediates mitochondrial damage in apoptosis, and her discovery of caspase-11's role in regulating caspase-1-driven inflammation.

In 2005, Yuan's group discovered a non-apoptotic form of programmed necrotic cell death, which they termed "necroptosis". Other groups first observed that the stimulation of Fas/TNFR family of death-domain receptors (DR) activated a canonical apoptotic pathway; however, in many cell types, not only did caspase inhibition fail to inhibit cell death, as would be expected of canonical apoptosis, but stimulated cells experienced a form of cell death that more closely resembled necrosis than apoptosis. Yuan's group conducted a chemical screen that identified a small molecule capable of inhibiting DR-driven cell death, necrostatin-1, and demonstrated necroptosis' role in ischemic neuronal injury, thereby positing a potential role for necrostatin-1 in stroke treatment. Her group then identified RIPK1 as the target for necrostatin-1, thus implicating it as a key player in necroptosis.

Yuan went on to identify and characterize members of the signaling network responsible for regulating necroptosis, and continues to elucidate the mechanisms of necroptosis while exploring its potential as a target of therapeutic intervention. Necrosis was previously considered to be a form of passive cell death, forced in response to stress. This belief had driven an aversion towards developing therapeutic applications targeting necrosis. In demonstrating a form of programmed necrosis, Yuan's work revealed new avenues of treatment for an ever-increasing cohort of diseases where necroptosis is implicated. As of 2019, small-molecule inhibitors of RIPK1 have advanced beyond Phase I human clinical trials for the treatment of various inflammatory and neurodegenerative diseases, including amyotrophic lateral sclerosis (ALS), Alzheimer's disease, rheumatoid arthritis, psoriasis, and Crohn's disease.

== Awards and Fellowships ==
- 1985-1989 Ryan Fellowship
- 1994 Wilson S. Stone Memorial Award
- 1996-1999 American Heart Established Investigator
- 1999 SCBA Outstanding Young Investigator Award
- 2002 Innovator Award for Breast Cancer Research
- 2002 Merit Award, National Institute of Aging
- 2003 BBS Mentoring Award, Harvard Medical School
- 2005 National Institutes of Health Director's Pioneer Award
- 2006 International Cell Death Society Award
- 2007 Fellow of the American Academy of Arts and Sciences
- 2010 Fellow of the American Association for the Advancement of Science
- 2013 Agilent Technologies Thought Leader Award
- 2017 Member of the National Academy of Sciences
