= List of American Nobel laureates =

The Nobel Prize

Since 1901, the Nobel Prize has been awarded to a total of 1036 individuals and organizations as of 2026. In 2026, The United States has the highest number of Nobel laureates in the world, with over 429 Nobel laureates. Around 71% of all Nobel Prizes have been awarded to Americans; around 29% of them are immigrants from other nations.

U.S. President Theodore Roosevelt was the first American to win a Nobel Prize of any kind, being awarded the Nobel Peace Prize in 1906 for his role in negotiating peace for the Russo-Japanese War. Albert Michelson was the first American to win a Nobel Prize in any of the sciences, and Sinclair Lewis was the first American to win the Nobel Prize in Literature.

== Chemistry ==
Year	Image	Laureate	Birthplace	Motivation
1914		Theodore W. Richards	Philadelphia, Pennsylvania, U.S.	"for their discoveries concerning heart catheterization and pathological changes in the circulatory system"
1932		Irving Langmuir	Brooklyn, New York, U.S.	"for his discoveries and investigations in surface chemistry"
1934		Harold C. Urey	Walkerton, Indiana, U.S.	"for his discovery of heavy hydrogen"
1946		Wendell M. Stanley	Ridgeville, Indiana, U.S.	"for their preparation of enzymes and virus proteins in a pure form"
1946		James B. Sumner	Canton, Massachusetts, U.S.	"for his discovery that enzymes can be crystallized"
1946		John H. Northrop	Yonkers, New York, U.S.	"for their preparation of enzymes and virus proteins in a pure form"
1949		William Giauque	Niagara Falls, Ontario, Canada	"for his contributions in the field of chemical thermodynamics, particularly concerning the behaviour of substances at extremely low temperatures"
1951		Edwin M. McMillan	Redondo Beach, California, U.S.	"for their discoveries in the chemistry of the transuranium elements"
1951		Glenn Theodore Seaborg	Ishpeming, Michigan, U.S.	"for their discoveries in the chemistry of the transuranium elements"
1954		Linus C. Pauling	Portland, Oregon, U.S.	"for his research into the nature of the chemical bond and its application to the elucidation of the structure of complex substances"
1955		Vincent du Vigneaud	Chicago, Illinois, U.S.	"for his work on biochemically important sulphur compounds, especially for the first synthesis of a polypeptide hormone"
1960		Willard F. Libby	Parachute, Colorado, U.S.	"for his method to use carbon-14 for age determination in archaeology, geology, geophysics, and other branches of science"
1961		Melvin Calvin	St. Paul, Minnesota, U.S.	"for his research on the carbon dioxide assimilation in plants"
1965		Robert B. Woodward	Boston, Massachusetts, U.S.	"for his outstanding achievements in the art of organic synthesis"
1966		Robert S. Mulliken	Newburyport, Massachusetts, U.S.	"for his fundamental work concerning chemical bonds and the electronic structure of molecules by the molecular orbital method"
1968		Lars Onsager	Kristiania (Oslo), Norway	"for the discovery of the reciprocal relations bearing his name, which are fundamental for the thermodynamics of irreversible processes"
1972		Christian Anfinsen	Monessen, Pennsylvania, U.S.	"for his work on ribonuclease, especially concerning the connection between the amino acid sequence and the biologically active conformation"
1972		Stanford Moore	Chicago, Illinois, U.S.	"for their contribution to the understanding of the connection between chemical structure and catalytic activity of the active centre of the ribonuclease molecule"
1972		William H. Stein	New York, New York, U.S.	"for their contribution to the understanding of the connection between chemical structure and catalytic activity of the active centre of the ribonuclease molecule"
1974		Paul J. Flory	Sterling, Illinois, U.S.	"for his fundamental achievements, both theoretical and experimental, in the physical chemistry of the macromolecules"
1976		William Lipscomb	Cleveland, Ohio, U.S.	"for his studies on the structure of boranes illuminating problems of chemical bonding"
1979		Herbert C. Brown	London, England, United Kingdom	"for their development of the use of boron- and phosphorus-containing compounds, respectively, into important reagents in organic synthesis"
1980		Walter Gilbert	Boston, Massachusetts, U.S.	"for their contributions concerning the determination of base sequences in nucleic acids"
1980		Paul Berg	New York, New York, U.S.	"for his fundamental studies of the biochemistry of nucleic acids, with particular regard to recombinant-DNA"
1981		Roald Hoffmann	Złoczów, Poland	"for their discoveries concerning the activation of innate immunity"
1983		Henry Taube	Neudorf, Saskatchewan, Canada	"for his work on the mechanisms of electron transfer reactions, especially in metal complexes"
1984		Bruce Merrifield	Fort Worth, Texas, U.S.	"for his development of methodology for chemical synthesis on a solid matrix"
1985		Jerome Karle	New York, New York, U.S.	"for their outstanding achievements in the development of direct methods for the determination of crystal structures"
1985		Herbert A. Hauptman	New York, New York, U.S.	"for their outstanding achievements in the development of direct methods for the determination of crystal structures"
1986		Dudley R. Herschbach	San Jose, California, U.S.	"for their contributions concerning the dynamics of chemical elementary processes"
1986		Yuan T. Lee	Shinchiku City, Shinchiku Prefecture, Taiwan under Japanese rule	"for their discovery of superfluidity in helium-3"
1987		Charles J. Pedersen	Busan, South Korea	"for their development and use of molecules with structure-specific interactions of high selectivity"
1987		Donald J. Cram	Chester, Vermont, U.S.	"for their development and use of molecules with structure-specific interactions of high selectivity"
1989		Sidney Altman	Montreal, Quebec, Canada	"for their discovery of catalytic properties of RNA"
1989		Thomas R. Cech	Chicago, Illinois, U.S.	"for their discovery of catalytic properties of RNA"
1990		Elias James Corey	Methuen, Massachusetts, U.S.	"for his development of the theory and methodology of organic synthesis"
1992		Rudolph A. Marcus	Montreal, Quebec, Canada	"for his contributions to the theory of electron transfer reactions in chemical systems"
1993		Kary B. Mullis	Lenoir, North Carolina, U.S.	"for his invention of the polymerase chain reaction (PCR) method"
1994		George Andrew Olah	Budapest, Hungary	"for his contribution to carbocation chemistry"
1995		Mario J. Molina	Mexico City, Mexico	"for their work in atmospheric chemistry, particularly concerning the formation and decomposition of ozone"
1995		F. Sherwood Rowland	Delaware, Ohio, U.S.	"for their work in atmospheric chemistry, particularly concerning the formation and decomposition of ozone"
1996		Richard E. Smalley	Akron, Ohio, U.S.	"for their discovery of fullerenes"
1996		Robert F. Curl Jr.	Alice, Texas, U.S.	"for their discovery of fullerenes"
1997		Paul D. Boyer	Provo, Utah, U.S.	"for their elucidation of the enzymatic mechanism underlying the synthesis of adenosine triphosphate (ATP)"
1998		Walter Kohn	Vienna, Austria	"for his development of the density-functional theory"
1999		Ahmed H. Zewail	Damanhour, Egypt	"for his studies of the transition states of chemical reactions using femtosecond spectroscopy"
2000		Alan Heeger	Sioux City, Iowa, U.S.	"for the discovery and development of conductive polymers"
2000		Alan MacDiarmid	Masterton, New Zealand	"for the discovery and development of conductive polymers"
2001		William S. Knowles	Taunton, Massachusetts, U.S.	"for their work on chirally catalysed hydrogenation reactions"
2001		K. Barry Sharpless	Philadelphia, Pennsylvania, U.S.	"for his work on chirally catalysed oxidation reactions"
2002		John Bennett Fenn	New York, New York, U.S.	"for their development of soft desorption ionisation methods for mass spectrometric analyses of biological macromolecules"
2003		Peter Agre	Northfield, Minnesota, U.S.	"for the discovery of water channels"
2003		Roderick MacKinnon	Burlington, Massachusetts, U.S.	"for structural and mechanistic studies of ion channels"
2004		Irwin Rose	Brooklyn, New York, U.S.	"for the discovery of ubiquitin-mediated protein degradation"
2005		Robert H. Grubbs	Marshall County, Kentucky, U.S.	"for the development of the metathesis method in organic synthesis"
2005		Richard R. Schrock	Berne, Indiana, U.S.	"for the development of the metathesis method in organic synthesis"
2006		Roger D. Kornberg	St. Louis, Missouri, U.S.	"for their discovery of the mechanisms in the biological synthesis of ribonucleic acid and deoxyribonucleic acid"
2008		Roger Yonchien Tsien	New York, New York, U.S.	"for the discovery and development of the green fluorescent protein, GFP"
2008		Martin Chalfie	Chicago, Illinois, U.S.	"for the discovery and development of the green fluorescent protein, GFP"
2009		Venkatraman Ramakrishnan	Chidambaram, Madras State (now Tamil Nadu), India	"for studies of the structure and function of the ribosome"
2009		Thomas A. Steitz	Milwaukee, Wisconsin, U.S.	"for studies of the structure and function of the ribosome"
2010		Richard F. Heck	Springfield, Massachusetts, U.S.	"for palladium-catalyzed cross couplings in organic synthesis"
2012		Brian K. Kobilka	Little Falls, Minnesota, U.S.	"for studies of G-protein-coupled receptors"
2012		Robert J. Lefkowitz	The Bronx, New York, U.S.	"for studies of G-protein-coupled receptors"
2013		Arieh Warshel	Kibbutz Sde Nahum, British Mandate of Palestine (now Israel)	"for the development of multiscale models for complex chemical systems"
2013		Michael Levitt	Pretoria, South Africa	"for the development of multiscale models for complex chemical systems"
2013		Martin Karplus	Vienna, Austria	"for the development of multiscale models for complex chemical systems"
2014		William E. Moerner	Pleasanton, California, U.S.	"for the development of super-resolved fluorescence microscopy"
2014		Eric Betzig	Ann Arbor, Michigan, U.S.	"for the development of super-resolved fluorescence microscopy"
2015		Paul L. Modrich	Raton, New Mexico, U.S.	"for mechanistic studies of DNA repair"
2015		Aziz Sancar	Savur, Mardin, Turkey	"for mechanistic studies of DNA repair"
2016		Fraser Stoddart	Edinburgh, Scotland, United Kingdom	"for the design and synthesis of molecular machines"
2017		Joachim Frank	Siegen, Germany	"for the discovery and the interpretation of the Cherenkov effect"
2018		George P. Smith	Norwalk, Connecticut, U.S.	"for the invention of an imaging semiconductor circuit – the CCD sensor"
2018		Frances Arnold	Edgewood, Pennsylvania, U.S.	"for the directed evolution of enzymes"
2019		John B. Goodenough	Jena, Germany	"for the development of lithium-ion batteries"
2019		M. Stanley Whittingham	Nottingham, England, United Kingdom	"for the development of lithium-ion batteries"
2020		Jennifer Doudna	Washington, D.C., U.S.	"for the development of a method for genome editing"
2021		David MacMillan	Bellshill, Scotland, United Kingdom	"for the development of asymmetric organocatalysis"
2022		Carolyn R. Bertozzi	Boston, Massachusetts, U.S.	"for the development of click chemistry and bioorthogonal chemistry"
2022		K. Barry Sharpless	Philadelphia, Pennsylvania, U.S.	"for his work on chirally catalysed oxidation reactions"
2023		Louis E. Brus	Cleveland, Ohio, U.S.	"for the discovery and synthesis of quantum dots"
2023		Moungi G. Bawendi	Paris, France	"for the discovery and synthesis of quantum dots"
2024		John M. Jumper	Little Rock, Arkansas, U.S.	“for protein structure prediction”
2024		David Baker	Seattle, Washington, U.S.	"for computational protein design"
2025		Omar M. Yaghi	Amman, Jordan	"for the development of metal–organic frameworks"

== Economics ==
Year	Image	Laureate	Birthplace	Motivation
1970		Paul A. Samuelson	Gary, Indiana, U.S.	"for the scientific work through which he has developed static and dynamic economic theory and actively contributed to raising the level of analysis in economic science"
1971		Simon Kuznets	Pinsk, Russian Empire (now Belarus)	"for his empirically founded interpretation of economic growth which has led to new and deepened insight into the economic and social structure and process of development"
1972		Kenneth J. Arrow	New York City, U.S.	"for their pioneering contributions to general economic equilibrium theory and welfare theory"
1973		Wassily Leontief	Munich, German Empire	"for the development of the input-output method and for its application to important economic problems"
1975		Tjalling C. Koopmans	's-Graveland, Netherlands	"for their contributions to the theory of optimum allocation of resources"
1976		Milton Friedman	Brooklyn, New York City, US	"for his achievements in the fields of consumption analysis, monetary history and theory, and for his demonstration of the complexity of stabilization policy."
1978		Herbert A. Simon	Milwaukee, Wisconsin, U.S.	“for his pioneering research into the decision-making process within economic organizations”
1979		Theodore Schultz	Arlington, South Dakota, US	"for their pioneering research into economic development research with particular consideration of the problems of developing countries"
1980		Lawrence R. Klein	Omaha, Nebraska, U.S.	"for the creation of econometric models and the application to the analysis of economic fluctuations and economic policies"
1981		James Tobin	Champaign, Illinois, U.S.	"for his analysis of financial markets and their relations to expenditure decisions, employment, production and prices"
1982		George J. Stigler	Seattle, Washington, U.S.	"for his seminal studies of industrial structures, functioning of markets and causes and effects of public regulation"
1983		Gérard Debreu	Calais, France	"for having incorporated new analytical methods into economic theory and for his rigorous reformulation of the theory of general equilibrium"
1985		Franco Modigliani	Rome, Kingdom of Italy	"for his pioneering analyses of saving and of financial markets"
1986		James M. Buchanan	Murfreesboro, Tennessee, U.S.	"for his development of the contractual and constitutional bases for the theory of economic and political decision-making"
1987		Robert M. Solow	Brooklyn, New York City, U.S.	"for his contributions to the theory of economic growth"
1990		Merton H. Miller	Boston, Massachusetts, U.S.	"for their pioneering work in the theory of financial economics"
1990		William F. Sharpe	Boston, Massachusetts, US	"for their pioneering work in the theory of financial economics"
1990		Harry M. Markowitz	Chicago, Illinois, U.S.	"for their pioneering work in the theory of financial economics"
1991		Ronald Coase	Willesden, London, England	"for his discovery and clarification of the significance of transaction costs and property rights for the institutional structure and functioning of the economy"
1992		Gary S. Becker	Pottsville, Pennsylvania, U.S.	"for having extended the domain of microeconomic analysis to a wide range of human behaviour and interaction, including nonmarket behaviour"
1993		Robert W. Fogel	New York City, U.S.	"for having renewed research in economic history by applying economic theory and quantitative methods in order to explain economic and institutional change"
1993		Douglass C. North	Cambridge, Massachusetts, U.S.	"for having renewed research in economic history by applying economic theory and quantitative methods in order to explain economic and institutional change"
1994		John Harsanyi	Budapest, Hungary	"for their pioneering analysis of equilibria in the theory of non-cooperative games"
1994		John Forbes Nash	Bluefield, West Virginia, U.S.	"for their pioneering analysis of equilibria in the theory of non-cooperative games"
1995		Robert Lucas Jr.	Yakima, Washington, U.S.	"for having developed and applied the hypothesis of rational expectations, and thereby having transformed macroeconomic analysis and deepened our understanding of economic policy"
1996		William Vickrey	Victoria, British Columbia, Canada	"for their fundamental contributions to the economic theory of incentives under asymmetric information"
1997		Robert C. Merton	New York City, U.S.	"for a new method to determine the value of derivatives"
1997		Myron Scholes	Timmins, Ontario, Canada	"for a new method to determine the value of derivatives"
2000		James J. Heckman	Chicago, Illinois, US	"for his development of theory and methods for analyzing selective samples"
2000		Daniel L. McFadden	Raleigh, North Carolina, U.S.	"for his development of theory and methods for analyzing discrete choice"
2001		Joseph E. Stiglitz	Gary, Indiana, U.S.	"for their analyses of markets with asymmetric information"
2001		George A. Akerlof	New Haven, Connecticut, U.S.	"for their analyses of markets with asymmetric information"
2001		A. Michael Spence	Montclair, New Jersey, US	"for their analyses of markets with asymmetric information"
2002		Daniel Kahneman	Tel Aviv, British Mandate of Palestine (now Israel)	"for having integrated insights from psychological research into economic science, especially concerning human judgment and decision-making under uncertainty"
2002		Vernon L. Smith	Wichita, Kansas, U.S.	"for the invention of an imaging semiconductor circuit – the CCD sensor"
2003		Robert F. Engle	Syracuse, New York, U.S.	"for methods of analyzing economic time series with time-varying volatility (ARCH)"
2004		Edward C. Prescott	Glens Falls, New York, U.S.	"for their contributions to dynamic macroeconomics: the time consistency of economic policy and the driving forces behind business cycles"
2005		Robert Aumann	Frankfurt, Hesse-Nassau, Prussia	"for having enhanced our understanding of conflict and cooperation through game-theory analysis"
2005		Thomas Schelling	Oakland, California, U.S.	"for having enhanced our understanding of conflict and cooperation through game-theory analysis"
2006		Edmund S. Phelps	Evanston, Illinois, U.S.	"for his analysis of intertemporal tradeoffs in macroeconomic policy"
2007		Leonid Hurwicz	Moscow, Russian Republic	"for having laid the foundations of mechanism design theory"
2007		Eric S. Maskin	New York City, US	"for having laid the foundations of mechanism design theory"
2007		Roger B. Myerson	Boston, Massachusetts, US	"for having laid the foundations of mechanism design theory"
2008		Paul Krugman	Albany, New York, U.S.	"for his analysis of trade patterns and location of economic activity"
2009		Elinor Ostrom	Los Angeles, California, U.S.	"for her analysis of economic governance, especially the commons"
2009		Oliver Eaton Williamson	Superior, Wisconsin, U.S.	"for his analysis of economic governance, especially the boundaries of the firm"
2010		Peter A. Diamond	New York City, U.S.	"for their analysis of markets with search frictions"
2010		Dale T. Mortensen	Enterprise, Oregon, US	"for their analysis of markets with search frictions"
2011		Christopher A. Sims	Washington, D.C., U.S.	"for their empirical research on cause and effect in the macroeconomy"
2011		Thomas J. Sargent	Pasadena, California, U.S.	"for their empirical research on cause and effect in the macroeconomy"
2012		Alvin E. Roth	New York City, U.S.	"for the theory of stable allocations and the practice of market design"
2012		Lloyd S. Shapley	Cambridge, Massachusetts, U.S.	"for the theory of stable allocations and the practice of market design"
2013		Robert J. Shiller	Detroit, Michigan, U.S.	"for their empirical analysis of asset prices"
2013		Lars Peter Hansen	Urbana, Illinois, U.S.	"for their empirical analysis of asset prices"
2013		Eugene F. Fama	Boston, Massachusetts, U.S.	"for their empirical analysis of asset prices"
2015		Angus Deaton	Edinburgh, Scotland	"for his analysis of consumption, poverty, and welfare"
2016		Oliver Hart	London, England	"for their contributions to contract theory"
2017		Richard H. Thaler	East Orange, New Jersey, US	"for his contributions to behavioural economics"
2018		Paul Romer	Denver, Colorado, US	"for integrating technological innovations into long-run macroeconomic analysis"
2018		William Nordhaus	Albuquerque, New Mexico, U.S.	"for integrating climate change into long-run macroeconomic analysis"
2019		Abhijit Banerjee	Mumbai, Maharashtra, India	"for their experimental approach to alleviating global poverty"
2019		Esther Duflo	Paris, France	"for their experimental approach to alleviating global poverty"
2019		Michael Kremer	New York City, U.S.	"for their experimental approach to alleviating global poverty"
2020		Robert B. Wilson	Geneva, Nebraska, U.S.	"for his method of making the paths of electrically charged particles visible by condensation of vapour"
2020		Paul R. Milgrom	Detroit, Michigan, U.S.	"for improvements to auction theory and inventions of new auction formats"
2021		David Card	Guelph, Ontario, Canada	"for his empirical contributions to labour economics"
2021		Joshua Angrist	Columbus, Ohio, U.S.	"for their methodological contributions to the analysis of causal relationships"
2021		Guido Imbens	Geldrop, Netherlands	"for their methodological contributions to the analysis of causal relationships"
2022		Ben Bernanke	Augusta, Georgia, U.S.	"for research on banks and financial crises"
2022		Douglas Diamond	Chicago, Illinois, U.S.	"for their analysis of markets with search frictions"
2022		Philip H. Dybvig	Gainesville, Florida, U.S.	"or research on banks and financial crises"
2023		Claudia Goldin	The Bronx, New York City, U.S.	"for having advanced our understanding of women's labour market outcomes"
2024		Daron Acemoglu	Istanbul, Turkey	"for studies of how institutions are formed and affect prosperity"
2024		Simon Johnson	Sheffield, United Kingdom	"for studies of how institutions are formed and affect prosperity"
2024		James A. Robinson	United Kingdom	"for studies of how institutions are formed and affect prosperity"
2025		Joel Mokyr	Netherlands	"for having identified the prerequisites for sustained growth through technological progress."
2026		Robert Hall	Palo Alto, California, U.S.	"for microeconomic foundations of macroeconomic stabilisation"
2026		Michael Dean Woodford	Chicopee, Massachusetts, U.S.	"for microeconomic foundations of macroeconomic stabilisation"

== Literature ==
Year	Image	Laureate	Birthplace	Motivation
1930		Sinclair Lewis	Sauk Centre, Minnesota, United States	"for his vigorous and graphic art of description and his ability to create, with wit and humour, new types of characters"
1936		Eugene O'Neill	New York City, U.S.	"for the power, honesty and deep-felt emotions of his dramatic works, which embody an original concept of tragedy"
1938		Pearl S. Buck	Hillsboro, West Virginia, U.S.	"for her rich and truly epic descriptions of peasant life in China and for her biographical masterpieces"
1948		T. S. Eliot	St. Louis, Missouri, US	"for his outstanding, pioneer contribution to present-day poetry"
1949		William Faulkner	New Albany, Mississippi, U.S.	"for his powerful and artistically unique contribution to the modern American novel"
1954		Ernest Hemingway	Oak Park, Illinois, U.S.	"for his mastery of the art of narrative, most recently demonstrated in The Old Man and the Sea, and for the influence that he has exerted on contemporary style"
1962		John Steinbeck	Salinas, California, U.S.	"for his realistic and imaginative writings, combining as they do sympathetic humour and keen social perception"
1976		Saul Bellow	Lachine, Quebec, Canada	"for the human understanding and subtle analysis of contemporary culture that are combined in his work"
1978		Isaac Bashevis Singer	Leoncin, Congress Poland, Russian Empire	"for his impassioned narrative art which, with roots in a Polish-Jewish cultural tradition, brings universal human conditions to life"
1980		Czesław Miłosz	Šeteniai, Kovno Governorate, Russian Empire	"who with uncompromising clear-sightedness voices man's exposed condition in a world of severe conflicts"
1987		Joseph Brodsky	Leningrad, Russian SFSR, Soviet Union (now Saint Petersburg, Russia)	"for an all-embracing authorship, imbued with clarity of thought and poetic intensity"
1993		Toni Morrison	Lorain, Ohio, U.S.	"who in novels characterized by visionary force and poetic import, gives life to an essential aspect of American reality"
2016		Bob Dylan	Duluth, Minnesota, US	"for having created new poetic expressions within the great American song tradition"
2020		Louise Glück	New York City, U.S.	"for her unmistakable poetic voice that with austere beauty makes individual existence universal"

== Peace ==
Year	Image	Laureate	Birthplace	Motivation
1906		Theodore Roosevelt	New York City, U.S.	"for his role in bringing to an end the bloody war recently waged between two of the world's great powers, Japan and Russia"
1912		Elihu Root	Clinton, New York, U.S.	"for bringing about better understanding between the countries of North and South America and initiating important arbitration agreements between the United States and other countries"
1919		Woodrow Wilson	Staunton, Virginia, U.S.	"for his role as founder of the League of Nations"
1925		Charles G. Dawes	Marietta, Ohio, U.S.	"for his crucial role in bringing about the Dawes Plan"
1929		Frank B. Kellogg	Potsdam, New York, U.S.	"for his crucial role in bringing about the Briand-Kellogg Pact"
1931		Jane Addams	Cedarville, Illinois, U.S.	"for their assiduous effort to revive the ideal of peace and to rekindle the spirit of peace in their own nation and in the whole of mankind"
1931		Nicholas M. Butler	Elizabeth, New Jersey, U.S.	"for their assiduous effort to revive the ideal of peace and to rekindle the spirit of peace in their own nation and in the whole of mankind"
1945		Cordell Hull	Olympus, Tennessee, U.S.	"for his indefatigable work for international understanding and his pivotal role in establishing the United Nations"
1946		Emily G. Balch	Boston, Massachusetts, U.S.	"for her lifelong work for the cause of peace"
1946		John R. Mott	Livingston Manor, Sullivan County, New York, U.S.	"for his contribution to the creation of a peace-promoting religious brotherhood across national boundaries"
1947		American Friends Service Committee	Philadelphia, Pennsylvania, US	"for their pioneering work in the international peace movement and compassionate effort to relieve human suffering, thereby promoting the fraternity between nations"
1950		Ralph J. Bunche	Detroit, Michigan, U.S.	"for his work as mediator in Palestine in 1948–1949"
1953		George C. Marshall	Uniontown, Pennsylvania, U.S.	"for a plan aimed at the economic recovery of Western Europe after World War II"
1962		Linus C. Pauling	Portland, Oregon, U.S.	"for his fight against the nuclear arms race between East and West"
1964		Martin Luther King Jr.	Atlanta, Georgia, U.S.	"for his non-violent struggle for civil rights for the Afro-American population"
1970		Norman Borlaug	Cresco, Iowa, United States	"for having given a well-founded hope – the green revolution"
1973		Henry Kissinger	Fürth, Bavaria, Weimar Republic	"for jointly having negotiated a cease fire in Vietnam in 1973"
1986		Elie Wiesel	Sighet, Kingdom of Romania	"for being a messenger to mankind: his message is one of peace, atonement and dignity"
1997		Jody Williams	Rutland, Vermont, United States	"for their work for the banning and clearing of anti-personnel mines"
2002		Jimmy Carter	Plains, Georgia, U.S.	"for his decades of untiring effort to find peaceful solutions to international conflicts, to advance democracy and human rights, and to promote economic and social development"
2007		Al Gore	Washington, D.C., U.S.	"for their efforts to build up and disseminate greater knowledge about man-made climate change, and to lay the foundations for the measures that are needed to counteract such change"
2009		Barack Obama	Honolulu, Hawaii, U.S.	"for his extraordinary efforts to strengthen international diplomacy and cooperation between peoples"
2021		Maria Ressa	Manila, Philippines	"for their efforts to safeguard freedom of expression, which is a precondition for democracy and lasting peace"

== Physics ==
Year	Image	Laureate	Birthplace	Motivation
1907		Albert A. Michelson	Strelno, Kingdom of Prussia, German Confederation	"for his optical precision instruments and the spectroscopic and metrological investigations carried out with their aid"
1907	Edward W. Morley	Edward W. Morley	Newark, New Jersey, U.S.	"for his optical precision instruments and the spectroscopic and metrological investigations carried out with their aid"
1923		Robert A. Millikan	Morrison, Illinois, U.S.	"for his work on the elementary charge of electricity and on the photoelectric effect"
1927		Arthur H. Compton	Wooster, Ohio, U.S.	"for his discovery of the effect named after him"
1936		Carl David Anderson	New York City, U.S.	"for his discovery of the positron"
1937		Clinton Davisson	Bloomington, Illinois, USA	"for their experimental discovery of the diffraction of electrons by crystals"
1939		Ernest Lawrence	Canton, South Dakota, U.S.	"for the invention and development of the cyclotron and for results obtained with it, especially with regard to artificial radioactive elements"
1943		Otto Stern	Sohrau, Kingdom of Prussia, German Empire (today Żory, Poland)	"for his contribution to the development of the molecular ray method and his discovery of the magnetic moment of the proton"
1944		Isidor Isaac Rabi	Rymanów, Galicia, Austria-Hungary	"for his resonance method for recording the magnetic properties of atomic nuclei"
1946		Percy W. Bridgman	Cambridge, Massachusetts, U.S.	"for the invention of an apparatus to produce extremely high pressures, and for the discoveries he made therewith in the field of high pressure physics"
1952		E. M. Purcell	Taylorville, Illinois, United States	"for their development of new methods for nuclear magnetic precision measurements and discoveries in connection therewith"
1952		Felix Bloch	Zürich, Switzerland	"for their development of new methods for nuclear magnetic precision measurements and discoveries in connection therewith"
1955		Willis E. Lamb	Los Angeles, California, U.S.	"for his discoveries concerning the fine structure of the hydrogen spectrum"
1955		Polykarp Kusch	Blankenburg, District of Blankenburg, Duchy of Brunswick, German Empire	"for his precision determination of the magnetic moment of the electron"
1956		William B. Shockley	London, England	"for their researches on semiconductors and their discovery of the transistor effect"
1956		John Bardeen	Madison, Wisconsin, U.S.	"for their researches on semiconductors and their discovery of the transistor effect"
1956		Walter H. Brattain	Xiamen, Fujian, China	"for their researches on semiconductors and their discovery of the transistor effect"
1957		Chen Ning Yang	Hefei, Republic of China	"for their penetrating investigation of the so-called parity laws which has led to important discoveries regarding the elementary particles"
1957		Tsung-Dao Lee	Shanghai, Republic of China	"for their discovery of superfluidity in helium-3"
1959		Owen Chamberlain	San Francisco, California, U.S.	"for their discovery of the antiproton"
1959		Emilio Segrè	Tivoli, Kingdom of Italy	"for their discovery of the antiproton"
1960		Donald A. Glaser	Cleveland, Ohio, U.S.	"for the invention of the bubble chamber"
1961		Robert Hofstadter	New York City, U.S.	"for his pioneering studies of electron scattering in atomic nuclei and for his thereby achieved discoveries concerning the structure of the nucleons"
1963		Maria Goeppert-Mayer	Kattowitz, German Empire	"for their discoveries concerning nuclear shell structure"
1963		Eugene Wigner	Budapest, Kingdom of Hungary, Austria-Hungary	"for his contributions to the theory of the atomic nucleus and the elementary particles, particularly through the discovery and application of fundamental symmetry principles"
1964		Charles H. Townes	Greenville, South Carolina, US	"for fundamental work in the field of quantum electronics, which has led to the construction of oscillators and amplifiers based on the maser-laser principle"
1965		Richard P. Feynman	New York City, U.S.	"for their fundamental work in quantum electrodynamics, with deep-ploughing consequences for the physics of elementary particles"
1965		Julian Schwinger	New York City, U.S.	"for their fundamental work in quantum electrodynamics, with deep-ploughing consequences for the physics of elementary particles"
1967		Hans Bethe	Strasbourg, Germany	"for his contributions to the theory of nuclear reactions, especially his discoveries concerning the energy production in stars"
1968		Luis Alvarez	San Francisco, California, US	"for his decisive contributions to elementary particle physics, in particular the discovery of a large number of resonance states, made possible through his development of the technique of using hydrogen bubble chamber and data analysis"
1969		Murray Gell-Mann	Manhattan, New York City, U.S.	"for his contributions and discoveries concerning the classification of elementary particles and their interactions"
1972		John Bardeen	Madison, Wisconsin, U.S.	"for their researches on semiconductors and their discovery of the transistor effect"
1972		Leon N. Cooper	Bronx, New York, U.S.	"for their jointly developed theory of superconductivity, usually called the BCS-theory"
1972		Robert Schrieffer	Oak Park, Illinois, U.S.	"for their jointly developed theory of superconductivity, usually called the BCS-theory"
1973		Ivar Giaever	Bergen, Norway	"for their experimental discoveries regarding tunneling phenomena in semiconductors and superconductors, respectively"
1975		Ben Roy Mottelson	Chicago, Illinois, U.S.	"for the discovery of the connection between collective motion and particle motion in atomic nuclei and the development of the theory of the structure of the atomic nucleus based on this connection"
1975		James Rainwater	Council, Idaho, U.S.	"for the discovery of the connection between collective motion and particle motion in atomic nuclei and the development of the theory of the structure of the atomic nucleus based on this connection"
1976		Burton Richter	Brooklyn, New York, U.S.	"for their pioneering work in the discovery of a heavy elementary particle of a new kind"
1976		Samuel C. C. Ting	Ann Arbor, Michigan, U.S.	"for their pioneering work in the discovery of a heavy elementary particle of a new kind"
1977		Philip W. Anderson	Indianapolis, Indiana, U.S.	"for their fundamental theoretical investigations of the electronic structure of magnetic and disordered systems"
1977		John H. van Vleck	Middletown, Connecticut, US	"for their fundamental theoretical investigations of the electronic structure of magnetic and disordered systems"
1978		Robert Woodrow Wilson	Houston, Texas, U.S.	"for their discovery of cosmic microwave background radiation"
1978		Arno Penzias	Munich, Germany	"for their discovery of cosmic microwave background radiation"
1979		Steven Weinberg	New York City, U.S.	"for their contributions to the theory of the unified weak and electromagnetic interaction between elementary particles, including, inter alia, the prediction of the weak neutral current"
1979		Sheldon Glashow	New York City, U.S.	"for their contributions to the theory of the unified weak and electromagnetic interaction between elementary particles, including, inter alia, the prediction of the weak neutral current"
1980		James Cronin	Chicago, Illinois, U.S.	"for the discovery of violations of fundamental symmetry principles in the decay of neutral K-mesons"
1980		Val Fitch	Merriman, Nebraska, U.S.	"for the discovery of violations of fundamental symmetry principles in the decay of neutral K-mesons"
1981		Nicolaas Bloembergen	Dordrecht, Netherlands	"for their contribution to the development of laser spectroscopy"
1981		Arthur L. Schawlow	Mount Vernon, New York, U.S.	"for their contribution to the development of laser spectroscopy"
1982		Kenneth G. Wilson	Waltham, Massachusetts, U.S.	"for his method of making the paths of electrically charged particles visible by condensation of vapour"
1983		William A. Fowler	Pittsburgh, U.S.	"for his theoretical and experimental studies of the nuclear reactions of importance in the formation of the chemical elements in the universe"
1983		Subrahmanyan Chandrasekhar	Lahore, Punjab, British India (present-day Punjab, Pakistan)	"for his theoretical studies of the physical processes of importance to the structure and evolution of the stars"
1988		Leon M. Lederman	New York City, U.S.	"for the neutrino beam method and the demonstration of the doublet structure of the leptons through the discovery of the muon neutrino"
1988		Melvin Schwartz	New York City, U.S.	"for the neutrino beam method and the demonstration of the doublet structure of the leptons through the discovery of the muon neutrino"
1988		Jack Steinberger	Bad Kissingen, Germany	"for the neutrino beam method and the demonstration of the doublet structure of the leptons through the discovery of the muon neutrino"
1989		Hans G. Dehmelt	Görlitz, Germany	"for the development of the ion trap technique"
1989		Norman F. Ramsey	Washington, D.C., U.S.	"for the invention of the separated oscillatory fields method and its use in the hydrogen maser and other atomic clocks"
1990		Jerome I. Friedman	Chicago, Illinois, U.S.	"for their pioneering investigations concerning deep inelastic scattering of electrons on protons and bound neutrons, which have been of essential importance for the development of the quark model in particle physics"
1990		Henry W. Kendall	Boston, Massachusetts, U.S.	"for their discoveries relating to the hormones of the adrenal cortex, their structure and biological effects"
1993		Russell A. Hulse	New York City, U.S.	"for the discovery of a new type of pulsar, a discovery that has opened up new possibilities for the study of gravitation"
1993		Joseph H. Taylor Jr.	Philadelphia, Pennsylvania, U.S.	"for the discovery of a new type of pulsar, a discovery that has opened up new possibilities for the study of gravitation"
1994		Clifford G. Shull	Pittsburgh, Pennsylvania, U.S.	"for the development of the neutron diffraction technique"
1995		Martin L. Perl	New York City, U.S.	"for the discovery of the tau lepton"
1995		Frederick Reines	Paterson, New Jersey, U.S.	"for the detection of the neutrino"
1996		David M. Lee	Rye, New York, U.S.	"for their discovery of superfluidity in helium-3"
1996		Douglas D. Osheroff	Aberdeen, Washington, U.S.	"for their discovery of superfluidity in helium-3"
1996		Robert Coleman Richardson	Washington, D.C., U.S.	"for his work on the thermionic phenomenon and especially for the discovery of the law named after him"
1997		Steven Chu	St. Louis, Missouri, U.S.	"for development of methods to cool and trap atoms with laser light"
1997		William D. Phillips	Wilkes-Barre, Pennsylvania, U.S.	"for development of methods to cool and trap atoms with laser light"
1998		Horst Ludwig Störmer	Frankfurt, Hesse, Allied-occupied Germany	"for their discovery of a new form of quantum fluid with fractionally charged excitations"
1998		Robert B. Laughlin	Visalia, California, United States	"for their discovery of a new form of quantum fluid with fractionally charged excitations"
1998		Daniel C. Tsui	Fan village, Henan, China	"for their discovery of a new form of quantum fluid with fractionally charged excitations"
2000		Jack Kilby	Jefferson City, Missouri, U.S.	"for his part in the invention of the integrated circuit"
2001		Eric A. Cornell	Palo Alto, California, US	"for the achievement of Bose-Einstein condensation in dilute gases of alkali atoms, and for early fundamental studies of the properties of the condensates"
2001		Carl E. Wieman	Corvallis, Oregon, U.S.	"for the achievement of Bose-Einstein condensation in dilute gases of alkali atoms, and for early fundamental studies of the properties of the condensates"
2002		Raymond Davis Jr.	Washington, D.C., United States	"for pioneering contributions to astrophysics, in particular for the detection of cosmic neutrinos"
2002		Riccardo Giacconi	Genoa, Kingdom of Italy	"for pioneering contributions to astrophysics, which have led to the discovery of cosmic X-ray sources"
2003		Anthony J. Leggett	Camberwell, London, England	"for pioneering contributions to the theory of superconductors and superfluids"
2003		Alexei Alexeyevich Abrikosov	Moscow, Russian SFSR, Soviet Union	"for pioneering contributions to the theory of superconductors and superfluids"
2004		David J. Gross	Washington, D.C., U.S.	"for the discovery of asymptotic freedom in the theory of the strong interaction"
2004		H. David Politzer	New York City, U.S.	"for the discovery of asymptotic freedom in the theory of the strong interaction"
2004		Frank Wilczek	Mineola, New York, U.S.	"for the discovery of asymptotic freedom in the theory of the strong interaction"
2005		John L. Hall	Denver, Colorado, US	"for their discoveries of molecular mechanisms controlling the circadian rhythm"
2005		Roy J. Glauber	New York City, U.S.	"for his contribution to the quantum theory of optical coherence"
2006		John C. Mather	Roanoke, Virginia, U.S.	"for their discovery of the blackbody form and anisotropy of the cosmic microwave background radiation"
2006		George F. Smoot	Yukon, Florida, U.S.	"for their discovery of the blackbody form and anisotropy of the cosmic microwave background radiation"
2008		Yoichiro Nambu	Tokyo, Japan	"for the discovery of the mechanism of spontaneous broken symmetry in subatomic physics"
2009		Willard S. Boyle	Amherst, Nova Scotia, Canada	"for the invention of an imaging semiconductor circuit – the CCD sensor"
2009		Charles K. Kao	Shanghai, China	"for groundbreaking achievements concerning the transmission of light in fibers for optical communication"
2009		George E. Smith	White Plains, New York, U.S.	"for the invention of an imaging semiconductor circuit – the CCD sensor"
2011		Saul Perlmutter	Champaign-Urbana, Illinois, US	"for the discovery of the accelerating expansion of the Universe through observations of distant supernovae"
2011		Brian P. Schmidt	Missoula, Montana, United States	"for the discovery of the accelerating expansion of the Universe through observations of distant supernovae"
2011		Adam G. Riess	Washington, D.C., U.S.	"for the discovery of the accelerating expansion of the Universe through observations of distant supernovae"
2012		David J. Wineland	Milwaukee, Wisconsin, United States	"for ground-breaking experimental methods that enable measuring and manipulation of individual quantum systems"
2014		Shuji Nakamura	Ikata, Ehime, Japan	"for the invention of efficient blue light-emitting diodes which has enabled bright and energy-saving white light sources"
2016		F. Duncan M. Haldane	London, England	"for theoretical discoveries of topological phase transitions and topological phases of matter"
2016		John M. Kosterlitz	Aberdeen, Scotland, United Kingdom	"for theoretical discoveries of topological phase transitions and topological phases of matter"
2017		Rainer Weiss	Berlin, Germany	"for decisive contributions to the LIGO detector and the observation of gravitational waves"
2017		Kip Thorne	Logan, Utah, U.S.	"for decisive contributions to the LIGO detector and the observation of gravitational waves"
2017		Barry Barish	Omaha, Nebraska, U.S.	"for decisive contributions to the LIGO detector and the observation of gravitational waves"
2018		Arthur Ashkin	Brooklyn, New York, U.S.	"for the optical tweezers and their application to biological systems"
2019		Jim Peebles	Winnipeg, Manitoba, Canada	"for theoretical discoveries in physical cosmology"
2020		Andrea Ghez	New York City, U.S.	"for the discovery of a supermassive compact object at the centre of our galaxy"
2021		Syukuro Manabe	Shinritsu, Uma, Ehime, Japan	"for the physical modelling of Earth’s climate, quantifying variability and reliably predicting global warming"
2022		John Clauser	Pasadena, California, U.S.	"for experiments with entangled photons, establishing the violation of Bell inequalities and pioneering quantum information science"
2024		John Hopfield	Chicago, Illinois, U.S.	"for foundational discoveries and inventions that enable machine learning with artificial neural networks”
2025		John M. Martinis	U.S.	"for the discovery of macroscopic quantum mechanical tunnelling and energy quantisation in an electric circuit"
2026		Francis Halzen	Tienen, Belgium	“for decisive contributions to the IceCube Neutrino Observatory and the discovery of high-energy neutrinos of astrophysical origin”

== Physiology or Medicine ==
Year	Image	Laureate	Birthplace	Motivation
1933		Thomas H. Morgan	Lexington, Kentucky, US	"for his discoveries concerning the role played by the chromosome in heredity"
1934		George R. Minot	Boston, Massachusetts, U.S.	"for their discoveries concerning liver therapy in cases of anaemia"
1934		William P. Murphy	Stoughton, Wisconsin, U.S.	"for their discoveries concerning liver therapy in cases of anaemia"
1934		George H. Whipple	Ashland, New Hampshire, U.S.	"for their discoveries concerning liver therapy in cases of anaemia"
1943		Edward A. Doisy	Hume, Illinois, US	"for his discovery of the chemical nature of vitamin K"
1944		Joseph Erlanger	San Francisco, California, US	"for their discoveries relating to the highly differentiated functions of single nerve fibres"
1944		Herbert S. Gasser	Platteville, Wisconsin, U.S.	"for their discoveries relating to the highly differentiated functions of single nerve fibres"
1946		Hermann J. Muller	New York City, U.S.	"for the discovery of the production of mutations by means of X-ray irradiation"
1947		Carl Ferdinand Cori	Prague, Austro-Hungarian Empire	"for their discovery of the course of the catalytic conversion of glycogen"
1947		Gerty Cori	Prague, Bohemia, Austro-Hungarian Empire	"for their discovery of the course of the catalytic conversion of glycogen"
1950		Philip S. Hench	Pittsburgh, Pennsylvania, US	"for their discoveries relating to the hormones of the adrenal cortex, their structure and biological effects"
1950		Edward C. Kendall	South Norwalk, Connecticut, United States	"for their discoveries relating to the hormones of the adrenal cortex, their structure and biological effects"
1952		Selman A. Waksman	Nova Pryluka (near Vinnytsia), Kiev Governorate, Russian Empire (now Ukraine)	"for his discovery of streptomycin, the first antibiotic effective against tuberculosis"
1953		Fritz Albert Lipmann	Königsberg, German Empire (present-day Kaliningrad, Russia)	"for his discovery of co-enzyme A and its importance for intermediary metabolism"
1954		John F. Enders	West Hartford, Connecticut, U.S.	"for their discovery of the ability of poliomyelitis viruses to grow in cultures of various types of tissue"
1954		Frederick C. Robbins	Auburn, Alabama, U.S.	"for their discovery of the ability of poliomyelitis viruses to grow in cultures of various types of tissue"
1954		Thomas H. Weller	Ann Arbor, Michigan, U.S.	"for their discovery of the ability of poliomyelitis viruses to grow in cultures of various types of tissue"
1956		Dickinson W. Richards	Orange, New Jersey, U.S.	"for their discoveries concerning heart catheterization and pathological changes in the circulatory system"
1956		André F. Cournand	Paris, France	"for their discoveries concerning heart catheterization and pathological changes in the circulatory system"
1958		George Beadle	Wahoo, Nebraska, U.S.	"for their discovery that genes act by regulating definite chemical events"
1958		Joshua Lederberg	Montclair, New Jersey, U.S.	"for his discoveries concerning genetic recombination and the organization of the genetic material of bacteria"
1958		Edward Tatum	Boulder, Colorado, United States	"for their discovery that genes act by regulating definite chemical events"
1959		Arthur Kornberg	New York City, U.S.	"for their discovery of the mechanisms in the biological synthesis of ribonucleic acid and deoxyribonucleic acid"
1959		Severo Ochoa	Luarca, Asturias, Spain	"for their discovery of the mechanisms in the biological synthesis of ribonucleic acid and deoxyribonucleic acid"
1961		Georg von Békésy	Budapest, Kingdom of Hungary	"for his discoveries of the physical mechanism of stimulation within the cochlea"
1962		James D. Watson	Chicago, Illinois, U.S.	"for their discoveries concerning the molecular structure of nucleic acids and its significance for information transfer in living material"
1964		Konrad Bloch	Neisse, Kingdom of Prussia, German Empire	"for their development of new methods for nuclear magnetic precision measurements and discoveries in connection therewith"
1966		Charles B. Huggins	Halifax, Nova Scotia, Canada	"for his discoveries concerning hormonal treatment of prostatic cancer"
1966		Francis Peyton Rous	Baltimore, Maryland, U.S.	"for his discovery of tumour-inducing viruses"
1967		Haldan Keffer Hartline	Bloomsburg, Pennsylvania, US	"for their discoveries concerning the primary physiological and chemical visual processes in the eye"
1967		George Wald	New York City, U.S.	"for their discoveries concerning the primary physiological and chemical visual processes in the eye"
1968		Robert W. Holley	Urbana, Illinois, U.S.	"for their interpretation of the genetic code and its function in protein synthesis"
1968		Har Gobind Khorana	Raipur, Multan, Punjab Province, British India (present day Punjab, Pakistan)	"for their interpretation of the genetic code and its function in protein synthesis"
1968		Marshall Warren Nirenberg	New York City, U.S.	"for their interpretation of the genetic code and its function in protein synthesis"
1969		Max Delbrück	Berlin, German Empire	"for their discoveries concerning the replication mechanism and the genetic structure of viruses"
1969		Alfred Hershey	Owosso, Michigan, US	"for their discoveries concerning the replication mechanism and the genetic structure of viruses"
1969		Salvador Luria	Turin, Kingdom of Italy	"for their discoveries concerning the replication mechanism and the genetic structure of viruses"
1970		Julius Axelrod	New York City, USA	"for their discoveries concerning the humoral transmitters in the nerve terminals and the mechanism for their storage, release and inactivation"
1971		Earl W. Sutherland Jr.	Burlingame, Kansas, U.S.	"for his discoveries concerning the mechanisms of the action of hormones"
1972		Gerald Edelman	Ozone Park, Queens, New York, U.S.	"for their discoveries concerning the chemical structure of antibodies"
1974		George E. Palade	Iași, Romania	"for their discoveries concerning the structural and functional organization of the cell"
1975		David Baltimore	New York City, U.S.	"for their discoveries concerning the interaction between tumour viruses and the genetic material of the cell"
1975		Renato Dulbecco	Catanzaro, Italy	"for their discoveries concerning the interaction between tumour viruses and the genetic material of the cell"
1975		Howard Martin Temin	Philadelphia, Pennsylvania, U.S.	"for their discoveries concerning the interaction between tumour viruses and the genetic material of the cell"
1976		Baruch S. Blumberg	Brooklyn, New York City, U.S.	"for their discoveries concerning new mechanisms for the origin and dissemination of infectious diseases"
1976		Daniel Carleton Gajdusek	Yonkers, New York, U.S.	"for their discoveries concerning new mechanisms for the origin and dissemination of infectious diseases"
1977		Roger Guillemin	Dijon, France	"for their discoveries concerning the peptide hormone production of the brain"
1977		Andrew Schally	Wilno, Poland	"for their discoveries concerning the peptide hormone production of the brain"
1977		Rosalyn Yalow	New York City, U.S.	"for the development of radioimmunoassays of peptide hormones"
1978		Hamilton O. Smith	New York City, U.S.	"for the invention of an imaging semiconductor circuit – the CCD sensor"
1978		Daniel Nathans	Wilmington, Delaware, U.S.	"for the discovery of restriction enzymes and their application to problems of molecular genetics"
1979		Allan M. Cormack	Johannesburg, South Africa	"for the development of computer assisted tomography"
1980		Baruj Benacerraf	Caracas, Venezuela	"for their discoveries concerning genetically determined structures on the cell surface that regulate immunological reactions"
1980		George D. Snell	Bradford, Massachusetts, U.S.	"for their discoveries concerning genetically determined structures on the cell surface that regulate immunological reactions"
1981		David H. Hubel	Windsor, Ontario, Canada	"for their discoveries concerning information processing in the visual system"
1981		Roger W. Sperry	Hartford, Connecticut, U.S.	"for his discoveries concerning the functional specialization of the cerebral hemispheres"
1983		Barbara McClintock	Hartford, Connecticut, U.S.	"for her discovery of mobile genetic elements"
1985		Michael S. Brown	Brooklyn, New York, United States	"for their development of the use of boron- and phosphorus-containing compounds, respectively, into important reagents in organic synthesis"
1985		Joseph L. Goldstein	Kingstree, South Carolina, U.S.	"for their discoveries concerning the regulation of cholesterol metabolism"
1986		Stanley Cohen	Brooklyn, New York, U.S.	"for their discoveries of growth factors"
1986		Rita Levi-Montalcini	Turin, Italy	"for their discoveries of growth factors"
1988		Gertrude B. Elion	New York City, United States	"for their discoveries of important principles for drug treatment"
1988		George H. Hitchings	Hoquiam, Washington, U.S.	"for their discoveries of important principles for drug treatment"
1989		J. Michael Bishop	York, Pennsylvania, U.S.	"for their discovery of the cellular origin of retroviral oncogenes"
1989		Harold E. Varmus	Oceanside, New York, US	"for their discovery of the cellular origin of retroviral oncogenes"
1990		Joseph E. Murray	Milford, Massachusetts, U.S.	"for their discoveries concerning organ and cell transplantation in the treatment of human disease"
1990		E. Donnall Thomas	Mart, Texas, United States	"for their discoveries concerning organ and cell transplantation in the treatment of human disease"
1992		Edmond H. Fischer	Shanghai International Settlement, Shanghai, China	"for their discoveries concerning reversible protein phosphorylation as a biological regulatory mechanism"
1992		Edwin G. Krebs	Lansing, Iowa, U.S.	"for their discoveries concerning reversible protein phosphorylation as a biological regulatory mechanism"
1993		Phillip A. Sharp	Falmouth, Kentucky, U.S.	"for their discoveries of split genes"
1994		Alfred G. Gilman	New Haven, Connecticut, U.S.	"for their discovery of G-proteins and the role of these proteins in signal transduction in cells"
1994		Martin Rodbell	Baltimore, Maryland, U.S.	"for their discovery of G-proteins and the role of these proteins in signal transduction in cells"
1995		Edward B. Lewis	Wilkes-Barre, Pennsylvania, US	"for their discoveries concerning the genetic control of early embryonic development"
1995		Eric F. Wieschaus	South Bend, Indiana, U.S.	"for their discoveries concerning the genetic control of early embryonic development"
1997		Stanley B. Prusiner	Des Moines, Iowa, United States	"for his discovery of Prions – a new biological principle of infection"
1998		Robert F. Furchgott	Charleston, South Carolina, U.S.	"for their discoveries concerning nitric oxide as a signalling molecule in the cardiovascular system"
1998		Louis J. Ignarro	Brooklyn, NY, U.S.	"for their discoveries concerning nitric oxide as a signalling molecule in the cardiovascular system"
1998		Ferid Murad	Whiting, Indiana, U.S.	"for their discoveries concerning nitric oxide as a signalling molecule in the cardiovascular system"
1999		Günter Blobel	Waltersdorf (currently Niegosławice), Lower Silesia, Germany	"for the discovery that proteins have intrinsic signals that govern their transport and localization in the cell"
2000		Paul Greengard	New York City, U.S.	"for their discoveries concerning signal transduction in the nervous system"
2000		Eric Kandel	Vienna, Austria	"for their discoveries concerning signal transduction in the nervous system"
2001		Leland H. Hartwell	Los Angeles, California, U.S.	"for their discoveries of key regulators of the cell cycle"
2002		Sydney Brenner	Germiston, Transvaal, Union of South Africa	"for their discoveries concerning genetic regulation of organ development and programmed cell death'"
2002		H. Robert Horvitz	Chicago, Illinois, US	"for their discoveries concerning genetic regulation of organ development and programmed cell death'"
2003		Paul C. Lauterbur	Sidney, Ohio, U.S.	"for their discoveries concerning magnetic resonance imaging"
2004		Richard Axel	New York City, US	"for their discoveries of odorant receptors and the organization of the olfactory system"
2004		Linda B. Buck	Seattle, Washington, U.S.	"for their discoveries of odorant receptors and the organization of the olfactory system"
2006		Andrew Z. Fire	Palo Alto, California, U.S.	"for their discovery of RNA interference – gene silencing by double-stranded RNA"
2006		Craig C. Mello	New Haven, Connecticut, US	"for their discovery of RNA interference – gene silencing by double-stranded RNA"
2007		Mario R. Capecchi	Verona, Italy	"for their discoveries of principles for introducing specific gene modifications in mice by the use of embryonic stem cells"
2007		Oliver Smithies	Halifax, West Yorkshire, England	"for their discoveries of principles for introducing specific gene modifications in mice by the use of embryonic stem cells"
2009		Elizabeth Blackburn	Hobart, Tasmania, Australia	"for the discovery of how chromosomes are protected by telomeres and the enzyme telomerase"
2009		Carol W. Greider	San Diego, California, U.S.	"for the discovery of how chromosomes are protected by telomeres and the enzyme telomerase"
2009		Jack W. Szostak	London, United Kingdom	"for the discovery of how chromosomes are protected by telomeres and the enzyme telomerase"
2011		Ralph M. Steinman	Montreal, Quebec, Canada	"for his discovery of the dendritic cell and its role in adaptive immunity"
2011		Bruce Beutler	Chicago, Illinois, U.S.	"for their discoveries concerning the activation of innate immunity"
2013		Randy Schekman	Saint Paul, Minnesota, U.S.	"for their discoveries of machinery regulating vesicle traffic, a major transport system in our cells"
2013		Thomas C. Südhof	Göttingen, Germany	"for their discoveries of machinery regulating vesicle traffic, a major transport system in our cells"
2013		James Rothman	Haverhill, Massachusetts, US	"for their discoveries of machinery regulating vesicle traffic, a major transport system in our cells"
2014		John O'Keefe	New York City, U.S.	"for their discoveries of cells that constitute a positioning system in the brain"
2015		William C. Campbell	Ramelton, County Donegal, Ireland	"for their discoveries concerning a novel therapy against infections caused by roundworm parasites"
2017		Michael W. Young	Miami, Florida, U.S.	"for their discoveries of molecular mechanisms controlling the circadian rhythm"
2017		Michael Rosbash	Kansas City, Missouri, U.S.	"for their discoveries of molecular mechanisms controlling the circadian rhythm"
2017		Jeffrey C. Hall	New York City, U.S.	"for their discoveries of molecular mechanisms controlling the circadian rhythm"
2018		James Allison	Alice, Texas, U.S.	"for their discovery of cancer therapy by inhibition of negative immune regulation"
2019		William Kaelin Jr.	New York City, U.S.	"for their discoveries of how cells sense and adapt to oxygen availability"
2019		Gregg L. Semenza	New York City. New York, U.S.	"for their discoveries of how cells sense and adapt to oxygen availability"
2020		Harvey J. Alter	New York City, U.S.	"for the discovery of Hepatitis C virus"
2020		Charles M. Rice	Sacramento, California, U.S.	"for the discovery of Hepatitis C virus"
2021		David Julius	New York City, U.S.	"for their discoveries of receptors for temperature and touch"
2021		Ardem Patapoutian	Beirut, Lebanon	"for their discoveries of receptors for temperature and touch"
2023		Drew Weissman	Lexington, Massachusetts, U.S.	"for their discoveries concerning nucleoside base modifications that enabled the development of effective mRNA vaccines against COVID-19"
2023		Katalin Karikó	Szolnok, Hungary	"for their discoveries concerning nucleoside base modifications that enabled the development of effective mRNA vaccines against COVID-19"
2024		Victor Ambros	Hanover, New Hampshire, U.S.	"for the discovery of microRNA and its role in post-transcriptional gene regulation"
2024		Gary Ruvkun	Berkeley, California, U.S.	"for the discovery of microRNA and its role in post-transcriptional gene regulation"
2025		Mary E. Brunkow	Portland, Oregon, U.S.	"for their discoveries concerning peripheral immune tolerance"
2025		Fred Ramsdell	Elmhurst, Illinois, U.S.	"for their discoveries concerning peripheral immune tolerance"
2026		Karl Deisseroth	Boston, Massachusetts, U.S.	"for their discoveries concerning light-gated ion channels and optogenetics"
