= James D. Griffin (oncologist) =

American onocologist

- Born: James Douglas Griffin; Syracuse, New York
- Education: Brown University; Harvard Medical School
- Scientific career
- Workplaces: Dana–Farber Cancer Institute; Harvard Medical School; Brigham and Women's Hospital

James D. Griffin is an American physician-scientist. He is currently Professor of Medicine at Harvard Medical School, Chair of Medical Oncology at Dana–Farber Cancer Institute, and Director of Medical Oncology at Brigham and Women's Hospital. He is considered an expert in medical oncology and is widely recognized for his research in the clinical and biologic aspects of hemotologic malignancies.

== Education and career ==
He completed a Bachelor of Arts at Brown University in 1970 and earned an M.D. from Harvard Medical School in 1974. Griffin completed his residency at Johns Hopkins Hospital, a hematology fellowship at Massachusetts General Hospital, and a medical oncology fellowship at Dana–Farber Cancer Institute.

He is on the scientific advisory boards of Phio Pharmaceuticals, the Georgetown Lombardi Comprehensive Cancer Center, and the Johns Hopkins Cancer Center.

Griffin was born in Syracuse, New York. He is a seventh-generation Irish American.
