= Rosalind Lee =

Biomedical scientist

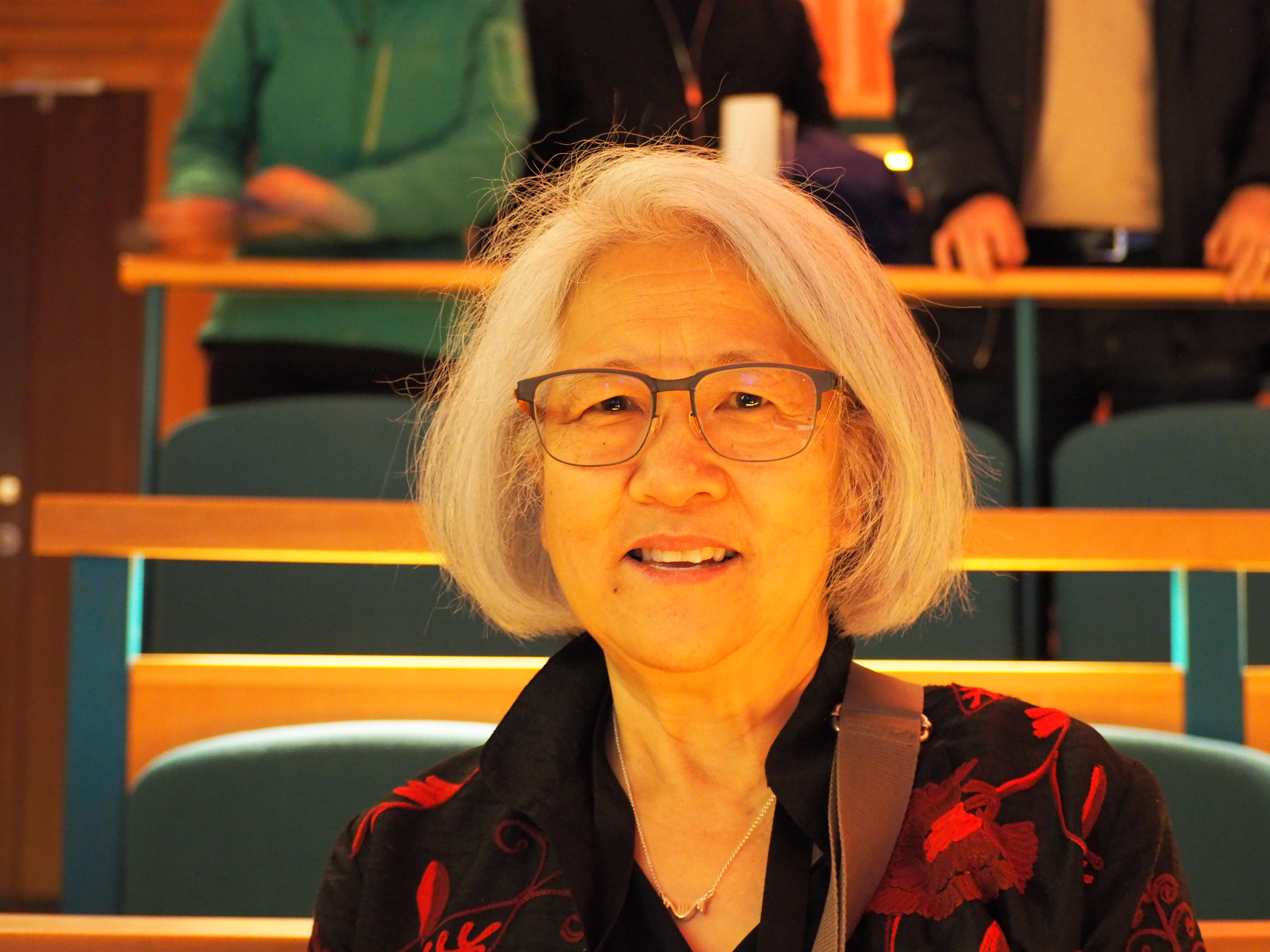
- Rosalind Lee 2024
- Education: Massachusetts Institute of Technology
- Known for: Discovery of microRNA
- Awards: Newcomb Cleveland Prize (2003)
- Scientific career
- Workplaces: Harvard University; Dartmouth College; UMass Chan Medical School

Rosalind 'Candy' Lee is a biomedical scientist, best known for her breakthrough paper on the discovery of microRNA which was published in 1993. In 2002, Lee was joint recipient of the Newcomb Cleveland Prize, for the best paper published in the journal Science that year. In 2024, Lee's 1993 paper was cited as the seminal discovery for which the Nobel Prize in Physiology or Medicine was awarded that year, to co-author Victor Ambros, her husband.

== Career ==
Lee graduated from Massachusetts Institute of Technology in 1976. That same year, she married Victor Ambros, who was at that time a PhD student at MIT.

Lee began working as a research assistant in Victor Ambros' lab in 1987. Her work on the cloning of lin-4 began in January, 1989, in Ambros's lab at Harvard University, and she was joined on the project in the fall of 1989 by Rhonda Feinbaum, a postdoc. Lee and Feinbaum worked for a couple of years in a labor-intensive search for a gene behind a mutation. What they eventually discovered was microRNA, adding a new mechanism for gene regulation. The 1993 paper was soon accepted for publication, and in a change of journal policy, it was published with a notice on the front page that it was jointly first-authored by Lee and Feinbaum, clarifying that both contributed equally to the research. In a 2004 paper, Lee, Feinbaum and Ambros describe how they eventually wrote up the work in 1993, and submitted it to the journal Cell, in parallel with a related paper by Gary Ruvkun.

Lee's co-authored 1993 paper is widely regarded as the seminal contribution in the discovery of microRNA, for which her husband Ambros and Ruvkun were both awarded the Nobel Prize in 2024. The Nobel announcement provoked interest into the question of why Lee hadn't also been recognized with the award.

As of 2024, Lee is a Senior Scientist, in Program in Molecular Medicine, Dr. Victor Ambros's Molecular Medicine Laboratory, at UMass Chan Medical School.

== Awards ==
- 2002 Newcomb Cleveland Prize of the American Association for the Advancement of Science. Co-recipient for her first-author paper in Science that reported the discovery of 15 new microRNA genes in C. elegans.
