= Victor Ambros =

American developmental biologist (born 1953)

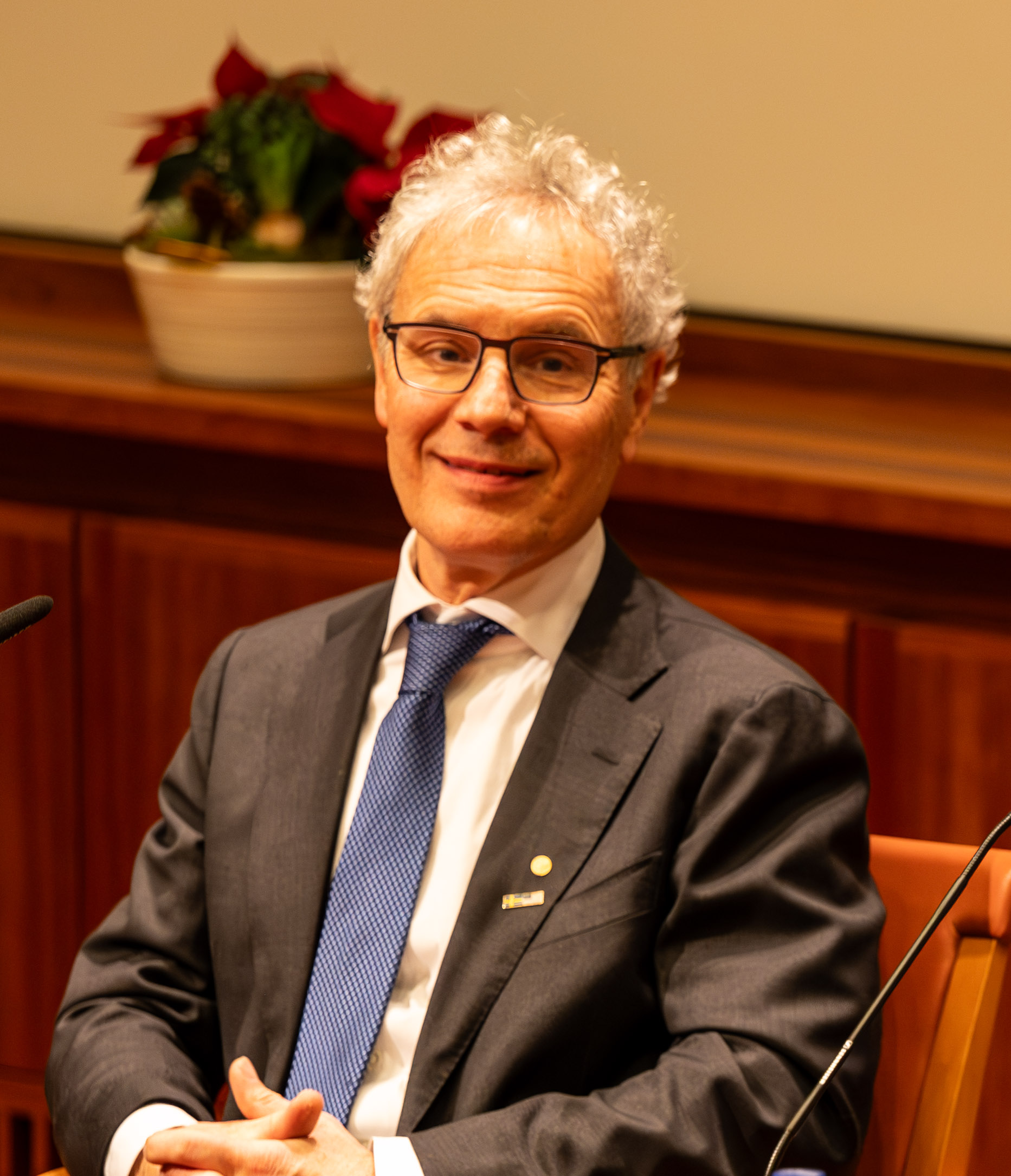
- Ambros in 2024
- Born: Victor Robert Ambros; December 1, 1953 (age 72); Hanover, New Hampshire, U.S.
- Citizenship: American, Polish
- Education: Massachusetts Institute of Technology (BS, PhD)
- Known for: Discovery of microRNA
- Awards: Louisa Gross Horwitz Prize (2009); Wolf Prize in Medicine (2014); Nobel Prize in Physiology or Medicine (2024)
- Scientific career
- Fields: Biology
- Workplaces: Massachusetts Institute of Technology Center for Cancer Research (1975–1976); Massachusetts Institute of Technology (1976–1979); Harvard University (1985–1992); Dartmouth College (1992–2001); Dartmouth Medical School (2001–2007); UMass Chan Medical School (2008–present)
- Thesis: The Protein Covalently Linked to the 5'-end of Poliovirus RNA (1979)
- Doctoral advisor: David Baltimore
- Website: Official website

Victor Robert Ambros (born December 1, 1953) is an American developmental biologist, who discovered the first known microRNA (miRNA). He is a professor at the UMass Chan Medical School. He completed both his undergraduate and doctoral studies at the Massachusetts Institute of Technology. Ambros received the Nobel Prize in Physiology or Medicine in 2024 for his research on microRNA.

== Biography ==
=== Early life and education ===
Ambros was born in Hanover, New Hampshire. His father, Longin Bohdan Ambros, was a Polish citizen born in 1923 in Dordziszki, then part of Second Polish Republic (now in Belarus); and attended Sigismund Augustus Gymnasium in Vilnius 1937–1939. As a teenager, Longin Ambros was deported to Nazi Germany, where he was forced to work in a factory during World War II. At the end of war his father joined United States Army as an interpreter, and emigrated to the United States in 1946. In March 2026, Victor Ambros began applying for Polish citizenship, which he was granted in September the same year. Victor grew up on a small dairy farm in Hartland, Vermont, in a family of eight children and attended Woodstock Union High School.

From the Massachusetts Institute of Technology, Ambros received a Bachelor of Science with a major in biology in 1975 and a Doctor of Philosophy in biology in 1979. His doctoral supervisor was David Baltimore, a 1975 Nobel laureate in Physiology or Medicine. Ambros continued his research at MIT as the first postdoctoral fellow in the lab of future Nobel laureate H. Robert Horvitz.

=== Career ===
Ambros became a faculty member at Harvard University in 1984. However, Harvard denied tenure to Ambros shortly after he discovered what is now known as microRNA. About this, Baltimore later said in 2008: "They lost a potential Nobel laureate because they simply didn't see in him the potential that he had ... It's the nature of a seminal discovery that it's seminal in retrospect. You can't know ahead of time."

Ambros joined the faculty of Dartmouth College in 1992. He joined the faculty at the University of Massachusetts Medical School in 2008, and currently holds the title of Silverman Professor of Natural Sciences in the program in Molecular Medicine, endowed by his former Dartmouth student, Howard Scott Silverman.

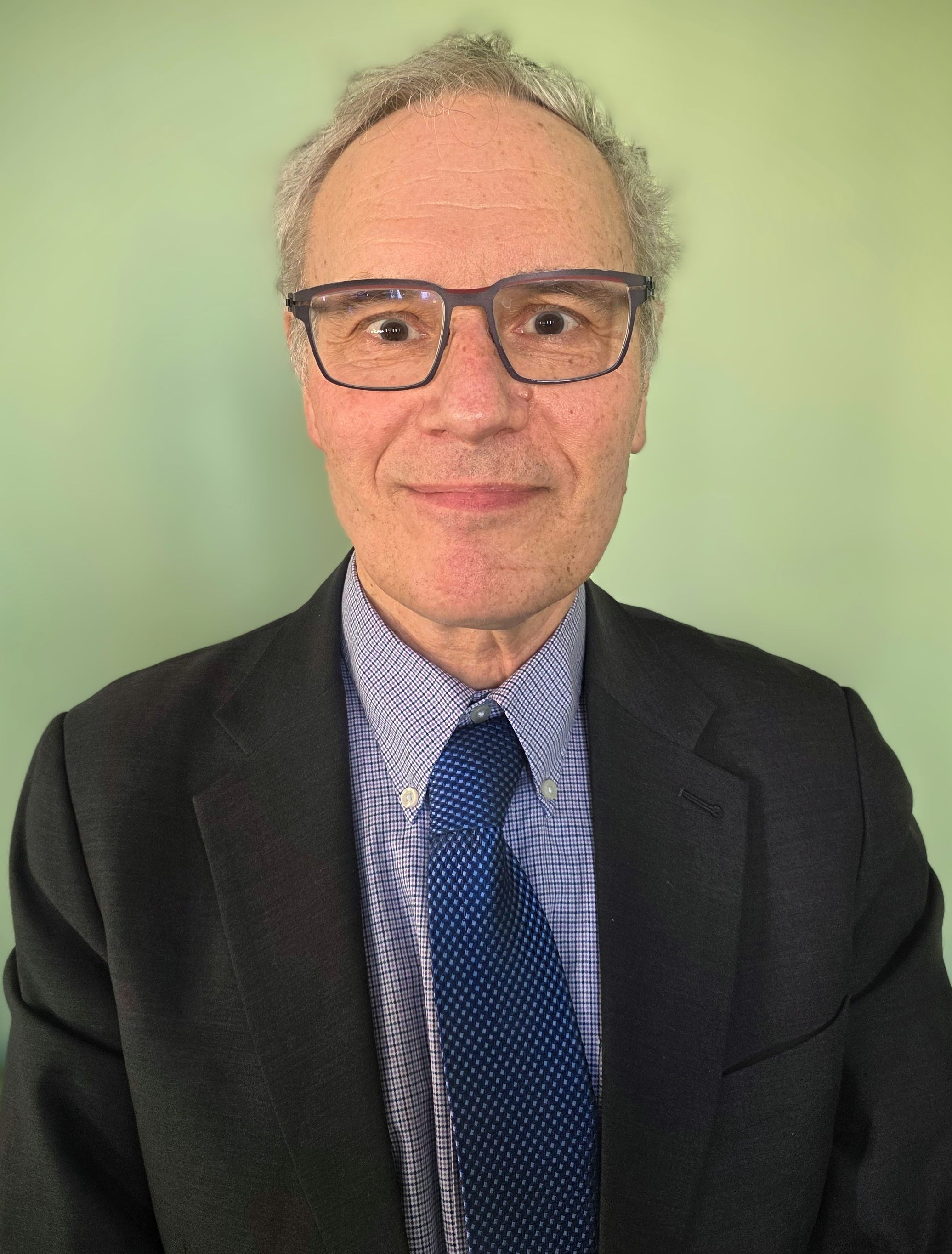
Ambros in 2026 at the Polish Academy of Sciences lecture

== Research ==
In 1993, Ambros and his co-workers Rosalind Lee and Rhonda Feinbaum reported in the journal Cell that they had discovered single-stranded non-protein-coding regulatory RNA molecules in the organism C. elegans. Previous research, including work by Ambros and Horvitz, had revealed that a gene known as lin-4 was important for normal larval development of C. elegans, a nematode often studied as a model organism. Specifically, lin-4 was responsible for the progressive repression of the protein LIN-14 during larval development of the worm; mutant worms deficient in lin-4 function had persistently high levels of LIN-14 and displayed developmental timing defects.

Ambros and colleagues found that lin-4, unexpectedly, did not encode a regulatory protein. Instead, it gave rise to some small RNA molecules, 22 and 61 nucleotides in length, which Ambros called lin-4S (short) and lin-4L (long). Sequence analysis showed that lin-4S was part of lin-4L: lin-4L was predicted to form a stem-loop structure, with lin-4S contained in one of the arms, the 5' arm. Furthermore, Ambros, together with Gary Ruvkun (Harvard), discovered that lin-4S was partially complementary to several sequences in the 3' untranslated region of the messenger RNA encoding the LIN-14 protein. Ambros and colleagues hypothesized and later determined that lin-4 could regulate LIN-14 through binding of lin-4S to these sequences in the lin-14 transcript in a type of antisense RNA mechanism.

In 2000, another C. elegans small RNA regulatory molecule, let-7, was characterized by the Ruvkun lab and found to be conserved in many species, including vertebrates. These discoveries, among others, confirmed that Ambros had in fact discovered a class of small RNAs with conserved functions, now known as microRNA.

Ambros was elected to the United States National Academy of Sciences in 2007. He was elected a Fellow of the American Academy of Arts and Sciences in 2011. In 2024 he shared the Nobel Prize in Physiology and Medicine with Gary Ruvkun "for the discovery of microRNA and its role in post-transcriptional gene regulation".

== Awards ==
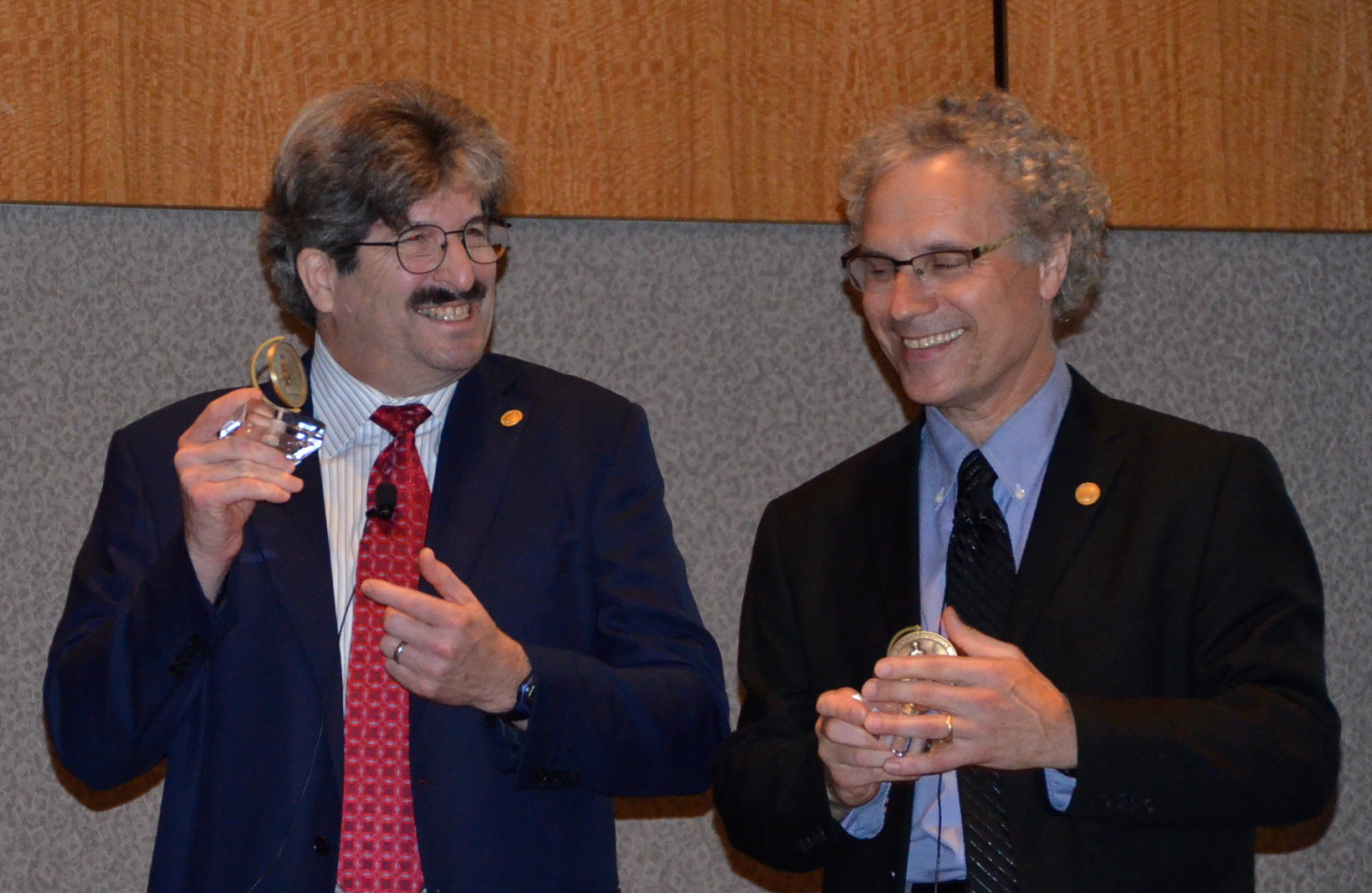
Ambros received Gruber Prize in Genetics alongside Gary Ruvkun in 2014.

- 2002: Newcomb Cleveland Prize of the American Association for the Advancement of Science for the most outstanding paper published in Science (co-recipient with the laboratories of David P. Bartel and Thomas Tuschl)
- 2004: Lewis S. Rosenstiel Award for Distinguished Work in Medical Research of Brandeis University (co-recipient with Craig Mello, Andrew Fire, and Gary Ruvkun)
- 2006: Genetics Society of America Medal for outstanding contributions in the past 15 years
- 2007: Elected to the National Academy of Sciences
- 2008: Gairdner Foundation International Award (co-recipient)
- 2008: Benjamin Franklin Medal in Life Science of The Franklin Institute (co-recipient with Gary Ruvkun and David Baulcombe)
- 2008: The Albert Lasker Award for Basic Medical Research (co-recipient with Gary Ruvkun and David Baulcombe)
- 2008: Massachusetts General Hospital Warren Triennial Prize (co-recipient with Gary Ruvkun)
- 2009: Dickson Prize from University of Pittsburgh in medicine
- 2009: Louisa Gross Horwitz Prize from Columbia University (co-recipient with Gary Ruvkun)
- 2009: Massry Prize from University of Southern California (co-recipient with Gary Ruvkun)
- 2012: Dr. Paul Janssen Award for Biomedical Research from Johnson & Johnson (co-recipient with Gary Ruvkun)
- 2013: Keio Medical Science Prize from Keio University (co-recipient with Shigekazu Nagata)
- 2014: Gruber Prize in Genetics from Gruber Foundation (co-recipient with Gary Ruvkun and David Baulcombe)
- 2014: Wolf Prize in Medicine from Wolf Foundation (co-recipient with Gary Ruvkun and Nahum Sonenberg)
- 2015: Breakthrough Prize in Life Sciences
- 2016: March of Dimes Prize in Developmental Biology (co-recipient with Gary Ruvkun)
- 2024: Nobel Prize in Physiology or Medicine (co-recipient with Gary Ruvkun)
