= Wiley Prize =

American award in biology and medicine

The Wiley Prize in Biomedical Sciences is intended to recognize breakthrough research in pure or applied life science research that is distinguished by its excellence, originality and impact on our understanding of biological systems and processes. The award may recognize a specific contribution or series of contributions that demonstrate the nominee's significant leadership in the development of research concepts or their clinical application. Particular emphasis will be placed on research that champions novel approaches and challenges accepted thinking in the biomedical sciences.

The Wiley Foundation, established in 2001, is the endowing body that supports the Wiley Prize in Biomedical Sciences.

This international award is presented annually and consists of a $35,000 prize and a luncheon in honor of the recipient. The award is presented at a ceremony at The Rockefeller University, where the recipient delivers an honorary lecture as part of the Rockefeller University Lecture Series.

As of 2016, six recipients have gone on to be awarded the Nobel Prize in Physiology or Medicine.

== Award recipients ==
Source: Wiley Foundation

2002

H. Robert Horvitz of the Massachusetts Institute of Technology and Stanley J. Korsmeyer of the Dana Farber Cancer Institute – For his seminal research on programmed cell death and the discovery that a genetic pathway accounts for the programmed cell death within an organism, and Korsmeyer was chosen for his discovery of the relationship between human lymphomas and the fundamental biological process of apoptosis. Korsmeyer's experiments established that blocking cell death plays a primary role in cancer.

2003

Andrew Z. Fire, of both the Carnegie Institution of Washington and the Johns Hopkins University; Craig C. Mello, of the University of Massachusetts Medical School; Thomas Tuschl, formerly of the Max-Planck Institute for Biophysical Chemistry in Goettingen, Germany, and most recently of The Rockefeller University; and David Baulcombe, of the Sainsbury Laboratory at the John Innes Centre in Norwich, England – For contributions to discoveries of novel mechanisms for regulating gene expression by small interfering RNAs (siRNA).

2004

C. David Allis, Ph.D., Joy and Jack Fishman, Professor, Laboratory of Chromatin Biology and Epigenetics at the Rockefeller University in New York – For the significant discovery that transcription factors can enzymatically modify histones to regulate gene activity.

2005

Peter Walter, a Howard Hughes Medical Institute investigator, and Professor and Chairman of the Department of Biochemistry & Biophysics at the University of California San Francisco, and Kazutoshi Mori, a professor of biophysics, in the Graduate School of Science at Kyoto University, in Japan – For the discovery of the novel pathway by which cells regulate the capacity of their intracellular compartments to produce correctly folded proteins for export.

2006

Elizabeth H. Blackburn, Morris Herztein Professor of Biology and Physiology in the Department of Biochemistry and Biophysics at the University of California, San Francisco, and Carol Greider, Daniel Nathans Professor and Director of Molecular Biology & Genetics at Johns Hopkins University – For the discovery of telomerase, the enzyme that maintains chromosomal integrity and the recognition of its importance in aging, cancer and stem cell biology.

2007

F. Ulrich Hartl, Director at the Max Planck Institute of Biochemistry, in Munich, Germany, and Arthur L. Horwich, Eugene Higgins Professor of Genetics and Pediatrics at the Yale University School of Medicine, and Investigator, Howard Hughes Medical Institute. – For elucidation of the molecular machinery that guides proteins into their proper functional shape, thereby preventing the accumulation of protein aggregates that underlie many diseases, such as Alzheimer's and Parkinson's.

2008

Richard P. Lifton of the Yale University School of Medicine. – For the discovery of the genes that cause many forms of high and low blood pressure in humans.

2009

Bonnie Bassler of the Department of Molecular Biology at Princeton University and the Howard Hughes Medical Institute. – For pioneering investigations of quorum sensing, a mechanism that allows bacteria to "talk" to each other to coordinate their behavior, even between species.

2010

Peter Hegemann, Professor of Molecular Biophysics, Humboldt University, Berlin; Georg Nagel, Professor of Molecular Plant Physiology, Department of Botany, University of Würzburg; and Ernst Bamberg, Professor and Director of the Dept of Biophysical Chemistry, Max Planck Institute for Biophysics, Frankfurt, Germany for their discovery of channelrhodopsins, a family of light-activated ion channels. The discovery has greatly enlarged and strengthened the new field of optogenetics. Channelrhodopsins also provide a high potential for biomedical applications such as the recovery of vision and optical deep brain stimulation for treatment of Parkinson's and other diseases, instead of the more invasive electrode-based treatments.

2011

Lily Jan and Yuh Nung Jan of Howard Hughes Medical Institute at the University of California, San Francisco for their molecular identification of a founding member of a family of potassium ion channels that control nerve cell activity throughout the animal kingdom.

2012

Michael Sheetz, Columbia University; James Spudich, Stanford University, and Ronald Vale, University of California, San Francisco for explaining how cargo is moved by molecular motors along two different systems of tracks within cells.

2013

Michael Young, Rockefeller University; Jeffrey Hall, Brandeis University (Emeritus), and Michael Rosbash, Brandeis University for the discovery of the molecular mechanisms governing circadian rhythms.

2014

William Kaelin Jr.; Steven McKnight; Peter J. Ratcliffe; Gregg L. Semenza for their work in oxygen sensing systems.

2015

Evelyn M. Witkin and Stephen Elledge for their studies of the DNA damage response.

2016

Yoshinori Ohsumi for the discovery of how cells recycle their components in an orderly manner. This process, autophagy (self-eating), is critical for the maintenance and repair of cells and tissues.

2017

Joachim Frank, Richard Henderson, and Marin van Heel for pioneering developments in electron microscopy.

2018

Lynne E. Maquat for elucidating the mechanism of nonsense-mediated messenger RNA decay.

2019

Svante Pääbo and David Reich for sequencing the genomes of ancient humans and extinct relatives.

2020

No award due to the COVID-19 pandemic.

2021

Clifford Brangwynne, Anthony Hyman, and Michael Rosen for a new principle of subcellular compartmentalization based on formation of phase-separated biomolecular condensates.

2022

David Baker, Demis Hassabis, and John Jumper for pioneering studies in protein structure predictions.

2023

Michael J. Welsh, Paul Negulescu, Fredrick Van Goor, and Sabine Hadida for research and development leading to medicines that effectively treat cystic fibrosis by correcting the folding, trafficking, and functioning of the mutated cystic fibrosis transmembrane regulator (CFTR).

2024

Judith Kimble, Allan Spradling, and Raymond Schofield for their discovery of the stem cell niche, a localized environment that controls stem-cell identity.

2025

Spyros Artavanis-Tsakonas and Iva Greenwald for their work in the discovery and elucidation of the Notch signaling pathway, a crucial mechanism in cellular development and disease.

2026

John G. White, Gerald Rubin, Mala Murthy, Sebastian Seung for their pioneering work in reconstructing and interpreting connectomes—the anatomical wiring diagrams of neurons and synapses that underlie how the brain processes information and controls behavior.

== See also ==
- List of biology awards
- List of medicine awards
