= Thomas Tuschl =

German biochemist and molecular biologist

- Born: 1 June 1966 (age 60); Altdorf bei Nürnberg
- Education: Regensburg University; Max Planck Institute
- Known for: RNA interference
- Children: 3
- Awards: Wiley Prize
- Scientific career
- Workplaces: Max Planck Institute for Biophysical Chemistry; Rockefeller University

Thomas Tuschl (born 1 June 1966) is a German biochemist and molecular biologist, known for his research on RNA.

== Biography ==
Tuschl was born in Altdorf bei Nürnberg. After graduating in Chemistry from Regensburg University, Tuschl received his PhD in 1995 from the Max Planck Institute for Experimental Medicine in Göttingen. He spent four years as a post-doctoral fellow at the Whitehead Institute of the Massachusetts Institute of Technology (MIT) in Cambridge, USA.

In 1999 he returned to Göttingen, to continue his research at the Max Planck Institute for Biophysical Chemistry. There he received international recognition in Genetics for his studies of RNA interference in collaboration with the laboratory of Klaus Weber. This enables "switching off" certain genes by introducing synthetic short RNA into the cell. The mRNA is destroyed and the gene is deactivated. Possible future applications of this method include treatment of tumors or genetic disorders. The function of certain genes can be studied more easily. RNA interference is a major step in genetics.

In 2003 Tuschl became professor and head of laboratory at Rockefeller University in New York, where he continues his research. He is looking into microRNA, small RNA-sections, which are formed by the cells and cause RNA interference like introduced synthetic RNA-strains.

In 2006, two of Tuschl's fellow researchers, Andrew Z. Fire and Craig C. Mello, received the Nobel Prize in Physiology or Medicine for their discovery of "RNA interference – gene silencing by double-stranded RNA".

== Awards ==
Tuschl received several national and international awards for his work:

- 2026: Member of the National Academy of Sciences
- 2008: Ernst Jung Prize
- 2007: Max Delbrück Medal, Berlin
- 2005: Ernst Schering Prize, Berlin
- 2005: Meyenburg Prize, Heidelberg
- 2005: Dr. Albert Wander Gedenk Prize, Bern, Schweiz
- 2003: Mayor's Award for Excellence in Science and Technology, New York, USA
- 2003: Co-recipient (with Craig Mello, Andrew Fire and David Baulcombe) of the Wiley Prize in the Biomedical Sciences, The Wiley Foundation, USA
- 2003: Newcomb Cleveland Prize, American Association for the Advancement of Science, USA
- 2002: Eppendorf Young Investigator Award, Hamburg
- 2002: Otto-Klung-Weberbank-Preis for Chemistry and Physics, Berlin
