= Lin-14 =

Nuclear protein

Protein LIN-14

Identifiers
- Organism: Caenorhabditis elegans
- Symbol: lin-14
- Entrez: 181337
- Orthologs: NCBI: entry; OMA: entry
- RefSeq (mRNA): NM_077515.5
- RefSeq (Prot): NP_509916.2
- UniProt: Q21446

Other data
- Chromosome: X: 11.46 - 11.49 Mb
Search for
- Structures: Swiss-model
- Domains: InterPro

LIN-14 is a nuclear protein that plays a crucial role in regulating developmental timing in the nematode worm Caenorhabditis elegans. It functions as a heterochronic gene, controlling the timing of developmental events during larval development. LIN-14 protein levels are high at the beginning of the first larval stage (L1) and then rapidly decline, which is essential for the transition from early to late cell fates. LIN-14 is a BEN domain transcription factor, capable of binding DNA and directly regulating gene expression. The protein's activity is tightly regulated by lin-4, a microRNA which inhibits LIN-14 protein synthesis through complementary base pairing with sequences in the lin-14 mRNA 3' untranslated region.

== Regulation ==
The expression of the Lin-14 gene in Caenorhabditis elegans is tightly regulated by the Lin-4 gene through a microRNA-mediated mechanism. Lin-4 produces small RNAs that act as negative regulators of Lin-14 protein synthesis. These Lin-4 microRNAs bind to complementary sequences in the 3' untranslated region (UTR) of the Lin-14 mRNA, forming multiple RNA duplexes. This interaction leads to a post-transcriptional regulation of Lin-14 translation, resulting in a decrease over time of LIN-14 protein levels starting in the first larval stage (L1).

== Nobel Prize ==
This work on microRNA-mediated gene regulation, including the discovery of the Lin-4/Lin-14 regulatory mechanism, was recognized with the 2024 Nobel Prize in Physiology or Medicine, awarded to Victor Ambros and Gary Ruvkun "...for the discovery of microRNA and its role in post-transcriptional gene regulation." Their work on the lin-4 microRNA and its regulation of the Lin-14 protein dates back to the late 1980s and early 1990s.
