= David Baulcombe =

British plant scientist and geneticist

Sir David Baulcombe FRS FMedSci MAE
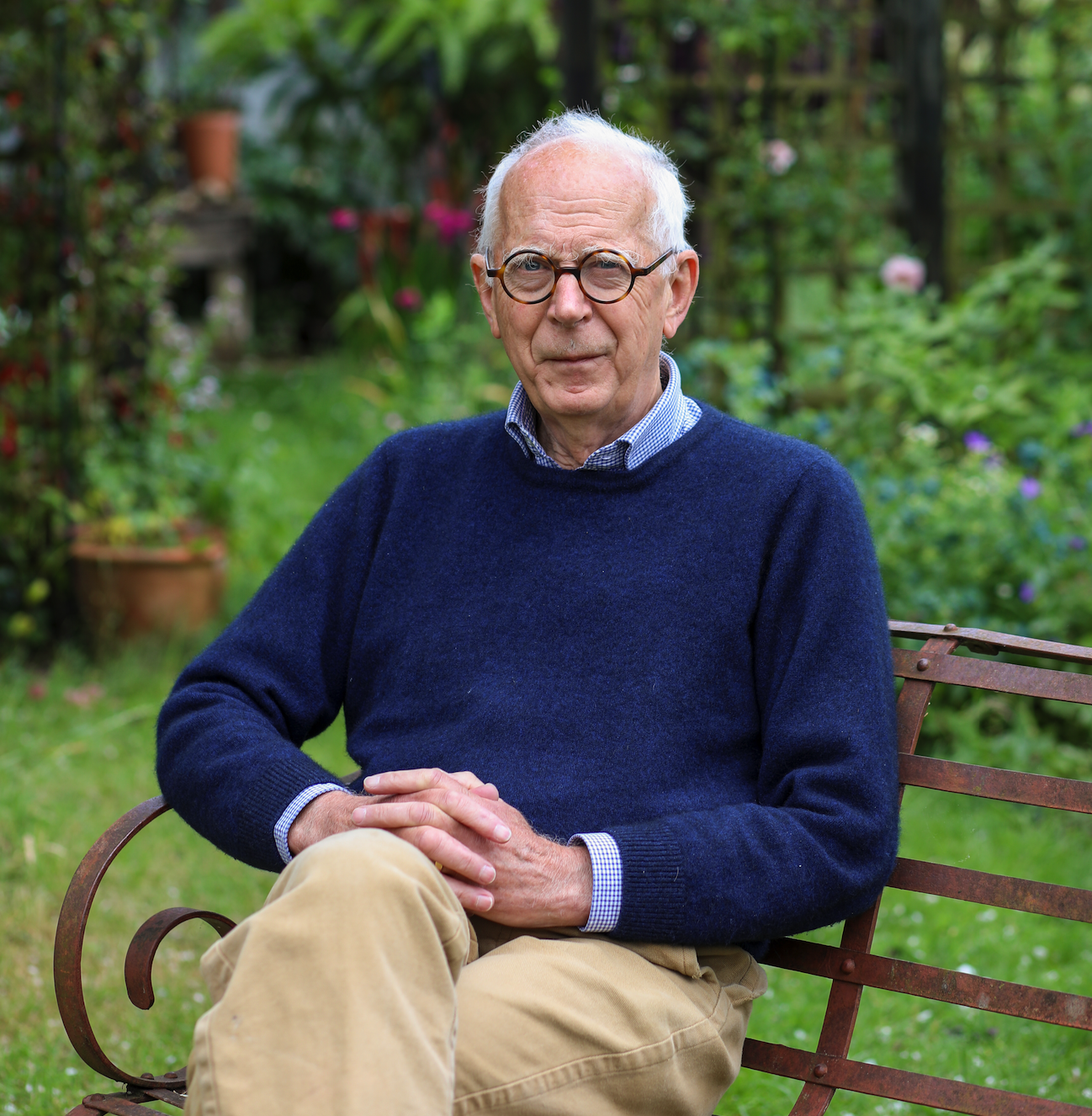
- Born: David Charles Baulcombe; 7 April 1952 (age 74); Solihull, England
- Education: University of Leeds (BSc); University of Edinburgh (PhD)
- Known for: Small interfering RNA; RNA silencing
- Spouse: Rose Eden (m. 1976)
- Children: 1 son, 3 daughters
- Awards: EMBO Member (1997); Wiley Prize (2003); Massry Prize (2005); Royal Medal (2006); Lasker Award (2008); Knight Bachelor (2009); Harvey Prize (2009); Wolf Prize in Agriculture (2010); Balzan Prize (2012); McClintock Prize (2014); Mendel Medal (2017)
- Scientific career
- Fields: Epigenetics; Disease resistance; Gene expression; Gene silencing
- Workplaces: Sainsbury Laboratory; University of East Anglia; University of Cambridge; Trinity College, Cambridge
- Thesis: The Processing and Intracellular Transport of Messenger RNA in a Higher Plant (1976)
- Doctoral advisor: John Ingle
- Doctoral students: Olivier Voinnet; Robert Martienssen
- Website: www.plantsci.cam.ac.uk/research/groups/gene-expression

Sir David Charles Baulcombe FMedSci FRS (born 7 April 1952) is a British plant scientist and geneticist. He was Regius Professor of Botany at the University of Cambridge (Emeritus since 2019) and is currently Biological Secretary and Vice President of the Royal Society. In 2026, Baulcombe was announced as the next Master of Trinity College, Cambridge.

== Early life and education ==
David Baulcombe was born on 7 April 1952 in the United Kingdom, in Solihull, Warwickshire, (in England's Midlands), into what he describes as "a non-scientific family".

As a child growing up in England's West Midlands, David Baulcombe developed a fascination for algae, mosses, and other 'lower plants', which eventually led him to study botany at Leeds before shifting his focus to molecular biology.

He received his Bachelor of Science degree in botany from the University of Leeds in 1973, and continued his studies at the University of Edinburgh, receiving his Doctor of Philosophy degree in 1977 for research on Messenger RNA in vascular plants, supervised by John Ingle.

== Career ==
After his doctoral research, Baulcombe spent the next four years as a postdoctoral fellow at McGill University from January 1977 to November 1978, and then at the University of Georgia until December 1980. He then moved to the Plant Breeding Institute in Cambridge (PBI) from 1980 until 1988 before joining the Sainsbury Laboratory in Norwich in 1988. In March 2007 he became the professor of botany at the University of Cambridge and in 2009 was elected as a Fellow of Trinity College, Cambridge. In 2009, the Cambridge professorship was renamed "Regius Professor of Botany": the first Regius Professorship created by Queen Elizabeth II.

Since 2024, David Baulcombe has been Biological Secretary and Vice President of the Royal Society. In 2026, Baulcombe was announced as the next Master of Trinity College, succeeding Sally Davies.

== Research ==
One of Baulcombe's major discoveries in 1999 with Andrew Hamilton was of small interfering RNA (siRNA) that is the specificity determinant in RNA-mediated gene silencing in plants. These small RNAs were subsequently discovered in animals and fungi as part of a process first described as RNA interference by Fire and Mello in 1996. Fire and Mello were awarded the Nobel Prize in Physiology or Medicine in 2006 for their work, although some have argued that Baulcombe was among those overlooked for that year's prize.

Following the discover of small interfering RNAs, the Baulcombe research group at the Sainsbury Laboratory helped unravel the importance of RNA silencing and small interfering RNA in epigenetics and in defence against viruses. More recently, siRNAs have been developed as drugs to treat diseases in humans.

Other interests of the Baulcombe group involve disease resistance mechanisms in plants through the actions of NB-LRR (NLR) proteins. These proteins act in pairs with one partner serving as a sensor and the other as a helper. Baulcombe and his then PHD student Jack Peart provided the first evidence for NLR proteins acting as a pair.

== Personal life ==
Baulcombe has been married to Rose Eden since 1976, and they have four children. His interests include music, sailing, and hill walking.

== Honours and awards ==
In June 2009, Baulcombe was knighted by Queen Elizabeth II in the 2009 Birthday Honours List, "for services to plant science".

Baulcombe has also received the following honours and awards:

- 1997 election to EMBO Membership;
- 2001 election as Fellow of the Royal Society (FRS);
- 2002 election as Member of the Academia Europaea (MAE);
- 2002 recipient of the Ruth Allen Award of the American Phytopathological Society;
- 2002 recipient of the Kumho Science International Award in Plant Molecular Biology and Biotechnology, awarded by the Kumho Cultural Foundation, Korea;
- 2003 co-recipient (with Thomas Tuschl, Craig Mello, an Andrew Fire), of the Wiley Prize in the Biomedical Sciences, awarded by the Wiley Foundation at Rockefeller University;
- 2004 recipient of the M. W. Beijerinck Virology Prize, awarded by the Royal Netherlands Academy of Arts and Sciences;
- 2005 election as a Foreign Associate Member of the National Academy of Sciences;
- 2005 co-recipient (with Craig Mello and Andrew Fire) of the Massry Prize, awarded by the Massry Foundation and the University of Southern California;
- 2006 recipient of the Royal Medal of The Royal Society, "For his profoundly significant recent discoveries for not only plants but for all of biology and for medicine";
- 2008 co-recipient (with Gary Ruvkun and Victor Ambros) of the Benjamin Franklin Medal, awarded by The Franklin Institute, "for their discovery of small RNAs that turn off genes";
- 2008 co-recipient (with Victor Ambros and Gary Ruvkun) of the Albert Lasker Award for Basic Medical Research;
- 2009 recipient of the Harvey Prize, granted by the Technion Israeli Institute for Technology;
- 2010 recipient of the Wolf Prize in Agriculture "for pioneering discovery of gene regulation by small inhibitory RNA molecules in plants is of profound importance, not only for agriculture, but also for biology as a whole, including the field of medicine";
- 2010 Humphry Davy Award of the Royal Society, in its last year of issue, a part of the Humphry Davy and Claude Bernard Lectures, occasional prizes and exchange lectures established by The Royal Society and Académie des Sciences, in this case, given to a senior British scientist with its lecture to be given on a visit to France;
- 2010 election as Fellow of the Academy of Medical Sciences;
- 2012 recipient of the Balzan Prize for Epigenetics;
- 2014 recipient of the Gruber Prize in Genetics;
- 2014 recipient, the inaugural recipient, of the Barbara McClintock Prize for Plant Genetics and Genome Studies, from the Maize Genetics Cooperation, for "exceptional contributions in the field of plant epigenetics";
- 2015 election as Honorary Fellow of the Royal Society of Edinburgh;
- 2020 election as an Academician in The Pontifical Academy of Sciences;
- 2023 recognition as an honorary Doctor of Science of University of Warwick.
