= Lin-4 microRNA precursor =

lin-4 microRNA precursor
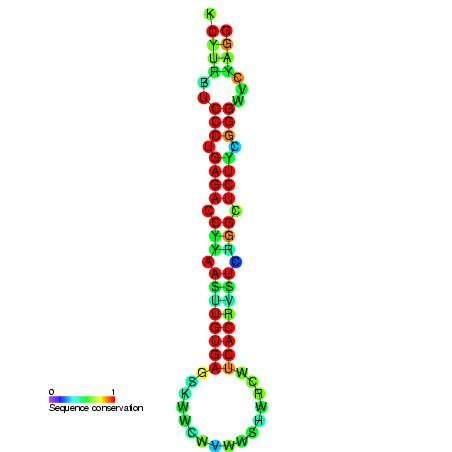
- Predicted secondary structure and sequence conservation of lin-4

Identifiers
- Symbol: lin-4
- Rfam: RF00052
- miRBase: MI0000002
- miRBase family: MIPF0000303

Other data
- RNA type: Gene; miRNA
- Domain: Eukaryota
- GO: GO:0035195 GO:0035068
- SO: SO:0001244
- PDB structures: PDBe

In molecular biology lin-4 is a microRNA (miRNA) that was identified from a study of developmental timing in the nematode Caenorhabditis elegans. It was the first to be discovered of the miRNAs, a class of non-coding RNAs involved in gene regulation. miRNAs are transcribed as ~70 nucleotide precursors and subsequently processed by the Dicer enzyme to give a 21 nucleotide product. The extents of the hairpin precursors are not generally known and are estimated based on hairpin prediction. The products are thought to have regulatory roles through complete or partial complementarity to mRNA. The lin-4 gene has been found to lie within a 4.11kb intron of a separate host gene lho-1 (see also ).

== Transcription ==
lin-4 is transcribed from autonomous miRNA promoters and is developmentally regulated, with lin-4 miRNA accumulation occurring at the L2 stage of post-embryonic development. Additional to this is the up-regulation of endogenous lin-4 primary transcripts upon appearance of the lin-4 mature form. lin-4 is found on chromosome II in C. elegans and is complementary to sequences in the 3' untranslated region (UTR) of lin-14 mRNA, this complementary transcript containing seven binding sites along with the 9 nucleotide core element CUCAGGGAA. The lin-4:lin-14 duplex is seen to take up an unusual kinked structure, caused by induced changes in the groove dimension and base stacking due to the mismatched base pairs. This lin-4:lin-14 pair have been linked to the IGF-1 pathway in C. elegans with regard to their modification of development.

== Developmental influence ==
lin-4 acts to dictate the onset of larval stages of developmental events in C. elegans. lin-4 loss of function (lf) mutations see a resultant retardation of developmental fates, from their initially early to instead later larval stages. Consequences include heterochronic developmental patterns, with loss of structures such as the vulva and adult cuticle. lin-4 acts as a negative regulator of lin-14 and represses accumulation of the LIN-14 protein. It also targets lin-28 and reduces its protein expression through translational inhibition. The base pairing in place between lin-4 and the target In question is discontinuous, consisting of two short helices.
