= Phio Pharmaceuticals =

Biotechnology company in U.S.

Phio Pharmaceuticals Inc.
- Company type: Public
- Traded as: Nasdaq: PHIO
- Industry: Biotechnology
- Founded: 2011; 15 years ago
- Headquarters: King of Prussia, Pa., United States of America
- Key people: Robert Bitterman (president and CEO)
- Website: www.phiopharma.com

Phio Pharmaceuticals Corporation is a US clinical stage biotechnology company developing its INTASYL siRNA in immuno-oncology. Formerly known as RXi Pharmaceuticals, the company's name was changed to Phio Pharmaceuticals in 2018.

== Background ==
Phio was co-founded by Nobel Laureate Craig Mello, who was awarded the Nobel prize in 2006 for his discovery of RNAi, with the intent to develop RNAi therapies. The company was originally named RXi Pharmaceuticals. RXi went public and in 2009 the company filed a patent for its unique INTASYL technology, a self-delivering RNAi platform. RXi focused on the discovery of RNAi applications for dermatological and ocular therapies. In 2017, after a number of clinical trials that demonstrated safety and clinical efficacy in these areas, the company made the decision to focus on immuno-oncology therapies, with the belief that INTASYL could provide the most value in this application. The company’s name was changed to Phio Pharmaceuticals in November 2018 to reflect its transition from a platform company to one committed to discovering immuno-oncology therapeutics based on its self-delivering RNAi platform.

Phio Pharmaceuticals stock is traded on Nasdaq as PHIO. The firm is headquartered in King of Prussia, Pa. in Montgomery County. The firm's Chairman is Robert Bitterman, previously an executive at Cutanea. In September 2022 Bitterman was appointed Executive Chair and assumed the duties of Principal Executive Officer.

== Products ==
Phio's technology platform (INTASYL) allows the development of 'self-delivering’ RNAi compounds, or 'sd-rxRNA' for short, in which drug-like properties were built into the RNAi compound itself, rather than relying on liposomal delivery to improve circulation time and cellular uptake. This platform was developed through systematic medicinal chemistry screening and they have shown the utility of their platform in three papers.

The INTASYL compounds are constructed using a single-stranded phosphorothioate region, a short duplex region, and a variety of nuclease-stabilizing and lipophilic chemical modifications. The result is spontaneous uptake in multiple cell types in vitro and in vivo.
