= Gary Ruvkun =

American geneticist (born 1952)

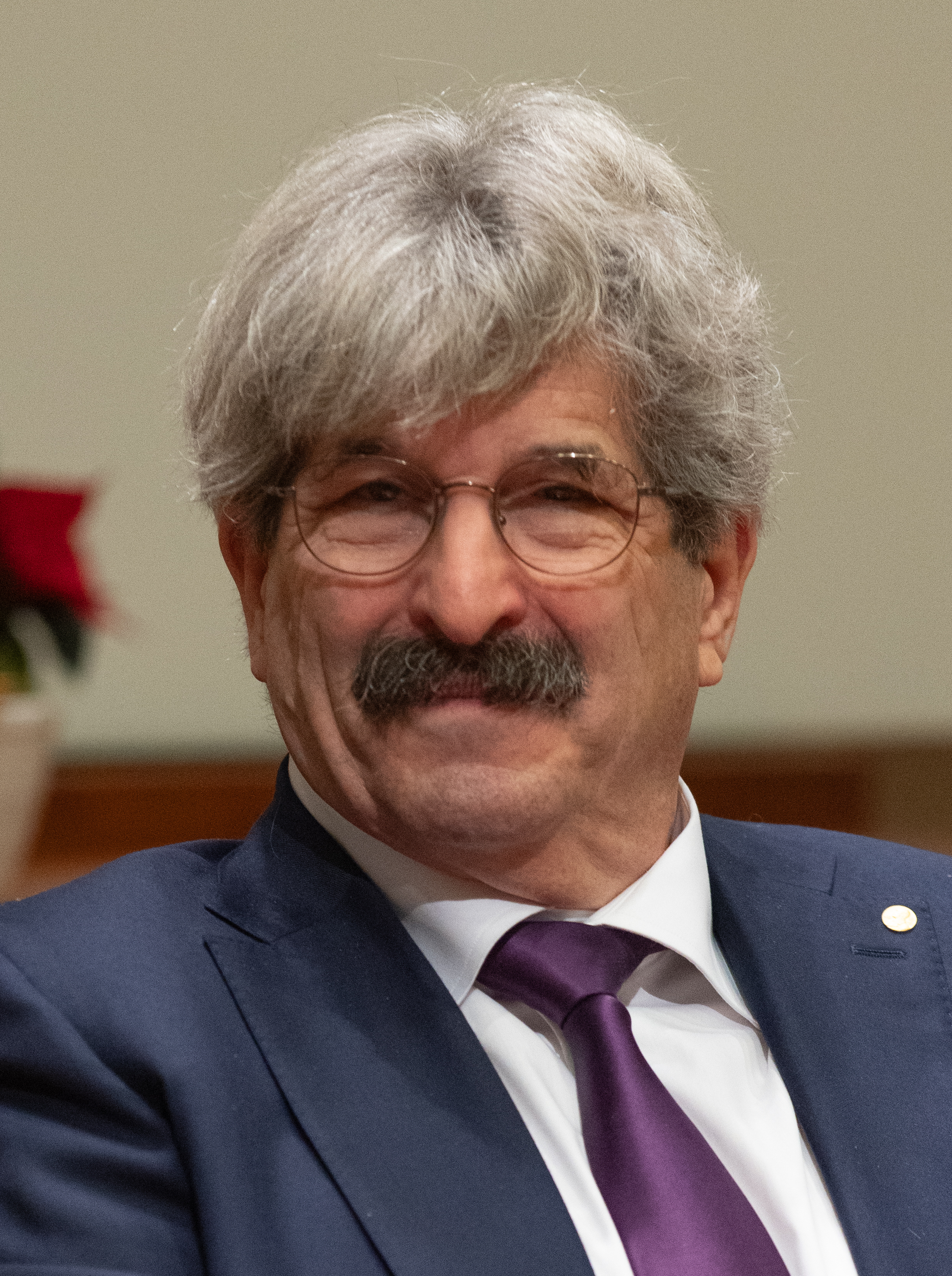
- Ruvkun in 2024
- Born: Gary Bruce Ruvkun; March 26, 1952 (age 74); Berkeley, California, U.S.
- Education: University of California, Berkeley (BA); Harvard University (PhD)
- Awards: Wolf Prize in Medicine (2014); Nobel Prize in Physiology or Medicine (2024)
- Scientific career
- Workplaces: University of California, Berkeley; Harvard University; Massachusetts Institute of Technology; Massachusetts General Hospital
- Thesis: The Molecular Genetic Analysis of Symbiotic Nitrogen Fixation (NIF) Genes from Rhizobium Meliloti (1982)
- Doctoral advisor: Frederick Ausubel
- Website: Official website

Gary Bruce Ruvkun (born March 26, 1952) is an American molecular biologist at Massachusetts General Hospital and professor of genetics at Harvard Medical School in Boston.

Ruvkun discovered the mechanism by which lin-4, the first microRNA (miRNA) discovered by Victor Ambros, regulates the translation of target messenger RNAs via imperfect base-pairing to those targets, and discovered the second miRNA, let-7, and that it is conserved across animal phylogeny, including in humans. These miRNA discoveries revealed a new world of RNA regulation at an unprecedented small size scale, and the mechanism of that regulation. Ruvkun also discovered many features of insulin-like signaling in the regulation of aging and metabolism.

He was elected a Member of the American Philosophical Society in 2019. Ruvkun was awarded the 2024 Nobel Prize in Physiology or Medicine for the discovery of microRNA and its role in post-transcriptional gene regulation.

== Early life and education ==
Ruvkun was born into a Jewish family, the son of Samuel and Dora (née Gurevich) Ruvkun, in Berkeley, California.

Ruvkun received a Bachelor of Arts (BA) with a major in biophysics from the University of California, Berkeley in 1973. He received a Doctor of Philosophy (PhD) in biophysics from Harvard University in 1982. He conducted his doctoral studies in the laboratory of Frederick M. Ausubel, where he investigated bacterial nitrogen fixation genes. Ruvkun completed postdoctoral research with Robert Horvitz at the Massachusetts Institute of Technology (MIT) and Walter Gilbert of Harvard.

== Research ==
=== miRNA lin-4 ===
Ruvkun's research revealed that the miRNA lin-4, a 22 nucleotide regulatory RNA discovered in 1992 by Victor Ambros' lab, regulates its target mRNA lin-14 by forming imperfect RNA duplexes to down-regulate translation. The first indication that the key regulatory element of the lin-14 gene recognized by the lin-4 gene product was in the lin-14 3’ untranslated region came from the analysis of lin-14 gain-of-function mutations which showed that they are deletions of conserved elements in the lin-14 3’ untranslated region. Deletion of these elements relieves the normal late stage-specific repression of LIN-14 protein production, and lin-4 is necessary for that repression by the normal lin-14 3' untranslated region. In a key breakthrough, the Ambros lab discovered that lin-4 encodes a very small RNA product, defining the 22 nucleotide miRNAs. When Ambros and Ruvkun compared the sequence of the lin-4 miRNA and the lin-14 3’ untranslated region, they discovered that the lin-4 RNA base pairs with conserved bulges and loops to the 3’ untranslated region of the lin-14 target mRNA, and that the lin-14 gain of function mutations delete these lin-14 complementary sites to relieve the normal repression of translation by lin-4. In addition, they showed that the lin-14 3' untranslated region could confer this lin-4-dependent translational repression on unrelated mRNAs by creating chimeric mRNAs that were lin-4-responsive. In 1993, Ruvkun reported in the journal Cell on the regulation of lin-14 by lin-4. In the same issue of Cell, Victor Ambros described the regulatory product of lin-4 as a small RNA. These papers revealed a new world of RNA regulation at an unprecedented small size scale, and the mechanism of that regulation. Together, this research is now recognized as the first description of microRNAs and the mechanism by which partially base-paired miRNA::mRNA duplexes inhibit translation.

=== microRNA, let-7 ===
In 2000, the Ruvkun lab reported the identification of second C. elegans microRNA, let-7, which like the first microRNA regulates translation of the target gene, in this case lin-41, via imperfect base pairing to the 3’ untranslated region of that mRNA. This was an indication that miRNA regulation via 3’ UTR complementarity may be a common feature, and that there were likely to be more microRNAs. The generality of microRNA regulation to other animals was established by the Ruvkun lab later in 2000, when they reported that the sequence and regulation of the let-7 microRNA is conserved across animal phylogeny, including in humans.

=== miRNAs and siRNAs ===
When siRNAs of the same 21-22 nucleotide size as lin-4 and let-7 were discovered in 1999 by Hamilton and Baulcombe in plants, the fields of RNAi and miRNAs suddenly converged. It seemed likely that the similarly sized miRNAs and siRNAs would use similar mechanisms. In a collaborative effort, the Mello and Ruvkun labs showed that the first known components of RNA interference and their paralogs, Dicer and the PIWI proteins, are used by both miRNAs and siRNAs. Ruvkun's lab in 2003 identified many more miRNAs, identified miRNAs from mammalian neurons, and in 2007 discovered many new protein-cofactors for miRNA function.

=== C. elegans metabolism and longevity ===
Ruvkun's laboratory has also discovered that an insulin-like signaling pathway controls C. elegans metabolism and longevity. Klass Johnson and Kenyon showed that the developmental arrest program mediated by mutations in age-1 and daf-2 increase C. elegans longevity. The Ruvkun lab established that these genes constitute an insulin like receptor and a downstream phosphatidylinositol kinase that couple to the daf-16 gene product, a highly conserved Forkhead transcription factor. Homologues of these genes have now been implicated in regulation of human aging. These findings are also important for diabetes, since the mammalian orthologs of daf-16 (referred to as FOXO transcription factors) are also regulated by insulin. The Ruvkun lab has used full genome RNAi libraries to discover genes that regulate aging and metabolism. Many of these genes are broadly conserved in animal phylogeny and could be targeted in diabetes drug development.

=== SETG: The Search for Extraterrestrial Genomes ===
The Ruvkun lab in collaboration with Maria Zuber at MIT, Chris Carr (now at Georgia Tech), and Michael Finney (now a San Francisco biotech entrepreneur) has been developing protocols and instruments that can amplify and sequence DNA and RNA to search for life on another planet that is ancestrally related to the Tree of Life on Earth. The Search for Extraterrestrial Genomes, or SETG, project has been developing a small instrument that can determine DNA sequences on Mars (or any other planetary body), and send the information in those DNA sequence files to Earth for comparison to life on Earth.

=== Innate immune surveillance ===
In 2012, Ruvkun made an original contribution to the field of immunology with the publication of a featured paper in the journal Cell describing an elegant mechanism for innate immune surveillance in animals that relies on the monitoring of core cellular functions in the host, which are often sabotaged by microbial toxins during the course of infection.

== Microbial life beyond the Solar System ==
In 2019, Ruvkun, together with Chris Carr, Mike Finney and Maria Zuber, presented the argument that the appearance of sophisticated microbial life on Earth soon after it cooled, and the recent discoveries of hot Jupiters and disruptive planetary migrations in exoplanet systems favors the spread of DNA-based microbial life across the galaxy. The SETG project is working to have NASA send a DNA sequencer to Mars to search for life there in the hope that evidence will be uncovered that life did not arise originally on Earth, but elsewhere in the universe.

== Published articles and recognition ==
As of 2018, Ruvkun has published about 150 scientific articles. Ruvkun has received numerous awards for his contributions to medical science, for his contributions to the aging field and to the discovery of microRNAs. He is a recipient of the Lasker Award for Basic Medical Research, the Gairdner Foundation International Award, and the Benjamin Franklin Medal in Life Science. Ruvkun was elected as a member of the National Academy of Sciences in 2008.

== Awards ==
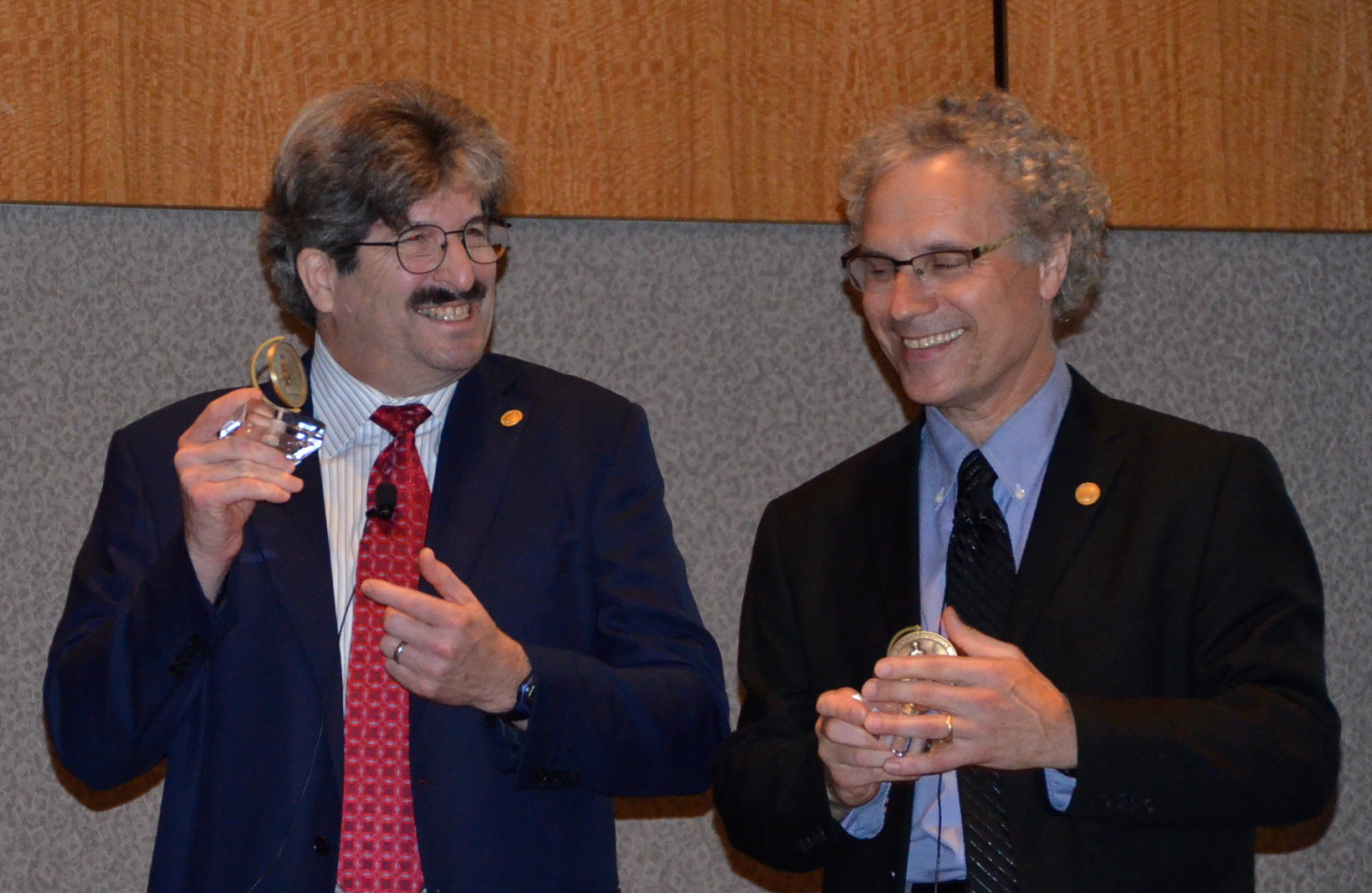
Ruvkun received Gruber Prize in Genetics alongside Victor Ambros in 2014.

- 2004 Rosenstiel Award for Distinguished Work in Medical Research of Brandeis University (co-recipient with Craig Mello, Andrew Fire and Victor Ambros)
- 2008 Warren Triennial Prize, Massachusetts General Hospital (co-recipient with Victor Ambros)
- 2008 Gairdner Foundation International Award (co-recipient with Victor Ambros)
- 2008 Benjamin Franklin Medal in Life Science (co-recipient with Victor Ambros and David Baulcombe)
- 2008 Lasker Foundation Award for Basic Medical Research (co-recipient with Victor Ambros and David Baulcombe)
- 2008 Elected to the National Academy of Sciences
- 2009 Louisa Gross Horwitz Prize, Columbia University (co-recipient with Victor Ambros)
- 2009 American Academy of Arts and Sciences
- 2009 Massry Prize from the Keck School of Medicine, University of Southern California (co-recipient with Victor Ambros)
- 2009 Institute of Medicine
- 2011 The International Dan David Prize, awarded by Tel Aviv University, Israel (co-recipient with Cynthia Kenyon)
- 2012 Dr. Paul Janssen Award for Biomedical Research with Victor Ambros
- 2014 Wolf Prize for Medicine (co-recipient with Victor Ambros)
- 2015 Breakthrough Prize in Life Sciences (co-recipient with C. David Allis, Victor Ambros, Alim Louis Benabid, Jennifer A. Doudna and Emmanuelle Charpentier).
- 2016 March of Dimes Prize in Developmental Biology (co-recipient with Victor Ambros)
- 2023 Highly Ranked Scholar by ScholarGPS
- 2024 Nobel Prize in Physiology or Medicine (co-recipient with Victor Ambros)

== See also ==
- List of Jewish Nobel laureates
