= Andrew Fire =

American biologist and professor of pathology and genetics

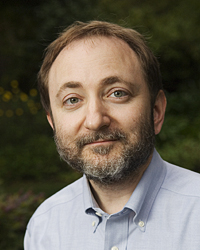
- Fire in 2008
- Born: Andrew Zachary Fire; April 27, 1959 (age 67); Palo Alto, California, U.S.
- Education: University of California, Berkeley; Massachusetts Institute of Technology
- Known for: RNA interference
- Awards: Meyenburg Prize (2002); NAS Award in Molecular Biology (2003); Wiley Prize (2003); Massry Prize (2005); Nobel Prize in Physiology or Medicine (2006)
- Scientific career
- Fields: Pathology, genetics
- Workplaces: Johns Hopkins University; Stanford University; MRC Laboratory of Molecular Biology
- Thesis: In vitro transcription studies of adenovirus (1983)
- Doctoral advisor: Phillip Allen Sharp
- Notable students: Jenny Hsieh

Andrew Zachary Fire (born April 27, 1959) is an American biologist and professor of pathology and of genetics at the Stanford University School of Medicine. He was awarded the 2006 Nobel Prize in Physiology or Medicine, along with Craig C. Mello, for the discovery of RNA interference (RNAi). This research was conducted at the Carnegie Institution of Washington and published in 1998.

== Biography ==
Andrew Z Fire was born in Palo Alto, California and raised in Sunnyvale, California in a Jewish family. He graduated from Fremont High School. He attended the University of California, Berkeley for his undergraduate degree, where he received a B.A. in mathematics in 1978 at the age of 19. He then proceeded to the Massachusetts Institute of Technology, where he received a Ph.D. in biology in 1983 under the mentorship of Nobel laureate geneticist Phillip Sharp.

Fire moved to Cambridge, England, as a Helen Hay Whitney Postdoctoral Fellow. He became a member of the MRC Laboratory of Molecular Biology group headed by Nobel laureate biologist Sydney Brenner.

From 1986 to 2003, Fire was a staff member of the Carnegie Institution of Washington’s Department of Embryology in Baltimore, Maryland. The initial work on double stranded RNA as a trigger of gene silencing was published while Fire and his group were at the Carnegie Labs. Fire became an adjunct professor in the Department of Biology at Johns Hopkins University in 1989 and joined the Stanford faculty in 2003. Throughout his career, Fire has been supported by research grants from the U.S. National Institutes of Health.

Fire is a member of the National Academy of Sciences and the American Academy of Arts and Sciences. He also serves on the Board of Scientific Counselors and the National Center for Biotechnology, National Institutes of Health.

== Nobel Prize ==
In 2006, Fire and Craig Mello shared the Nobel Prize in Physiology or Medicine for work first published in 1998 in the journal Nature. Fire and Mello, along with colleagues SiQun Xu, Mary Montgomery, Stephen Kostas, and Sam Driver, reported that tiny snippets of double-stranded RNA (dsRNA) effectively shut down specific genes, driving the destruction of messenger RNA (mRNA) with sequences matching the dsRNA. As a result, the mRNA cannot be translated into protein. Fire and Mello found that dsRNA was much more effective in gene silencing than the previously described method of RNA interference with single-stranded RNA. Because only small numbers of dsRNA molecules were required for the observed effect, Fire and Mello proposed that a catalytic process was involved. This hypothesis was confirmed by subsequent research.

The Nobel Prize citation, issued by Sweden's Karolinska Institute, said: "This year's Nobel Laureates have discovered a fundamental mechanism for controlling the flow of genetic information." The British Broadcasting Corporation (BBC) quoted Nick Hastie, director of the Medical Research Council's Human Genetics Unit, on the scope and implications of the research:

It is very unusual for a piece of work to completely revolutionise the whole way we think about biological processes and regulation, but this has opened up a whole new field in biology.

== Awards and honors ==
Fire has received the following awards and honors:
(By chronological year of award)

- Meyenburg Prize in 2002
- Co-recipient (with Craig Mello) of National Academy of Sciences Award in Molecular Biology in 2003
- Co-recipient (with Craig Mello, Thomas Tuschl and David Baulcombe) of the Wiley Prize in the Biomedical Sciences from Rockefeller University in 2003
- Elected member National Academy of Sciences in 2004
- Co-recipient (with Victor Ambros, Craig Mello, and Gary Ruvkun) of Brandeis University's Lewis S. Rosenstiel Award for Distinguished Work in Medical Research in 2005
- Co-recipient (with Craig Mello) of the Gairdner Foundation International Award in 2005
- Co-recipient (with Craig Mello and David Baulcombe) of the Massry Prize in 2005
- Co-recipient (with Craig Mello) of the Paul Ehrlich and Ludwig Darmstaedter Prize in 2006
- Co-recipient (with Craig Mello) of the Nobel Prize in Physiology or Medicine in 2006

== See also ==
- History of RNA biology
- List of Jewish Nobel laureates
- List of RNA biologists
