= Craig Mello =

American biologist (born 1960)

Craig Cameron Mello
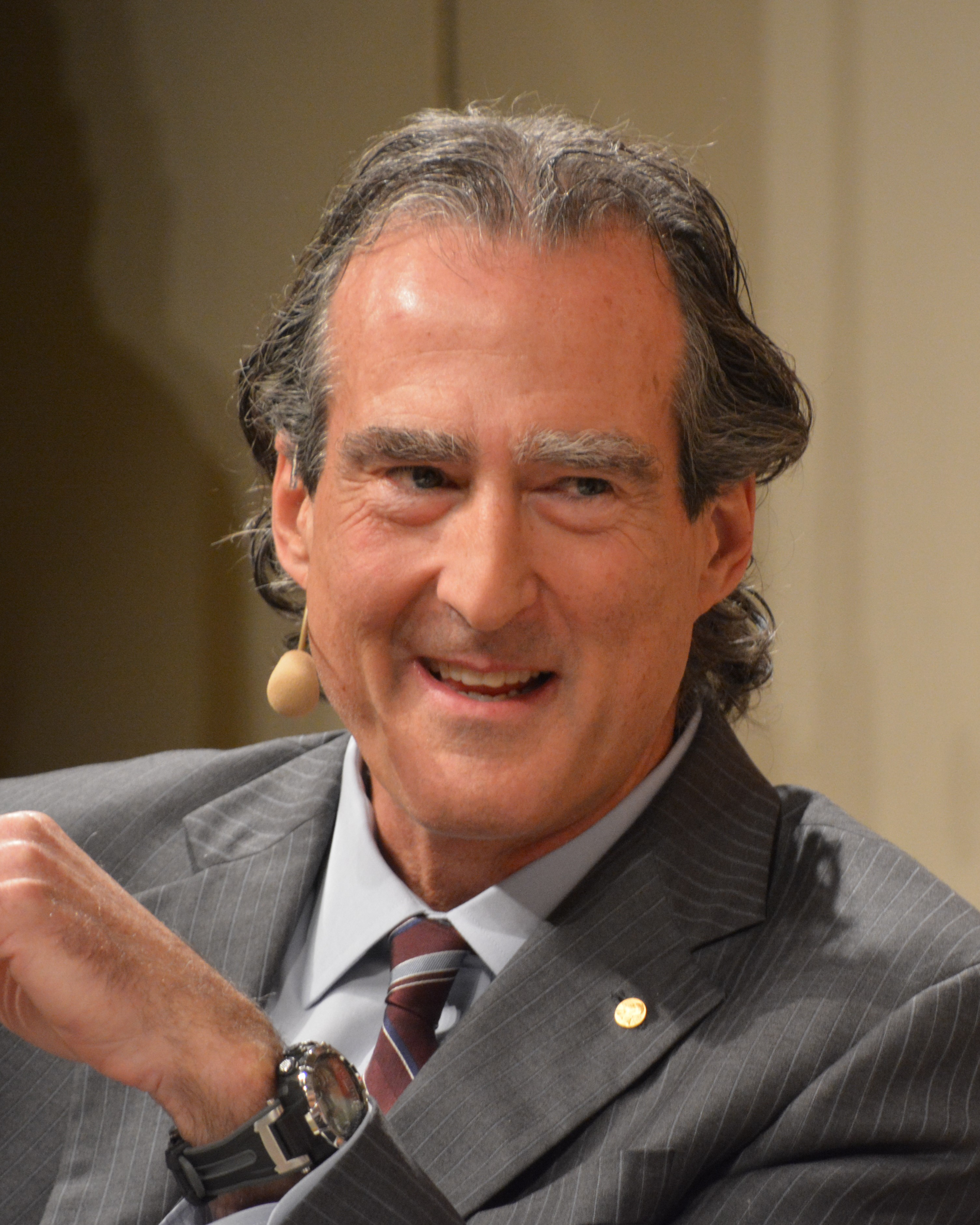
- Mello in 2014
- Born: October 18, 1960 (age 66); New Haven, Connecticut, U.S.
- Education: Brown University (BS); Harvard University (PhD)
- Known for: RNA interference
- Awards: Wiley Prize (2003); NAS Award in Molecular Biology (2003); Massry Prize (2005); Gairdner Foundation International Award (2005); Nobel Prize in Physiology or Medicine (2006)
- Scientific career
- Fields: Biologist
- Workplaces: University of Massachusetts Medical School
- Academic advisors: Nelson Fausto; Susan Gerbi; Ken Miller; Frank Rothman; Victor Ambros; Daniel Stinchcomb

Craig Cameron Mello (born October 18, 1960) is an American biologist and professor in the RNA Therapeutics Institute and Program for Molecular Medicine at the University of Massachusetts Chan Medical School in Worcester, Massachusetts. He was awarded the 2006 Nobel Prize for Physiology or Medicine, along with Andrew Z. Fire, for the discovery of RNA interference. This research was conducted at the Carnegie Institution of Washington and published in 1998. Mello has been a Howard Hughes Medical Institute investigator since 2000.

== Early life ==
Mello was born in New Haven, Connecticut on October 18, 1960. He was the third child of James and Sally Mello. His father, James Mello, was a paleontologist and his mother, Sally Mello, was an artist. His paternal grandparents immigrated to the US from the Portuguese islands of Azores. His parents met while attending Brown University and were the first children in their respective families to attend college. His grandparents on both sides withdrew from school as teenagers to work for their families. James Mello completed his Ph.D. in paleontology from Yale University in 1962. The Mello family moved to Falls Church in northern Virginia so that James could take a position with the United States Geological Survey (USGS) in Washington, DC. He was raised as Roman Catholic.

After a brief stay in Falls Church, the family moved to Fairfax, Virginia, when James Mello switched from the USGS to a position as assistant director at the Smithsonian Museum of Natural History. Among Craig's fondest early memories were field trips with his father and the whole family to Colorado and Wyoming and more frequent trips to the Blue Ridge mountains in Virginia.

The Mello family had a very strong tradition of discussions around the dinner table and this experience was very important to young Mello. He learned to argue, to listen, and to admit it when he was wrong about something. At a time when young Mello was not performing so well in school, these daily discussions helped to build his confidence and self-esteem. Mello struggled during the first few years of grade school. He started first grade at the age of five in a local private school because he was too young to enter first grade in the public system. He doesn't know if he was a slow learner, or just not interested, but he did not do well in school until the seventh grade. In second grade, Mello only pretended that he could read and he was embarrassed by being called on in class. He much preferred playing outdoors, in the woods and creeks, to time spent in the classroom. Meanwhile, his older siblings were model students, raising the teacher's expectations for him. During these early years, Mello had no doubt that he would be a scientist when he grew up. He is now the father of two daughters and a step-daughter and step-son.

== Education ==
Mello attended Fairfax High School (Fairfax, Virginia). After receiving his high school diploma, Mello attended Brown University as a biochemistry and molecular biology major. Kenneth Miller, his cell biology instructor, recounted that although he did not receive the "best grades of the class," he was intensely curious and thus a "real pain in the ass." Mello would never let Miller finish a lecture without asking him for more references, questions, or evidence for concepts discussed in the lecture. He received his Bachelor of Science from Brown in 1982.

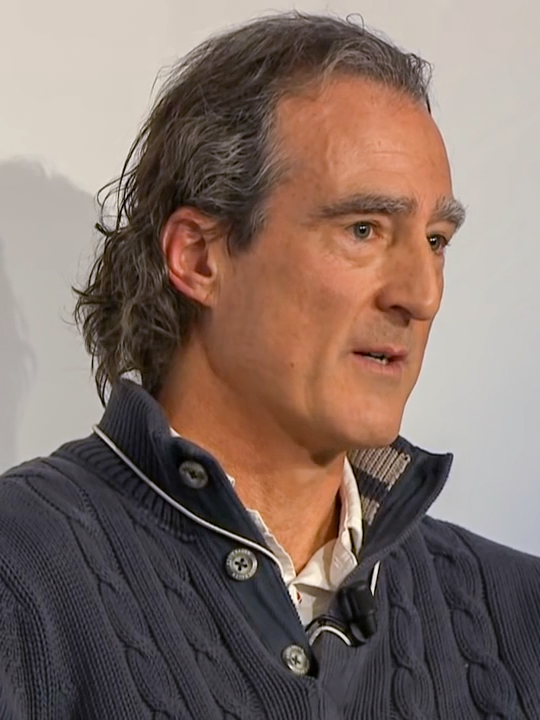
Mello at the 2015 World Economic Forum

Mello attended the University of Colorado, Boulder for graduate studies in molecular, cellular and developmental biology with David Hirsh. After Hirsh decided to take a position in industry, Mello moved to Harvard University where he could continue his research with Dan Stinchcomb. Mello completed his Ph.D. at Harvard in 1990. He was a postdoctoral fellow at the Fred Hutchinson Cancer Research Center in the laboratory of James Priess.

== Nobel prize ==
In 2006, Mello and Fire received the Nobel Prize for work that began in 1998, when Mello and Fire along with their colleagues (SiQun Xu, Mary Montgomery, Stephen Kostas, and Sam Driver) published a paper in the journal Nature detailing how tiny snippets of RNA fool the cell into destroying the gene's messenger RNA (mRNA) before it can produce a protein - effectively shutting specific genes down.

In the annual Howard Hughes Medical Institute Scientific Meeting held on November 13, 2006 in Ashburn, Virginia, Mello recounted the phone call that he received announcing that he had won the prize. He recalls that it was shortly after 4:30 am and he had just finished checking on his daughter, and returned to his bedroom. The phone rang (or rather the green light was blinking) and his wife told him not to answer, as it was a prank call. Upon questioning his wife, she revealed that it had rung while he was out of the room and someone was playing a bad joke on them by saying that he had won the Nobel prize. When he told her that they were actually announcing the Nobel prize winners on this very day, he said "her jaw dropped." He answered the phone, and the voice on the other end told him to get dressed, and that in half an hour his life was about to change.

The Nobel citation, issued by Sweden's Karolinska Institute, said: "This year's Nobel Laureates have discovered a fundamental mechanism for controlling the flow of genetic information."

Mello and Fire's research, conducted at the Carnegie Institution for Science (Fire) and the University of Massachusetts Medical School (Mello), had shown that in fact RNA plays a key role in gene regulation. According to Professor Nick Hastie, director of the Medical Research Council's Human Genetics Unit, said: "It is very unusual for a piece of work to completely revolutionize the whole way we think about biological processes and regulation, but this has opened up a whole new field in biology."

== Philosophical outlook ==
Mello admired and worked with Stephen J. Gould and has been inspired by his essays on natural history and the philosophy of science.

He believes that "The science vs. religion debate is over" and that it is possible to "unite rationality and spirituality in a worldview that celebrates the mysteries of existence and inspires each human being to achieve a higher purpose in life"

In his October 2015 acceptance speech for a China Friendship Award from Premier Li Keqiang Mello said,

Science is a unifier. Science values questions rather than beliefs. Science provides a path for humans to learn about their world, it helps us to create new knowledge and advance our cultures. There are so many forces that divide people; barriers of language, custom, ideology, and belief. Science counteracts these forces, it is a worldwide enterprise that unifies us and brings us together to solve problems and to understand our place in the world. Indeed, science tells us that we share a deep common history as a species, and that we will very likely share a common destiny as inhabitants of a small and fragile planet.

— Craig Mello 2006 China Friendship Award

== Involvement in RNAi biotechnology industry ==
Mello is involved in several RNAi-based biotechnology companies. He is a co-founder of RXi Pharmaceuticals where he Chairs the Scientific Advisory Board. In June 2010, he joined the Technology Advisory Board of Beeologics, a company focused on development of RNAi products for honeybee health and various veterinary and agricultural applications, which, according to Mello, "could very well be the first company to obtain FDA approval for an RNAi therapy". In September 2011, Monsanto acquired Beeologics.

== Awards and honors ==
(By chronological year of award)

- Co-recipient (with Andrew Fire) of National Academy of Sciences Award in Molecular Biology in 2003.
- Co-recipient (with Andrew Fire, Thomas Tuschl and David Baulcombe) of the Wiley Prize in the Biomedical Sciences from Rockefeller University in 2003.
- Elected member National Academy of Sciences in 2005.
- Co-recipient (with Victor Ambros, Andrew Fire and Gary Ruvkun) of Brandeis University's Lewis S. Rosenstiel Award for Distinguished Work in Medical Research in 2005.
- Co-recipient (with Andrew Fire) of the Gairdner Foundation International Award in 2005.
- Co-recipient (with Andrew Fire and David Baulcombe) of Massry Prize in 2005.
- Co-recipient (with Andrew Fire) of the Paul Ehrlich and Ludwig Darmstaedter Prize in 2006.
- Inaugural recipient of The Dr. Paul Janssen Award for Biomedical Research by Johnson & Johnson in 2006.
- Co-recipient (with Andrew Fire) of the Nobel Prize in Physiology or Medicine in 2006.
- Recipient of an honorary doctorate by Brown University in 2007. He gave the keynote Baccalaureate Address at Commencement ceremonies.
- Recipient of the Golden Plate Award of the American Academy of Achievement in 2007.
- Recipient of an honorary doctorate by Simmons College in 2008.
- Recipient of the Hope Funds Award of Excellence in Basic Research in 2008.
- Elected member American Academy of Arts & Sciences in 2008.
