= Suzanne Eaton =

American molecular biologist (1959–2019)

- Born: December 23, 1959; Oakland, California, U.S.
- Died: July 2, 2019 (aged 59); Chania, Crete, Greece
- Education: Brown University (B.S.); University of California, Los Angeles (Ph.D.)
- Spouse: Anthony A. Hyman
- Children: 2
- Awards: WICB Junior Award (2006)
- Scientific career
- Workplaces: European Molecular Biology Laboratory; Max Planck Institute of Molecular Cell Biology and Genetics; TU Dresden
- Thesis: Molecular analysis of an immunoglobulin heavy chain promoter (1988)
- Doctoral advisor: Kathryn Calame

Suzanne Eaton (December 23, 1959 – July 2, 2019) was an American scientist and professor of molecular biology at the Max Planck Institute of Molecular Cell Biology and Genetics in Dresden, Germany.

== Early life and education ==
Eaton was born on December 23, 1959, in Oakland, California. One of Eaton's self-confessed role models as a child was Spock, due to his rational approach to problem solving. She was also a talented pianist, having played since the age of eight.

As an undergraduate, Eaton was torn between a career as a biologist, a comparative literature professor, or a mathematician. The deciding factor was a course that was taught from primary literature instead of a textbook, sparking an enthusiasm for biological research.

Eaton completed a B.S. in biology at Brown University in 1981 before earning a Ph.D. in microbiology at University of California, Los Angeles in 1988. Her thesis, entitled Molecular analysis of an immunoglobulin heavy chain promoter, was completed under the supervision of Kathryn Calame. She was awarded the Sydney C. Rittenberg Award for Distinguished Academic Achievement in Microbiology by the Association of Academic Women in 1988 for her doctoral work.

== Career and research ==
Eaton began her research career working on immunoglobulin heavy chain genes at University of California, Los Angeles, in the laboratory of Kathryn Calame. In 1988, Eaton switched fields to developmental biology, investigating how cells obtain their tissue identities in the fruit fly, Drosophila melanogaster, while in the group of Thomas B. Kornberg at University of California, San Francisco.

Eaton moved to Germany in 1993 to work at the European Molecular Biology Laboratory in Heidelberg in the group of Kai Simons, where she combined her expertise in microbiology and developmental biology to investigate how the cytoskeleton helps cells attain their polarity in tissues, using the fruit fly as a model system. In 2000, Eaton became one of the founding members of the Max Planck Institute of Molecular Cell Biology and Genetics in Dresden, Germany, where her group investigated how signaling molecules and mechanical properties of cells act together to shape tissues in the fruit fly. In 2015, she became a professor of developmental cell biology of invertebrates at the TU Dresden.

== Awards and honors ==
- 1977: New York State Regents Scholar
- 1988: Sydney C. Rittenberg Award for Distinguished Academic Achievement in Microbiology, Association of Academic Women
- 2006: Women in Cell Biology Junior Award for Excellence in Research, American Society for Cell Biology

== Personal life ==
Eaton was married to the British scientist Anthony A. Hyman. The couple had two sons. She was an athlete and runner, and had a black belt in Taekwondo.

After her death, her sister wrote: "She took great pleasure in preparing exquisite meals and had an exotic fashion sense. She loved perfume. She taught and practiced Tae Kwon Do as a second-degree black belt. She finished crossword puzzles way too quickly, played concertos, and read extensively. She fit Jane Austen’s strictest description of an 'accomplished woman' while maintaining a natural humility and 'insatiable curiosity'".

== Disappearance and death ==
Eaton disappeared on July 2, 2019. She was last seen playing the piano in the hotel lobby where she was attending a conference at the Orthodox Academy in Chania, Crete. It is believed that her disappearance occurred during a run. Greek police found her body on July 8 inside a World War II bunker. A homicide investigation was opened after it was determined that she died by asphyxiation.

Giannis Paraskakis (also spelled Yiannis or Ioannis, Greek: Ιωάννης Παρασκάκης), a 27-year-old Greek man and married father of two, admitted during police questioning to striking her twice with his car, knocking her unconscious, and loading her into his trunk. He then drove to the remote bunker, where he raped her and left her to die. In October 2020, Paraskakis was convicted of Eaton's murder and given a life sentence.

== Memorial fund ==
In honor of Eaton's interdisciplinary legacy to the scientific community, the Institute of Molecular Biotechnology in Austria instated a memorial fund with the stated aim of supporting young scientists' endeavors in interdisciplinary topics. In March 2021, the European Molecular Biology Organization (EMBO) launched a New Venture Fellowship in memory of Suzanne Eaton meant to "[support] young researchers from across the life sciences to enter a new field or bring a new direction to their work."

== See also ==
- List of kidnappings
- Lists of solved missing person cases

== Selected publications ==
- Eaton, Suzanne (July 1995). "Apical, basal, and lateral cues for epithelial polarization." Cell. 82: 5.
- Eaton, Suzanne (December 1996). "Roles for Rac1 and Cdc42 in planar polarization and hair outgrowth in the wing of Drosophila." Journal of Cell Biology. 135: 1277.
- Eaton, Suzanne (May 2005). "Lipoprotein particles are required for Hedgehog and Wingless signalling." Nature. 435: 58.
- Eaton, Suzanne (September 2010). "Cell Flow Reorients the Axis of Planar Polarity in the Wing Epithelium of Drosophila." Cell. 142: 773.
