= Petra Schwille =

German biophysicist

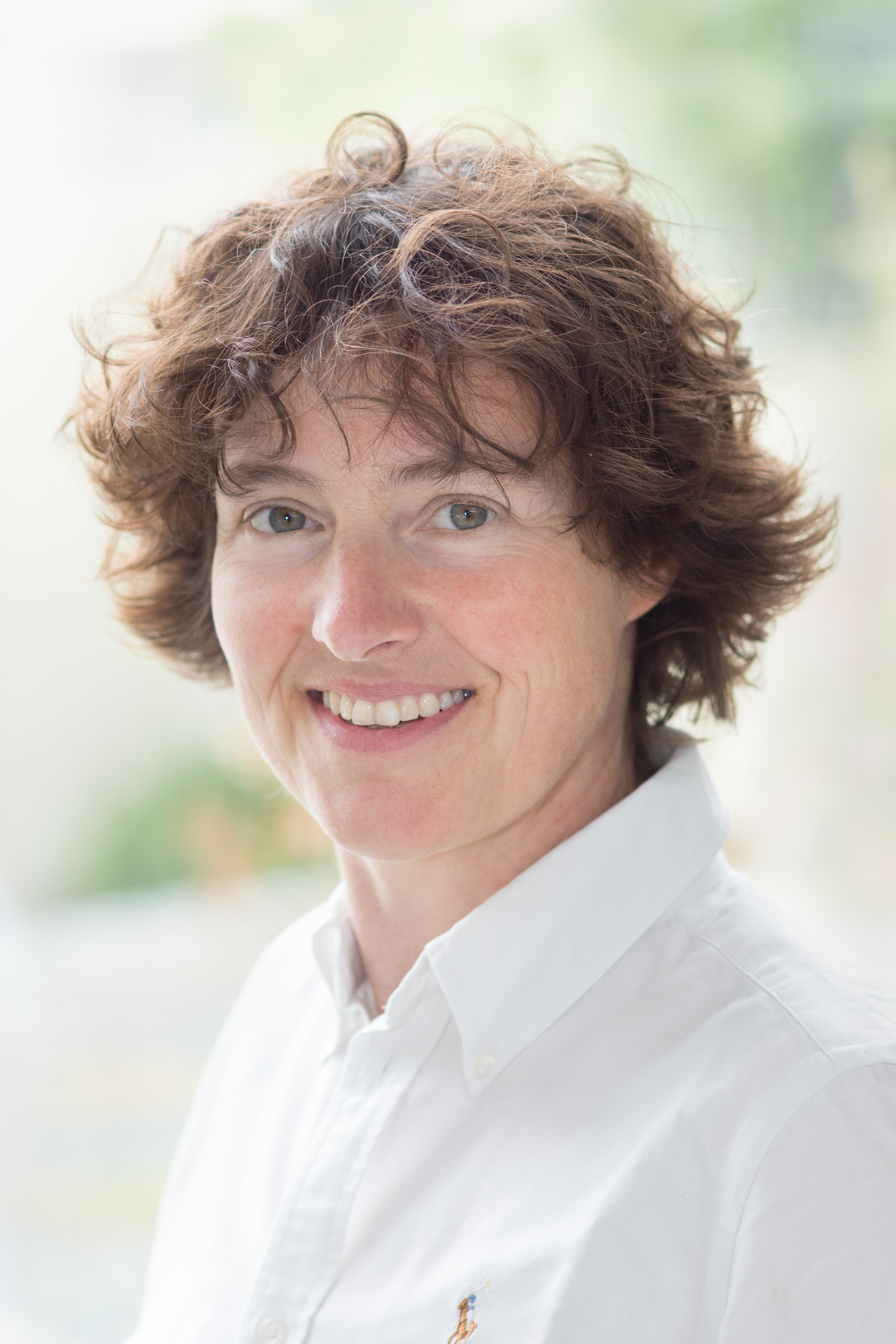
- Education: Doctor of Philosophy
- Alma mater: University of Stuttgart; University of Göttingen; Max Planck Institute for Biophysical Chemistry; Cornell University
- Awards: Leibniz Prize (2010); Philip Morris Research Prize (2004); Bavarian Maximilian Order for Science and Art (2018); EMBO Membership (2013); Suffrage Science award (2013); Otto Warburg Medal (2021)
- Academic career
- Institutions: TU Dresden (2002–2012); Max Planck Institute of Biochemistry (2011–); LMU Munich (2012–); Max Planck Institute for Biophysical Chemistry (1999–2002)
- Doctoral advisor: Manfred Eigen

Petra Schwille (born 25 January 1968 in Sindelfingen) is a German professor and a researcher in the area of biophysics. Since 2011, she has been a director of the Department of Cellular and Molecular Biophysics at the Max Planck Institute for Biochemistry in Martinsried, Germany. She is known for her ground-laying work in the field of fluorescence cross-correlation spectroscopy, and numerous contributions on model membranes. Her current research focuses around bottom-up approaches to building an artificial cell within a broader area of synthetic biology. In 2010, Schwille received the Gottfried Wilhelm Leibniz Prize.

== Education ==
Schwille graduated with a Diploma in physics from the University of Göttingen in 1993. She worked toward her doctoral degree in physics at the Max Planck Institute for Biophysical Chemistry in Göttingen, Germany, and received her degree from Technical University of Braunschweig in 1996, with a thesis on fluorescence cross-correlation spectroscopy.

== Career ==
Schwille worked as a postdoctoral researcher at Cornell University in 1997, and returned to the Max Planck Institute for Biophysical Chemistry in Göttingen to a research group leader position in 1999. She became a professor of biophysics at TU Dresden in 2002. In 2012, Schwille became the director of the research department "Cellular and Molecular Biophysics" at the Max Planck Institute of Biochemistry in Martinsried, Germany, as well as an Honorary Professor in physics at LMU Munich. She is also a chief co-coordinator of MaxSynBio, a research network of the Max Planck Society for synthetic biology.

Schwille developed the "two-photon cross-correlation spectroscopy" method with which fundamental cellular processes can be explored.

Schwille has been a member of the scientific Board of Trustees of the Heinrich Wieland Prize since 2011.

== Awards and honors ==
=== Awards ===
- 2001: Lecturer award by the German Chemical Industry Fund
- 2003: Young Investigator Award for Biotechnology of the Peter und Traudl Engelhorn Foundation
- 2004: Philip Morris Research Prize
- 2010: Gottfried Wilhelm Leibniz Prize of the German Research Foundation (DFG)
- 2011: Braunschweig Research Prize
- 2013: Suffrage Science Award, MRC-CSC, London
- 2018: Bavarian Maximilian Order for Science and Art
- 2021: Otto Warburg Medal

=== Memberships and fellowships ===
- 2005: Max-Planck-Fellow of the MPI for Molecular Cell Biology and Genetics
- 2010: Member of the German National Academy of Sciences Leopoldina
- 2011: Member of the German Academy of Science and Engineering (acatech)
- 2013: Member of the Berlin-Brandenburg Academy of Sciences and Humanities
- 2013: Member of EMBO
- 2015: Honorary Fellow of the Royal Microscopical Society
- 2017: Fellow of the Biophysical Society
- 2018: Member of the Academia Europaea

== See also ==
- Fluorescence cross-correlation spectroscopy
- Timeline of women in science
