= Ninth Bridgewater Treatise =

1838 philosophical book by Charles Babbage

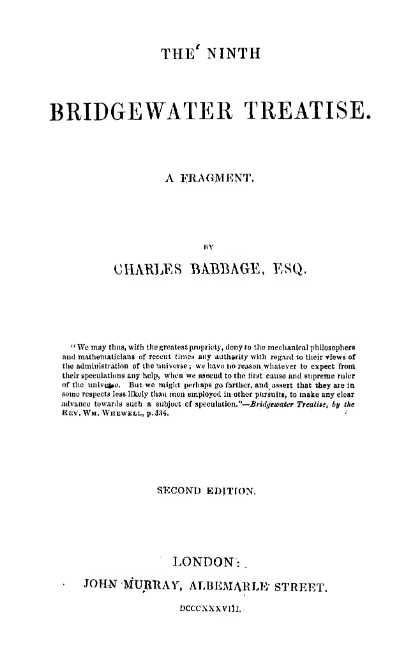
- Title page of the 2nd edition of the Ninth Bridgewater Treatise
- Author: Charles Babbage
- Original title: The Ninth Bridgewater Treatise: A Fragment
- Language: English
- Genres: Philosophy
- Published: 1838
- Publisher: John Murray, Albemarle Street, London
- Publication place: United Kingdom
- Media type: Print

The Ninth Bridgewater Treatise was published by the mathematician and inventor Charles Babbage in 1837 as a response to the eight Bridgewater Treatises that the Earl of Bridgewater, Francis Henry Egerton, 8th Earl, had funded. The Bridgewater Treatises were written by eight scientists and purported "to lend scientific support to belief in the existence of deity." Babbage was not one of the invited scientists, and the Ninth Bridgewater Treatise was thus an unauthorised continuation of the series.

The book specifically responded to a quotation from William Whewell's volume in the original treatises, which stands as an epigraph on the title page of Babbage's book. Whewell dismissed "mechanical philosophers and mathematicians" as irrelevant in discussions of the universe. Babbage argued that on the contrary, his experience programming the analytical engine, an early computer, enabled him to conceive of God that might design a complex, programmed world.

The book is a work of natural theology, an attempt to reconcile science and religion, and incorporates extracts from related correspondence of John Herschel with Charles Lyell. Babbage put forward the thesis that God had the omnipotence and foresight to create as a divine legislator. Scholars have noted that Babbage's God resembles a computer programmer not unlike Babbage himself. Literary critic Lanya Lamouria summarises this point thus: "rather than meddle with creation, the deity has the supreme 'foresight' to encode apparent adaptations and deviations into the universe from the beginning."

In the Ninth Bridgewater Treatise, Babbage dealt with relating interpretations between science and religion; on the one hand, he insisted that "there exists no fatal collision between the words of Scripture and the facts of nature;" on the one hand, he wrote the Book of Genesis was not meant to be read literally in relation to geological terms. Against those who said these were in conflict, he wrote "that the contradiction they have imagined can have no real existence, and that whilst the testimony of Moses remains unimpeached, we may also can be permitted to confide in the testimony of our senses."

Babbage dedicates a chapter to responding to philosopher David Hume, who in Of Miracles defined a miracle as "a violation of a law of nature". Rather than "deviations from the laws assigned by the Almighty" Babbage sees miracles as "the exact fulfilment of much more extensive laws than those we suppose to exist." In Lanya Lamourias words Babbage reframes miracles as "events that follow preprogrammed rules that are too complex for human comprehension."

Babbage proposes in the Treatise that the material world is a medium that records every sound uttered or action made. The world "is one vast library, on whose pages are for ever written all that man has ever said or woman whispered (...) the air we breathe is the never-failing historian of the sentiments we have uttered, earth, air and ocean, are the eternal witnesses of the acts we have done.” Scholars have argued that this inspired Charles Dickens's and his portrayal as memory as collective in David Copperfield and Edgar Allan Poe, whose character Agathos in "The Power of Word" claimed that these traces can be decoded mathematically.

Seth Bullock argues that Babbage's description of his difference engine in the chapter on miracles is the first evolutionary simulation model. Babbage argues that the engine could be programmed to generate a series of numbers according to one law, then at a pre-defined point, this could switch to another law, leading to an apparent discontinuity that is actually preprogrammed. This countered a common argument that discontinuity in the geological record would be proof of divine intervention. Natural theology arguments that attempted to reconcile science and religion in this way were common until Darwin's work on evolution.

== See also ==
- Charles Babbage#Religious views

== Bibliography ==
- Hyman, Anthony (1985). Charles Babbage: Pioneer of the Computer. Princeton University Press. pp. 136–142. ISBN 0-691-02377-8.
