= Keith R. Porter Lecture =

This lecture, named in memory of Keith R. Porter, is presented to an eminent cell biologist each year at the ASCB Annual Meeting. The ASCB Program Committee and the ASCB President recommend the Porter Lecturer to the Porter Endowment each year.

== Lecturers ==
Source: ASCB

- 2021 Rebecca W. Heald
- 2020 Tony Hyman
- 2019 Julie A. Theriot
- 2018 Ruth Lehmann
- 2017 Scott D. Emr
- 2016 Eva Nogales
- 2015 Jonathan S. Weissman
- 2014 Michael P. Sheetz
- 2013 Timothy J. Mitchison
- 2012 Ari Helenius
- 2011 Jennifer Lippincott-Schwartz
- 2010 Tom Rapoport
- 2009 Ronald Vale
- 2008 Joseph Gall
- 2007 Lucy Shapiro
- 2006 Joseph Schlessinger
- 2005 Randy Schekman
- 2004 Edward D. Salmon
- 2003 Roger Tsien
- 2002 Eric Wieschaus
- 2001 Susan Lindquist
- 2000 Joan Massague
- 1999 Elizabeth Blackburn
- 1998 James Spudich
- 1997 Pietro DeCamilli
- 1996 Elaine Fuchs
- 1995 Leland Hartwell
- 1994 James E. Darnell
- 1993 Masatoshi Takeichi
- 1992 Joan A. Steitz
- 1991 Christiane Nüsslein-Volhard
- 1990 Kai Simons
- 1989 Thomas D. Pollard
- 1988 Marc Kirschner
- 1987 Michael S. Brown and Joseph L. Goldstein
- 1986 Gunter Blobel
- 1985 John Heuser
- 1984 David D. Sabatini
- 1983 J. Richard McIntosh
- 1982 Lewis G. Tilney

== See also ==
- List of biology awards
