= Otto Warburg Medal =

Biochemistry and Biology award

The Otto Warburg Medal is awarded annually by the German Society for Biochemistry and Molecular Biology (German: Gesellschaft für Biochemie und Molekularbiologie or GBM) to honour scientists who have contributed important work in the field of biological chemistry. It is named after Otto Warburg, a renowned German physiologist and Nobel Prize laureate. It was first awarded on his 80th birthday on 8 October 1963.

As of 2025, ten Warburg Medal recipients have also been awarded the Nobel Prize.

== Medallists ==
Source: GBM

- 1963 – Feodor Lynen ^{1964}
- 1965 – Kurt Mothes
- 1968 – Michael Sela
- 1969 – Hans Adolf Krebs ^{1953} & Carl Martius
- 1972 – Ernst Klenk
- 1973 – Hans Leo Kornberg
- 1974 – Theodor Bücher
- 1975 – Helmut Holzer
- 1976 – Heinz-Günter Wittmann
- 1977 – Robert Huber ^{1988}
- 1978 – Wilhelm Stoffel
- 1979 – Lothar Jaenicke
- 1980 – Charles Weissmann
- 1981 – Martin Klingenberg
- 1982 – Rodulf Rott
- 1983 – Günter Blobel ^{1999}
- 1984 – Rudolf K. Thauer
- 1985 – Peter Starlinger
- 1986 – Julius Adler
- 1987 – Shosaku Numa
- 1988 – Gottfried Schatz
- 1989 – Hans Georg Zachau
- 1990 – Horst Tobias Witt
- 1991 – Dieter Oesterhelt
- 1992 – Christiane Nüsslein-Volhard ^{1995}
- 1993 – Max Perutz ^{1962}
- 1994 – Helmut Beinert
- 1995 – August Böck
- 1996 – Walter Jakob Gehring
- 1997 – Klaus Weber
- 1998 – Wolfgang Baumeister
- 1999 – Kurt Wüthrich ^{2002}
- 2000 – Walter Neupert
- 2001 – James Rothman ^{2013}
- 2002 – Kurt von Figura
- 2003 – Alfred Wittinghofer
- 2004 – Tom Rapoport
- 2005 – Axel Ullrich
- 2006 – Konrad Sandhoff
- 2007 – Robert Weinberg
- 2008 – Susan Lindquist
- 2009 – Franz-Ulrich Hartl
- 2010 – Ari Helenius
- 2011 – Peter Walter
- 2012 – Alexander Varshavsky
- 2013 – Randy Schekman ^{2013}
- 2014 – Rudolf Jaenisch
- 2015 – Nikolaus Pfanner
- 2016 – Emmanuelle Charpentier ^{2020}
- 2017 – Stefan Jentsch (posthumously)
- 2018 – Peter Hegemann ^{2026}
- 2019 – Marina Rodnina
- 2020 – Patrick Cramer
- 2021 – Petra Schwille
- 2022 – Stefanie Dimmeler
- 2023 – Matthias Mann
- 2024 – Johannes Buchner
- 2025 – Matthias Hentze
- 2026 – Maya Schuldiner

== See also ==
- List of biochemistry awards
- List of biology awards
- List of awards named after people
