= Eran Meshorer =

Israeli geneticist

- ערן משורר
- Born: May 12, 1971 (age 55)
- Education: Hebrew University
- Known for: Research in epigenetics, stem cells, and paleo-epigenetics
- Awards: Lilly-Molecular Psychiatry Award; Hestrin Prize
- Scientific career
- Fields: Epigenetics, Stem cells, paleo-epigenetics
- Workplaces: The Hebrew University of Jerusalem
- Website: http://meshorerlab.huji.ac.il/

Eran Meshorer (Hebrew: ערן משורר; born May 12, 1971) is an Israeli scientist, professor of epigenetics and stem cells at the Alexander Silberman Institute of Life Sciences, and the Edmond and Lily Safra Center for Brain Sciences, the Hebrew University of Jerusalem. Meshorer is the Arthur Gutterman Chair for Stem Cell Research.

== Biography ==
Meshorer was born and raised in Israel. He completed all his degrees at the Hebrew University. Meshorer earned his PhD in molecular neuroscience under the supervision of Hermona Soreq, where he studied long-lasting consequences of stress in the mammalian brain. Together with Soreq, he published his first book (in Hebrew) titled 'Stressed Out'. In 2004, Meshorer traveled to the United States for postdoctoral studies at the National Institutes of Health (NIH) in Bethesda, Maryland, where he specialized in epigenetics and embryonic stem cells in the research group of Tom Misteli. Meshorer showed for the first time the epigenetic plasticity of embryonic stem cells.

In 2007, Meshorer returned to Israel and established his 'Epigenetics, Stem Cells & Neurons' lab at the Department of Genetics, the Alexander Silberman Institute of Life Sciences, the Hebrew University of Jerusalem. In 2014, he was invited as a visiting professor to the Whitehead Institute, MIT, and the Broad Institute, where he spent half a year.

Eran is married to Tali Meshorer, a father of three, and lives in Neve Ilan.

== Research ==
Meshorer conducts experimental and computational research in the field of epigenetics, molecular biology, pluripotent stem cells, disease models, and epigenetics of ancient DNA. He published over a hundred papers in these fields, and edited several books including The Cell Biology of Stem Cells (2010) with Kathrin Plath (UCLA) and Stem Cell Epigenetics (2019) with Giuseppe Testa (IEO).

In a series of papers, Meshorer discovered the unique epigenetics of embryonic and cancer stem cells, and the mechanisms supporting it, and together with Gil Ast from Tel-Aviv University, they showed the connection between chromatin and splicing.

=== Paleo-Epigenetics ===
In 2014, in collaboration with Liran Carmel, they developed a computational technique to reconstruct genome-wide maps of DNA methylation (a key epigenetic mechanism) from ancient DNA sequences. They applied this technique to ancient DNA from Neanderthal and Denisovan, and thus were the first to reconstruct epigenetic patterns of archaic humans, and to identify genes that are differentially methylated between archaic and modern humans. These genes include many that are expressed in the brain, and are associated with neurological disorders such as Alzheimer's disease, autism and schizophrenia. This work was selected among the top ten discoveries of 2014 by Archaeology magazine.

In 2020 Carmel and Meshorer were able to show that the vocal and facial anatomy of modern humans differs from that of Neanderthals and Denisovans, which points at evolutionary processes during the past hundreds of thousands of years that affected the modern human voice box. In another collaboration with the Carmel lab, they generated a first anatomical profile of the Denisovan. This work was selected among the scientific breakthroughs of 2019 by Science magazine, and was selected among the 10 top stories of the year by Science News.

== Awards and honors ==
- For his PhD dissertation (2003), Meshorer received the Teva and ISBMB (Israel Society for Biochemistry and Molecular Biology) Award
- The Lilly-Molecular Psychiatry Award for best paper of 2005
- Alon Fellowship from the Israeli Council for Higher Education (2007)
- Elkes award from the National Institute for Psychobiology (2010)
- Klatchky Prize for the advancement of science (2012)
- Hestrin Prize from the Israel Society for Biochemistry and Molecular Biology (2012)
- Zelman Cowen Award for Biomedical Research, Hebrew University and University of Sydney (2013)
- Israel-Italy Vigevani Research Prize (2015)
- Gold Medal from Charles University, Prague (2016)
- International Society for Stem Cell Research (ISSCR) Public Service Award (2025)
- Elected EMBO Member, 2025
