= Ronald Vale =

American biochemist

Ronald David Vale
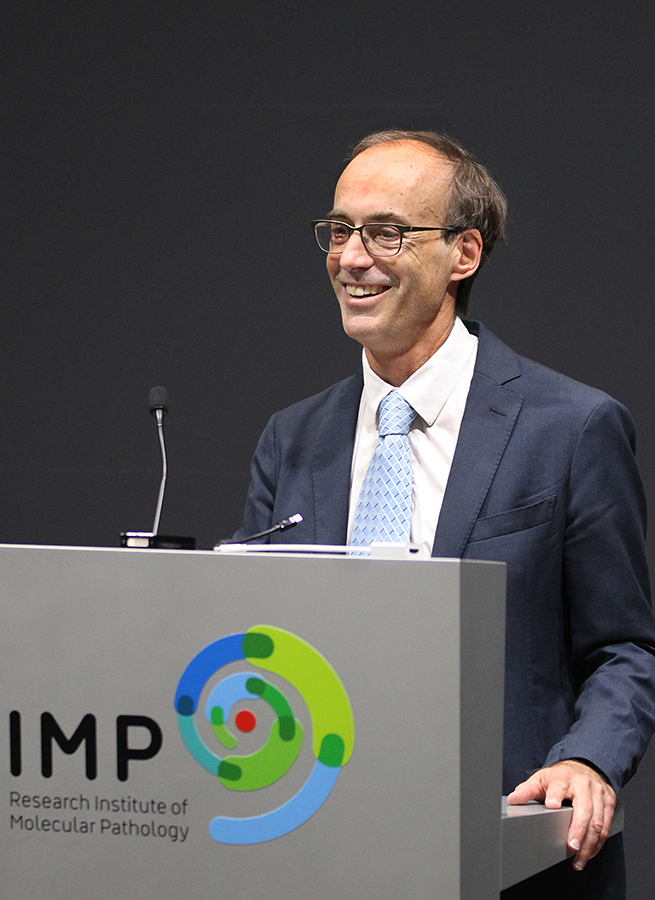
- Vale in September 2018
- Born: January 11, 1959 (age 67); Hollywood, California, US
- Education: Marine Biological Laboratory; Stanford University; University of California, Santa Barbara
- Known for: Research in molecular motors, particularly kinesin and dynein
- Awards: Shaw Prize in Life Science and Medicine (2017); Massry Prize (2013); Albert Lasker Award for Basic Medical Research (2012); Wiley Prize in Biomedical Sciences (2012)
- Scientific career
- Fields: Biochemistry; Cell Biology
- Workplaces: University of California, San Francisco; Howard Hughes Medical Institute
- Thesis: Nerve growth factor receptors and axonal transport (1985)
- Doctoral advisor: Eric Shooter

Ronald David Vale ForMemRS (born 1959) is an American biochemist and cell biologist. He is a member of the Whitehead Institute and professor of biology at Massachusetts Institute of Technology. His research is focused on motor proteins, particularly kinesin and dynein. He was awarded the Canada Gairdner International Award for Biomedical Research in 2019, the Shaw Prize in Life Science and Medicine in 2017 together with Ian Gibbons, and the Albert Lasker Award for Basic Medical Research in 2012 alongside Michael Sheetz and James Spudich. He is a fellow of the American Academy of Arts and Sciences and a member of the National Academy of Sciences. He was the president of the American Society for Cell Biology in 2012. He has also been an investigator at the Howard Hughes Medical Institute since 1995. Vale served as executive director of the Janelia Research Campus and a vice president of HHMI from 2020-2024. Vale is also an emeritus professor at the Department of Cellular and Molecular Pharmacology, University of California, San Francisco.

== Early life and education ==
Vale was born in Hollywood, California. His mother, Evelyn, was a former actress; his father, Eugene, was a novelist and screenwriter. He finished high school at Hollywood High School. For his grade 10 science project, he set up a laboratory at the basement of his home to investigate the circadian rhythm of bean plants. His guidance counselor contacted Karl Hammer at the University of California, Los Angeles, who allowed Vale to continue his experiments at his laboratory. His guidance counselor also encouraged Vale to submit his work to the Westinghouse Science Talent Search (now the Regeneron Science Talent Search), where he was selected as one of the top forty students in the US.

Vale is a first-generation university student. He entered the College of Creative Studies, University of California, Santa Barbara, and earned a bachelor's degree in chemistry and biology in 1980. During his study, he first worked at the laboratory of C. Fred Fox at UCLA, then at Robert Lefkowitz's group at Duke University, earning him two articles published in 1984 and 1982, respectively.

In 1980, Vale entered an MD/PhD program at Stanford University, supervised by Eric Shooter, where he studied the nerve growth factor receptor (also known as the neurotrophic factor receptor).

Vale obtained his PhD in neuroscience in 1985. He then spent one year as an NIH staff scientist in Tom Reese's laboratory at the Marine Biological Laboratory at Woods Hole, MA.

== Scientific career ==
While working on Nerve growth factor (NGF) receptors as a graduate student, Vale became interested in exploring the mechanism of how receptors and other molecules are transported in nerve axons. He then heard of the research of Michael Sheetz and James Spudich, who used a video camera on a microscope to film myosin-coated beads moving along actin filaments. In 1983, Vale and Sheetz decided to test whether the movement of myosin on actin was the source for organelle transport in axons, using the squid giant axon as a model. However, since no squid were caught that year at Stanford's Hopkins Marine Station, following Shooter's approval, they went to the Marine Biological Laboratory instead.

At the Marine Biological Laboratory, Vale and Sheetz teamed up with Bruce Schnapp and Tom Reese. They found that membrane organelle transport occurred bidirectionally on a microtubule, and not actin filament as Vale had originally thought. Vale further demonstrated that purified organelles by themselves rarely moved on microtubules, but movement was observed after adding the cytosol of the axon. He then discovered serendipitously that cytosol caused microtubules to translocate along a glass surface. Similarly, he found that cytosol-coated beads moved along microtubules. These two phenomena provided assays to study microtubule-based motility assay in vitro. In 1985, Vale, Sheetz and Reese isolated the dominant motor protein in the cytosol, naming it "kinesin." They showed that kinesin only moved in one direction towards the plus ends of microtubules and a second motor (later shown to be dynein by Richard Vallee) moved in the opposite direction. The results of Vale and colleagues on axonal transport were published in five papers in 1985.

Vale did not finish his MD, and joined the University of California, San Francisco as an assistant professor in 1986. He was promoted to associate professor in 1992 and then to full professor in 1994. In 1989, Vale, with Jonathan Howard and A. James Hudspeth developed a single molecular assay for kinesin. In 1991, he discovered the first protein that severed microtubules and later purified and named it katanin. In 1996, Vale and colleagues solved the crystal structure of the kinesin motor domain. and discovered unexpectedly that it is structurally similar to myosin. In that same year, working with Toshio Yanagida, Vale developed a single-molecule fluorescence assay for kinesin. In 1999, using various techniques, Vale and co-workers developed a mechanical model for how the two motor domains of the kinesin dimer walk in a "hand-over-hand" model along a microtubule.

Since 2003, Vale has focused on dynein, a motor protein discovered by Ian R. Gibbons in 1965. Although its discovery occurred 20 years before kinesin, its large size hampered its investigation. In 2006, Vale's laboratory prepared recombinant dynein from yeast, and elucidated how it walked on microtubules using single-molecule microscopy. He then worked with Gibbons to determine the structure of the dynein microtubule-binding domain. His team also solved the structure of the dynein motor domain. Vale has extended his research to other fields, including T-cell signalling and RNA biology.

In 2020, Vale was appointed as the second Executive Director of the Howard Hughes Medical Institute's Janelia Research Campus, following the inaugural directorship of Gerald M. Rubin. His directorship corresponded with the onset of the COVID-19 pandemic. As director, he oversaw the start of the 4D Cellular Physiology (4DCP) research area to understand how cells function in the context of tissues and how organismal physiology emerges from cellular function. He became the co-head of 4DCP upon the end of his directorship.

As Executive Director, Ron Vale highlighted efforts to accelerate the scientific review process, especially for early career researchers. This culminated in a workshop on recognizing peer review for preprints in 2022 and a publication.

In August 2024, Ron Vale was succeeded by Nelson Spruston as Executive Director and HHMI Vice President. Vale moved to the Whitehead Institue in December, 2025. He also holds an appointment as Professor in the Biology Department and Faculty Lead in Biology in Open Learning at MIT.

== Outreach ==
Vale founded iBiology in 2006, a non-profit organization that produces and disseminates free online videos by leading biologists, speaking about biological principles and their research, and scientific training and professional development for practicing scientists. Vale recently founded and produced The Explorer's Guide to Biology (XBio), a free online undergraduate "textbook" that provides a storytelling and discover-focused approach to learning biology.

Between 2004 and 2008, Vale and Tim Mitchison co-directed the Physiology Course at the Marine Biological Laboratory in Woods Hole, transforming it into an interdisciplinary training environment that brings together biologists, physicists and computational scientists.

In 2009, Vale established the Young Investigators' Meeting in India, which provides a mentoring and networking workshop for postdocs and junior faculty in India. Also in 2009, Vale founded the Bangalore Microscopy Course, held at the National Centre for Biological Research, which provides international training in light microscopy. He also organized an online microscopy course through iBiology.

Nico Stuurman and Vale also conceived of and developed Micro-Manager, a free and open-source microscopy software that was supported for many years through the Vale laboratory and now operates through the University of Wisconsin.

Vale has also advanced efforts to improve practices in scientific publishing in the life sciences. He founded ASAPbio (Accelerating Science Publication in Biology) in 2015, promoting the use and recognition of preprints biology. He advocated for open and transparent peer-review process, co-organized a workshop on recognizing peer review for preprints in 2022, and co-founded (with Maria Leptin) Review Commons, which organizes journal-agnostic peer review.

== Awards and honours ==
- American Chemical Society, Pfizer Award in Enzyme Chemistry (1991)
- Member of the National Academy of Sciences (2001)
- Fellow of the American Academy of Arts and Sciences (2002)
- American Society for Cell Biology, Keith R. Porter Lecture Award (2009)
- Wiley Prize in Biomedical Sciences (2012)
- Albert Lasker Award for Basic Medical Research (2012)
- Associate Member of the European Molecular Biology Organization (2012)
- Meira and Shaul G. Massry Foundation, Massry Prize (2013)
- Member of the National Academy of Medicine (formerly Institute of Medicine) (2014)
- Foreign Fellow of the Indian National Science Academy (2015)
- Shaw Prize in Life Science and Medicine (2017)
- Canada Gairdner International Award (2019)
