= Setsurō =

- Gender: Male

Origin
- Origin: Japanese
- Meaning: Different meanings depending on the kanji used

Setsurō, Setsuro or Setsurou (written: 節郎 or 節朗) is a masculine Japanese given name. Notable people with the name include:

- Setsuro Ebashi (江橋 節郎; 1922–2006), Japanese physiologist
- Setsurō Wakamatsu (若松 節朗), Japanese film director
