= Beate Sodeik =

German cell biologist

- Education: Heidelberg University; Columbia University Vagelos College of Physicians and Surgeons; University of Bonn
- Scientific career
- Workplaces: Hannover Medical School; Yale University
- Thesis: Das Assembly des Vaccinia-Virus (1992)

Beate Sodeik is a German cell biologist who is Professor of Medical Sciences at the Hannover Medical School. Her research considers the biology of viral infections, with a particular focus on Herpes simplex virus.

== Early life and education ==
Sodeik was an undergraduate student in the University of Bonn, where she studied biology. She earned a Diploma in Cell Biology, where she analysed autophagy in Amoeba proteus. After graduating, she received a DAAD scholarship, and moved to the Columbia University Vagelos College of Physicians and Surgeons. During her time at Columbia, Sodeik worked on integrin receptors of human neutrophils. She was a doctoral student in cell biology at the European Molecular Biology Laboratory in Heidelberg University. Her research considered the assembly of the Vaccina virus (cowpox). After earning her doctorate, Sodeik returned to the United States, where she joined Ari Helenius at Yale University. At Yale, Sodeik studied the early phases of Herpes simplex virus.

== Research and career ==
Sodeik was made a Senior Scientist at Hannover Medical School in 1997. She completed her habilitation in the cell biology of DNA viruses and the maturation of Vaccinia. She was eventually promoted to Professor. Since starting her postdoctoral research, Sodeik has explored the cell biology of Herpes simplex virus. She is interested in virus-host interactions, virus assembly and viral replication.

== Selected publications ==
- B Sodeik; M W Ebersold; A Helenius (1 March 1997). "Microtubule-mediated transport of incoming herpes simplex virus 1 capsids to the nucleus". Journal of Cell Biology. 136 (5): 1007–1021. doi:10.1083/jcb.136.5.1007. ISSN 0021-9525. PMC 2132479. PMID 9060466. Wikidata Q30442164.
- Katinka Döhner; André Wolfstein; Ute Prank; Christophe Echeverri; Denis Dujardin; Richard Vallee; Beate Sodeik (1 August 2002). "Function of dynein and dynactin in herpes simplex virus capsid transport". Molecular Biology of the Cell. 13 (8): 2795–2809. doi:10.1091/mbc.01-07-0348. ISSN 1059-1524. PMC 117943. PMID 12181347. Wikidata Q30453354.
- Schmelz M; Sodeik B; Ericsson M; Wolffe EJ; Shida H; Hiller G; Griffiths G (1 January 1994). "Assembly of vaccinia virus: the second wrapping cisterna is derived from the trans Golgi network". Journal of Virology. 68 (1): 130–147. doi:10.1128/jvi.68.1.130-147.1994. ISSN 0022-538X. PMC 236272. PMID 8254722. Wikidata Q36619094.
