= Liran Carmel =

Israeli scientist (born 1971)

- לירן כרמל
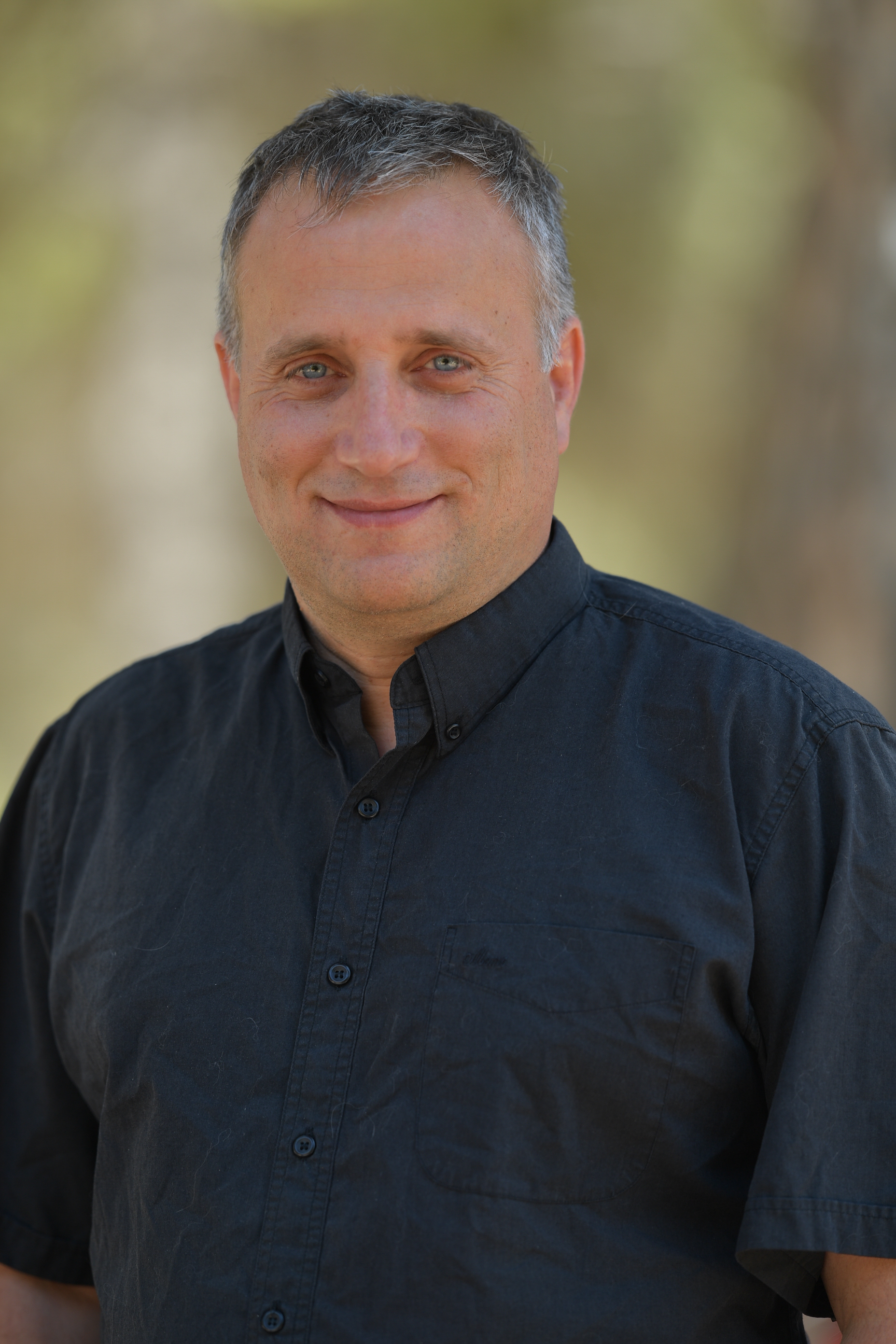
- Born: August 7, 1971 (age 55)
- Education: Tel-Aviv University, The Technion - Israel Institute of Technology, the Weizmann Institute of Science
- Known for: Research in molecular evolution, human evolution, molecular history and ancient DNA.
- Awards: Massry Prize (2021), Snyder Granadar chair in Genetics
- Scientific career
- Fields: Molecular evolution
- Workplaces: Hebrew University of Jerusalem
- Website: carmelab.huji.ac.il

Liran Carmel (Hebrew: לירן כרמל; born August 7, 1971) is an Israeli scientist, professor of computational biology at the Alexander Silberman Institute of Life Sciences, the Hebrew University of Jerusalem. Carmel is the Snyder Granadar Chair for Genetics, and is the 2021 Massry Prize laureate for his studies in the field of ancient DNA.

== Biography ==
Carmel was born and raised in Israel. He studied for a B.Sc. in physics in the Academic Atuda, and served in the military as a physicist in Rafael Advanced Defense Systems Ltd. During his military service, he obtained his M.Sc. degree in quantum mechanics at the Technion - Israel institute of technology, under the supervision of Ady Mann. After his military service, Carmel completed his Ph.D. degree in mathematics and computer science at the Weizmann Institute of Science, under the supervision of David Harel. In his Ph.D. Carmel developed algorithms for odor coding and digitization, and was head of the algorithms team in a company that developed means for computerized odor transmission. In 2004, Carmel went to the United States for postdoctoral studies at the National Institutes of Health (NIH) in Bethesda, Maryland, where he specialized in molecular evolution in the research group of Eugene Koonin.

Carmel returned to Israel in 2008, and established a computational biology research group at the department of Genetics, the Alexander Silberman Institute of Life Sciences, the Hebrew University of Jerusalem. In 2016 he was invited as a senior visiting professor to the University of New South Wales in Sydney, Australia, where he spent a year.

== Research ==
Carmel is studying computational molecular evolution, and is particularly interested in human evolution and ancient DNA. He published dozens of research papers in these fields.

In 2014, together with Professor Eran Meshorer, he developed a computational technique to reconstruct genome-wide maps of DNA methylation (a key epigenetic mechanism) from ancient DNA sequences. He applied this technique to ancient DNA from Neanderthal and Denisovan, and thus was the first to reconstruct epigenetic patterns of archaic humans, and to identify genes that are differentially methylated between archaic and modern humans. These genes include many that are expressed in the brain, and are associated with neurological disorders such as Alzheimer's disease, autism and schizophrenia. This work was selected among the top ten discoveries of 2014 by Archaeology magazine.

In 2017, Carmel developed a tool that identifies organs and body parts that are preferentially enriched within a set of genes. This tool helps in understanding how the human body is affected by changes in the expression levels of genes. Combining this tool with his studies on DNA methylation patterns in archaic humans, and together with Professor Eran Meshorer, Carmel showed in 2020 that the vocal and facial anatomy of modern humans differs from that of Neanderthals and Denisovans, which points at fascinating evolutionary processes during the past hundreds of thousands of years that affected the modern human voice box.

Very little is known about the anatomy of the Denisovan, as its confirmed physical remains include a finger, a few teeth and a lower jaw. In 2019, Carmel developed a computational technique which uses reconstructed DNA methylation maps in archaic humans together with medical information on the phenotypic effects of genes that underlie monogenic diseases, to generate an anatomical profile of archaic human groups. He applied this technique to the ancient DNA of a Denisovan girl to generate a first anatomical profile of these archaic humans. This work was selected among the scientific breakthroughs of 2019 by Science magazine, won 1st People's Choice of Science's breakthrough of 2019, and was selected among the 10 top stories of the year by Science News.

In 2020 Carmel published a study on the genetics of the Canaanites. In this work, he sequenced DNA from dozens of Canaanite individuals that used to live in the Southern Levant during the Bronze Age, in sites such as Megiddo and Hazor. Carmel found that the Canaanites formed as an admixture of local populations with people that arrived from the north-east, from regions that today include western Iran and the Caucasus, and that the process continued for hundreds of years. Carmel also found that the different Canaanite populations across the Southern Levant belonged to the same genetic population. In this study Carmel developed a method which he used to show that the ancient Bronze Age populations from the Southern Levant, Caucasus and western Iran substantially contributed to the genetics of present-day Levantine populations such as Jewish groups and Arabic-speaking groups.

== Awards and honors ==
- Carmel is the 2021 laureate of the Massry Prize, which he won together with Professors Svante Pääbo and David Reich, for his contributions to the field of ancient DNA.
- The 2019 Michael Milken prize.
