= Marina Rodnina =

German biochemist (born 1960)

Marina V. Rodnina (born 19 November 1960) is a German biochemist.

== Life ==
Born in Kiev, Rodnina studied biology at the University of Kiev and obtained her PhD in molecular biology and genetics in 1989. From 1990 to 1992, she was a research fellow of the Alexander von Humboldt Foundation at the Witten/Herdecke University. Afterwards, she was a research assistant at the same university and she received her habilitation in 1997. From 1998 to 2008, she was a professor at the Witten/Herdecke University. Since 2008, she is a scientific member and the director of the Max Planck Institute for Biophysical Chemistry.

== Research ==
Rodnina's research focuses on protein synthesis by and function on the ribosome. In collaboration with colleagues, she was the first to visualize the activity of a ribosome with the help of a 3D cryo-electron microscope.

== Awards ==
Rodnina is a member of the Göttingen Academy of Sciences and Humanities and the Academy of Sciences Leopoldina. She was awarded the Hans Neurath Award in 2015, the Gottfried Wilhelm Leibniz Prize in 2016, and the Otto Warburg Medal in 2019.

== Select publications ==
- Mihaela Diaconu; Ute Kothe; Frank Schlünzen; et al. (1 July 2005). "Structural basis for the function of the ribosomal L7/12 stalk in factor binding and GTPase activation". Cell. 121 (7): 991–1004. doi:10.1016/J.CELL.2005.04.015. ISSN 0092-8674. PMID 15989950. Wikidata Q41627064.
- Stark H; Marina Rodnina; Rinke-Appel J; Brimacombe R; Wintermeyer W; van Heel M (1 September 1997). "Visualization of elongation factor Tu on the Escherichia coli ribosome". Nature. 389 (6649): 403–406. doi:10.1038/38770. ISSN 1476-4687. PMID 9311785. Wikidata Q54558215.
- Niels Fischer; Andrey L. Konevega; Wolfgang Wintermeyer; Marina Rodnina; Holger Stark (1 July 2010). "Ribosome dynamics and tRNA movement by time-resolved electron cryomicroscopy". Nature. 466 (7304): 329–333. doi:10.1038/NATURE09206. ISSN 1476-4687. PMID 20631791. Wikidata Q41618424.
