= Ian R. Gibbons =

English biophysicist and cell biologist

Ian Read Gibbons FRS
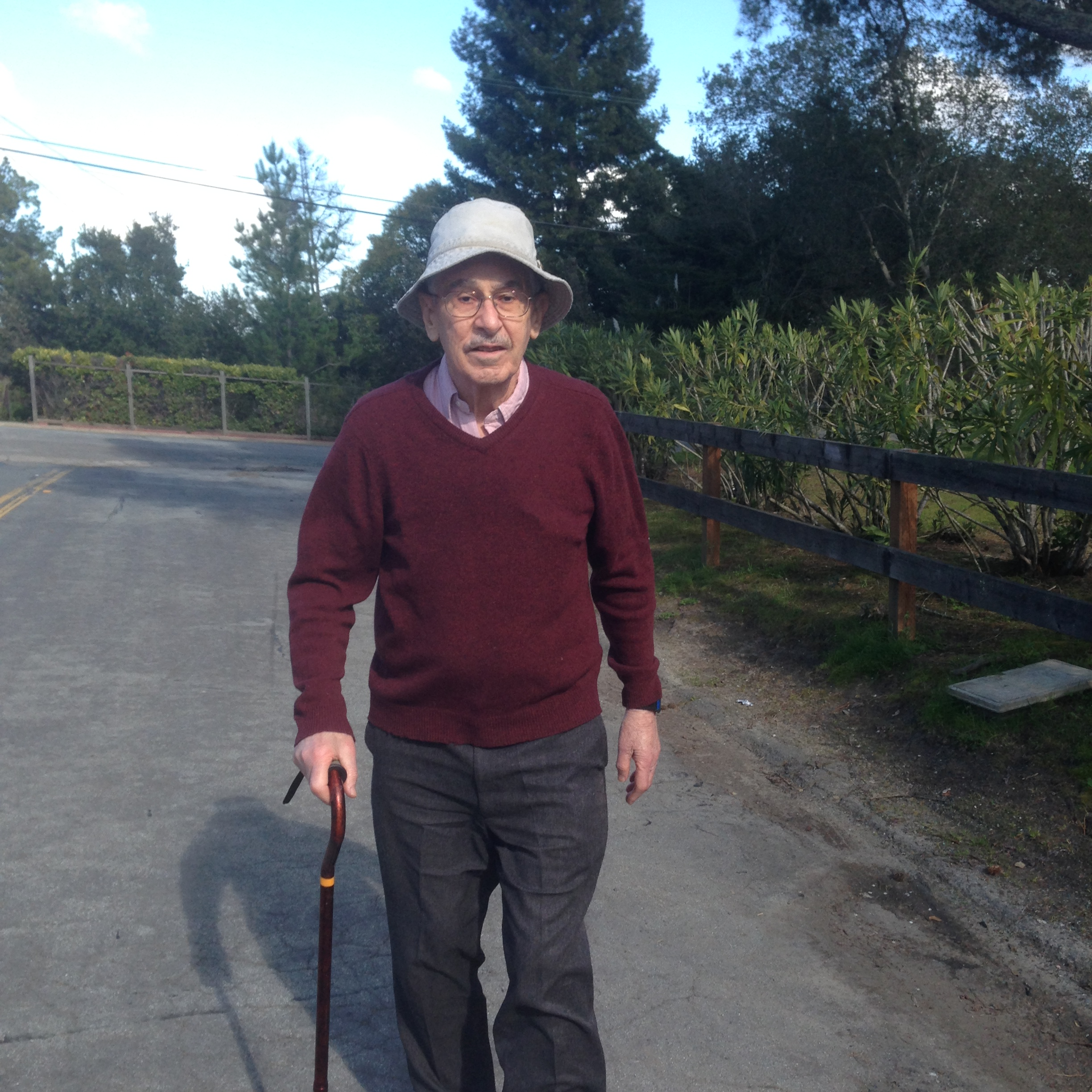
- Born: 30 October 1931; Rye, East Sussex, England
- Died: 30 January 2018 (aged 86); Orinda, California, United States
- Education: University of Pennsylvania; King's College, Cambridge
- Known for: Research in dynein
- Spouse: Barbara Gibbons (1961 to 2013)
- Children: 2
- Awards: Shaw Prize in Life Science and Medicine (2017); International Prize for Biology (1995); E.B. Wilson Medal (1994)
- Scientific career
- Fields: Biophysics; Cell biology
- Workplaces: University of California, Berkeley; University of Hawaiʻi at Mānoa; Harvard University
- Doctoral advisor: John Bradfield

Ian Read Gibbons, FRS (30 October 1931 – 30 January 2018) was a biophysicist and cell biologist. He discovered and named dynein, and demonstrated energy source as ATP is sufficient for dynein to walk on microtubules. In 2017, he and Ronald Vale received the Shaw Prize for their research on microtubule motor proteins.

He was elected a Fellow of the Royal Society of Great Britain in 1983. The Society stated:

He discovered, named and characterised the founding member of the dynein ATPase family of motor proteins and other microtubular components in cilia and flagella. By elegantly combining biochemical techniques with light and electron microscopy, he greatly advanced our understanding of microtubule-based motility, particularly by the direct visual demonstration of active dynein-dependent sliding between adjacent microtubules in structurally weakened flagella.

== Early life and education ==
Gibbons's passion for science stemmed from his interest in radio. He entered Queen Elizabeth's Grammar School in Faversham in 1943, where he developed an interest towards applied physics. Following 18 months in the Royal Air Force as a radar engineer, he was admitted into King's College, Cambridge, in 1951 to read physics. He graduated with a bachelor's degree and then, in 1957, a PhD degree from Cambridge. His PhD research concerns using electron microscopes to study the organisation of chromosomes during mitosis and meiosis. Gibbons then went to the University of Pennsylvania as a postdoctoral researcher, where he stayed for 1 year. He subsequently moved to the Department of Biology, Harvard University, to take up the post of director of the newly founded electron microscopy laboratory.

== Academic and research career ==
While at Harvard, Gibbons studied the structure of cilia and flagella of a protozoan called Tetrahymena with electron microscopes. In 1963, he discovered a novel protein on microtubules and published its pictures. Two years later, he purified two regions of the protein, known as its two "arms", naming the protein "dynein". During his last year at Harvard, Gibbons demonstrated the protein making up microtubules was distinct from actin, in that the former was associated with guanine nucleotides while the latter with adenine nucleotides, but refrained from naming it; Hideo Mohri from the University of Tokyo named it tubulin afterwards.

Gibbons moved to the Kewalo Marine Laboratory, University of Hawaiʻi at Mānoa, in 1967 as an associate professor. He found the cilia of sea urchin sperms easier to work with than the cilia and flagella of Tetrahymena. In 1969, he was promoted to professor of biophysics. Throughout the 1970s, Gibbons and his wife Barbara showed the sliding of microtubules caused cilia motility (known as the sliding tubule mechanism), and that this sliding was dependent on the energy generated from ATP hydrolysis by ATPase. When microtubules visibly slid out of the ends of the flagellar fiber, the flagella disintegrated. He then extended the mechanism to mammals, confirming the motility mechanism of bull sperm cilia is the same as that for sea urchins. After these findings, Gibbons switched his focus to the molecular biology of dyneins, and determined the DNA sequence of the largest subunit of dynein in 1991. In 1993, he became the director of the Kewalo Marine Laboratory.

Ian and Barbara Gibbons retired from the University of Hawaiʻi at Mānoa in 1997; he went to the University of California, Berkeley as a research scientist in the laboratory of Beth Burnside. In 2009, Burnside closed her laboratory, and Gibbons became a visiting researcher.

== Honours and awards ==
- Shaw Prize in Life Science and Medicine (2017)
- International Prize for Biology, Japan Society for the Promotion of Science (1995)
- E.B. Wilson Medal, American Society for Cell Biology (1994)
- Fellow of the Royal Society (1983)
- Guggenheim Fellowship in Molecular and Cellular Biology, John Simon Guggenheim Memorial Foundation (1973)

== Personal life ==
Gibbons met his wife Barbara while in Harvard University; they married in 1961. Barbara died in 2013 at age 81. Gibbons also died in 2018.
