= Alfred Wittinghofer =

German biochemist

Alfred "Fred" Wittinghofer (born 23 May 1943) is a German biochemist.

== Education and career ==
At RWTH Aachen University he studied chemistry from 1963 with Diplom in 1968 and with doctorate (Promotion) in 1971. His doctoral work was done at RWTH Aachen University's Deutsches Wollforschungsinstitut (now called the DWI – Leibniz-Institut für Interaktive Materialien). He worked from 1971 to 1973 as a postdoc at the University of North Carolina. At Heidelberg's Max Planck Institute for Medical Research he was 1974 from 1979 a scientific assistant and 1980 from 1993 a research group leader. In 1992 he completed his habilitation in biochemistry at the University of Heidelberg. At Dortmund's Max Planck Institute for Molecular Physiology, he was from 1993 to 2009 director of the structural biology department and from 2009 to 2016 "Emeritus Scientific Member" of the institute. From 1994 to 2009 he was Honorarprofessor for biochemistry at the Ruhr University Bochum.

Wittinghofer and colleagues examined the structure, function and mode of action of the oncogene product Ras.

He has received at least a dozen honors and awards. He was elected in 1995 a member of the European Molecular Biology Organization (EMBO) and in 2001 a member of both Academia Europaea and the German National Academy of Sciences Leopoldina. He was awarded in 2001 the Louis-Jeantet Prize for Medicine, in 2003 the Otto Warburg Medal, and in 2019 the STS Honorary Medal from the Signal Transduction Society/Gesellschaft für Signaltransduktion and the International Journal of Molecular Sciences.
