= Otto Thomas Solbrig =

Argentinian botanist (1930–2023)

Otto Thomas Solbrig (21 December 1930 – 8 April 2023) was an Argentine evolutionary biologist and botanist. His research dealt with ecology and biodiversity of the Argentine and Uruguayan Pampas, Cerrado and sustainable agriculture.

The standard author abbreviation Solbrig is used to indicate this person as the author when citing a botanical name.

== Life and career ==
Solbrig was born in Buenos Aires on 21 December 1930. From 1950 to 1954, he studied for an undergraduate biology degree at National University of La Plata however before completing the formal requirements for this degree he was expelled from university and imprisoned without trial by the government of Juan Perón in 1955 for three months in relation to his involvement with student politics. He later emigrated to the United States where he would obtain a PhD in botany at University of California, Berkeley. Between 1959 and 1966 Solbrig served as curator for Harvard's Gray Herbarium, after which he accepted a faculty position at the University of Michigan for three years before returning to Harvard. He was emeritus professor of biology at Harvard University until his retirement in 2002.

Solbrig died on 8 April 2023, at the age of 92. He was a resident of Harvard, MA.

== Awards ==
- 1969: Master Honoris Causa from Harvard University, 1969
- 1975: Guggenheim Fellowship
- 1991: Extraordinary professor honoris causa, faculty of agronomy, National University of La Plata
- 1993: Distinguished Professor honoris causa, National University of Mar del Plata
- 1995: Professor honorario honoris causa, Faculty of philosophy, University of Buenos Aires
- 1995: Fellow of The World Academy of Sciences
- 1997: Doctor in agronomy honoris causa, National University of Lomas de Zamora
- 1998: International Prize for Biology
