= Emil Heitz =

Emil Heitz (born 19 October 1892 in Strasbourg, then part of the German Empire - died 8 July 1965 in Lugano, Switzerland) was a German-Swiss botanist and geneticist.

In 1928, Heitz detected differences along chromosomes that correlated with linear arrangement of genes, suggesting the terms euchromatin and heterochromatin for differences detectable by suitable chromosomal stains. His subsequent studies developed what he called cytological genetics, laying the ground for what is now termed cytogenetics.

In November 1933 Heitz was a signatory of the Vow of allegiance of the Professors of the German Universities and High-Schools to Adolf Hitler and the National Socialistic State.

In 1955, Heitz was the first winner of the Schleiden Medal.
