= Helmut Beinert =

American biochemist (1913–2007)

- Born: 17 November 1913; Lahr, Germany
- Died: 21 December 2007 (aged 94); Madison, Wisconsin
- Education: University of Leipzig, University of Heidelberg
- Known for: Metalloenzymes and iron-sulfur proteins
- Awards: Warburg Medal
- Scientific career
- Fields: Biochemistry
- Workplaces: University of Wisconsin-Madison

Helmut Beinert (17 November 1913 – 21 December 2007) was a professor in the biochemistry department at the University of Wisconsin–Madison. His research focused on the mechanism of enzymes, in particular metalloenzymes and iron-sulfur proteins. He was elected to the National Academy of Sciences in 1980.

== Early life and education ==
Beinert was born in Lahr, Germany on 17 November 1913. He studied in the classical traditions of time, and his bachelor's education consisted of Latin, mathematics, Greek and French, along with the physical sciences. After graduation he became a professional actor, but was subsequently drafted into the army. He left the army and studied chemistry at the University of Leipzig and the University of Heidelberg, eventually completing his thesis work in 1943 at the Kaiser-Wilhelm Institute for Medical Research in Heidelberg.

== Career ==
In 1950 Beinert came to the University of Wisconsin–Madison's Institute for Enzyme Research to carryout his postdoctoral work. He joined the faculty at the Institute in 1952, and became a full professor in 1962. In 1984 he left Madison and joined the faculty at the Medical College of Wisconsin in Milwaukee, where he remained until 1994. He moved back to Madison, and maintained a loose affiliation with the biochemistry department at the University of Wisconsin–Madison until his death in 2007. He is often credited with being both a pioneer and advocate for the use of electron paramagnetic resonance in biological systems, a technique used to study compounds that have unpaired electrons. He was also an early promoter of the field of bioinorganic chemistry.

== Selected awards and distinctions ==
- 1979 - Fellow of the American Academy of Arts and Sciences
- 1980 - Elected to the National Academy of Sciences
- 1985 - Keilin Medal from the British Biochemical Society
- 1989 - Sir Hans Krebs Medal from the Federation of European Biochemical Societies
- 1994 - Otto Warburg Medal from the Society for Biochemistry and Molecular Biology, Germany
