= Stephan Grill =

German biophysicist (born 1974)

Portrait of Prof. Stephan Grill

Stephan Wolfgang Grill (born 5 May 1974 in Heidelberg) is a German biophysicist.

== Education ==
Grill studied physics at the University of Heidelberg. He then worked at the European Molecular Biology Laboratory (EMBL) in Heidelberg with Anthony Hyman and Ernst Stelzer, which led to his PhD on The mechanics of asymmetric spindle positioning in the Caenorhabditis elegans embryo in 2002 (PhD officially awarded at the Technical University of Munich).

== Career and research ==
As a postdoctoral fellow, he worked at the Max Planck Institute for Molecular Cell Biology and Genetics in Dresden and with Carlos Bustamante at the Lawrence Berkeley National Laboratory and the University of Berkeley as a Helen Hay Whitney Foundation Postdoctoral Fellow. As of 2006, he was a junior research group leader at the Max Planck Institute of Molecular Cell Biology and Genetics and at the Max Planck Institute for the Physics of Complex Systems in Dresden. In 2009, he held a deputy professorship at the Leipzig University, where he habilitated in 2013. Grill was Professor of Biophysics at the Biotechnology Center of the TU Dresden from 2013 to 2019. Since October 2018, he has been a Scientific Member of the Max Planck Society and Director at the Max Planck Institute of Molecular Cell Biology and Genetics in Dresden.

From 2019 to 2021, Grill was the speaker of the Physics of Life Cluster of Excellence at the Technische Universität Dresden, where he is also an honorary professor at the Faculty of Physics.

Grill was one of the editors of the journal Physical Review Letters from 2014 to 2019.

Physics of Life

With his research group, Grill studies the mechanisms by which structure and form arises in living systems. In this context, he is interested in the role of mechanical processes in cell differentiation (meiosis in C. elegans such as the distribution of chromosomes during division via the formation of the spindle apparatus and division of cellular components via the contraction of a fine network of molecules similar to those in muscle) and their connection with molecular processes (e. e.g. given via chemical gradients). In this context, he developed a method of revealing mechanical stresses in the cell by selectively cutting through cellular structures with lasers (laser-assisted non-invasive cellular microsurgery). He already developed this method at EMBL. For the study of cell division, he used genetic engineering techniques to selectively stain parts of the cell's contractile network, making them visible and selectively severable for the laser. The degree of divergence after severing was a measure of the tension.

At Berkeley, he began his second field of research, the direct observation of molecules during the transcription of DNA into RNA. Here he was able to follow the movement of the RNA polymerase II responsible for this along the DNA strand, which not only moves in one direction but also jumps back and forth. This reflects control processes and correction processes during transcription that reduce the error rate.

== Honors and Memberships ==
In 2010, Grill received the EMBO Young Investigator Award. In 2011, he was awarded the Paul Ehrlich and Ludwig Darmstaedter Prize for young scientists. In 2015 Grill was awarded the Sackler Prize for Biophysics, and in 2017 he was elected to the European Molecular Biology Organization.
