= Ryszard Kole =

Polish-American pharmacologist

- Education: University of Warsaw; Polish Academy of Sciences
- Awards: OTS Lifetime Achievement Award (2020); Massry Prize (2019); American Cancer Society Junior Faculty Award (1986)
- Scientific career
- Fields: Pharmacology; Biotechnology
- Workplaces: University of North Carolina at Chapel Hill

Ryszard Kole (Polish: [ˈrɨʂard ˈkɔlɛ]) is a Polish–American pharmacologist and professor emeritus in the Pharmacology Department at the UNC School of Medicine within the University of North Carolina at Chapel Hill. He is known for his research on control of gene expression by antisense oligonucleotides and messenger RNA-based therapeutics. He is the recipient of the 2019 Massry Prize.

== Life and career ==
He graduated in chemistry from the University of Warsaw in 1969. Between 1970–1977, he held the position of senior research associate at the Institute of Biochemistry and Biophysics of the Polish Academy of Sciences (PAN), where he obtained his PhD degree. His research there mostly concerned the role of ribonucleases on cell function.

In 1977, he moved to the United States where, as a postdoctoral fellow, he trained with Sidney Altman and Sherman Wiseman at Yale University. In 1983, joined the faculty of the University of North Carolina at Chapel Hill as Professor of Pharmacology.

In 2019, he became the joint recipient of the Massry Prize, alongside Stanley T. Crooke, for "their seminal work in the development of oligonucleotides targeting messenger RNA as novel therapeutics for a wide range human diseases".

== See also ==
- List of Polish scientists
- List of Polish-Americans
