= Schleiden Medal =

The Schleiden Medal is an award given by the Academy of Sciences Leopoldina, the National Academy of Germany, to honour outstanding achievements in the field of cellular biology. The award is named after botanist Matthias Jakob Schleiden.

== Recipients ==
- 1955 : Emil Heitz
- 1958 : Albert Frey-Wyssling
- 1961 : Jean Brachet (co-recipient)
- 1973 : Irene Manton & Torbjörn Caspersson
- 1975 : Wilhelm Bernhard
- 1977 : Karl-Ernst Wohlfarth-Bottermann
- 1980 : Karl Lennert
- 1983 : Berta Scharrer
- 1985 : George Emil Palade
- 1987 : Zdeněk Lojda
- 1989 : A. G. Everson Pearse
- 1991 : Peter Sitte
- 1993 : Gottfried Schatz
- 1995 : Philipp U. Heitz
- 1998 : Avram Hershko
- 1999 : Walter Neupert
- 2001 : Kai Simons
- 2003 : Ari Helenius
- 2005 : Wolfgang Baumeister
- 2007 : Alexander Varshavsky
- 2009 : Thomas Cremer
- 2011 : Tom Rapoport
- 2013 : Ingrid Grummt
- 2015 : Johannes Buchner
- 2017 : Anthony A. Hyman
- 2019 : Elena Conti
- 2021 : Nikolaus Pfanner
- 2023 : Franz-Ulrich Hartl
- 2025 : Elly Tanaka

== See also ==
- List of biology awards
