= Massry Prize =

Biomedical award

The Massry Prize was established in 1996, and is administered by the Meira and Shaul G. Massry Foundation. The Prize, of $40,000 and the Massry Lectureship, is bestowed upon scientists who have made substantial recent contributions in the biomedical sciences. Shaul G. Massry, M.D., who established the Massry Foundation, is Professor Emeritus of Medicine and Physiology and Biophysics at the Keck School of Medicine, University of Southern California. He served as Chief of its Division of Nephrology from 1974 to 2000. In 2009 the KECK School of Medicine was asked to administer the Prize, and has done so since that time. Out of 25 prizes bestowed until 2021, fourteen were awarded to future Nobel Prize winners. No Massry Prize was awarded in 2020, 2022 and 2023.

Awardees are nominated by a scientific committee composed of faculty and researchers from Keck School of Medicine of USC, David Geffen School of Medicine at UCLA, and Cedars-Sinai Medical Center.

== Previous laureates ==
Source: KECK School of Medicine

- 1996 Michael Berridge in the field of Signal Transduction
- 1997 Judah Folkman in the field of Growth Factors
- 1998 Mark Ptashne in the field of Regulation of Transcription
- 1999 Gunter Blobel in the field of Protein Trafficking. Blobel won the 1999 Nobel Prize in Physiology and Medicine two months after his receipt of the Massry Prize.
- 2000 Leland H. Hartwell in the field of Cell Cycle. Hartwell won the 2001 Nobel Prize in Physiology and Medicine one year after he received the Massry Prize.
- 2001 Avram Hershko and Alexander Varshavsky in the field of Proteolysis and the Ubiquitin System. Hershko won the 2004 Nobel Prize in Chemistry three years after he received the Massry Prize.
- 2002 Mario Capecchi and Oliver Smithies for their pioneering work on Gene targeting. They won the 2007 Nobel Prize in Physiology and Medicine five years after they received the Massry Prize.
- 2003 Roger Kornberg, David Allis and Michael Grunstein in the field of Nuclear Chromatin. Kornberg won the 2006 Nobel Prize in Chemistry three years after he received the Massry Prize.
- 2004 Ada Yonath and Harry Nolla in the field of Ribosomal Structure. Yonath won the 2009 Nobel Prize in Chemistry five years after she received the Massry Prize.
- 2005 Andrew Fire, Craig Mello and David Baulcombe in the field of RNAi. Fire and Mello won the 2006 Nobel Prize in Physiology and Medicine one year after they received the Massry Prize.
- 2006 Akira Endo in the field of Novel Therapies specifically for the Discovery of Statins
- 2007 Michael Phelps for the development of the PET Scan and its Clinical Application
- 2008 Shinya Yamanaka, James A. Thomson, and Rudolf Jaenisch for their work in the field of Induced Pluripotent Stem Cells. Yamanaka won the 2012 Nobel Prize in Physiology and Medicine four years after he received the Massry Prize.
- 2009 Gary Ruvkun and Victor Ambros for their work in the field of Micro RNA. They won the 2024 Nobel Prize in Physiology and Medicine fifteen years after they received the Massry Prize.
- 2010 Randy Schekman for his work regarding the molecular mechanism of defects in secretion that lead to human diseases of development such as spina bifida. He won the 2013 Nobel in Physiology and Medicine three years after he received the Massry Prize.
- 2011 Franz-Ulrich Hartl and Arthur Horwich for work on Chaperone-assisted protein folding
- 2012 Michael Rosbash, Jeffrey C. Hall and Michael W. Young for their studies of the molecular basis of circadian rhythms. They won the 2017 Nobel Prize in Physiology and Medicine five years after they received the Massry Prize.
- 2013 Michael Sheetz, James A. Spudich and Ronald D. Vale for their work defining molecular mechanisms of intracellular motility
- 2014 Steven Rosenberg, Zelig Eshhar and James P. Allison for their research on T cells.
- 2015 Philippe Horvath, Jennifer Doudna and Emmanuelle Charpentier for their research on gene editing. Doudna and Charpentier won the 2020 Nobel Prize in Chemistry five years after they received the Massry Prize.
- 2016 Gero Miesenböck, Peter Hegemann, Karl Deisseroth for their research on optogenetics.
- 2017 Rob Knight, Jeffrey Gordon, Norman R. Pace for their discovery of the microbiomes.
- 2018 Gregg Semenza, William Kaelin Jr., Peter J. Ratcliffe for their work on hypoxia. They won the 2019 Nobel Prize in Physiology and Medicine less than a year after they received the Massry Prize.
- 2019 Ryszard Kole, Stanley T. Crooke for their seminal work in the development of oligonucleotides targeting messenger RNA as novel therapeutics for a wide range human diseases.
- 2021 Svante Pääbo, David Reich, Liran Carmel for the discovery of ancient DNA. Pääbo won the 2022 Nobel Prize in Physiology and Medicine less than a year after he received the Massry Prize.

== See also ==
- List of biomedical science awards
