= International Prize for Biology =

- Awarded for: Outstanding contribution to the advancement of research in fundamental biology
- Country: Japan
- Presented by: Japan Society for the Promotion of Science
- First award: 1985
- Website: http://www.jsps.go.jp/english/e-biol/index.html

The International Prize for Biology (国際生物学賞, Kokusai Seibutsugaku-shō) is an annual award for "outstanding contribution to the advancement of research in fundamental biology." The Prize, although it is not always awarded to a biologist, is one of the most prestigious honours a natural scientist can receive. There are no restrictions on the nationality of the recipient.

Past laureates include John B. Gurdon, Motoo Kimura, Edward O. Wilson, Ernst Mayr, Thomas Cavalier-Smith, Yoshinori Ohsumi and many other great biologists in the world.

== Information ==
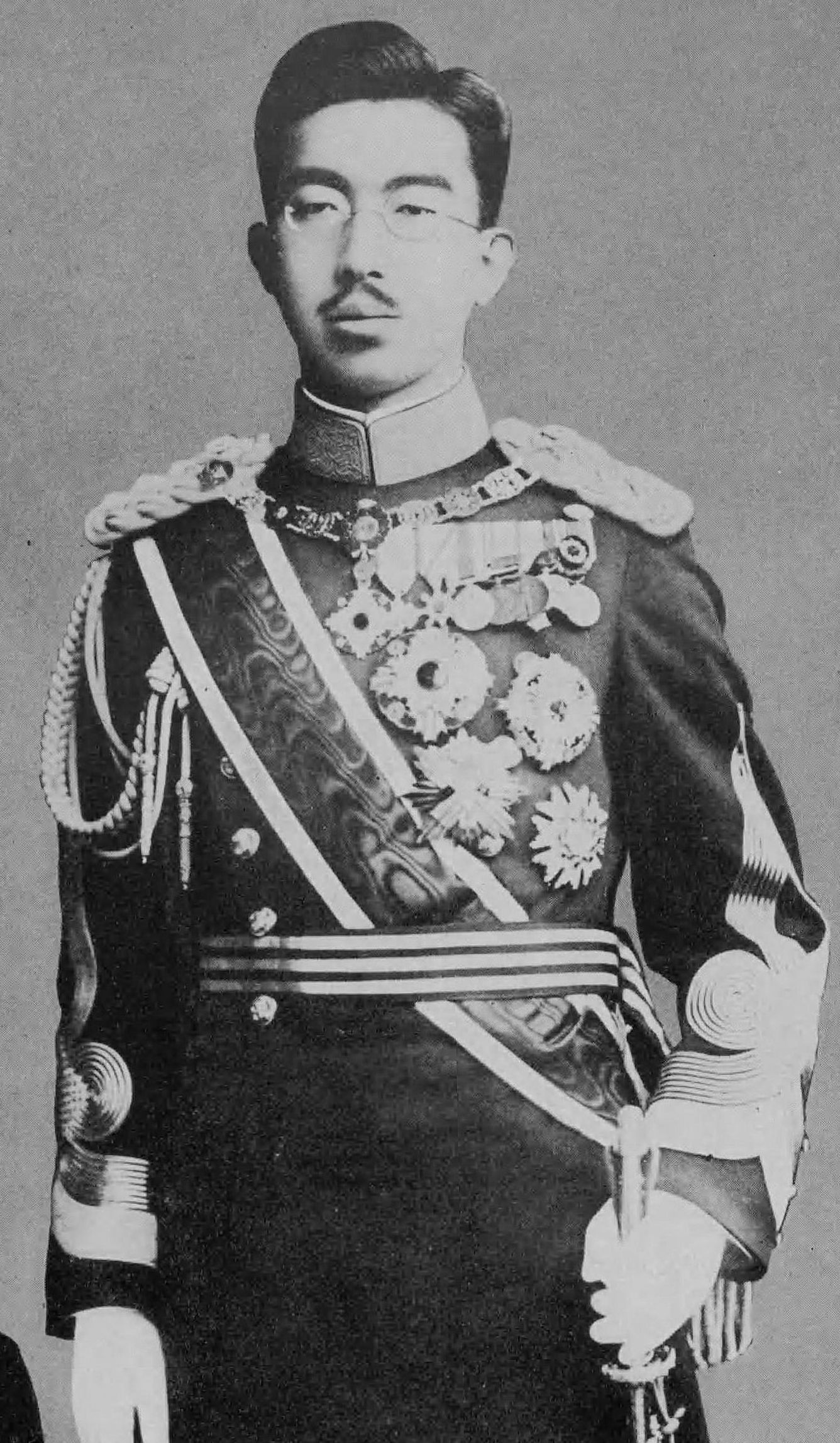
Emperor Shōwa

The International Prize of Biology was created in 1985 to commemorate the 60-year reign of Emperor Shōwa of Japan and his longtime interest in and support of biology. The selection and award of the prize is managed by the Japan Society for the Promotion of Science. The laureate is awarded a beautiful medal, 10 million yen, and an international symposium on the scientist's area of research is held in Tokyo. The prize ceremony is held in the presence of Emperor of Japan.

The first International Prize for Biology was awarded to E. J. H. Corner, who was a prominent scientist in the field of systematic biology, because Emperor Shōwa was interested in and worked on this field for long time.

== Criteria ==
The Prize is awarded in accordance with the following criteria:

- The Prize shall be made by the Committee every year, commencing in 1985.
- The Prize shall consist of a medal and a prize of ten million (10,000,000) yen.
- There shall be no restrictions on the nationality of the recipient.
- The Prize shall be awarded to an individual who, in the judgment of the members of the Committee, has made an outstanding contribution to the advancement of research in fundamental biology.
- The specialty within the field of biology for which the Prize will be awarded shall be decided upon annually by the Committee.
- The Committee shall be advised on suitable candidates for the Prize by a selection committee, which will consist of Japanese and overseas members.
- The selection committee shall invite nominations of candidates from such relevant individuals and organizations at home and abroad as the selection committee may deem appropriate.
- The selection committee shall submit to the Committee a report containing recommendations of the candidate for the Prize and supporting statement.
- The Prize shall be presented every year. In conjunction with the ceremony, an international symposium is held in which the Prize recipient is invited to give a special lecture.

== Background ==
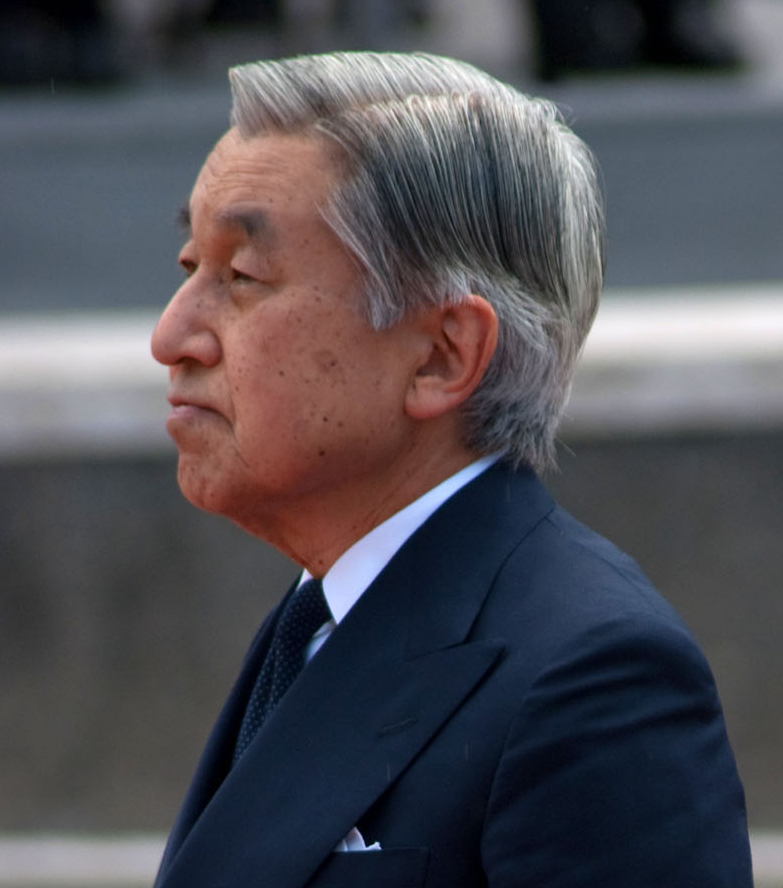
Emperor Akihito

The Emperors of Japan have been famous for their special interest in science, in particular biology. Emperor Akihito has strived over many years to advance the study taxonomy of gobioid fishes.

It was a particularly charming moment when Emperor of Japan, Akihito, who has studied the taxonomy and evolution of gobioid fishes, mentioned in his congratulatory address during the award ceremony that he has used the neighbor-joining method to construct phylogenetic trees during his studies of these fishes.

— Professor Masatoshi Nei, the 2002 International Prize for Biology Laureate

== Laureates ==
Source: Japan Society for the Promotion of Science

Year	Laureate	Nationality	Field
1985	E. J. H. Corner	United Kingdom	Taxonomy or Systematic Biology
1986	Peter H. Raven	United States	Systematic Biology and Taxonomy
1987	John B. Gurdon	United Kingdom	Developmental Biology
1988	Motoo Kimura	Japan	Population Biology
1989	Eric James Denton	United Kingdom	Marine Biology
1990	Masakazu Konishi	Japan	Behavioral Biology
1991	Marshall D. Hatch	Australia	Functional Botany
1992	Knut Schmidt-Nielsen	Norway United States	Comparative Physiology and Biochemistry
1993	Edward O. Wilson	United States	Ecology
1994	Ernst Mayr	Germany United States	Systematic Biology and Taxonomy
1995	Ian R. Gibbons	United Kingdom	Cell Biology
1996	Ryuzo Yanagimachi	Japan	Biology of Reproduction
1997	Elliot Martin Meyerowitz	United States	Botany
1998	Otto Thomas Solbrig	Argentina	Biology of Biodiversity
1999	Setsuro Ebashi	Japan	Animal Physiology
2000	Seymour Benzer	United States	Developmental Biology
2001	Harry B. Whittington	United Kingdom	Paleontology
2002	Masatoshi Nei	United States	Evolutionary Biology
2003	Shinya Inoué	United States	Cell Biology
2004	Thomas Cavalier-Smith	United Kingdom	Systematic Biology and Taxonomy
2005	Nam-Hai Chua	United Kingdom	Structural Biology in Fine Structure, Morphology and Morphogenesis
2006	Serge Daan	Netherlands	Chronobiology
2007	David Swenson Hogness	United States	Genetics
2008	David Tilman	United States	Ecology
2009	Winslow Briggs	United States	Botany
2010	Nancy A. Moran	United States	Biology of Symbiosis
2011	Eric H. Davidson	United States	Developmental Biology
2012	Joseph Altman	United States	Neurobiology
2013	Joseph Felsenstein	United States	Biology of Evolution
2014	Peter Crane	United Kingdom	Biology of Biodiversity
2015	Yoshinori Ohsumi	Japan	Cell Biology
2016	Stephen P. Hubbell	United States	Biology of Biodiversity
2017	Rita R. Colwell	United States	Marine Biology
2018	Andrew H. Knoll	United States	Earth and Planetary Sciences
2019	Naomi Pierce	United States	Biology of Insects
2020	Shinozaki Kazuo	Japan	Biology of Environmental Responses
2021	Timothy Douglas White	United States	Biology of Human Evolution
2022	Tsukamoto Katsumi	Japan	Biology of Fishes
2023	Richard M. Durbin	United Kingdom	Biology of Genomes

== See also ==
- Japan Society for the Promotion of Science
- List of biology awards
