= James Spudich =

American scientist and professor

- Born: 7 January 1942 (age 84); Benld, Illinois, U.S.
- Education: University of Illinois at Urbana-Champaign, Stanford University, MRC Laboratory of Molecular Biology
- Known for: Molecular motors
- Awards: E. B. Wilson Medal (2011); Albert Lasker Award (2012); Wiley Prize in Biomedical Science (2012)
- Scientific career
- Fields: Biochemistry, Biophysics
- Workplaces: Stanford University
- Doctoral advisor: Arthur Kornberg
- Other academic advisors: John Woodland Hastings, Hugh Huxley
- Doctoral students: Coleen T. Murphy

James A. Spudich (/ˈspʊdɪtʃ/) is an American scientist and professor. He is the Douglass M. and Nola Leishman Professor of Biochemistry and of Cardiovascular Disease at Stanford University and works on the molecular basis of muscle contraction. He was awarded the Albert Lasker Basic Medical Research Award in 2012 with Michael Sheetz and Ronald Vale. He is a Fellow of the American Academy of Arts and Sciences and a Member of the National Academy of Sciences.

== Biography ==
Spudich was born in Benld, Illinois of Croatian ancestry. He earned his B.S. in chemistry from University of Illinois at Urbana-Champaign, where he worked in John Woodland Hastings's lab on the topic of bioluminescence, and helped Hastings teach in the physiology course at the Marine Biological Laboratory at Woods Hole. He earned his Ph.D. in biochemistry from Stanford University under the guidance from Arthur Kornberg. He later did his postdoctoral research at Stanford University with Charles Yanofsky and at MRC in the Laboratory of Molecular Biology with Hugh Huxley.

His research is focused on studying molecular motors particularly myosin. With Huxley, he started working on an actin/myosin/ATP model for molecular motors, proposing that myosin would ratchet actin and exert a stroke. Spudich first attempted to create an in vitro setup with actin and myosin. However, he faced great difficulty aligning actin filaments. In 1982 he and Michael Sheetz started to work on the alga Nitella, which has long oriented actin fibers, and observed myosin coated beads moving along actin filaments. This provided strong clues about the molecular transport of intracellular cargo, later refined to observing a single step of a single myosin molecule. His research and its place in the overall development of the motility field has been described in a number of well-cited review articles.

He started at UCSF and then came to Stanford as a professor of Structural biology in 1977. In 1992 he switched to the Department of Biochemistry. In the late 1990s, he joined with Stanford physicist Steven Chu to create an interdisciplinary research program that combines engineering, physics, and biology — launching the Stanford University Bio-X Initiative and physically locates investigators from these distinct disciples together for extended periods. They pitched the concept to Stanford Provost Condoleezza Rice. From 1994–1998 he was the editor of the Annual Review of Cell and Developmental Biology.

In 1998 Spudich co-founded Cytokinetics Inc. in San Francisco, along with Ron Vale and James Sabry from UCSF and Larry Goldstein from UCSD. Spudich also co-founded MyoKardia in 2012 which was acquired by Bristol Myers Squibb in 2020 for $13.1 billion. In 2019, James Spudich, Annamma Spudich, Darshan Trivedi, Suman Nag and Kathleen Ruppel co-founded Kainomyx Inc. which is focused on treating neglected tropical diseases. He was the president of the American Society for Cell Biology in 1989.

== Personal ==
He met his wife Annamma ("Anna") when they were both at the Marine Biology Lab with Hastings. They have two daughters, and five grandchildren. Spudich's long-time recreational hobby is flying small planes.

== Awards ==
- Massry Prize 2013
- Lasker Award 2012
- Wiley Prize 2012
- E. B. Wilson Medal 2011
- Humboldt Prize 1991
