= Meritxell Huch =

Stem cell biologist

Meritxell Huch Ortega
- Born: 1978 (age 47–48); Barcelona
- Education: University of Barcelona
- Scientific career
- Workplaces: Max Planck Institute of Molecular Cell Biology and Genetics; University of Cambridge; Centre for Genomic Regulation; Hubrecht Institute
- Thesis: Estudi de l'eficàcia antitumoral d'adenovirus redirigits a receptors FGFR i valoració de la selectivitat dels virus AdCK7pLuc i AduPARpLuc en models de càncer de pancrees (2007)

Meritxell Huch (Barcelona, 1978) is a stem cell biologist and director at the Max Planck Institute of Molecular Cell Biology and Genetics. Her research considers tissue regeneration and the development of tissue-specific disease models for human organs. She was awarded a European Research Council Consolidator Grant in 2023.

== Early life and education ==
After college Huch decided she wanted to work in science because of a desire to understand how aspirin works. Huch was an undergraduate student at the University of Barcelona, where she studied pharmaceutical sciences. She remained there for her graduate studies, earning a Master in 2003 and doctorate in 2007. She completed her PhD research in the Centre for Genomic Regulation, where she worked alongside Cristina Fillat. After completing her doctoral research she spent a year as a postdoctoral fellow before moving to the Hubrecht Institute on a Marie Curie Fellowship. In Utrecht she worked in the laboratory of Hans Clevers, where she isolated the stem cells responsible for the turnover of the adult stomach.

== Research and career ==
Huch was appointed a Sir Henry Dale Research Fellow at the Gurdon Institute at the University of Cambridge. She held a joint position with The Wellcome Trust and the Department of Physiology. After five years in Cambridge, Huch joined the Max Planck Institute of Molecular Cell Biology and Genetics as one of the first members of the Lise Meitner Excellence Program. She was appointed to the board of directors in 2022.

Inflammation and tissue damage are associated with chronic liver disease and cancer. Her group have extensively developed human organoid models to study the molecular basis of adult tissue regeneration. Having identified stem cells responsible for the rapid turnover of the adult stomach, Huch showed that they could be maintained in culture. Next she moved on to liver cells, demonstrating the replicative potential of progenitor cells during regeneration and showing they are promising candidates for future therapeutic interventions in liver diseases. Her research has the potential to reduce the use of animals in scientific research.

== Select publication ==
- Barker N; Huch M; Kujala P; et al. (2010). "Lgr5(+ve) stem cells drive self-renewal in the stomach and build long-lived gastric units in vitro". Cell Stem Cell. 6 (1): 25–36. doi:10.1016/j.stem.2009.11.013. PMID 20085740. Wikidata Q29616198.
- Sylvia F Boj; Hwang, Chang-il; Baker, Lindsey; et al. (2014). "Organoid models of human and mouse ductal pancreatic cancer". Cell. 160 (1–2): 324–338. doi:10.1016/j.cell.2014.12.021. PMC 4334572. PMID 25557080. Wikidata Q34456438.
- Huch, Meritxell; Craig Dorrell; Sylvia F Boj; et al. (2013). "In vitro expansion of single Lgr5+ liver stem cells induced by Wnt-driven regeneration". Nature. 494 (7436): 247–250. doi:10.1038/nature11826. PMC 3634804. PMID 23354049. Wikidata Q36791239.

== Awards and honours ==
- 2016 The Hamdan Award for Medical Research Excellence Hamdan Awards
- 2017 The Women in Cell Biology Early Career Medal
- 2018 Dame Sheila Sherlock Prize
- 2018 Elected EMBO Young Investigator
- 2019 The BINDER Innovation Prize
- 2022 German Stem Cell Network Hilde Mangold Award
- 2023 European Research Council Consolidator Grant
- 2024 Otto Bayer Award
- 2025 Elected member in the German National Academy of Sciences Leopoldina
- 2026 Academia Europaea Sydney Brenner Medal
