= Johannes Buchner =

German biochemist

Johannes Buchner is a German biochemist and professor at the Technical University of Munich, Munich, Germany.

== Career ==
Buchner obtained his PhD at the university of Regensburg, Germany, working with Rainer Rudolph and Rainer Jaenicke. He performed his postdoctoral research in the lab of Ira Pastan at the National Cancer Institute of the National Institutes of Health in Bethesda, USA, before becoming assistant professor at the University of Regensburg and subsequently full professor and Chair of Biotechnology at the TUM.

== Research ==
Molecular chaperones are an essential class of proteins that aid other proteins to obtain their biologically active structure and inhibit off-pathway side reactions during protein maturation. Buchner's work focuses on understanding mechanisms of molecular chaperones in a quantitative and mechanistic manner. His work has contributed to our understanding of the chaperone cycle of the bacterial chaperone GroEL and now lays a particular emphasis on small heat shock proteins (sHsps), the Hsp90 chaperone machinery and the role of molecular chaperones in antibody folding. Buchner's work established sHsps as molecular chaperones and has significantly contributed to our understanding of their function and mode of activation. His work on antibody folding delivered important insight in the mechanisms of how antibodies fold and are scrutinized by the cellular chaperone machinery. A major focus of Johannes Buchner's lab is the Hsp90 chaperone machine. His work has provided a detailed mechanistic understanding of Hsp90 and its regulation by co-chaperones, establishing a functional chaperone cycle for Hsp90, which has become a major target in cancer therapy Several discoveries from the Buchner lab on chaperone-mediated protein folding have been successfully translated into novel applications in biotechnology.

== Memberships and awards ==
Buchner is a member of the Bavarian Academy of Sciences, the German Academy of Sciences and was from 2015 to 2016 president of the German Society for Biochemistry and Molecular Biology. Furthermore, he is a founding member of the Rainer Rudolph foundation. His work on protein folding and molecular chaperones has received several awards, among others the Hans Neurath Award of the Protein Society (2011), the Leopoldina Schleiden Medal (2015), the Albrecht-Kossel-Award (2016) and the Max Bergmann Medal (2017).
