= R. Anthony Hyman =

British historian of computing (1928–2011)

- Born: 1928; London, England
- Died: 2011 (aged 82–83)
- Education: Dartington Hall School
- Alma mater: Trinity College, Cambridge
- Occupation: Historian of computing
- Employer(s): English Electric LEO; University of Oxford
- Spouse(s): Laura Alice Boyd (1934–1999), daughter of the 6th Baron Kilmarnock
- Children: 3, including the biologist Anthony A. Hyman
- Writing career
- Years active: 1973–2007
- Notable work: Charles Babbage, Pioneer of the Computer (1982).

Robert Anthony Hyman (1928–2011) was a British historian of computing.

Anthony Hyman wrote especially on the early Victorian computer pioneer, Charles Babbage (1791–1871). He liaised with the London Science Museum, the Royal Society, the Crawford Library, the Oxford Museum of the History of Science, the Cambridge University Library, the Edinburgh Royal Observatory for source material.

Hyman was born in 1928 in London. He studied at Dartington Hall and then Trinity College, Cambridge. He worked on transistors in the early 1950s, became a polymer scientist, and then worked as a computer researcher for English Electric LEO, before becoming "a free-lance computer consultant and historian of science", and the Alastair Horne Modern History Fellow at the University of Oxford. In 1962, Hyman married Hon. Laura Alice Boyd (1934–1999), daughter of the 6th Baron Kilmarnock. They had three children, including noted biologist Anthony A. Hyman. Hyman died in 2011.

== Selected publications ==
Hyman published the following books:

- Hyman, Anthony (1973). The Computer in Design. Littlehampton Book Services. ISBN 978-0289702680.
- —— (1978). Computing: A Dictionary of Terms, Concepts and Ideas. Arrow Books. ISBN 0099123207.
- —— (1980). The Coming of the Chip. New English Library. ISBN 978-0450049286.
- Hyman, Anthony, ed. (1989). Science and Reform: Selected works of Charles Babbage. Cambridge University Press. ISBN 978-0521343114.
- Hyman, Anthony (1992) [1982]. Charles Babbage: Pioneer of the Computer. Princeton University Press. ISBN 978-0-691-08303-2.
- Hyman, R. Anthony; Mack, Gerhard; Pallasmaa, Juhani, eds. (2002). Gentle Bridges: Architecture, Art and Science. Birkhäuser. ISBN 9783764367503.
- Hyman, Anthony (2007). The Selfseeker. Teignvalley Press. ISBN 978-0955538704.
