= Charles Babbage: Pioneer of the Computer =

1982 biographical book about Charles Babbage

- Author: Anthony Hyman
- Language: English
- Subject: Charles Babbage
- Genre: Biography
- Publisher: Oxford University Press, Princeton University Press
- Publication date: 1982/1985
- Publication place: United Kingdom & United States
- Media type: Hardback & softback
- Pages: 304
- ISBN: 978-0-198-58170-3 (also ISBN 978-0-691-08303-2 & ISBN 978-0-691-02377-9)
- OCLC: 1148219148
- LC Class: 81-48078
- Website: Archive.org

Charles Babbage: Pioneer of the Computer is a biographical book about the Victorian computer pioneer Charles Babbage (1791–1871). The book was written by Anthony Hyman (1928–2011), a British historian of computing. The book was published by Oxford University Press in 1982 (hardcover) and Princeton University Press in 1982 and 1985 (hardcover and paperback). The book is available online from Archive.org.

== Reviews ==
The book has been reviewed in the following journals and magazines:

- The American Mathematical Monthly
- Business History
- The International Journal of Electrical Engineering & Education
- Isis
- Journal of the Royal Statistical Society, Series A
- Library Journal
- London Review of Books
- Mathematical Reviews
- Mathematics of Computation
- Science
- SIAM Review
- Technology and Culture
