= Ari Helenius =

Finnish emeritus professor (born 1944)

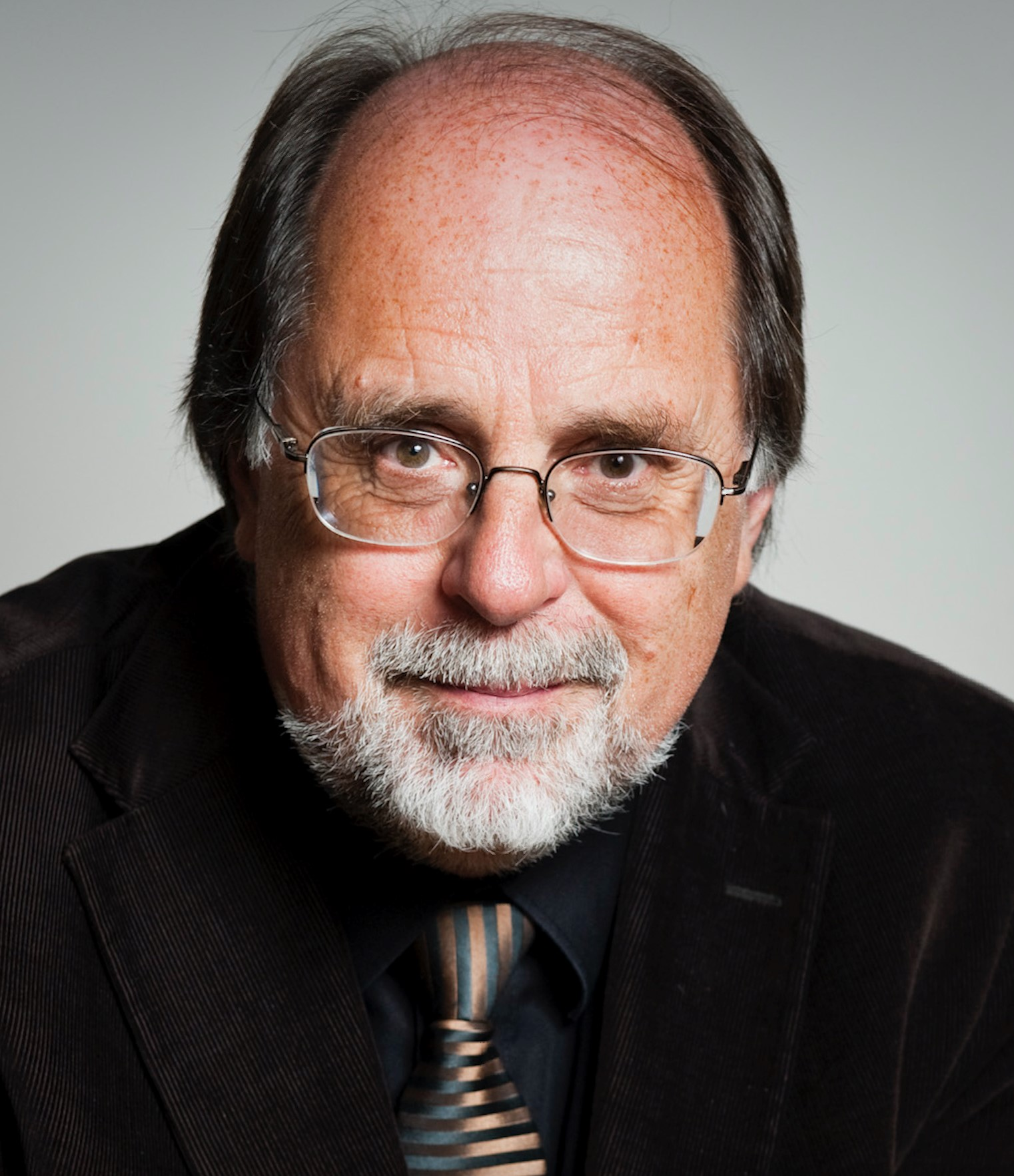
Ari Helenius (ca. 2010)

Ari Helenius (born 3 September 1944) is a Finnish emeritus professor of biochemistry who is known for his research in virology.

== Personal life ==
Helenius was born 3 September 1944 in Oulu, Finland.

== Career ==
He did his PhD with Kai Simons at the University of Helsinki in 1973. From 1975 until 1981 he worked as a staff scientist at the newly created European Molecular Biology Laboratory. From 1981 to 1997, he was a professor at Yale University, where he was chair of the department of cell biology from 1992 to 1997. In 1997, he joined the ETH Zurich as a founding member of the Institute of Biochemistry.

His research has earned him awards for the characterization of how viruses enter cells, and methods of protein folding and assembly. In 1999, he was appointed a member of the European Molecular Biology Organization (EMBO).

=== Awards ===
- 1973 Komppa Prize for the best doctoral thesis in chemistry in Finland
- 1991 and 1992 Humboldt Research Award
- 1992 Lamb Professorship of Molecular Pathogenesis at the Vanderbilt University
- 1992 NICHD Lectureship in Cell Biology des National Institute of Child Health and Human Development (NICHD), USA
- 1993 Honorary Professor of Carol Davila University of Medicine and Pharmacy, Bucharest
- 1995 AI Virtanen Prize in Biochemistry
- 1997 Spinoza Visiting Professorship at the University of Amsterdam
- 2001 Elected member of the National Academy of Sciences Leopoldina
- 2002 Member of the Academia Europaea
- 2003 Schleiden Medal of the Leopoldina
- 2003 Foreign Member of the Finnish Academy of Sciences
- 2003 Ernst Jung Prize for Medicine, together with Reinhard G. Lührmann (Max Planck Institute for Biophysical Chemistry, Göttingen)
- 2007 Order of the White Rose of Finland from the Finnish government
- 2007 Marcel Benoist Prize
- 2008 Van Deenen Medal for leading research on biomembranes
- 2009 Elected Foreign Associate of the National Academy of Sciences
- 2010 Otto Warburg Medal from the Society for Biochemistry and Molecular Biology
- 2010 Elected fellow of the American Academy of Microbiology
- 2010 Bijvoet Medal of the Bijvoet Center for Biomolecular Research at Utrecht University
- 2011 Heinrich Pette Lecture of the Heinrich Pette Institute
- 2012 Keith R. Porter Lecture
- 2016 Loeffler-Frosch Medal of the Society of Virology
