= Anthony A. Hyman =

British biologist

Anthony Hyman FRS MAE
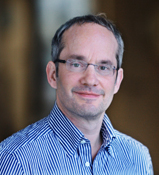
- Born: Anthony Arie Hyman; 27 May 1962 (age 64); Haifa, Israel
- Education: William Ellis School
- Alma mater: University College London (BSc); University of Cambridge (PhD)
- Spouse: Suzanne Eaton
- Children: 2
- Awards: EMBO Member (2000); EMBO Gold Medal (2003); Leibniz Prize (2011); Schleiden Medal (2017); Breakthrough Prize in Life Sciences (2023)
- Scientific career
- Fields: Molecular Cell Biology
- Workplaces: European Molecular Biology Laboratory; University of California, San Francisco; Max Planck Institute of Molecular Cell Biology and Genetics
- Thesis: Establishment of division axes in the early embryonic divisions of Caenorhabditis Elegans (1987)
- Website: hymanlab.org

Anthony Arie Hyman (born 27 May 1962 in Haifa) FRS MAE is a British scientist, Director General of the European Molecular Biology Laboratory (EMBL), and director at the Max Planck Institute of Molecular Cell Biology and Genetics.

== Early life and education ==
Hyman was born in 1962, the eldest of three children of R. Anthony Hyman, a historian of computing, and Hon. Laura Alice Boyd, daughter of the 6th Baron Kilmarnock. He was educated at William Ellis School and St Marylebone Grammar School, University College London and the University of Cambridge, where he was awarded a PhD in 1987.

== Career and research ==
Hyman has focused his career on examining microtubules and how these structures of the cytoskeleton control: cell division, mitotic spindle position, and cell polarity. Hyman's research has identified how microtubules are made into cellular structures and how they are broken down.

While at King's College, Cambridge, Hyman worked under the supervision of John White and was a key researcher in Sydney Brenner's Caenorhabditis elegans group. Using microscopy and microsurgery, he examined the placement of cell axes during early cell division of C.elegans embryos. Hyman presented new findings about mechanisms of rotation by cutting microtubules with a laser beam. Hyman demonstrated that pulling forces acting from the posterior cortex on microtubules drives spindle rotation.

At the University of California, San Francisco, Hyman investigated the interaction between chromosomes and microtubules that create the mitotic forces that separate chromosomes in the lab of Tim Mitchison. He also created a number of tools that are used today:

- atypical hydrolysable GTP analog GMPCPP
- various fluorescent tubulin derivatives
- assays for motors and microtubule polarity

While at the European Molecular Biology Laboratory (EMBL) Hyman along with Rebecca Heald and Eric Karsenti combined their work to create an impact on the current understanding of how the meiotic spindle self assembles. Hyman created his first independent group at EMBL that discovered that the important factors in Xenopus egg extracts were the stabilizing protein, XMAP215 and the destabilizing protein, XKCM1.

In 1999, Hyman became one of the four founding directors of Max Planck Institute of Molecular Cell Biology and Genetics and was the Managing Director for the institute from 2010–2013. During his tenure at the MPI-CBG, Hyman and his lab members have focused on:

- Cytoplasmic organization and how cells form non-membrane bound compartments
- Size and scaling of the spindle, centrosomes, and other organelles
- Spatial control of the microtubule cytoskeleton
- Positioning of the spindle

Hyman has worked on creating parts lists for cell division among human cells as part of the EU funded projects Mitocheck and MitoSys.

Hyman is currently studying the mechanisms by which cells compartmentalize their biochemistry. Of his many contributions to the field of molecular biology, he is best known for two discoveries in particular: In 2000, his team pioneered the use of RNA interference to define the "parts lists" for different cytoplasmic processes. And in 2009, he, together with Cliff Brangwynne and Frank Julicher, made a fundamental breakthrough by being the first to observe that compartments in cells can form by phase separation. Aberrant phase transitions within liquid-like compartments may underlie amyotrophic lateral sclerosis (ALS) and other neurodegenerative and age-related diseases. Hyman's current work focuses on the physical-chemical basis by which intrinsically disordered proteins phase separate. Using this knowledge, he is studying the roles of phase separation in physiology and disease.

Hyman served as a member of the Strategic Advisory Board on Science at the Wellcome Trust.

In November 2025, he was selected as the next Director General of EMBL, and took up this position at the end of March 2026.

=== Awards and honours ===
Anthony Hyman is honorary professor at the Faculty of Biology at TU Dresden. In 2011, Hyman was awarded the Gottfried Wilhelm Leibniz Prize, Germany's most prestigious research award, for his work on microtubules and cell division. Hyman was elected a Member of the European Molecular Biology Organization (EMBO) in 2000 and was awarded its Gold Medal in 2003. He was elected a Fellow of the Royal Society (FRS) in 2007. The Academia Europaea elected Hyman as a member in 2014 and in 2017, he received the Schleiden Medal from the German National Academy of Sciences Leopoldina. In 2020, he was given the NOMIS Distinguished Scientist Award by the NOMIS Foundation. Hyman was elected Member of the National Academy of Sciences in April 2020. In February 2021, Hyman was awarded the 2021 Wiley Prize in Biomedical Sciences for his work on biomolecular condensates. He received the 2021 HFSP Nakasone Award together with Clifford Brangwynne and he was elected a member of the German National Academy of Sciences Leopoldina in 2021. In 2022, Hyman received the Körber European Science Prize 2022. For 2023 he was awarded the Breakthrough Prize in Life Sciences for discovering a fundamental mechanism of cellular organization mediated by phase separation of proteins and RNA into membraneless liquid droplets.

== Personal life ==
Hyman was married to American scientist Suzanne Eaton (1959–2019); the couple had two children.
