= Kathryn Calame =

Kathryn Lee Calame is a professor emeritus of microbiology and immunology at Columbia University College of Physicians and Surgeons. She was formerly the director of their Integrated Program in Cellular, Molecular, and Biophysical Studies. She was involved in the discovery and characterization of B lymphocyte-induced maturation protein (Blimp-1).

== Education ==
In 1962, Calame received a BS in chemistry from the University of Missouri. She received her master's and doctoral degrees from George Washington University.

== Career ==
In 1980, she joined the faculty at the UCLA School of Medicine. She moved to the Department of Microbiology and of Biochemistry and Molecular Biophysics at the Columbia University College of Physicians and Surgeons in 1988.

She was a member of the scientific review board for the Howard Hughes Medical Institute. She is on the board of the Leukemia & Lymphoma Society.

== Honors ==
- 1993 Elected Fellow of the American Association for the Advancement of Science
- 2003 Elected Fellow of the American Academy of Arts and Sciences
- 2007 Elected to the Institute of Medicine

Columbia University instituted the annual Calame Lecture in Immunology in 2009. In 2011, she was awarded an honorary degree from the University of Missouri.

== Personal life ==
Calame is married to Byron Calame, who retired as deputy managing editor of the Wall Street Journal. They have two children.
