= Setsuro Ebashi =

- 江橋 節郎
- Born: 31 August 1922; Tokyo, Japan
- Died: 17 July 2006 (aged 83); Okazaki, Aichi, Japan
- Education: University of Tokyo
- Known for: Discovery of troponin Diagnosis of muscular dystrophy
- Awards: Imperial Prize (1972); Order of Culture (1975); International Prize for Biology (1999)
- Scientific career
- Fields: Physiology
- Workplaces: National Institute for Physiological Sciences; University of Tokyo; Rockefeller University

Setsuro Ebashi MJA ForMemRS (江橋 節郎, Ebashi Setsurō; 31 August 1922 Tokyo – 17 July 2006 Okazaki) was a prominent Japanese physiologist who uncovered the regulatory role of calcium in cells. He is famous for the discovery of troponin in 1965, which is integral to muscle contraction, as well as for the contribution of diagnosis of muscular dystrophy.

== Life ==
Ebashi was born in Tokyo, and received his medical degree in 1944 and Ph.D. in 1954 from the University of Tokyo. He was Guest Investigator of the Rockefeller Institute in New York City from January to December 1959, where he studied with Fritz Lipmann.

Ebashi was Professor and Chair of Pharmacology at the Faculty of Medicine, University of Tokyo from May 1959 until March 1983, as well as Professor and Chair of Biophysics at the School of Science from May 1971 to March 1983. He trained many graduate students and postdoctorals who later became leading figures in basic medical sciences in Japan, including Tomoh Masaki who discovered Endothelin in 1988.

After retiring from the University of Tokyo and becoming Professor Emeritus, Ebashi was offered a professorship in the National Institute for Physiological Sciences in Okazaki. He became Director-General of National Institute for Physiological Sciences in April 1985, and President of Okazaki National Institutes including National Institute for Physiological Sciences in March 1991.

== Recognition ==
Ebashi was awarded several honors including, the 1968 Asahi Prize, the 1972 Imperial Prize of the Japan Academy, the 1999 International Prize for Biology, the Order of the Sacred Treasure, and an Order of Culture. He was elected as a foreign member of the Royal Society (ForMemRS) in 1977 and a member of the Japan Academy (MJA) in 1978.

== Setsuro Ebashi Award ==
Since 2007 the Japanese Pharmacological Society has awarded the Setsuro Ebashi Award to researchers who made a considerable achievement in the field of pharmacology in honor of Setsuro Ebashi who contributed on a global scale to the field of biomedical research. Shinya Yamanaka, the 2008 Setsuro Ebashi Award winner, received the Nobel Prize in Physiology or Medicine in 2012.

== Publications ==
- Hiroshi Yoshida, Yashiro Hagihara, Setsuro Ebashi (ed) Advances in pharmacology and therapeutics II Pergamon, 1982, ISBN 978-0-08-028022-6
- Novel developments on genetic recombination: dna double-strand break and dna end-joining, Japan Scientific Soc. Press, 2004
- Setsuro Ebashi, E. Ozawa (ed) Muscular Dystrophy: Biomedical Aspects, Springer Verlag, 1983, ISBN 978-0-387-12342-4
- Protein array: an alternative biomolecular system Japan Scientific Soc. Press, 1997
- Muscle elastic proteins, Japan Scientific Soc. Press, 1996
