= Kai Simons =

Finnish physician and professor of biochemistry

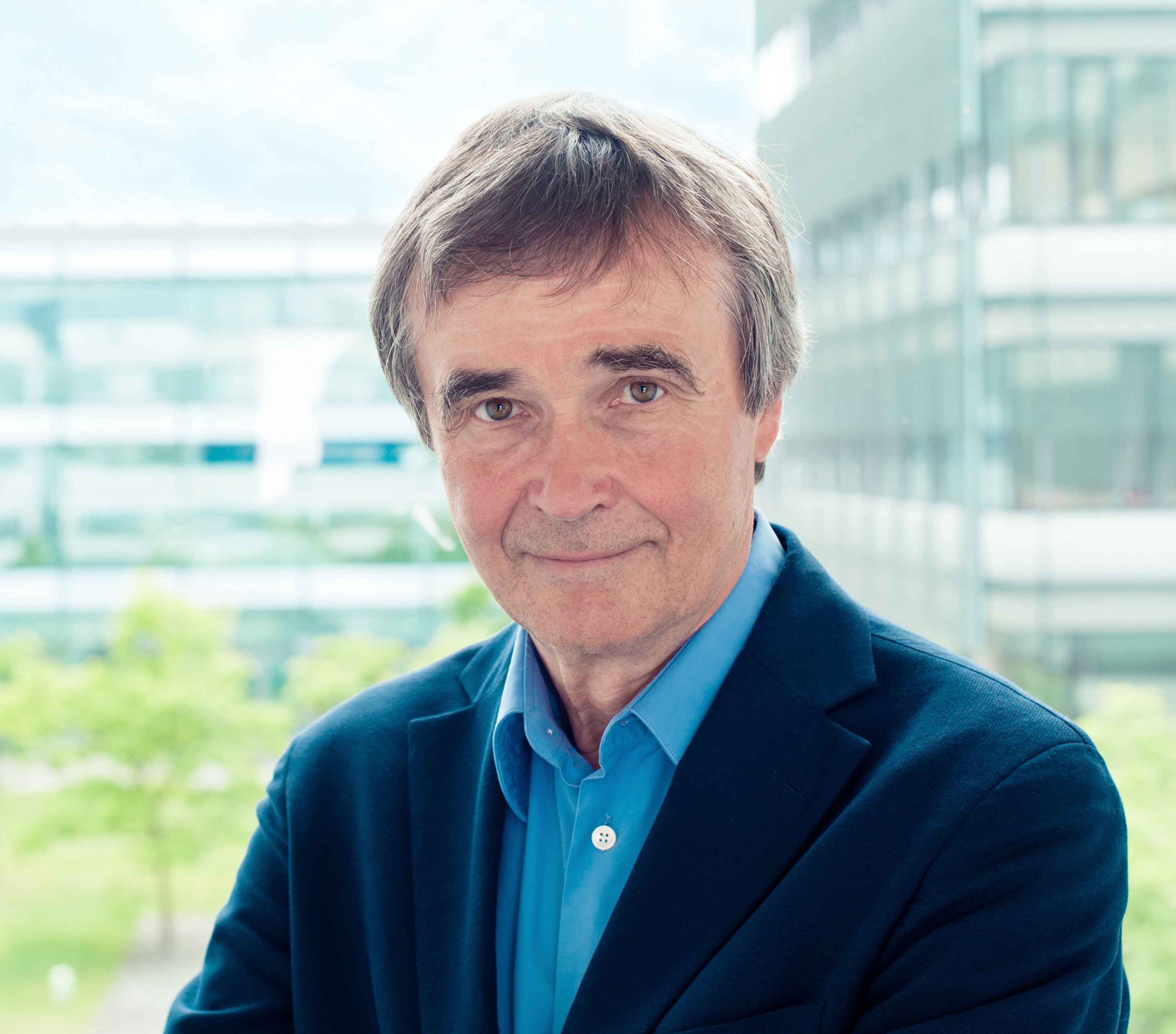
- Born: 24 May 1938 (age 88); Helsinki, Finland
- Education: University of Helsinki (MD), Rockefeller University (postdoctoral fellowship)
- Known for: lipid rafts, trans-Golgi network
- Spouse: Carola Simons
- Children: 3; Mikael, Katja, Matias
- Scientific career
- Fields: biochemistry, cell biology
- Workplaces: Rockefeller University, University of Helsinki, EMBL, MPI-CBG, Lipotype GmbH
- Website: http://www.lipotype.com

Kai Simons (born 24 May 1938) is a Finnish professor of biochemistry and cell biology and physician, living and working in Germany. He introduced the concept of lipid rafts, and coined the term trans-Golgi network. He is the co-founder and co-organizer of the European Molecular Biology Laboratory and European Molecular Biology Organization, and initiated the foundation of Max Planck Institute of Molecular Cell Biology and Genetics.

== Early life and education ==
Kai Simons is the son of a physics professor. His father convinced him to study medicine, though he originally wanted to study physics. While studying at the University of Helsinki, Simons spent a summer internship in the Stockholm laboratory of Bengt Samuelsson There, he studied mechanisms of vitamin B12 absorption. He worked with other students to organize a campaign to fight taeniasis, a disease common in eastern Finland where eating raw fish is popular.

After completing his MD in 1964, he began a postdoctoral fellowship at Rockefeller University in New York City, where he worked between 1966 and 1967 on blood serum protein polymorphism.

== Career ==
Simons returned to Helsinki in 1967, where he began working as a junior investigator for the Finnish Medical Research Council at the University of Helsinki. He became a group leader in 1972 and was a biochemistry professor in 1971–79 at the medical faculty of this university At first, he continued his work on serum proteins. Next, together with Leevi Kääriäinen and Ossi Renkonen, he started a research team – later joined by Ari Helenius, his first PhD student and later a post doctoral researcher who became Simons' brother-in-law. After a one-month stay in MRC Laboratory for Molecular Biology in Cambridge, the group started investigating a Semliki Forest virus, introduced to Simons by Kääriäinen.

In 1975 Simons went to Heidelberg, Germany, as one of the EMBL group leaders. Together with Ari Helenius he helped to develop EMBL, headed at this time by John Kendrew. In years 1982–1998 Simons was a coordinator of the Cell Biology Program there. During this time he for the first time he introduced the concept of lipid rafts, as well as coined the term trans-Golgi network and proposed its role in protein and lipid sorting.

In 1999 he took part in setting up ELSO (later incorporated into EMBO), which later he presided over.

He was one of the initiators of establishing and building Max Planck Institute of Molecular Cell Biology and Genetics in Dresden (Germany), where he moved. Formally from 1998 (beginning of MPI-CBG construction) and from 2000 he was one of five institute's directors and also a group leader there. He was a director (1998–2006) and a group leader (until 2012). Since 2006 he is a "director emeritus".

He is the co-founder and co-owner of Lipotype GmbH.

In 2012 he started-up a biotech company Lipotype GmbH, where he is a CEO.

== Research ==
Early in his career, Simons pursued research in the field of medical biochemistry. Both his master's thesis and postgraduate research focused on vitamin B12 absorption. After returning from his post-doc scholarship he continued research on vitamin B12 as well as on blood plasma proteins, but soon started investigating Semliki Forest virus, focusing on its membrane and its lipid composition and their role in the virus budding and its transport, as the model for lipid and protein secretion. During this period, Simons also investigated the application of detergents in biochemistry with a special attention to their role in biological membrane research.

The virus lifecycle and how it uses components of vesicular pathways while shuttling to the cell surface, turned Simons' attention toward vesicular transport pathways and cell polarization. Applying epithelial model cells – MDCK (Madin-Darby canine kidney), he investigated lipid transport, protein sorting and their role in polarizing cells.

In these studies, he described the role of the trans-Golgi network (TGN) in protein and lipid sorting according to their destination. In his works from 1988, together with Gerit van Meer, Simons proposed the existence of lipid microdomains in cell membranes for the first time. Such microdomains differ in their composition from the surrounding membrane and have special functions. Simons coined the term 'lipid rafts' to describe these microdomains. This concept was developed over the years to be presented more fully in 1997 in Nature journal by Simons and Ikonen. This paper became one of the most frequently cited works in the field of membrane research. Other Simons' paper, on role of lipid rafts in the signal transduction is second highest cited work and Simons is fourth highest cited scientist in the field of signal transduction. Kai Simons was also recognized by ISI Web of Knowledge, as one of the most cited scientist ever.

In subsequent years, Simons continued to work on the role of lipid rafts, and more generally lipids, in cell polarization and protein sorting. He was interested also in the role of lipids and protein sorting in neurodegenerative diseases, especially in Alzheimer's disease.

His scientific record includes more than 350 scientific articles, mostly in the field of biochemistry, molecular organization of the cell, and biochemistry and physiology of a cell membrane.

Considering his work from years 1996–2007 tracked until May 2009, Simons was 12th in the list of the most frequently cited scientists in the field cell biology with 90 articles and 16,299 citations.

== Honours and awards ==
Kai Simons honours and awards include:

- 1975 Federation of European Biochemical Society Anniversary Prize
- 1984 Honorary Professor, University of Heidelberg, Germany
- 1989 Lamport Visiting Professor (Columbia, New York)
- 1990 Histochemical Society Lecture
- 1990 Keith R. Porter Lecture, American Society of Cell Biology
- 1991 Anders Jahre Prize for Medical Research
- 1991 NICHD Lectureship in Cell Biology
- 1993 Carl Zeiss Lecture, German Society for Cell Biology
- 1994 Harvey Society Lecture
- 1996 Dunham Lecturer, Harvard University
- 1996 Foreign Member of the American Academy of Arts and Sciences
- 1997 Academia Europaea
- 1997 Adam Neville Lecture, University of Dundee, UK
- 1997 Foreign Member of the National Academy of Sciences, USA
- 1997 Runeberg Prize, Finland
- 1998 Academy of Sciences Leopoldina
- 1998 Choh Hao Li Memorial Lecture in Biochemical Endocrinology, University of California, Berkeley
- 1999 Doctor Honoris Causa, University of Oulu, Finland
- 2000 President of the European Life Scientist Organisation
- 2001 Honorary member of the German Society for Cell Biology
- 2001 ISI Highly cited researcher
- 2001 Schleiden Medal of Academy Leopoldina
- 2002 Hoppe-Seyler Lecture, Society of Biology and Molecular Biology Germany
- 2003 Albert Wander Prize, University of Bern, Switzerland
- 2003 Matti Äyräpää Prize, Finland
- 2003 Doctor Honoris Causa, University of Leuven, Belgium
- 2003 Honorary Professor at TU Dresden
- 2003 Nessim-Habif World Prize, University of Geneva, Switzerland
- 2004 Virchow Lecture and Medal, University of Würzburg, Germany
- 2005 Foundation Day Lecture, Centre for Cellular and Molecular Biology, Hyderabad, India
- 2005 van Deenen Medal, Utrecht, The Netherlands
- 2006 A.I. Virtanen Medal, Finland
- 2006 Honorary member of the Societas Biochemica, Biophysica et Microbiologica Fenniae
- 2007 Order of Merit of the Free State of Saxony
- 2010 Doctor honoris causa, University of Kuopio, Finland
- 2011 Doctor honoris causa, University of Geneva, Switzerland
- 2016 Robert Koch Medal
- 2025 Cothenius Medal

Kai Simons was and is also a member of numerous societies, committees and organisations, as well as an editor for several scientific journals.

== Personal life ==
He is married to Carola Simons and a father of three.
