= Tom Misteli =

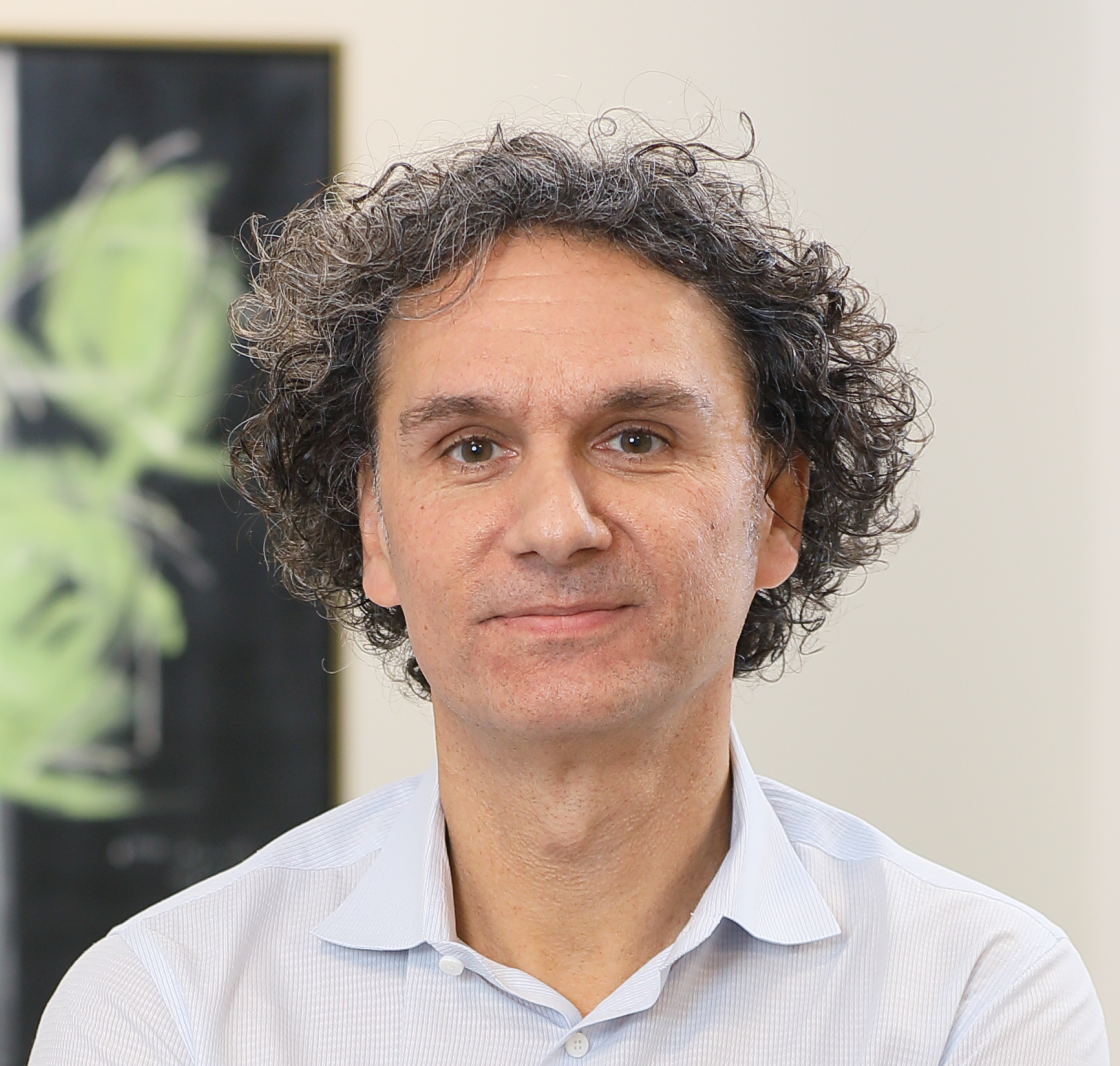

Tom Misteli is a Swiss-born (Solothurn) cell biologist who has pioneered the field of genome cell biology. From 2016-2024 he was the Director of the Center for Cancer Research at the National Cancer Institute, NIH.

Misteli is best known for his work on elucidation of how genomes function in living cells. While a post-doc at the Cold Spring Harbor Laboratory, New York, United States, he developed methods to visualize proteins in the nucleus of living mammalian cells allowing for the first time to study gene expression in intact cells. His more recent work focuses on the role of genome organization and nuclear architecture on differentiation and disease. His cell biological elucidation of the mechanisms involved in the pre-mature aging disease Hutchinson–Gilford progeria syndrome have revealed novel mechanisms of human aging.

He is an NIH Distinguished Investigator at the National Cancer Institute, NIH, Bethesda, MD, United States. He was the Editor-in-Chief of The Journal of Cell Biology (2009-2015) and of Current Opinion in Cell Biology. He serves on the editorial boards of Science, Cell and PLOS Biology. He co-authored the influential report by the US National Academy of Sciences "Toward Precision Medicine".

For his work he has won numerous awards including the Flemming Award, The Gold Medal of the Charles University, The Beerman Award,the Feulgen Prize and the E.B. Wilson Award. He is an elected Fellow of the American Society for Cell Biology.
