= Max Planck Institute of Molecular Cell Biology and Genetics =

German research institute

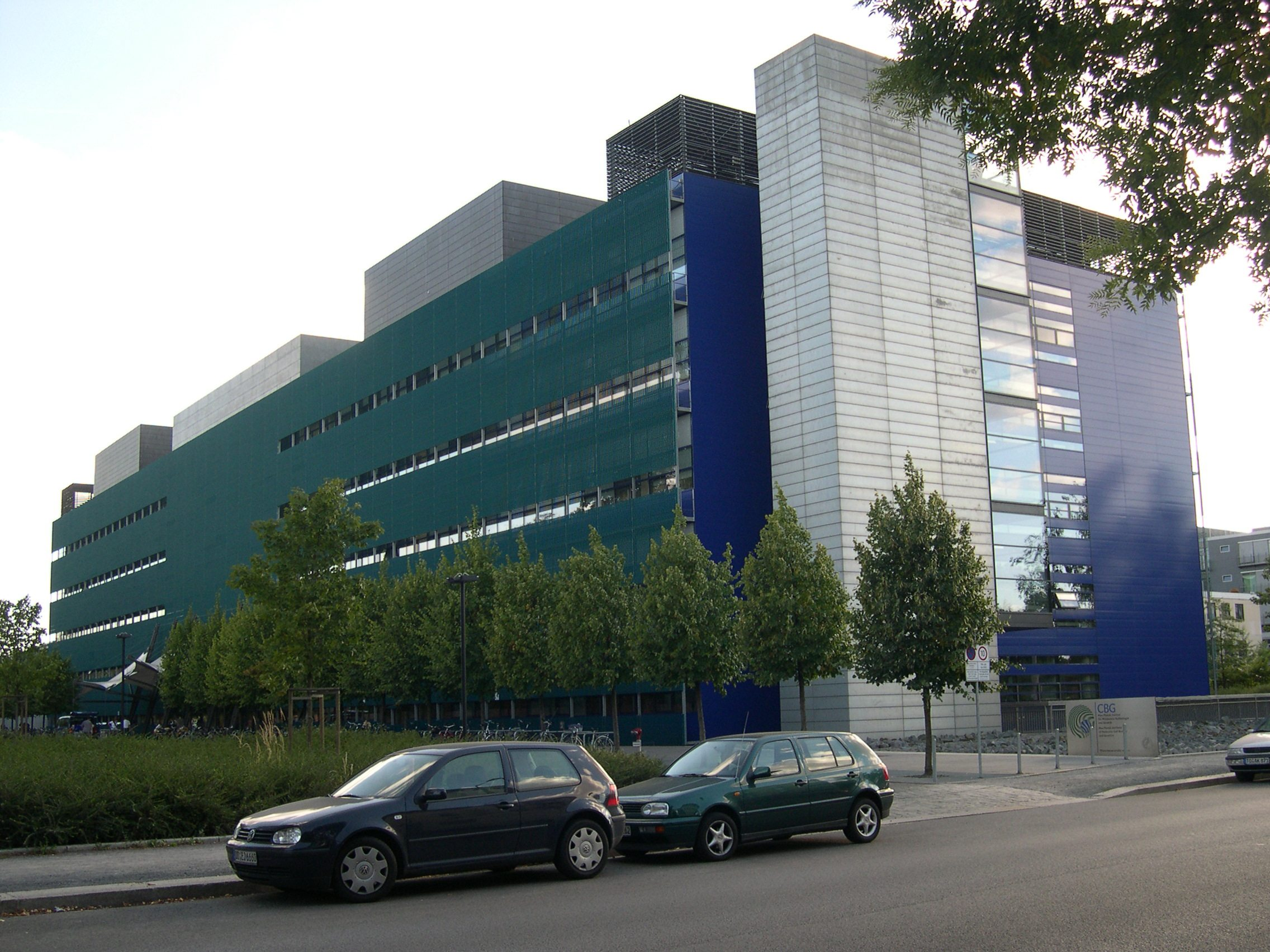
- Coordinates: 51°3′31″N 13°47′5″E
- Website: https://www.mpi-cbg.de

The Max Planck Institute of Molecular Cell Biology and Genetics (MPI-CBG) is a biology research institute located in Dresden, Germany. It was founded in 1998 and was fully operational in 2001. Research groups in the institute work in molecular biology, cell biology, developmental biology, biophysics, systems biology, and mathematics supported by various facilities.

== Research ==
The research theme of research at MPI-CBG lies in the fundamental scientific questions pertaining to organisation of biology at various scales: How do biomolecules organize in a functioning cell? How do cells form tissues? and How do tissues form organisms? The research in the institute encompasses many topics from molecular, cellular, and developmental biology as well as from biophysics. An incomplete list of individual topics follows: phase separation, neural development, cell division, lipid rafts, endocytosis, embryogenesis, regeneration, tissue and organoid development.

== Organisation ==
The MPI-CBG is headed by six tenured directors or group leaders – Anne Grapin-Botton (France) as managing director, Anthony Hyman (UK), Marino Zerial (Italy), Stephan Grill (Germany), Heather Harrington (USA), and Meritxell Huch (Spain). Directors emeritus are: Eugene Myers (USA), Kai Simons (Finland), Elisabeth Knust (Germany), Wieland Huttner. Together with the directors' groups, 23 independent research groups led by untenured principal investigators and about 21 facilities make up the work force of the institute. In total, the institute employs around 550 people of whom about half are not German. The flat organisation and the absence of department divisions fosters direct communication and a slim administration.

== Networking ==
The MPI-CBG is located in a hub of biomedical research institutes including research centers of the Technische Universität Dresden (TUD) such as, the Center for Regenerative Therapies (CRTD), the B CUBE - Center for Molecular Bioengineering as well as the University Hospital Carl Gustav Carus Dresden, the Medical Theoretical Centre (MTZ) and the BioInnovationsZentrum (BIOZ). The MPI-CBG has collaborations with its neighbouring research institutes and with other centres in the city like the Max Planck Institute for the Physics of Complex Systems (MPI-PKS). Together with the MPI-PKS and the TUD, the MPI-CBG founded the Center for Systems Biology Dresden (CSBD). This center develops theoretical and computational approaches to biological systems across different scales, from molecules to cells and from cells to tissues. The MPI-CBG is also part of DRESDEN-concept, a research alliance of the TUD together with the four major research institutions – Max Planck, Helmholtz, Fraunhofer, and Leibniz – and the research-active museums in Dresden. It also collaborates with institutions abroad. In addition, it operates an international PhD program together with the aforementioned neighbours.
