= Michael Sheetz =

American biochemist (1946–2025)

Michael Patrick Sheetz (12 November 1946 – 30 January 2025) was a cell biologist, a pioneer of mechanobiology and biomechanics, and a key contributor to the discovery of kinesin. He served as the Robert A. Welch Distinguished University Chair in Chemistry at the University of Texas Medical Branch, Galveston, the department of biochemistry and molecular biology. He was the William R. Kenan, Jr. Professor Emeritus of Cell Biology at Columbia University, former distinguished professor and the founding director of the Mechanobiology Institute at the National University of Singapore, and former professor at Washington University in St. Louis and chairman at Duke University.

In 1968, Sheetz earned a bachelor's degree at Albion College, and in 1972 received his Ph.D. from the California Institute of Technology.

Sheetz who had been born in Hershey, Pennsylvania, died on 30 January 2025, at the age of 78, in Galveston, Texas.

== Awards ==
- 2012 Wiley Prize in Biomedical Sciences
- 2012 Albert Lasker Award for Basic Medical Research
- 2013 Massry Prize
- 2014 Keith R. Porter Lecture to American Society for Cell Biology
