= StarTram =

Projectile launcher that uses magnetic levitation on megastructures

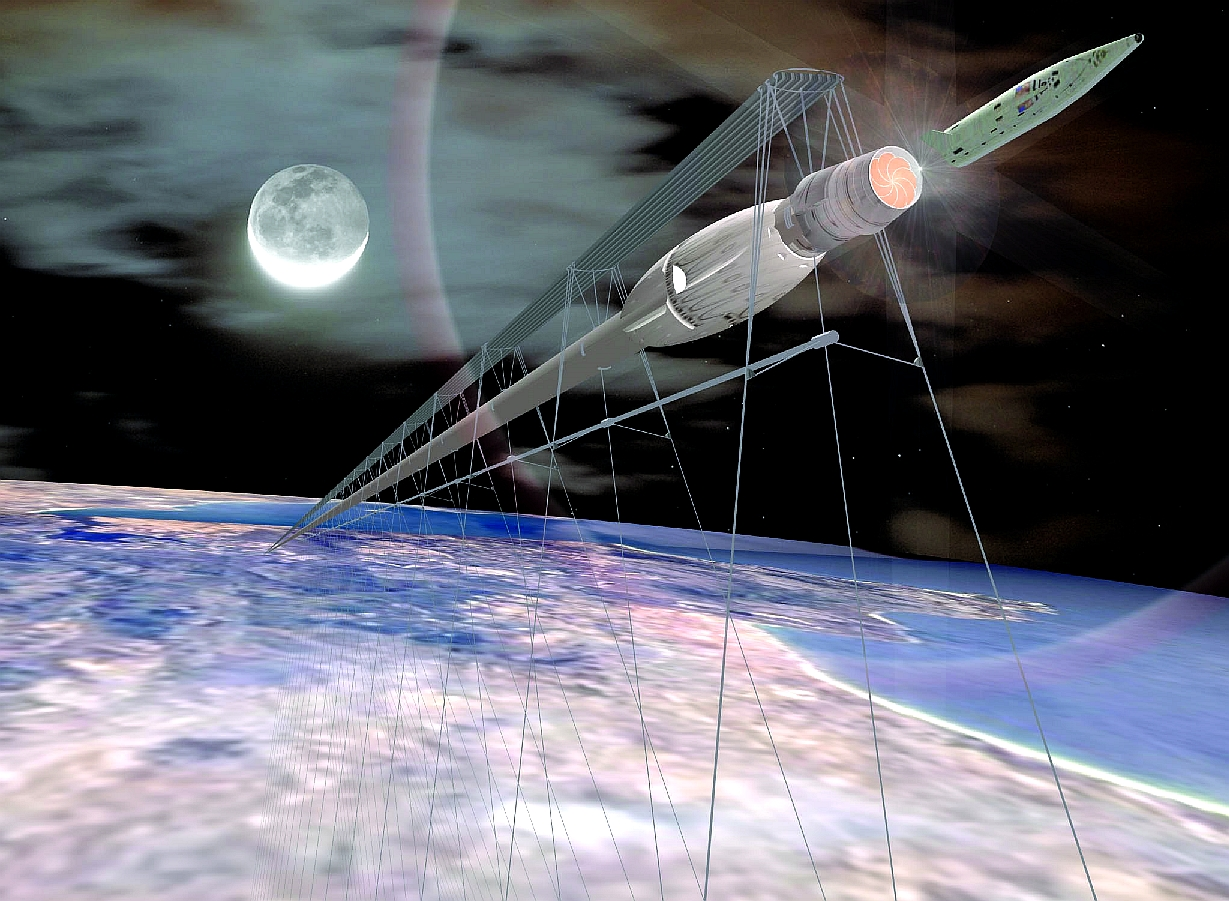
StarTram launching a rocket

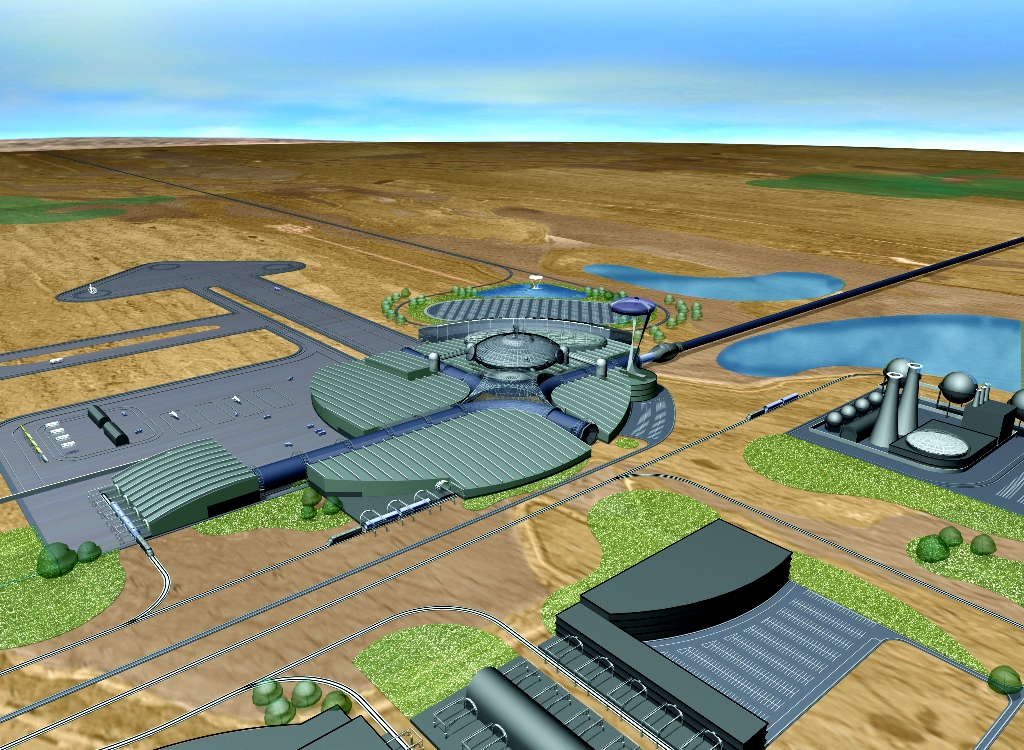
Hypothetical StarTram spaceport. The launch tube stretches into the distance to the east on the right (eventually curving up many kilometers away), next to the power plant which charges the SMES. RLVs return to land on the runway.

StarTram is a proposed space launch system propelled by maglev technology. The initial Generation 1 facility is proposed to launch cargo only from a mountain peak at an altitude of 3 to 7 kilometres (9,800 to 23,000 ft) using an evacuated tube remaining at local surface level. Annual orbital lift was estimated at approximately 150,000 tons. More advanced technology is required for a Generation 2 system for passengers, with a longer track instead gradually curving up at its end to the thinner air at 22 kilometres (72,000 ft) altitude, supported by magnetic levitation, reducing g-forces when each capsule transitions from the vacuum tube to the atmosphere. A SPESIF 2010 presentation stated that Generation 1 could be completed by the year 2020 or later if funding began in 2010, and Generation 2 by 2030 or later.

== History ==
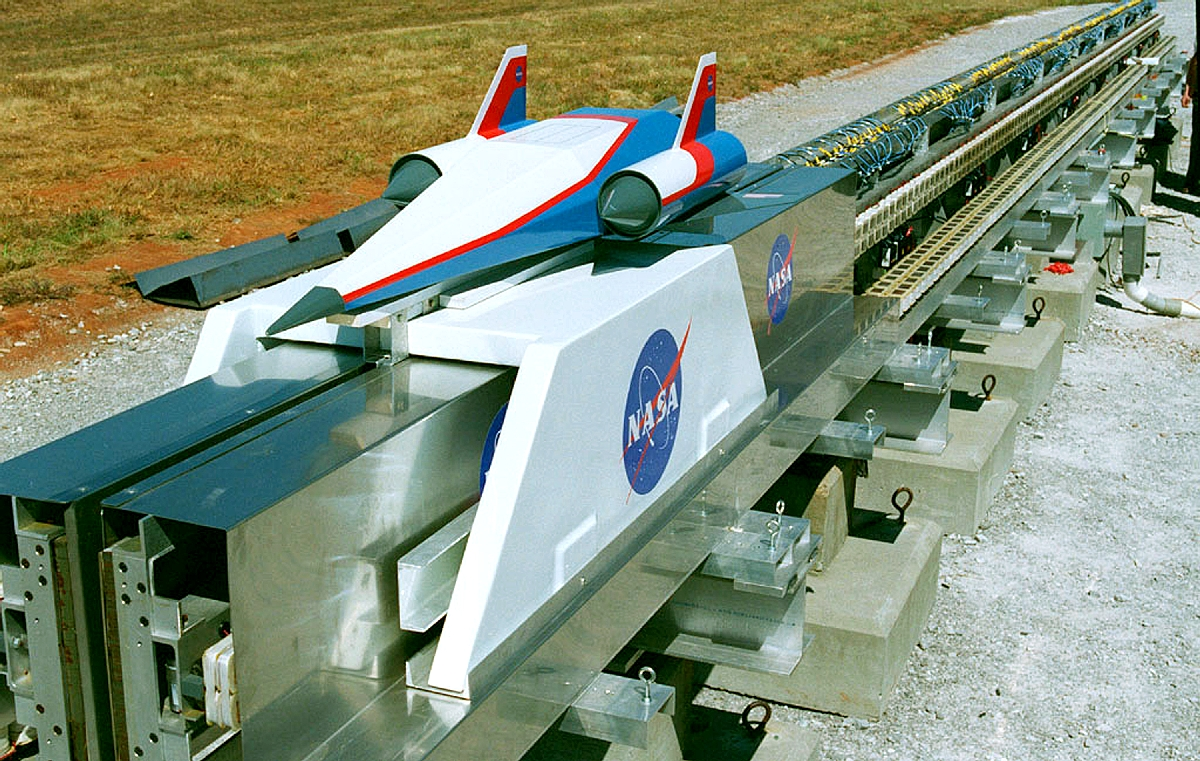
A track on test model scale for lower velocity magnetic launch assist

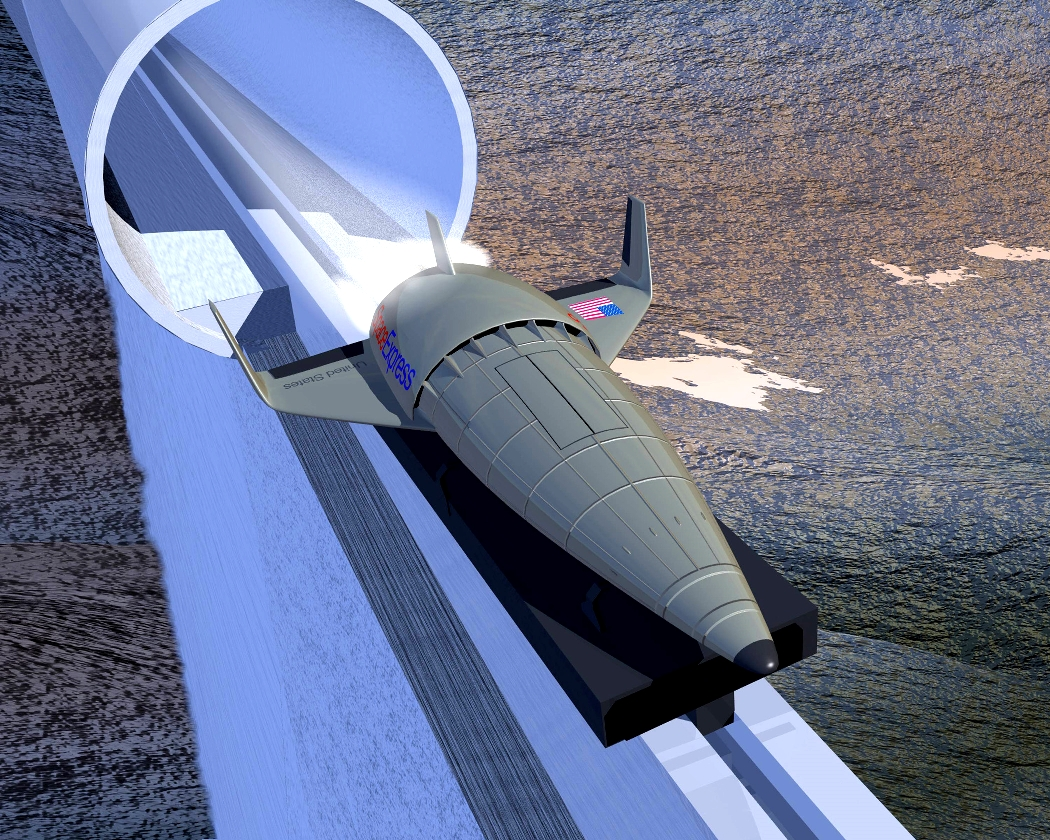
A prior concept for likewise a maglev horizontal launch assist system but at far lesser velocity: MagLifter.

James R. Powell invented the superconducting maglev concept in the 1960s with a colleague, Gordon Danby, also at Brookhaven National Laboratory, which was subsequently developed into modern maglev trains. Later, Powell co-founded StarTram, Inc. with Dr. George Maise, an aerospace engineer who previously was at Brookhaven National Laboratory from 1974 to 1997 with particular expertise including reentry heating and hypersonic vehicle design.

A StarTram design was first published in a 2001 paper and patent, making reference to a 1994 paper on MagLifter. Developed by John C. Mankins, who was manager of Advanced Concept Studies at NASA, the MagLifter concept involved maglev launch assist for a few hundred m/s with a short track, 90% projected efficiency. Noting StarTram is essentially MagLifter taken to a much greater extreme, both MagLifter and StarTram were discussed the following year in a concept study performed by ZHA for NASA's Kennedy Space Center, also considered together by Maglev 2000 with Powell and Danby.

Subsequent design modifies StarTram into a generation 1 version, a generation 2 version, and an alternative generation 1.5 variant.

John Rather, who served as assistant director for Space Technology (Program Development) at NASA, said:

It is a little known fact that an effort was made in the mid-1990s by NASA HQ, Marshall Space Flight Center, and key private innovators to change the basic paradigms of space access and development. Generically these efforts involved electromagnetic launch methods and new approaches for high power electrical systems in space. ...

StarTram was conceived from first principles to reduce the cost and improve the efficiency of space access by a factor of more than a hundred. ...

The overall feasibility and cost of the StarTram approach was validated in 2005 by a thorough “murder board” study conducted at Sandia National Laboratory.

— Dr. Rather

== Description ==
=== Generation 1 System ===
The Gen-1 system proposes to accelerate uncrewed craft at 30 g through a 130-kilometer (81 mi) long tunnel, with a plasma window preventing vacuum loss when the exit's mechanical shutter is briefly open, evacuated of air with an MHD pump. (The plasma window is larger than prior constructions, 2.5 MW estimated power consumption itself for 3 metres (9.8 ft) diameter). In the reference design, the exit is on the surface of a mountain peak of 6,000 metres (20,000 ft) altitude, where 8.78 kilometres per second (5.46 mi/s) launch velocity at a 10-degree angle takes cargo capsules to low Earth orbit when combined with a small rocket burn providing 0.63 kilometres per second (0.39 mi/s) for orbit circularization. With a bonus from Earth's rotation if firing east, the extra speed, well beyond nominal orbital velocity, compensates for losses during ascent including 0.8 kilometres per second (0.50 mi/s) from atmospheric drag.

A 40-ton cargo craft, 2 metres (6 ft 7 in) diameter and 13 metres (43 ft) length, would experience briefly the effects of atmospheric passage. With an effective drag coefficient of 0.09, peak deceleration for the mountain-launched elongated projectile is momentarily 20 g but halves within the first 4 seconds and continues to decrease as it quickly passes above the bulk of the remaining atmosphere.

In the first moments after exiting the launch tube, the heating rate with an optimal nose shape is around 30 kW/cm^{2} at the stagnation point, though much less over most of the nose, but drops below 10 kW/cm^{2} within a few seconds. Transpiration water cooling is planned, briefly consuming up to ≈ 100 liters/m^{2} of water per second. Several percent of the projectile's mass in water is calculated to suffice.

The tunnel tube itself for Gen-1 has no superconductors, no cryogenic cooling requirements, and none of it is at higher elevation than the local ground surface. Except for probable usage of SMES as the electrical power storage method, superconducting magnets are only on the moving spacecraft, inducing current into relatively inexpensive aluminum loops on the acceleration tunnel walls, levitating the craft with 10 centimeters clearance, while meanwhile a second set of aluminum loops on the walls carries an AC current accelerating the craft: a linear synchronous motor.

Powell predicts a total expense, primarily hardware costs, of $43 per kilogram of payload with 35-ton payloads being launched 10+ times a day, as opposed to rocket launch prices of $10,000 to $25,000 per kilogram to low Earth orbit at the time. The estimated cost of electrical energy to reach the velocity of low Earth orbit is under $1 per kilogram of payload: 6 cents per kilowatt-hour contemporary industrial electricity cost, 8.78 kilometres per second (5.46 mi/s) launch kinetic energy of 38.5 MJ per kilogram, and 87.5% of mass payload, accelerated at high efficiency by this linear electric motor.

=== Generation 2 System ===
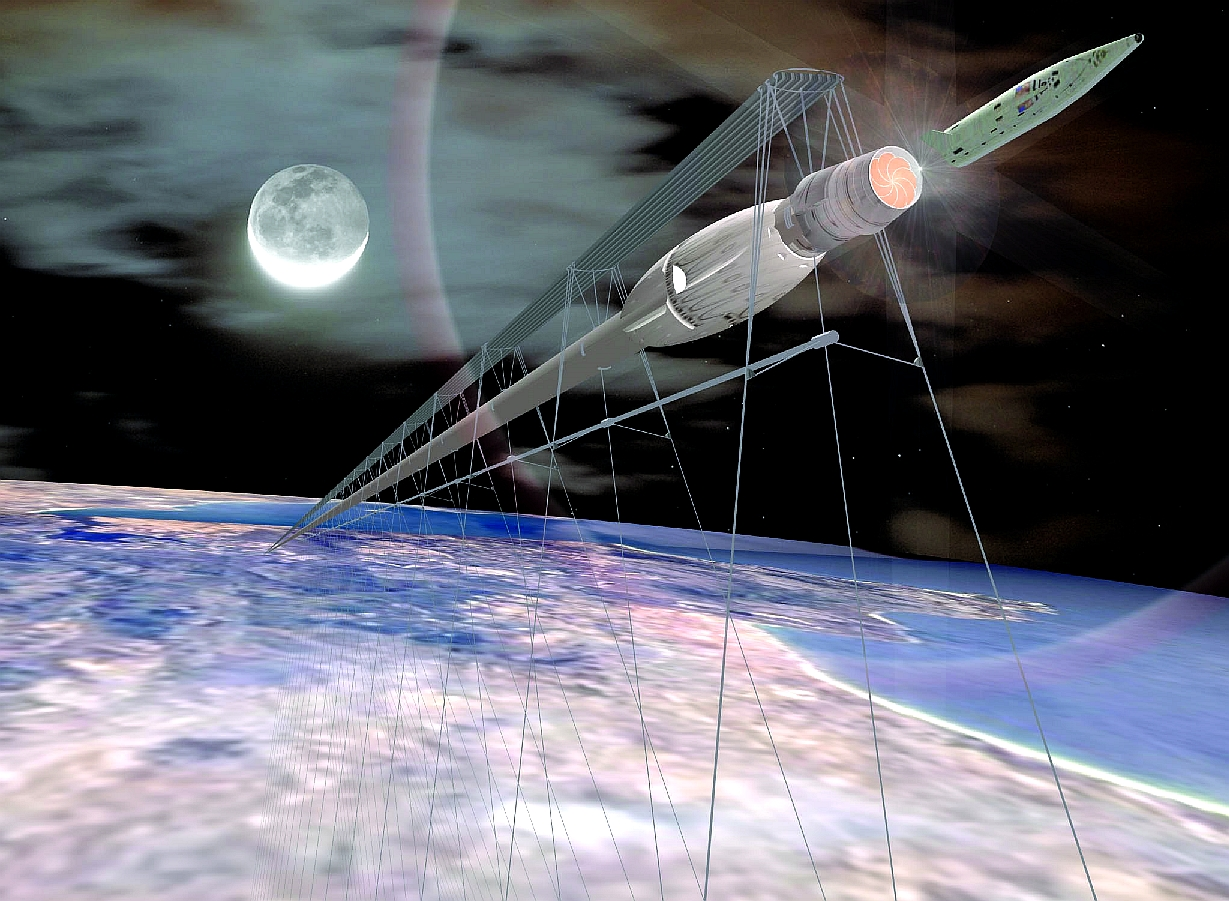
Artist's impression of StarTram Generation 2, a megastructure more ambitious than Gen-1, reaching above 96% of the atmosphere's mass

The Gen-2 variant of the StarTram is supposed to be for reusable crewed capsules, intended to be low g-force, 2 to 3 g acceleration in the launch tube and an elevated exit at such high altitude (22 kilometres (14 mi)) that peak aerodynamic deceleration becomes ≈ 1g. Though NASA test pilots have handled multiple times those g-forces, the low acceleration is intended to allow eligibility to the broadest spectrum of the general public.

With such relatively slow acceleration, the Gen-2 system requires 1,000 to 1,500 kilometres (620 to 930 mi) length. The cost for the non-elevated majority of the tube's length is estimated to be several tens of millions of dollars per kilometer, proportionately a semi-similar expense per unit length to the tunneling portion of the former Superconducting Super Collider project (originally planned to have 72 kilometres (45 mi) of 5-meter (16 ft) diameter vacuum tunnel excavated for $2 billion) or to some existing maglev train lines where Powell's Maglev 2000 system is claiming major cost-reducing further innovations. An area of Antarctica 3 kilometres (9,800 ft) above sea level is one siting option, especially as the ice sheet is viewed as relatively easy to tunnel through.

For the elevated end portion, the design considers magnetic levitation to be relatively less expensive than alternatives for elevating a launch tube of a mass driver (tethered balloons, compressive or inflated aerospace-material megastructures). A 280-megaamp current in ground cables creates a magnetic field of 30 Gauss strength at 22 kilometres (72,000 ft) above sea level (somewhat less above local terrain depending on site choice), while cables on the elevated final portion of the tube carry 14 megaamps in the opposite direction, generating a repulsive force of 4 tons per meter; it is claimed that this would keep the 2-ton/meter structure strongly pressing up on its angled tethers, a tensile structure on grand scale. In the example of niobium-titanium superconductor carrying 2 × 10^{5} amps per cm^{2}, the levitated platform would have 7 cables, each 23 cm^{2} (3.6 sq in) of conductor cross-section when including copper stabilizer.

=== Generation 1.5 System (lower-velocity option) ===
An alternative, Gen-1.5, would launch passenger spacecraft at 4 kilometres per second (2.5 mi/s) from a mountaintop at around 6000 meters above sea level from a ≈ 270 kilometres (170 mi) tunnel accelerating at ≈ 3 g.

Though construction costs would be lower than the Gen-2 version, Gen-1.5 would differ from other StarTram variants by requiring 4+ km/s to be provided by other means, like rocket propulsion. However, the non-linear nature of the rocket equation still makes the payload fraction for such a vehicle significantly greater than that of a conventional rocket unassisted by electromagnetic launch, and a vehicle with high available weight margins and safety factors should be far easier to mass-produce cheaply or make reusable with rapid turnaround than current 8 kilometres per second (5.0 mi/s) rockets. Dr. Powell remarks that present launch vehicles "have many complex systems that operate near their failure point, with very limited redundancy," with extreme hardware performance relative to weight being a top driver of expense. (Fuel itself is on the order of 1% of the current costs to orbit).

Alternatively, Gen-1.5 could be combined with another non-rocket spacelaunch system, like a Momentum Exchange Tether similar to the HASTOL concept which was intended to take a 4 kilometres per second (2.5 mi/s) vehicle to orbit. Because tethers are subject to highly exponential scaling, such a tether would be much easier to build using current technologies than one providing full orbital velocity by itself.

The launch tunnel length in this proposal could be reduced by accepting correspondingly larger forces on the passengers. A ≈ 50 to 80 kilometres (31 to 50 mi) tunnel would generate forces of ≈ 10-15 g, which physically fit test pilots have endured successfully in centrifuge tests, but a slower acceleration with a longer tunnel would ease passenger requirements and reduce peak power draw, which in turn would decrease power conditioning expenses.

== Economics and potential ==
The StarTram ground facility concept is claimed to be reusable after each launch without extensive maintenance, as it would essentially be a large linear synchronous electric motor. This would shift most of the "requirement for achieving orbit to a robust ground infrastructure," intended to have neither high performance relative to weight requirements nor such as the $25,000 per kilogram of flyable dry weight costs of the Space Shuttle. The designers estimate a construction cost for Generation 1 of $19 billion, becoming $67 billion for passenger-capable Generation 2.

The alternative Generation 1.5 design, such as 4 kilometres per second (2.5 mi/s) launch velocity, would be intermediate in velocity terms between Gen-1's 8.8 kilometres per second (5.5 mi/s) and the Maglifter design (which had $0.2 billion estimated cost for 0.3 kilometres per second (0.19 mi/s) launch assist in the case of a 50-ton vehicle).

The Generation 2 goal is $13,000 per person. Up to 4 million people could be sent to orbit per decade per Gen-2 facility if as estimated.

== Challenges ==
=== Gen-1 ===
The largest challenge for Gen-1 is considered by the researchers to be sufficiently affordable storage, rapid delivery, and handling of the power requirements.

For needed electrical energy storage (discharged over 30 seconds with about 50 gigawatt average and about 100 gigawatts peak), SMES cost performance on such unusual scale is anticipated of around a dollar per kilojoule and $20 per kW-peak. Such would be novel in scale but not greatly different planned cost performance than obtained in other smaller pulsed power energy storage systems (such as quick-discharge modern supercapacitors dropping from $151/kJ to $2.85/kJ cost between 1998 and 2006 while being predicted to later reach a dollar per kJ, lead acid batteries which can be $10 per kW-peak for a few seconds, or experimental railgun compulsator power supplies). The study notes pulsed MHD generators may be an alternative.

For MagLifter, General Electric estimated in 1997-2000 that a set of hydroelectric flywheel pulse power generators could be manufactured for a cost equating to $5.40 per kJ and $27 per kW-peak. For StarTram, the SMES design choice is a better (less expensive) approach than pulse generators according to Powell.

The single largest predicted capital cost for Gen-1 is the power conditioning, from an initially DC discharge to the AC current wave, dealing for a few seconds with very high power, up to 100 gigawatts, at a cost estimated to be $100 per kW-peak. Yet, compared to some other potential implementations of a coilgun launcher with relatively higher requirements for pulse power switching devices (an example being an escape velocity design of 7.8 kilometres (4.8 mi) length after a 1977 NASA Ames study determined how to survive atmospheric passage from ground launch), which are not always semiconductor-based, the 130-km acceleration tube length of Gen-1 spreads out energy input requirements over a longer acceleration duration. Such makes peak input power handling requirements be not more than about 2 GW per ton of the vehicle. The tradeoff of greater expense for the tunnel itself is incurred, but the tunnel is estimated to be about $4.4 billion including $1500 per cubic meter excavation, a minority of total system cost.

=== Gen-1.5 ===
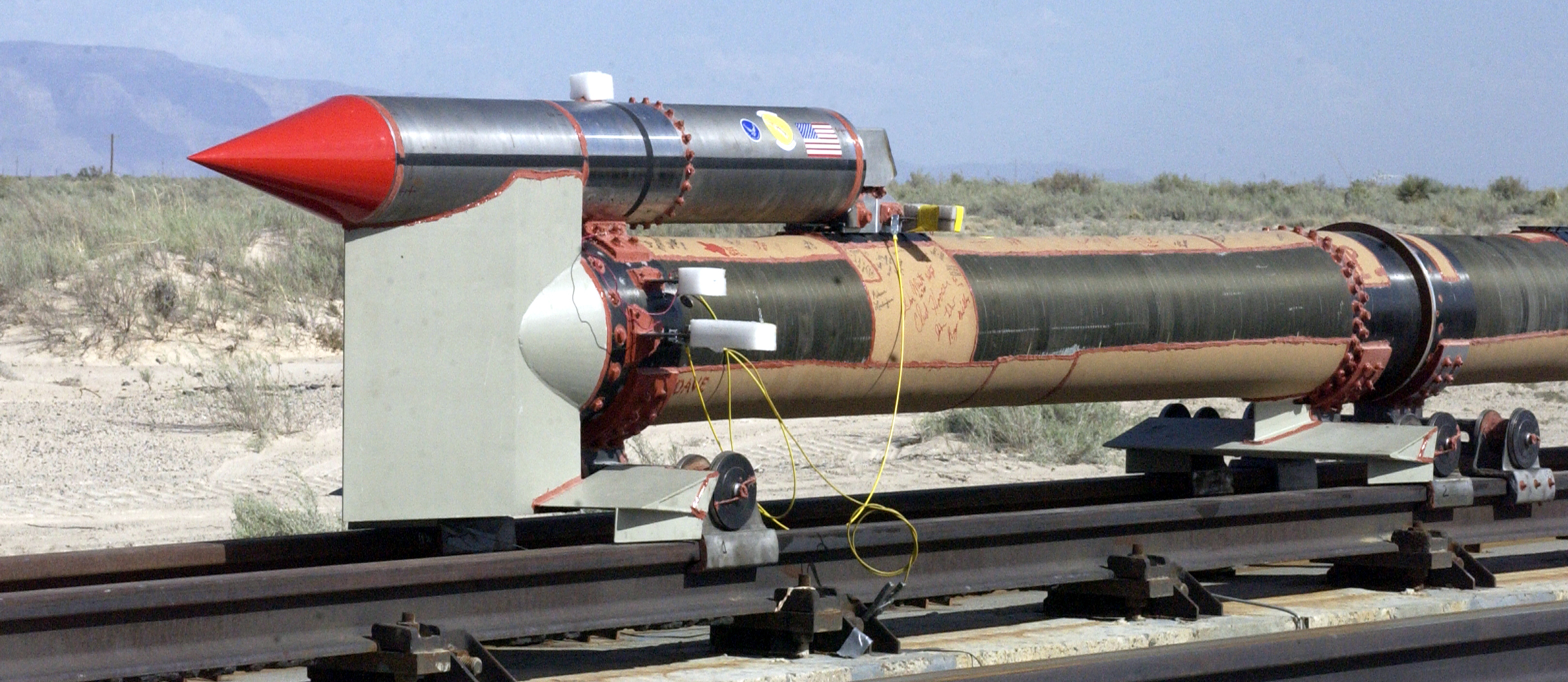
The depicted sled obtained 2.9 km/s without magnetic levitation, at Holloman Air Force Base. Holloman AFB has also been running a maglev high-speed test track development program. A 2006 report gave Mach 10 velocity (3.4 km/s) as a future goal for the maglev version, for general DoD hypersonic test applications.

The current land speed record of 2.9 km/s was obtained by a sled on 5 kilometers of rail track mostly in a helium-filled tunnel, in a $20 million project. The Gen-1.5 version of the StarTram for launch of passenger RLVs at 4 km/s velocity from the surface of a mountain would be significantly higher speed with a far more massive vehicle. However, such would accelerate in a lengthy vacuum tunnel without air or gas drag, with levitation preventing hypervelocity physical rail contact, and with 3 orders of magnitude higher anticipated funding. Many challenges including high initial capital cost would overlap with Gen-1, though not having the levitated launch tube of Gen-2.

=== Gen-2 ===
Gen-2 introduces particular extra challenge with its elevated launch tube, levitating both the vehicle and part of the tube (unlike Gen-1 and Gen-1.5 which only levitate the vehicle). As of 2010 operating maglev systems levitate the train by approximately 15 millimeters (0.59 in). For the Gen-2 version of the StarTram, it is necessary to levitate the track over up to 22 kilometres (72,000 ft), a distance greater by a factor of 1.5 million.

The force between two conducting lines is given by $F=(\mu I_1 I_2 l)/(2\pi r)$, (Ampère's force law). Here F is the force, $\mu = \mu_0 \mu_r$ the permeability, $I_1, I_2$ the electric currents, $l$ the length of the lines and $r$ their distance. To exert 4,000 kg/m (8,100 lb/yd) over a distance of 20 kilometres (12 mi) in air ($\mu_r$ ≈ 1) ground $I_1$ ≈ 280 × 10^{6}A is needed if levitated $I_2$ ≈ 14 × 10^{6}A. For comparison, in lightning the maximal current is about 10^{5}A, cf. properties of lightning, though resistive power dissipation involved in a current flowing through a conductor is proportional to the voltage drop, high for a lightning discharge of millions of volts in air but ideally zero for a zero-resistance superconductor.

While the performance of niobium-titanium superconductor is technically sufficient (a critical current density of 5 × 10^{5} A/cm^{2} under the relevant magnetic field conditions for the levitated platform, 40% of that in practice after a safety factor), uncertainties on economics include a far more optimistic assumption for Gen-2 of $0.2 per kA-meter of superconductor compared to the $2 per kA-meter assumed for Gen-1 (where Gen-1 doesn't have any of its launch tube levitated but uses superconducting cable for a large SMES and within the maglev craft launched). NbTi was the design choice under the available economies of scale for cooling, since it presently costs $1 per kA-meter, while high temperature superconductors so far still cost much more for the conductor itself per kA-meter.

If considering a design with an acceleration up to 10 g (which is higher than the re-entry acceleration of Apollo 16) then the whole track must be at least 326 kilometres (203 mi) long for a passenger version of the Gen-2 system. Such length allows use of the approximation for an infinite line to calculate the force. The preceding neglects how only the final portion of the track is levitated, but a more complex calculation only changes the result for force per unit length of it by 10-20% (f_{gl} = 0.8 to 0.9 instead of 1).

The researchers themselves do not consider there to be any doubt whether the levitation would work in terms of force exerted (a consequence of Ampère's force law) but see the primary challenge as the practical engineering complexities of erection of the tube, while a substantial portion of engineering analysis focused on handling bending caused by wind. The active structure is calculated to bend by a fraction of a meter per kilometer under wind in the very thin air at its high altitude, a slight curvature theoretically handled by guidance loops, with net levitation force beyond structure weight exceeding wind force by a factor of 200+ to keep tethers taut, and with the help of computer-controlled control tethers.

== See also ==
- Non-rocket spacelaunch
- Rocket sled launch
- Vactrain
- High altitude platform station as a space port
- ThothX Tower
