= Deb Niemeier =

American civil and environmental engineer

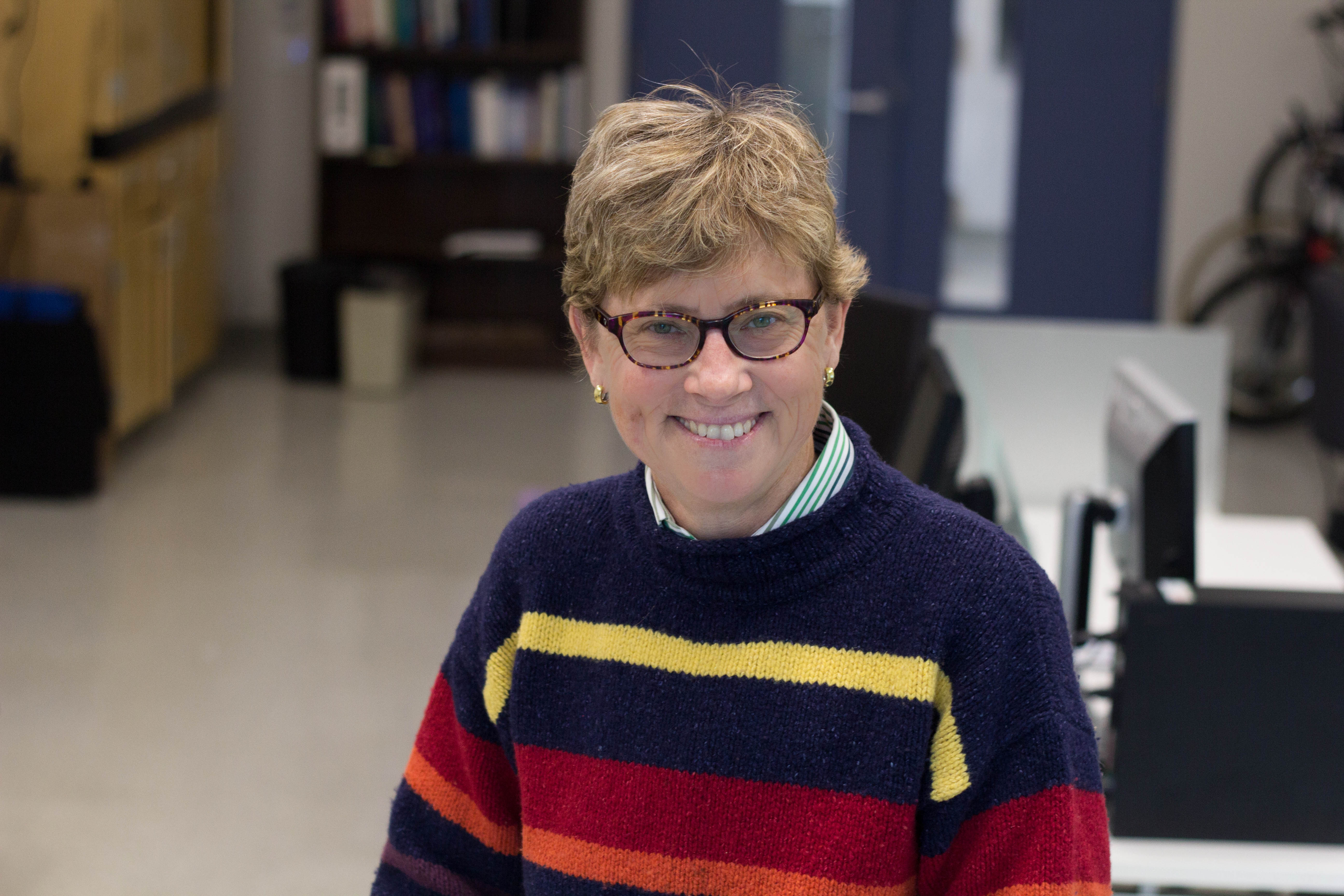
- Niemeier in 2014
- Born: Deb A. Niemeier; El Paso, Texas, U.S.
- Education: University of Texas at Austin (B.S., 1982); University of Washington (Ph.D., 1994)
- Awards: Bower Award and Prize for Achievement in Science (2023); Perry L. McCarty Founders Award (2022); Guggenheim Fellowship (2015); NSF CAREER Award (1997); Aldo Leopold Leadership Award (2005)
- Engineering career
- Discipline: Civil engineering, environmental engineering, transportation engineering
- Projects: Federal regulatory guidance for particulate matter (PM) hotspot analysis Caltrans Air Quality Project; Mobile source vehicle emissions inventory modeling
- Significant design: Interdisciplinary data modeling mapping travel behavior, vehicle emissions, and socioeconomic/environmental health disparities

Deb A. Niemeier is an American transportation engineer known for her work on measuring vehicle emissions and its impact on the air quality in nearby neighborhoods, on the effects of carbon dioxide on climate change, on gender differences in commuting behavior, and on the quantification of transport accessibility. She is James & Alice B. Clark Distinguished Chair Professor of Civil and Environmental Engineering at the University of Maryland, College Park.

== Education and career ==
Niemeier is originally from Texas, and majored in civil engineering at the University of Texas at Austin, graduating in 1982. After working as a consultant in Maine, she returned to graduate school at the University of Washington, where she completed a Ph.D. in 1994 under the supervision of Scott Rutherford.

She became a faculty member in civil engineering at the University of California, Davis, where her service included terms as department chair, Director of the John Muir Institute, Associate Vice Chancellor for Research, and editor-in-chief for the journals Sustainable Cities and Society and Transportation Research Part A. She moved from Davis to the University of Maryland as Clark Professor in 2019.

== Recognition ==
In 1997, Niemeier was a recipient of the National Science Foundation (NSF) CAREER Award, recognizing her early-stage potential as an academic leader in transportation modeling. Niemeier was named a Fellow of the American Association for the Advancement of Science in 2014 and a Guggenheim Fellow in 2015. In 2017, she was elected a member of the National Academy of Engineering "for developing groundbreaking tools to characterize the impact of transportation emissions on air quality and environmental justice". In 2021 she was elected to the American Philosophical Society. In 2022, Niemeier received the Perry L. McCarty Founders Award from the Association of Environmental Engineering and Science Professors (AEESP) for her significant contributions to environmental engineering education, research, and professional leadership. In 2023, She was a recipient of the Bower Award and Prize for Achievement in Science for her contributions to infrastructure development and environmental equity.
