= Plasma window =

Force field based on high-energy plasma

The plasma window (not to be confused with a plasma shield) is a technology that fills a volume of space with plasma confined by a magnetic field. With current technology, this volume is quite small and the plasma is generated as a flat plane inside a cylindrical space.

Plasma is any gas whose atoms or molecules have been ionized, and is a separate phase of matter. This is most commonly achieved by heating the gas to extremely high temperatures, although other methods exist. Plasma becomes increasingly viscous at higher temperatures, to the point where other matter has trouble passing through.

A plasma window's viscosity allows it to separate gas at standard atmospheric pressure from a total vacuum, and can reportedly withstand a pressure difference of up to nine atmospheres. At the same time, the plasma window will allow radiation such as laser beams and electron beams to pass. This property is the key to the plasma window's usefulness – the technology of the plasma window allows radiation that can only be generated in a vacuum to be applied to objects in an atmosphere. Electron-beam welding is a major application of plasma windows, making it practical outside a hard vacuum.

== History ==
The plasma window was invented at Brookhaven National Laboratory by Ady Hershcovitch and patented in 1995.

Further inventions using this principle include the plasma valve in 1996.

In 2014, a group of students from the University of Leicester released a study describing functioning of spaceship plasma deflector shields.

In 2015, Boeing was granted a patent on a force field system designed to protect against shock waves generated by explosions. It is not intended to protect against projectiles, radiation, or energy weapons such as lasers. The field purportedly works by using a combination of lasers, electricity and microwaves to rapidly heat up the air creating a field of (ionised) superheated air-plasma which disrupts, or at least attenuates, the shock wave. As of March 2016, no working models are known to have been demonstrated.

Michio Kaku proposes force fields consisting of three layers. The first is the high-powered plasma window which can vaporize incoming objects, block radiation, and particles. The second layer will consist of thousands of laser beams arranged in a tight lattice configuration to vaporize any objects that managed to go through the plasma screen, by the laser beams. The third layer is an invisible but stable sheet of material like carbon nanotubes, or graphene that is only one atom thick, and thus transparent, but stronger than steel to block possible debris from destroyed objects.

== Plasma valve ==
A related technology is the plasma valve, invented shortly after the plasma window. A plasma valve is a layer of gas in the shell of a particle accelerator. The ring of a particle accelerator contains a vacuum, and ordinarily a breach of this vacuum is disastrous. If, however, an accelerator equipped with plasma valve technology breaches, the gas layer is ionized within a nanosecond, creating a seal that prevents the accelerator's recompression. This gives technicians time to shut off the particle beam in the accelerator and slowly recompress the accelerator ring to avoid damage.

== Properties ==
The physical properties of the plasma window vary depending on application. The initial patent cited temperatures around 15,000 K (14,700 °C; 26,500 °F).

A significant limit to the size of the plasma window is the power required to sustain the arc - around 1 kW/cm being used for plasma windows formed inside a channel of only a few millimetres in diameter.

The plasma window emits a bright glow, with the color being dependent on the gas used.

== Similarity to fictional "force fields" ==
In science fiction, such as the television series Star Trek, a fictional technology known as the "force field" is often used as a device. In some cases it is used as an external "door" to hangars on spacecraft, to prevent the ship's internal atmosphere from venting into outer space. Plasma windows could theoretically serve such a purpose if enough energy were available to produce them. The StarTram proposal plans on use of a power-demanding MHD window over a multi-meter diameter launch tube periodically, but briefly at a time, to prevent excessive loss of vacuum during the moments when a mechanical shutter temporarily opens in advance of a hypervelocity spacecraft.

== See also ==
- Tractor beam

== Other sources ==
- BNL Wins R&D 100 Award for 'Plasma Window'
- Ady Hershcovitch. Plasma Window Technology for Propagating Particle Beams and Radiation from Vacuum to Atmosphere

== Bibliography ==
- Ady Hershcovitch (1995). High-pressure arcs as vacuum-atmosphere interface and plasma lens for nonvacuum electron beam welding machines, electron beam melting, and nonvacuum ion material modification, Journal of Applied Physics, 78(9): 5283–5288
