= James R. Powell (physicist) =

American physicist

James R. Powell was an American physicist, notable – together with Gordon Danby – for his work on superconducting maglev, for which he shared the Franklin Institute "Medal 2000 for Engineering". He was a director of the MAGLEV 2000 of Florida Corporation and Danby Powell Maglev Technology Corporation.

== Career ==
He received his BS in chemical engineering in 1953 from Carnegie Institute of Technology (now Carnegie Mellon University) and his Sc.D. in nuclear engineering from the Massachusetts Institute of Technology in 1958. He joined Brookhaven National Laboratory (BNL) in 1956, where he became a tenured senior nuclear engineer. He retired in late 1996. Powell died on May 27, 2019.

His inventions, including the inductive levitation and stabilization guideway, null flux geometry, and linear synchronous motor for vehicle propulsion, are the basis for the 500-kilometer (300-mile) Tokyo-to-Nagoya maglev route planned to be operational 2027. He also has worked on pebble-bed nuclear reactor. He was a lead developer of the StarTram proposal.
