= Franklin Institute Awards =

Science and engineering award presented by the Franklin Institute

- Country: United States
- Presented by: Franklin Institute
- First award: 1824
- Website: www.fi.edu/awards

The Franklin Institute Awards (or Benjamin Franklin Medal) is an American science and engineering award presented by the Franklin Institute, a science museum in Philadelphia. The Franklin Institute awards comprises the Benjamin Franklin Medals in seven areas of science and engineering, the Bower Awards and Prize for Achievement in Science, and the Bower Award for Business Leadership. Since 1824, the Institute has recognized "world-changing scientists, engineers, inventors, and industrialists—all of whom reflect Benjamin Franklin's spirit of curiosity, ingenuity, and innovation". Some of the noted past awardees include Nikola Tesla, Thomas Edison, Marie Curie, Max Planck, Albert Einstein, Stephen Hawking. Some of the Institute's 21st century awardees are Bill Gates, James P. Allison, Indra Nooyi, Jane Goodall, Elizabeth Blackburn, George Church, Robert S. Langer, and Alex Gorsky.

== Benjamin Franklin Medals ==
In 1998, the Benjamin Franklin Medals were created by reorganizing all of the endowed medals presented by The Franklin Institute at that time into a group of medals recognizing seven areas of study:

- Chemistry
- Computer and Cognitive Science
- Earth and Environmental Science
- Electrical Engineering
- Life Science
- Mechanical Engineering
- Physics

The first Benjamin Franklin Medals were presented in 1998. Medalists are selected by a Committee on Science and the Arts (CS&A), composed of local academics and professionals from the Philadelphia area.

== Bower Awards ==
The Bower Award and Prize for Achievement in Science and the Bower Award for Business Leadership are the newest awards, established by a $7.5 million bequest from Henry Bower in 1988. The annual Bower Prizes are US$250,000 each.

== Benjamin Franklin NextGen Award ==
The Benjamin Franklin NextGen Award is presented to an early-career investigator for a transformative discovery, development, innovation, or invention in science or engineering. The focus annually rotates through seven disciplines: chemistry, civil and mechanical engineering, computer and cognitive science, earth and environmental science, electrical engineering, life science, and physics. Recipients are presented with a crystal award a cash honorarium.

== Former awards ==
- Elliott Cresson Medal
- Frank P. Brown Medal
- Franklin Medal
- George R. Henderson Medal
- Howard N. Potts Medal
- John Price Wetherill Medal
- John Scott Medal
- Stuart Ballantine Medal

== List of laureates ==
The following table lists laureates of the Benjamin Franklin Medal (including the Bower Prizewinners), from 1998 onwards.

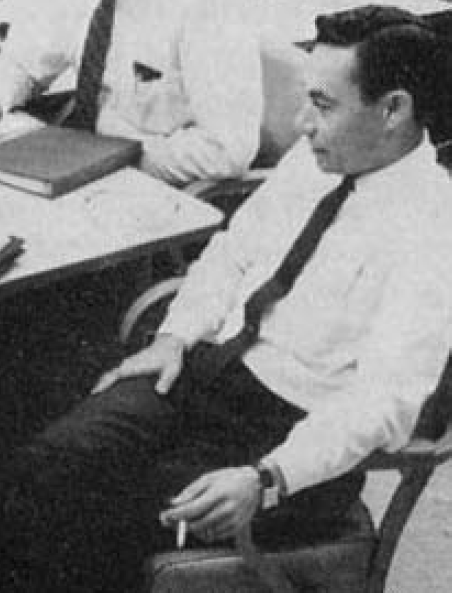
Mohamed Atalla, silicon semiconductor pioneer and inventor of the MOSFET (MOS transistor), received the 1975 Stuart Ballantine Medal in Physics.

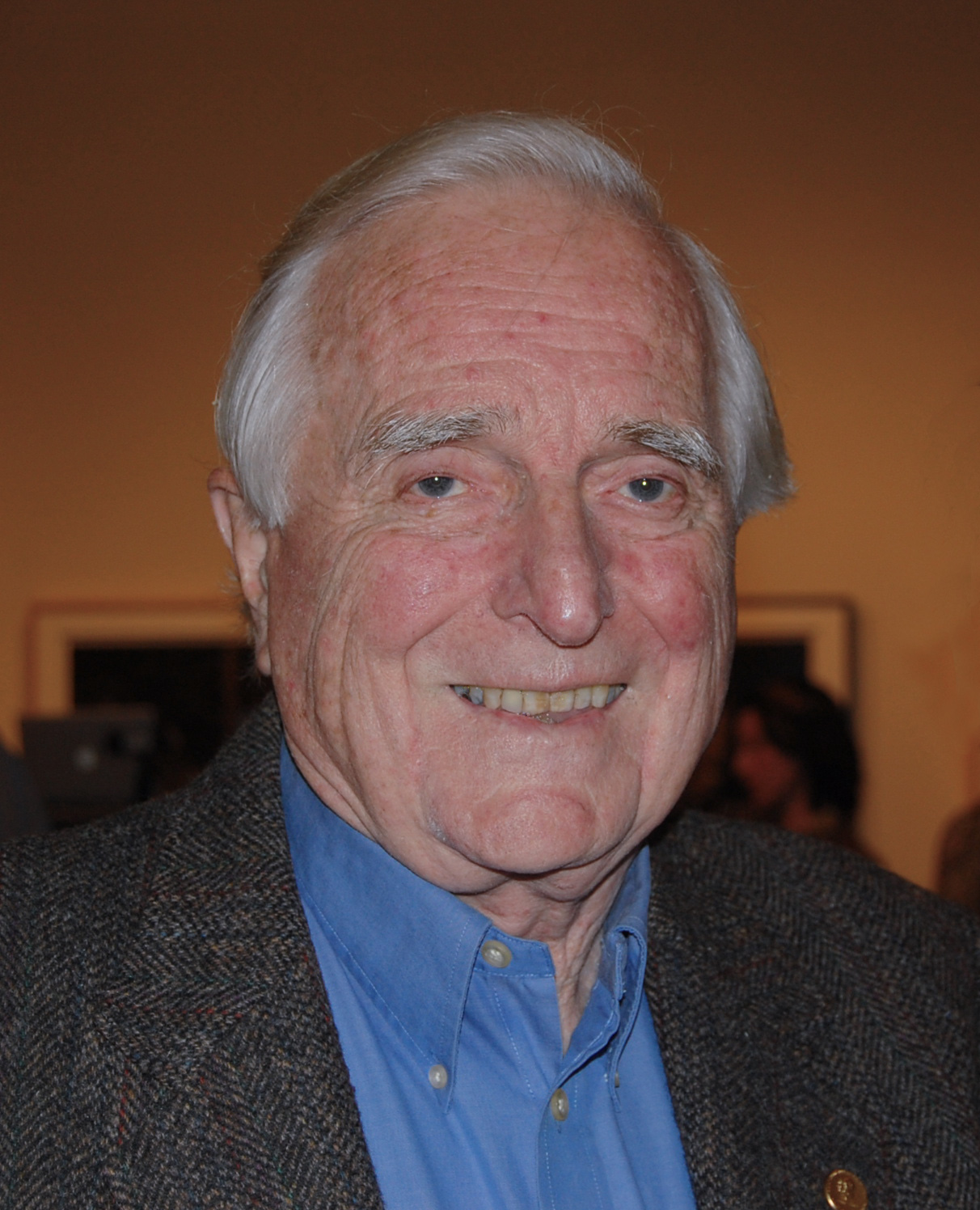
Douglas Engelbart, inventor of the computer mouse, received the 1999 Benjamin Franklin Medal in Physics.

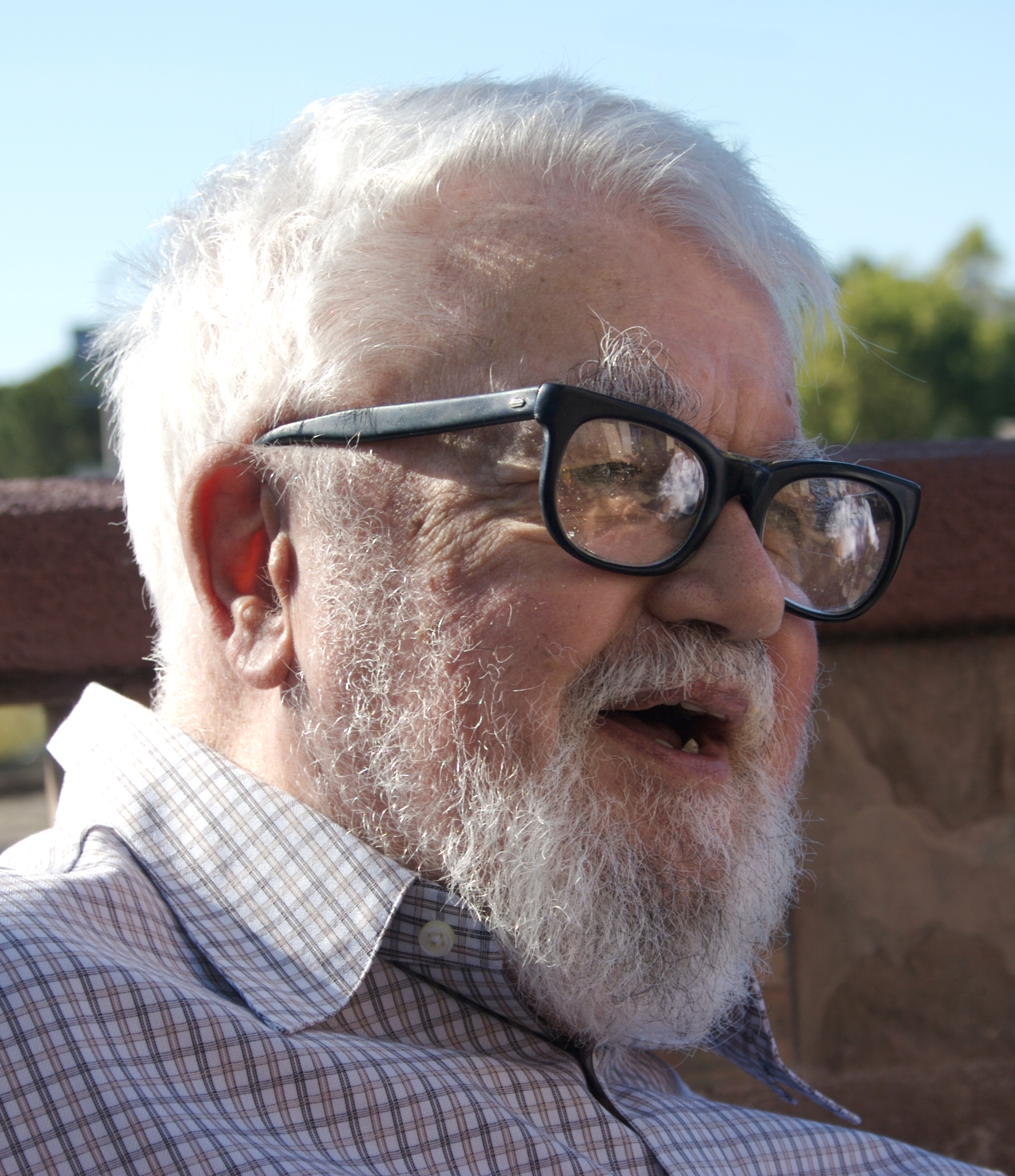
John McCarthy, AI pioneer, received the 2003 Benjamin Franklin Medal in Computer Science.

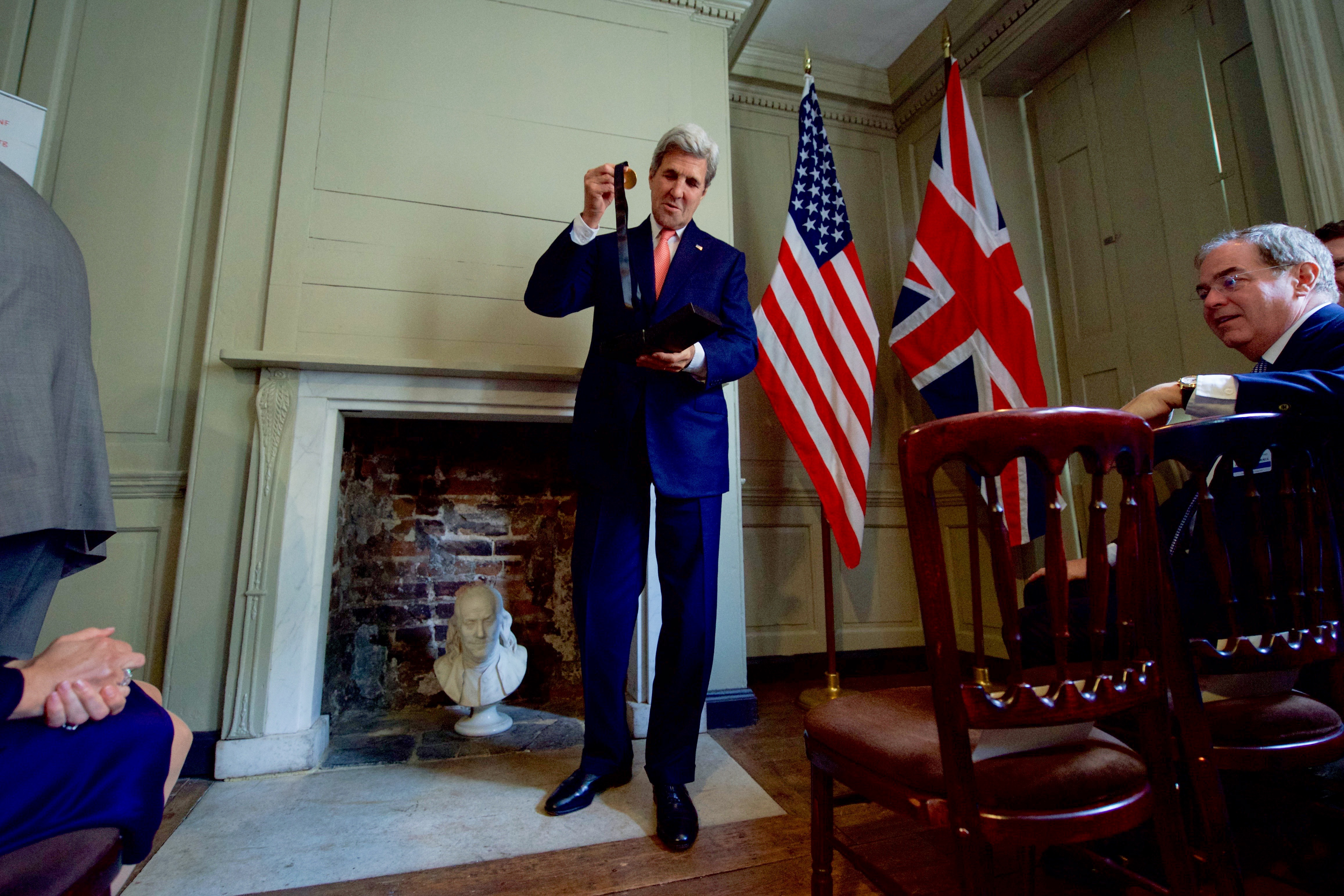
John Kerry receives the Benjamin Franklin Medal for Leadership in 2016.

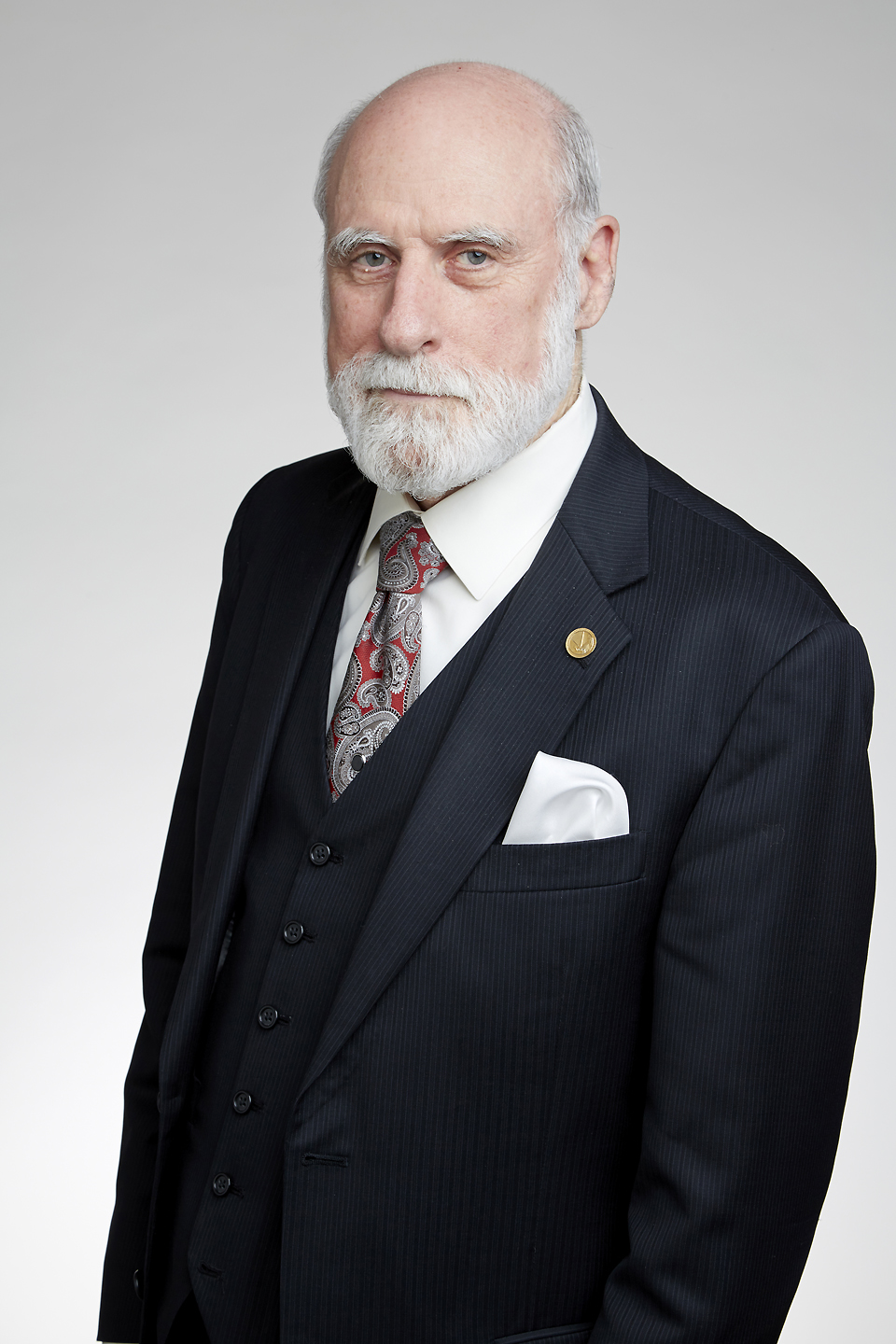
Vinton Cerf, Internet pioneer, received the 2018 Benjamin Franklin Medal in Computer Science.

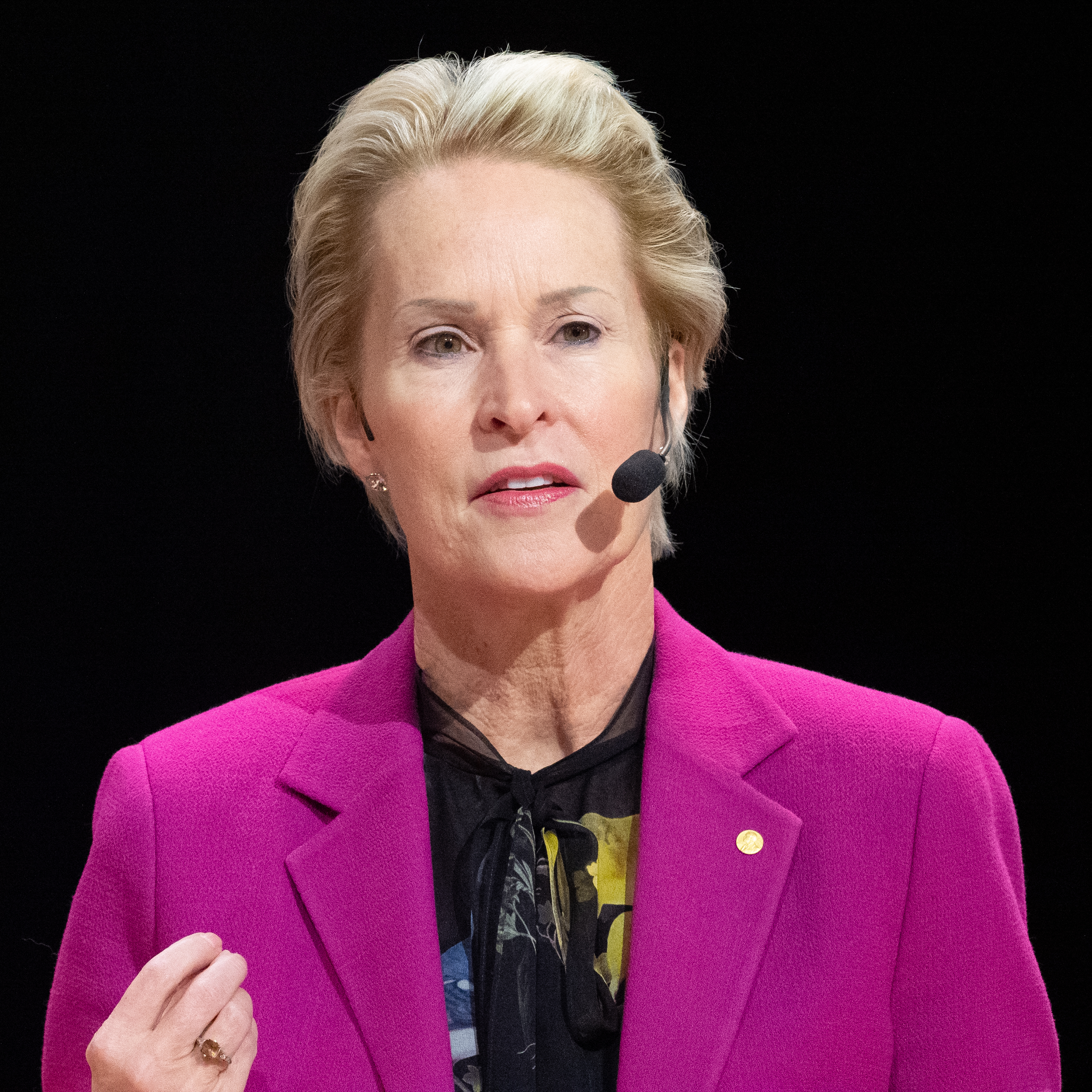
Frances Arnold, pioneer of directed evolution, received the 2019 Benjamin Franklin Medal in Chemistry.

Year	Name	Field
1998	John Diebel	Bower Award for Business Leadership
1998	Emmanuel Desurvire	Engineering
1998	Robert B. Laughlin	Physics
1998	David N. Payne	Engineering
1998	Stanley B. Prusiner	Life Science
1998	Martin J. Rees	Physics, Bower Award and Prize for Achievement in Science
1998	Horst L. Stormer	Physics
1998	Daniel C. Tsui	Physics
1998	Ahmed H. Zewail	Chemistry
1999	Ralph J. Cicerone	Earth Science, Bower Award and Prize for Achievement in Science
1999	Noam Chomsky	Computer and Cognitive Science
1999	Douglas C. Engelbart	Computer and Cognitive Science
1999	Walter Kaminsky	Chemistry
1999	Barry J. Marshall	Life Science
1999	John C. Mather	Physics
1999	Richard Shorthill	Computer and Cognitive Science
1999	Akira Tonomura	Physics
1999	P. Roy Vagelos	Bower Award for Business Leadership
1999	Victor Vali	Computer and Cognitive Science
2000	John Cocke	Computer and Cognitive Science
2000	Eric Cornell	Physics
2000	Gordon Danby	Mechanical Engineering
2000	Eville Gorham	Earth Science
2000	Robert H. Grubbs	Chemistry
2000	Wolfgang Ketterle	Physics
2000	Antoine Labeyrie	Electrical Engineering
2000	James R. Powell	Mechanical Engineering
2000	Alexander Rich	Life Science, Bower Award and Prize for Achievement in Science
2000	William J. Rutter	Life Science, Bower Award for Business Leadership
2000	Carl Wieman	Physics
2001	Paul Baran	Electrical Engineering, Bower Award and Prize for Achievement in Science
2001	Judah Folkman	Life Science
2001	Alan H. Guth	Physics
2001	Irwin Mark Jacobs	Bower Award for Business Leadership
2001	Marvin Minsky	Computer and Cognitive Science
2001	K. Barry Sharpless	Chemistry
2001	Rob Van der Voo	Earth Science
2001	Bernard Widrow	Electrical Engineering
2002	Norman L. Allinger	Chemistry
2002	John W. Cahn	Materials Science, Bower Award and Prize for Achievement in Science
2002	Mary-Dell Chilton	Life Science
2002	Sumio Iijima	Physics
2002	Gordon E. Moore	Bower Award for Business Leadership
2002	Shuji Nakamura	Engineering
2002	Alexandra Navrotsky	Earth Science
2002	Lucy Suchman	Computer and Cognitive Science
2003	Bishnu S. Atal	Electrical Engineering
2003	John N. Bahcall	Physics
2003	Raymond Davis Jr.	Physics
2003	Jane Goodall	Life Science
2003	Robin M. Hochstrasser	Chemistry
2003	Masatoshi Koshiba	Physics
2003	Paul B. MacCready	Engineering, Bower Award and Prize for Achievement in Science
2003	John McCarthy	Computer and Cognitive Science
2003	Norman A. Phillips	Earth Science
2003	Joseph Smagorinsky	Earth Science
2003	Charles H. Thornton	Engineering
2004	Roger Bacon	Mechanical Engineering
2004	Seymour Benzer	Life Science, Bower Award and Prize for Achievement in Science
2004	Raymond V. Damadian	Bower Award for Business Leadership
2004	Harry B. Gray	Chemistry
2004	Richard M. Karp	Computer and Cognitive Science
2004	Robert B. Meyer	Physics
2004	Robert E. Newnham	Electrical Engineering
2005	Elizabeth Helen Blackburn	Life Science
2005	Aravind K. Joshi	Computer and Cognitive Science
2005	Henri B. Kagan	Chemistry, Bower Award and Prize for Achievement in Science
2005	Yoichiro Nambu	Physics
2005	Peter R. Vail	Earth Science
2005	Andrew J. Viterbi	Electrical Engineering
2005	Alejandro Zaffaroni	Bower Award for Business Leadership
2006	Ray W. Clough	Engineering
2006	Samuel J. Danishefsky	Chemistry
2006	Narain G. Hingorani	Electrical Engineering, Bower Award and Prize for Achievement in Science
2006	Luna B. Leopold	Earth Science
2006	Donald Norman	Computer and Cognitive Science
2006	Fernando Nottebohm	Life Science
2006	Giacinto Scoles	Physics
2006	J. Peter Toennies	Physics
2006	R.E. Turner	Bower Award for Business Leadership
2006	M. Gordon Wolman	Earth Science
2007	Norman R. Augustine	Bower Award for Business Leadership
2007	Klaus Biemann	Chemistry
2007	Stuart K. Card	Computer and Cognitive Science, Bower Award and Prize for Achievement in Science
2007	Robert H. Dennard	Electrical Engineering
2007	Merton C. Flemings	Materials Science
2007	Arthur B. McDonald	Physics
2007	Steven W. Squyres	Earth Science
2007	Yoji Totsuka	Physics
2007	Nancy Wexler	Life Science
2008	Victor Ambros	Life Science
2008	David Baulcombe	Life Science
2008	Wallace Broecker	Earth Science
2008	Albert Eschenmoser	Chemistry
2008	Deborah Jin	Physics
2008	Takeo Kanade	Computer and Cognitive Science, Bower Award and Prize for Achievement in Science
2008	Judea Pearl	Computer and Cognitive Science
2008	Arun Phadke	Electrical Engineering
2008	Gary Ruvkun	Life Science
2008	Frederick Smith	Bower Award for Business Leadership
2008	James Thorp	Electrical Engineering
2009	Ruzena Bajcsy	Computer and Cognitive Science
2009	Stephen J. Benkovic	Life Science
2009	Sandra M. Faber	Physics, Bower Award and Prize for Achievement in Science
2009	J. Frederick Grassle	Earth Science
2009	T. Boone Pickens	Bower Award for Business Leadership
2009	Richard J. Robbins	Engineering
2009	George M. Whitesides	Chemistry
2009	Lotfi A. Zadeh	Electrical Engineering
2010	J. Ignacio Cirac	Physics
2010	Shafrira Goldwasser	Computer and Cognitive Science
2010	Peter C. Nowell	Life Science
2010	Gerhard M. Sessler	Electrical Engineering
2010	D. Brian Spalding	Mechanical Engineering
2010	JoAnne Stubbe	Chemistry
2010	James West	Electrical Engineering
2010	David J. Wineland	Physics
2010	Peter Zoller	Physics
2010	W. Richard Peltier	Earth and Environmental Science, Bower Award for Achievement in Science
2010	William H. Gates	Bower Award for Business Leadership
2011	John Robert Anderson	Computer and Cognitive Science
2011	Jillian F. Banfield	Earth and Environmental Science
2011	Nicola Cabibbo	Physics
2011	Ingrid Daubechies	Electrical Engineering
2011	Dean Kamen	Mechanical Engineering
2011	K.C. Nicolaou	Chemistry
2011	George Church	Life Science, Bower Award for Achievement in Science
2011	Fred Kavli	Bower Award for Business Leadership
2012	Vladimir Vapnik	Computer and Cognitive Science
2012	Lonnie Thompson	Earth and Environmental Science
2012	Ellen Stone Mosley-Thompson	Earth and Environmental Science
2012	Sean B. Carroll	Life Science
2012	Jerry Nelson	Electrical Engineering
2012	Rashid Sunyaev	Physics
2012	Zvi Hashin	Mechanical Engineering
2012	Louis E. Brus	Chemistry, Bower Award for Achievement in Science
2012	John Chambers	Bower Award for Business Leadership
2013	Jerrold Meinwald	Chemistry
2013	William Labov	Computer and Cognitive Science
2013	Robert A. Berner	Earth and Environmental Science
2013	Rudolf Jaenisch	Life Science
2013	Subra Suresh	Mechanical Engineering
2013	Alexander Dalgarno	Physics
2013	Michael S. Dell	Bower Award for Business Leadership
2013	Kenichi Iga	Electrical Engineering, Bower Award for Achievement in Science
2014	Daniel Kleppner	Physics
2014	Christopher T. Walsh	Chemistry
2014	Lisa Tauxe	Earth and Environmental Science
2014	Shunichi Iwasaki	Electrical Engineering
2014	Mark H. Kryder	Electrical Engineering
2014	Joachim Frank	Life Science
2014	Ali H. Nayfeh	Mechanical Engineering
2014	Edmund M. Clarke	Computer and Cognitive Science, Bower Award for Achievement in Science
2014	William W. George	Bower Award for Business Leadership
2015	Stephen Lippard	Chemistry
2015	Elissa Newport	Computer and Cognitive Science
2015	Syukuro Manabe	Earth and Environmental Science
2015	Roger F. Harrington	Electrical Engineering
2015	Cornelia Bargmann	Life Science
2015	Charles L. Kane	Physics
2015	Eugene Mele	Physics
2015	Shoucheng Zhang	Physics
2015	Jon Huntsman, Sr.	Bower Award for Business Leadership
2015	Jean-Pierre Kruth	Mechanical Engineering, Bower Award for Achievement in Science
2016	Nadrian C. Seeman	Chemistry
2016	Yale N. Patt	Computer and Cognitive Science
2016	Brian F. Atwater	Earth and Environmental Science
2016	Solomon W. Golomb	Electrical Engineering
2016	Robert S. Langer	Life Science
2016	Shu Chien	Mechanical Engineering
2016	Patrick Soon-Shiong	Bower Award for Business Leadership
2016	William J. Borucki	Physics, Bower Award for Achievement in Science
2017	Krzysztof Matyjaszewski	Chemistry
2017	Mitsuo Sawamoto	Chemistry
2017	Michael I. Posner	Computer and Cognitive Science
2017	Nick Holonyak, Jr.	Electrical Engineering
2017	Douglas C. Wallace	Life Science
2017	Mildred S. Dresselhaus	Materials Science and Engineering
2017	Marvin L. Cohen	Physics
2017	Claude Lorius	Earth and Environmental Science, Bower Award for Achievement in Science
2017	Alan Mulally	Bower Award for Business Leadership
2018	Susan Trumbore	Earth and Environmental Science
2018	Manijeh Razeghi	Electrical Engineering
2018	Adrian Bejan	Mechanical Engineering
2018	Helen Rhoda Quinn	Physics
2018	John B. Goodenough	Chemistry
2018	Vinton Gray Cerf	Computer and Cognitive Science
2018	Robert E. Kahn	Computer and Cognitive Science
2018	Philippe Horvath	Life Science, Bower Award for Achievement in Science
2018	Anne M. Mulcahy	Bower Award for Business Leadership
2019	John J. Hopfield	Physics
2019	John A. Rogers	Materials Engineering
2019	James P. Allison	Life Science
2019	Eli Yablonovitch	Electrical Engineering
2019	Gene E. Likens	Earth and Environmental Science
2019	Marcia K. Johnson	Computer and Cognitive Science
2019	Frances H. Arnold	Chemistry, Bower Award for Achievement in Science
2019	Indra K. Nooyi	Bower Award for Business Leadership
2021	Roberto Car	Chemistry
2021	Michele Parrinello	Chemistry
2021	Henry Kapteyn	Physics
2021	Margaret Murnane	Physics
2021	Jeremy Nathans	Life Science
2021	C. Daniel Mote	Mechanical Engineering
2021	Monica Turner	Earth and Environmental Science
2021	Barbara Partee	Computer and Cognitive Science
2021	Kunihiko Fukushima	Bower Award for Achievement in Science
2021	Arthur D. Levinson	Bower Award for Business Leadership
2022	Sallie W. Chisholm	Earth and Environmental Science
2022	Sheldon Weinbaum	Biomedical Engineering
2022	Carol V. Robinson	Chemistry
2022	Russell D. Dupuis	Electrical Engineering
2022	P. Daniel Dapkus	Electrical Engineering
2022	Katalin Karikó	Life Science
2022	Drew Weissman	Life Science
2022	Edward C. Stone	Physics
2023	R. Lawrence Edwards	Earth and Environmental Science
2023	Nader Engheta	Electrical Engineering
2023	Kenneth C. Frazier	Bower Award for Business Leadership
2023	Elaine Fuchs	Life Science
2023	Philip Kim	Physics
2023	Barbara H. Liskov	Computer and Cognitive Science
2023	Deb Niemeier	Civil and Mechanical Engineering and Bower Award for Achievement in Science
2023	Monika Schleier-Smith	Physics
2023	Richard Zare	Chemistry
2024	Mary C. Boyce	Mechanical Engineering
2024	Joanne Chory	Life Science
2024	Paula T. Hammond	Chemistry
2024	Paul D.N. Hebert	Earth and Environmental Science
2024	Robert M. Metcalfe	Electrical Engineering
2024	Gabriela S. Schlau-Cohen	Chemistry and Benjamin Franklin NextGen Award
2024	Lisa Su	Bower Award for Business Leadership
2024	David A. Weitz	Physics and Bower Award and Prize for Achievement in Science
2024	Janet F. Werker	Computer and Cognitive Science
2025	Muyinatu A. Lediju Bell	Electrical Engineering and Benjamin Franklin NextGen Award
2025	Steven M. Block	Life Science
2025	William James Dally	Computer and Cognitive Science
2025	Jamie Dimon	Bower Award for Business Leadership
2025	Naomi J. Halas	Chemistry
2025	John W. Hutchinson	Mechanical Engineering
2025	John P. Perdew	Physics
2025	Kurt Edward Petersen	Electrical Engineering
2025	Katharine N. Suding	Earth and Environmental Science and Bower Award and Prize for Achievement in Science

== See also ==
- List of general science and technology awards
