= Ady Hershcovitch =

Plasma physicist

Ady Hershcovitch is a plasma physicist best known for his 1995 invention, the plasma window, which was later patented. (United States Patent: 5578831:Hershcovitch). In the plasma window, a plasma (which is an ionized gas confined by electric and magnetic fields) separates air from a vacuum by preventing the air from rushing into the vacuum. This scientific development can facilitate non-vacuum ion material modification, manufacturing of superalloys, and high-quality non-vacuum electron-beam welding. The device has been compared to the force field in the Star Trek TV series. He is well known for his work in plasma physics at Brookhaven National Laboratory. He has over 80 publications and 15 patents.

== Academic career ==
Hershcovitch earned his master's in nuclear engineering in 1975 and his Sc.D. in applied plasma physics in 1977 at the Massachusetts Institute of Technology. In 1980, Hershcovitch continued his research at Brookhaven National Laboratory in Upton, NY. Some of his most notable research involves development of plasma windows for transmission of synchrotron radiation and particle beams, in-situ coating techniques for Relativistic Heavy Ion Collider (RHIC) designed to reduce cold-bore resistivity and electron cloud formation, working on the Active Denial System (ADS) for radioactive waste transmutation and sub-critical nuclear reactors, development of electron guns with plasma cathodes, directing projects in Russia aimed at development of high charge state DC ion sources for MeV ion implanters and developing a non-vacuum electron beam and in-water techniques like welders and water purifiers. He was an adjunct professor at Southern Methodist University in Dallas, Texas from 2006 to 2010 and is currently an adjunct professor at Stony Brook University in Stony Brook, NY.

=== International collaboration ===
In Tomsk, Russia, Hershcovitch works as a consultant for Plasma Sources LTD. He also works with the Skolkovo Foundation as a Nuclear Cluster Expert Panel Member to promote research that can result in commercial products. Since 2010, Hershcovitch has also been a visiting scientist at the Riken Nishina Center in Wako, Japan.

=== Awards and honors ===
In 1987, he received the I.R. 100 Award for the development of ion-sensitive probe and in 1996, after patenting the Plasma Window, Hershcovitch received the R&D 100 Award, both selected as one of the 100 most significant technological developments worldwide. On October 1, 2007, he was elected to the American Physical Society Fellowship.

== Personal life ==
Hershcovitch is currently married to Kathy Hershcovitch and resides in Long Island, NY.

== Media ==
Hershcovitch's plasma window was featured on the History Channel program "The Universe" pertaining to Weapons of the Future. The Plasma Window is featured in book by Michio Kaku titled "Physics of the Impossible". New Scientist has listed the plasma window as one of the 10 impossibilities conquered by science.
