= Manijeh Razeghi =

Iranian-American Physicist

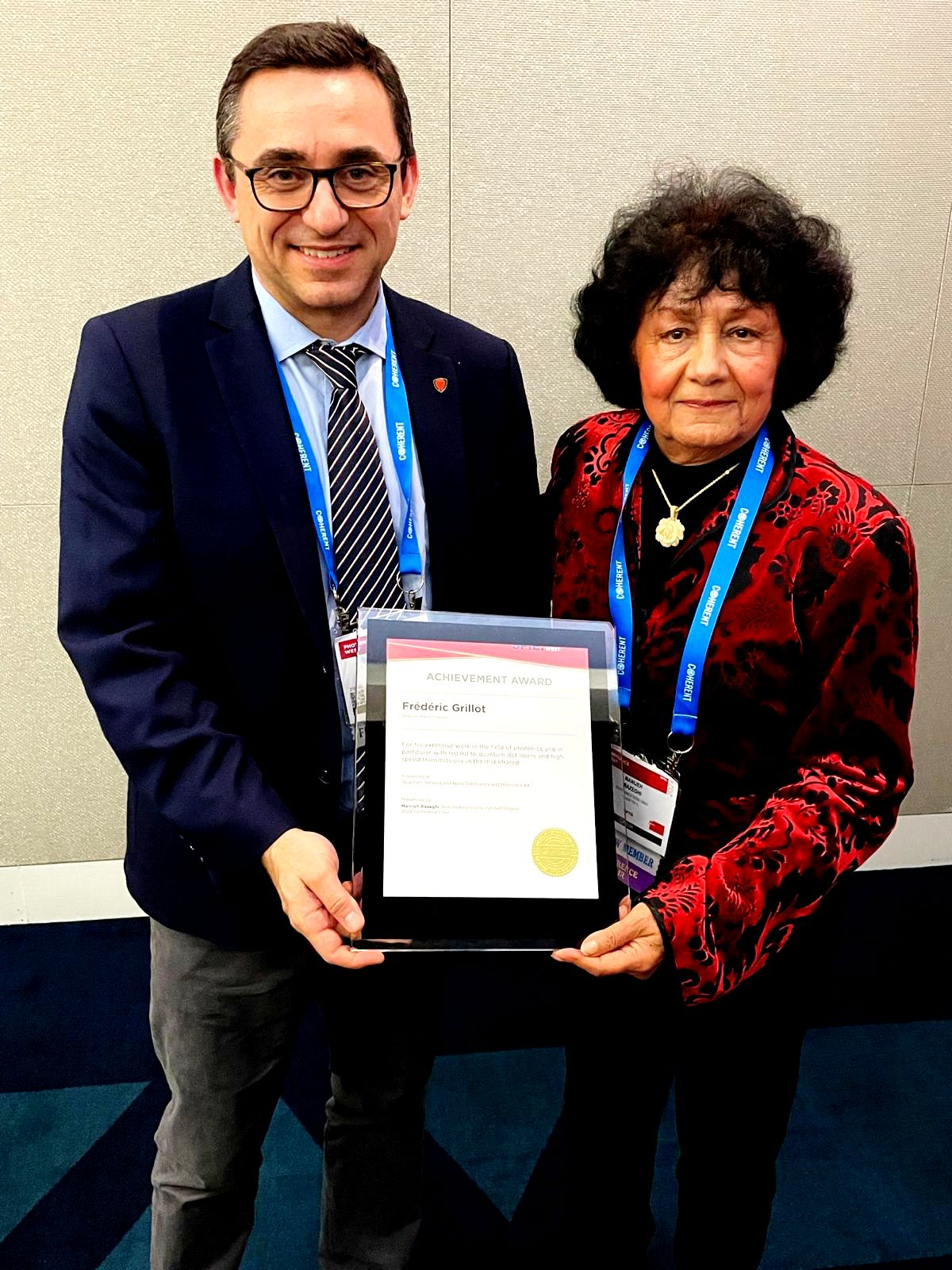
- Born: Iran
- Education: BS, Physics, Tehran University; DEA, Science des Matériaux; Docteur d'État ès Cycle, Solid State Physics; Docteur d'État ès Sciences Physiques; Université de Paris, France
- Scientific career
- Fields: semiconductors; optoelectronic devices; quantum nanoscience
- Workplaces: Head of the Exploratory Materials Lab at Thomson-CSF; Walter P. Murphy Professor & Director of the Center for Quantum Devices, Northwestern University
- Website: http://cqd.eecs.northwestern.edu/research/research.php Video: The Franklin Institute: Manijeh Razeghi, Inventor of Airport Scanners and Lasers That Carry the Internet

Manijeh Razeghi is an Iranian-American scientist in the fields of semiconductors and optoelectronic devices. She influenced modern epitaxial techniques for semiconductors such as low pressure metalorganic chemical vapor deposition (MOCVD), vapor phase epitaxy (VPE), molecular beam epitaxy (MBE), GasMBE, and MOMBE. These techniques have enabled the development of semiconductor devices and quantum structures with higher composition consistency and reliability, leading to major advancement in InP and GaAs based quantum photonics and electronic devices, which were at the core of the late 20th century optical fiber telecommunications and early information technology.

Her current research interests include III-Nitride semiconductor devices, quantum cascade lasers, quantum well infrared photodetectors (QWIP), and self assembled quantum dot devices.

== Career ==
Razeghi received a bachelor's degree in nuclear physics from Tehran University, then her doctorate from Université de Paris, France. In 1986, she became the head of Thomson-CSF Exploratory Materials Lab and made a major contribution to the field of semiconductor physics when she developed metalorganic chemical vapor deposition (MOCVD) epitaxial technique and published her pioneering work on InP in her book "The MOCVD Challenge Volume 1: A Survey of GaInAsP-InP for Photonic and Electronic Applications" (Adam Hilger Press, 1989).

In 1991, Razeghi moved to the US to become the Walter P. Murphy Professor and director of the Center for Quantum Devices, Department of Electrical Engineering and Computer Science, Northwestern University, where she continued her research in quantum devices such as lasers and photodetectors. In 1995, she published her second book "The MOCVD Challenge Volume 2: A Survey of GaInAsP-GaAs for Photonic and Electronic Device Applications" (Institute of Physics Publishing, 1995).

In 2018, Professor Razeghi won the Benjamin Franklin Medal for Electrical Engineering for "the realization of high-power terahertz frequency sources operating at room temperature using specially designed and manufactured semiconductor lasers, which enables a new generation of imagers, chemical/biological sensors, and ultra-broadband wireless communication systems." She developed lasers that can detect explosives and pathogens as well as electronic devices that will eventually deliver turbo-charged, super-fast WiFi.

She holds 60 patents and has published 20 books and more than 1000 papers.

== Awards and honors ==
- Benjamin Franklin Medal in Electrical Engineering - 2018
- Elected Lifetime Fellow of Institute of Electrical and Electronics Engineers (IEEE) - 2017
- Jan Czochralski Gold Medal - 2016
- IBM Faculty Award - 2013
- Elected Lifetime Fellow of Materials Research Society (MRS)- 2008
- Elected Fellow of American Physical Society (APS) - 2004
- Elected Fellow of Optical Society of America (OSA) - 2004
- Elected Fellow of International Engineering Consortium (IEC) - 2003
- Elected Fellow of Society of Photo-Optical Instrumentation Engineers (SPIE)- 2000
- Society of Women Engineers (SWE) Achievement Award - 1995
- IBM Europe Science and Technology Prize - 1987

== Selected works ==
- "The MOCVD Challenge Volume 1: A Survey of GaInAsP-InP for Photonic and Electronic Applications"
- "The MOCVD Challenge Volume 2: A Survey of GaInAsP-GaAs for Photonic and Electronic Device Applications"
- "Seeking Illumination"
- "Air-gapped distributed Bragg reflector improves dual-band long-wavelength IR cameras"
- "Breakthroughs Bring THz Spectroscopy, Sensing Closer to Mainstream"
- "High-power, high-wall-plug-efficiency quantum cascade lasers with high-brightness in continuous wave operation at 3–300μm"
