= Richard Shorthill =

American academic

Richard W. Shorthill was an American academic who was a professor of mechanical engineering at the University of Utah.

== Early life and education ==
Shorthill attended the University of Utah and received a B.A. in 1954 and a PhD in 1960.

Shorthill married Ellen and they had two children together.

== Career ==
Shorthill started his career with Boeing as a researcher. At Boeing, he worked on the Viking and Apollo space programs.

In 1999, he received the Franklin Institute Award along with Victor Vali for his work on the fiber optic gyroscope.
