= Gordon Danby =

Canadian-American physicist (1929–2016)

Gordon Thompson Danby (November 8, 1929 – August 2, 2016) was a Canadian-American physicist notable (together with Dr. James R. Powell) for his work on superconducting Maglev, for which he shared the Franklin Institute 'Medal 2000 for Engineering'.

Danby was born in Richmond, Ontario (now part of Ottawa) and went to Carleton University to study mathematics and physics before going to McGill University in Montreal, where he received a PhD in 1956. He started working at Brookhaven National Laboratory on Long Island, New York the following year and continued working there until 1999. Danby was responsible for designing the magnetic storage ring initially used for E821 at BNL, which was later moved to Fermilab for the Muon g-2 experiment. He was devoted to his wife Jane, and was personally known for his warmth and compassion.
