= ThothX Tower =

The ThothX Tower is a space launch platform tower design by Canadian aerospace company Thoth Technologies (ThothX). It is not a full space elevator, but a 20-kilometre-tall (12 mi) inflatable tubular tower structure 230 m (750 ft) in diameter, using elevators to transfer up and down to the stratospheric platform where rocket launch vehicles would land, refuel, load, and launch from to reach and return from orbit. It is projected that a launch from the top of the tower would save 30% of the fuel needed to reach orbit. From the top of the tower, the horizon would be 1,000 km (620 mi) away. The design has received UK and U.S. patent protection. The design is projected to cost US$5 billion and take 10 years to build. The full-sized tower would be about 20x taller than the tallest building as of 2015, Burj Khalifa of 828 m (2,717 ft)

Self-climbing electric elevators would travel within the inflated structure to convey material between the top platform and base. The cars would either run in the tower or along the outside and would carry about 10 tonnes (9.8 long tons; 11 short tons). Normal elevator cables cannot stretch longer than 1.5 km (0.93 mi) high. The tower would be built out of stacked kevlar cells inflated to extreme pressures with hydrogen or helium gas. Flywheels would be used to stabilize the structure, as the structure is much too tall for guywires to work. The tower is designed to be able to survive Category 5 hurricanes. With the reduction in fuel needed to reach orbit, it is projected that single-stage-to-orbit craft can be practicably used with current technology. The tower is 20 km (12 mi) high as most orbital rockets go 15 km (9.3 mi) up before curving towards orbit, and this tower could eliminate that portion of flight.

A 7-metre-high (23 ft) tower model was unveiled in 2009. A 1.5 km (0.93 mi) demonstration tower is planned to be built. The basic design may be extended to 200-kilometre-high (120 mi) towers.

Among other projected uses for the tower would be as a communications tower, low-altitude replacement for satellites, high-altitude wind turbine platforms.
