= Superconducting magnetic energy storage =

Energy storage technique

- Specific energy: 4–40 kJ/kg; 1–10 W·h/kg
- Energy density: less than 40 kJ/L
- Specific power: ~10000–100000 kW/kg
- Charge/discharge efficiency: 95%
- Self-discharge rate: 0%
- Cycle durability: Unlimited cycles

Superconducting magnetic energy storage (SMES) systems store energy in the magnetic field created by the flow of direct current in a superconducting coil that has been cryogenically cooled to a temperature below its superconducting critical temperature. This use of superconducting coils to store magnetic energy was invented by M. Ferrier in 1970.

A typical SMES system includes three parts: superconducting coil, power conditioning system and cryogenically cooled refrigerator. Once the superconducting coil is energized, the current will not decay and the magnetic energy can be stored indefinitely.

The stored energy can be released back to the network by discharging the coil. The power conditioning system uses an inverter/rectifier to transform alternating current (AC) power to direct current or convert DC back to AC power. The inverter/rectifier accounts for about 2–3% energy loss in each direction. SMES loses the least electricity in the energy storage process compared to other methods of storing energy. SMES systems are highly efficient; the round-trip efficiency is greater than 95%.

Due to the energy requirements of refrigeration and the high cost of superconducting wire, SMES is currently used for short duration energy storage. Therefore, SMES is most commonly devoted to improving power quality.

== Advantages over other energy storage methods ==
There are several reasons for using superconducting magnetic energy storage instead of other energy storage methods. The most important advantage of SMES is that the time delay during charge and discharge is quite short. Power is available almost instantaneously and very high power output can be provided for a brief period of time. Other energy storage methods, such as pumped hydro or compressed air, have a substantial time delay associated with the energy conversion of stored mechanical energy back into electricity. Thus if demand is immediate, SMES is a viable option. Another advantage is that the loss of power is less than other storage methods because electric currents encounter no resistance. Additionally the main parts in a SMES are motionless, which results in high reliability.

== Current use ==
There are several small SMES units available for commercial use and several larger test bed projects. Several 1 MW·h units are used for power quality control in installations around the world, especially to provide power quality at manufacturing plants requiring ultra-clean power, such as microchip fabrication facilities.

These facilities have also been used to provide grid stability in distribution systems. SMES is also used in utility applications. In northern Wisconsin, a string of distributed SMES units were deployed to enhance stability of a transmission loop. The transmission line is subject to large, sudden load changes due to the operation of a paper mill, with the potential for uncontrolled fluctuations and voltage collapse.

The Engineering Test Model is a large SMES with a capacity of approximately 20 MW·h, capable of providing 40 MW of power for 30 minutes or 10 MW of power for 2 hours.

== System architecture ==
A SMES system typically consists of four parts

Superconducting magnet and supporting structure

This system includes the superconducting coil, a magnet and the coil protection. Here the energy is stored by disconnecting the coil from the larger system and then using electromagnetic induction from the magnet to induce a current in the superconducting coil. This coil then preserves the current until the coil is reconnected to the larger system, after which the coil partly or fully discharges.

Refrigeration system

The refrigeration system maintains the superconducting state of the coil by cooling the coil to the operating temperature.

Power conditioning system

The power conditioning system typically contains a power conversion system that converts DC to AC current and the other way around.

Control system

The control system monitors the power demand of the grid and controls the power flow from and to the coil. The control system also manages the condition of the SMES coil by controlling the refrigerator.

== Working principle ==
As a consequence of Faraday's law of induction, any loop of wire that generates a changing magnetic field in time, also generates an electric field. This process takes energy out of the wire through the electromotive force (EMF). EMF is defined as electromagnetic work done on a unit charge when it has traveled one round of a conductive loop. The energy could now be seen as stored in the electric field. This process uses energy from the wire with power equal to the electric potential times the total charge divided by time. Where ℰ is the voltage or EMF. By defining the power we can calculate the work that is needed to create such an electric field. Due to energy conservation this amount of work also has to be equal to the energy stored in the field.

$$P=Q\mathcal E/t$$

This formula can be rewritten in the easier to measure variable of electric current by the substitution.

$$P=Q\mathcal E/t=I\mathcal E ,$$

where I is the electric current in Ampere. The EMF ℰ is an inductance and can thus be rewritten as:

$$\mathcal E = L \frac{dI}{dt}$$

Substitution now gives:

$$P=IL \frac{dI}{dt} ,$$

where L is just a linearity constant called the inductance measured in Henry. Now that the power is found, all that is left to do is fill in the work equation to find the work.

$$W = \int_{0}^{T}Pdt = \int_{0}^{I} IL\frac{dI}{dt}dt = \int_{0}^{I} ILdI = \frac{LI^2}{2}$$

As said earlier the work has to be equal to the energy stored in the field. This entire calculation is based on a single looped wire. For wires that are looped multiple times the inductance L increases, as L is simply defined as the ratio between the voltage and rate of change of the current. In conclusion the stored energy in the coil is equal to:

$$E = \frac{LI^2}{2}$$

where

- E = energy measured in joules
- L = inductance measured in henries
- I = current measured in amperes

Consider a cylindrical coil with conductors of a rectangular cross section. The mean radius of coil is R. a and b are width and depth of the conductor. f is called form function, which is different for different shapes of coil. ξ (xi) and δ (delta) are two parameters to characterize the dimensions of the coil. We can therefore write the magnetic energy stored in such a cylindrical coil as shown below. This energy is a function of coil dimensions, number of turns and carrying current.

$$E = RN^2I^2f(\xi,\delta)/ 2$$

where

- E = energy measured in joules
- I = current measured in amperes
- f(ξ, δ) = form function, joules per ampere-meter
- N = number of turns of coil

== Solenoid versus toroid ==
Besides the properties of the wire, the configuration of the coil itself is an important issue from a mechanical engineering aspect. There are three factors that affect the design and the shape of the coil – they are: Inferior strain tolerance, thermal contraction upon cooling and Lorentz forces in an energized coil. Among them, the strain tolerance is crucial not because of any electrical effect, but because it determines how much structural material is needed to keep the SMES from breaking. For small SMES systems, the optimistic value of 0.3% strain tolerance is selected. Toroidal geometry can help to lessen the external magnetic forces and therefore reduces the size of mechanical support needed. Also, due to the low external magnetic field, toroidal SMES can be located near a utility or customer load.

For small SMES, solenoids are usually used because they are easy to coil and no pre-compression is needed. In toroidal SMES, the coil is always under compression by the outer hoops and two disks, one of which is on the top and the other is on the bottom to avoid breakage. Currently, there is little need for toroidal geometry for small SMES, but as the size increases, mechanical forces become more important and the toroidal coil is needed.

The older large SMES concepts usually featured a low aspect ratio solenoid approximately 100 m in diameter buried in earth. At the low extreme of size is the concept of micro-SMES solenoids, for energy storage range near 1 MJ.

== Low-temperature versus high-temperature superconductors ==
Under steady state conditions and in the superconducting state, the coil resistance is negligible. However, the refrigerator necessary to keep the superconductor cool requires electric power and this refrigeration energy must be considered when evaluating the efficiency of SMES as an energy storage device.

Although high-temperature superconductors (HTS) have higher critical temperature, flux lattice melting takes place in moderate magnetic fields around a temperature lower than this critical temperature. The heat loads that must be removed by the cooling system include conduction through the support system, radiation from warmer to colder surfaces, AC losses in the conductor (during charge and discharge), and losses from the cold–to-warm power leads that connect the cold coil to the power conditioning system. Conduction and radiation losses are minimized by proper design of thermal surfaces. Lead losses can be minimized by good design of the leads. AC losses depend on the design of the conductor, the duty cycle of the device and the power rating.

The refrigeration requirements for HTSC and low-temperature superconductor (LTSC) toroidal coils for the baseline temperatures of 77 K, 20 K, and 4.2 K, increases in that order. The refrigeration requirements here is defined as electrical power to operate the refrigeration system. As the stored energy increases by a factor of 100, refrigeration cost only goes up by a factor of 20. Also, the savings in refrigeration for an HTSC system is larger (by 60% to 70%) than for an LTSC systems.

== Cost ==
Whether HTSC or LTSC systems are more economical depends because there are other major components determining the cost of SMES: Conductor consisting of superconductor and copper stabilizer and cold support are major costs in themselves. They must be judged with the overall efficiency and cost of the device. Other components, such as vacuum vessel insulation, has been shown to be a small part compared to the large coil cost. The combined costs of conductors, structure and refrigerator for toroidal coils are dominated by the cost of the superconductor. The same trend is true for solenoid coils. HTSC coils cost more than LTSC coils by a factor of 2 to 4. HTSC was expected to be cheaper due to lower refrigeration requirements but this is not the case.

To gain some insight into costs consider a breakdown by major components of both HTSC and LTSC coils corresponding to three typical stored energy levels, 2, 20 and 200 MW·h. The conductor cost dominates the three costs for all HTSC cases and is particularly important at small sizes. The principal reason lies in the comparative current density of LTSC and HTSC materials. The critical current of HTSC wire is lower than LTSC wire generally in the operating magnetic field, about 5 to 10 teslas (T). Assume the wire costs are the same by weight. Because HTSC wire has lower (J_{c}) value than LTSC wire, it will take much more wire to create the same inductance. Therefore, the cost of wire is much higher than LTSC wire. Also, as the SMES size goes up from 2 to 20 to 200 MW·h, the LTSC conductor cost also goes up about a factor of 10 at each step. The HTSC conductor cost rises a little slower but is still by far the costliest item.

The structure costs of either HTSC or LTSC go up uniformly (a factor of 10) with each step from 2 to 20 to 200 MW·h. But HTSC structure cost is higher because the strain tolerance of the HTSC (ceramics cannot carry much tensile load) is less than LTSC, such as Nb_{3}Ti or Nb_{3}Sn, which demands more structure materials. Thus, in the very large cases, the HTSC cost can not be offset by simply reducing the coil size at a higher magnetic field.

It is worth noting here that the refrigerator cost in all cases is so small that there is very little percentage savings associated with reduced refrigeration demands at high temperature. This means that if a HTSC, BSCCO for instance, works better at a low temperature, say 20K, it will certainly be operated there. For very small SMES, the reduced refrigerator cost will have a more significant positive impact.

Clearly, the volume of superconducting coils increases with the stored energy. Also, we can see that the LTSC torus maximum diameter is always smaller for a HTSC magnet than LTSC due to higher magnetic field operation. In the case of solenoid coils, the height or length is also smaller for HTSC coils, but still much higher than in a toroidal geometry (due to low external magnetic field).

An increase in peak magnetic field yields a reduction in both volume (higher energy density) and cost (reduced conductor length). Smaller volume means higher energy density and cost is reduced due to the decrease of the conductor length. There is an optimum value of the peak magnetic field, about 7 T in this case. If the field is increased past the optimum, further volume reductions are possible with minimal increase in cost. The limit to which the field can be increased is usually not economic but physical and it relates to the impossibility of bringing the inner legs of the toroid any closer together and still leave room for the bucking cylinder.

The superconductor material is a key issue for SMES. Superconductor development efforts focus on increasing Jc and strain range and on reducing the wire manufacturing cost.

== Applications ==
The energy density, efficiency and the high discharge rate make SMES useful systems to incorporate into modern energy grids and green energy initiatives. The SMES system's uses can be categorized into three categories: power supply systems, control systems and emergency/contingency systems.

FACTS

FACTS (flexible AC transmission system) devices are static devices that can be installed in electricity grids. These devices are used to enhance the controllability and power transfer capability of an electric power grid. The application of SMES in FACTS devices was the first application of SMES systems. The first realization of SMES using FACTS devices were installed by the Bonneville power authority in 1980. This system uses SMES systems to damp the low frequencies, which contributes to the stabilization of the power grid. In 2000, SMES based FACTS systems were introduced at key points in the northern Winston power grid to enhance the stability of the grid.

Load leveling

The use of electric power requires a stable energy supply that delivers a constant power. This stability is dependent on the amount of power used and the amount of power created. The power usage varies throughout the day, and also varies during the seasons. SMES systems can be used to store energy when the generated power is higher than the demand/Load, and release power when the load is higher than the generated power. Thereby compensating for power fluctuations. Using these systems makes it possible for conventional generating units to operate at a constant output that is more efficient and convenient. However, when the power imbalance between supply and demand lasts for a long time, the SMES may get completely discharged.

Load frequency control

When the load does not meet the generated power output, due to a load perturbation, this can cause the load to be larger than the rated power output of the generators. This for example can happen when wind generators don't spin due to a sudden lack of wind. This load perturbation can cause a load-frequency control problem. This problem can be amplified in DFIG-based wind power generators. This load disparity can be compensated by power output from SMES systems that store energy when the generation is larger than the load. SMES based load frequency control systems have the advantage of a fast response when compared to contemporary control systems.

Uninterruptible power supplies

Uninterruptible Power Supplies (UPS) are used to protect against power surges and shortfalls by supplying a continuous power supply. This compensation is done by switching from the failing power supply to a SMES systems that can almost instantaneously supply the necessary power to continue the operation of essential systems. The SMES based UPS are most useful in systems that need to be kept at certain critical loads.

Circuit breaker reclosing

When the power angle difference across a circuit breaker is too large, protective relays prevent the reclosing of the circuit breakers. SMES systems can be used in these situations to reduce the power angle difference across the circuit breaker. Thereby allowing the reclosing of the circuit breaker. These systems allow the quick restoration of system power after major transmission line outages.

Spinning reserve

Spinning reserve is the extra generating capacity that is available by increasing the power generation of systems that are connected to the grid. This capacity reserved by the system operator for the compensation of disruptions in the power grid. Due to the fast recharge times and fast alternating current to direct current conversion process of SMES systems, these systems can be used as a spinning reserve when a major grid of transmission line is out of service.

SFCL

Superconducting fault current limiters (SFCL) are used to limit current under a fault in the grid. In this system a superconductor is quenched (raised in temperature) when a fault in the gridline is detected. By quenching the superconductor the resistance rises and the current is diverted to other grid lines. This is done without interrupting the larger grid. Once the fault is cleared, the SFCL temperature is lowered and becomes invisible to the larger grid.

Electromagnetic launchers

Electromagnetic launchers are electric projectile weapons that use a magnetic field to accelerate projectiles to a very high velocity. These launchers require high power pulse sources in order to work. These launchers can be realised by the use of the quick release capability and the high power density of the SMES system.

== Future developments for SMES systems ==
Future developments in the components of SMES systems could make them more viable for other applications; specifically, superconductors with higher critical temperatures and critical current densities. These limits are the same faced in other industrial usage of superconductors. Recent development of HTS wire made of YBCO with a superconducting transition temperature of around 90 K shows promise.Typically, the higher the superconducting transition temperature, the higher the maximum current density the superconductor can sustain before Cooper pair breakdown. A substance with a high critical temperature will generally have a higher critical current at low temperature than a superconductor with a lower critical temperature. This higher critical current will raise the energy storage quadratically, which may make SMES and other industrial applications of superconductors cost-effective.

== Technical challenges ==
The energy content of current SMES systems is usually quite small. Methods to increase the energy stored in SMES often resort to large-scale storage units. As with other superconducting applications, cryogenics are a necessity. A robust mechanical structure is usually required to contain the very large Lorentz forces generated by and on the magnet coils. The dominant cost for SMES is the superconductor, followed by the cooling system and the rest of the mechanical structure.

Mechanical support

Needed because of large Lorentz forces generated by the strong magnetic field acting on the coil, and the strong magnetic field generated by the coil on the larger structure.

Size

To achieve commercially useful levels of storage, around 5 GW·h (18 TJ), a SMES installation would need a loop of around 800 m. This is traditionally pictured as a circle, though in practice it could be more like a rounded rectangle. In either case it would require access to a significant amount of land to house the installation.

Manufacturing

here are two manufacturing issues around SMES. The first is the fabrication of bulk cable suitable to carry the current. The HTSC superconducting materials found to date are relatively delicate ceramics, making it difficult to use established techniques to draw extended lengths of superconducting wire. Much research has focused on layer deposit techniques, applying a thin film of material onto a stable substrate, but this is currently only suitable for small-scale electrical circuits.

Infrastructure

The second problem is the infrastructure required for an installation. Until room-temperature superconductors are found, the 800 m loop of wire would have to be contained within a vacuum flask of liquid nitrogen. This in turn would require stable support, most commonly envisioned by burying the installation.

Critical magnetic field

Above a certain field strength, known as the critical field, the superconducting state is destroyed. This means that there exists a maximum charging rate for the superconducting material, given that the magnitude of the magnetic field determines the flux captured by the superconducting coil.

Critical current

In general power systems look to maximize the current they are able to handle. This makes any losses due to inefficiencies in the system relatively insignificant. Unfortunately, large currents may generate magnetic fields greater than the critical field due to Ampere's Law. Current materials struggle, therefore, to carry sufficient current to make a commercial storage facility economically viable.

Several issues at the onset of the technology have hindered its proliferation:

1. Expensive refrigeration units and high power cost to maintain operating temperatures
2. Existence and continued development of adequate technologies using normal conductors

These still pose problems for superconducting applications but are improving over time. Advances have been made in the performance of superconducting materials. Furthermore, the reliability and efficiency of refrigeration systems has improved significantly.

Long precooling time

At the moment it takes four months to cool the coil from room temperature to its operating temperature. This also means that the SMES takes equally long to return to operating temperature after maintenance and when restarting after operating failures.

Protection

Due to the large amount of energy stored, certain measures need to be taken to protect the coils from damage in the case of coil failure. The rapid release of energy in case of coil failure might damage surrounding systems. Some conceptual designs propose to incorporate a superconducting cable into the design with as goal the absorption of energy after coil failure. The system also needs to be kept in excellent electric isolation in order to prevent loss of energy.

== See also ==
- Grid energy storage

== Bibliography ==
- Sheahen, T., P. (1994). Introduction to High-Temperature Superconductivity. Plenum Press, New York. pp. 66, 76–78, 425–430, 433–446.
- El-Wakil, M., M. (1984). Powerplant Technology. McGraw-Hill, pp. 685–689, 691–695.
- Wolsky, A., M. (2002). The status and prospects for flywheels and SMES that incorporate HTS. Physica C 372–376, pp. 1,495–1,499.
- Hassenzahl, W.V. (March 2001). "Superconductivity, an enabling technology for 21st century power systems?". IEEE Transactions on Applied Superconductivity. 11 (1): 1447–1453. Bibcode:2001ITAS...11.1447H. doi:10.1109/77.920045.
